= Out My Mind, Just in Time World Tour =

2010 concert tour by Erykah Badu

Out My Mind, Just in Time Tour
- Tour by Erykah Badu
- Associated album: New Amerykah Part Two (Return of the Ankh)
- Start date: May 28, 2010
- End date: December 3, 2010
- Legs: 5
- No. of shows: 30 in North America; 10 in Europe; 1 in South America; 41 total

Erykah Badu concert chronology
- Jam Tour (2009); Out My Mind, Just in Time World Tour (2010); Live from Badubotron Tour (2021–22)

The Out My Mind, Just in Time Tour was a concert tour by American R&B/soul singer, Erykah Badu, in support of her album, New Amerykah Part Two (Return of the Ankh). Before the initial kick off of the tour in May, Badu performed concerts in the following cities, on February 19, in Oakland, March 30, Los Angeles and April 8, 2010, in Miami at the Waterfront Theatre.

== Opening acts ==
- Bilal (USA—Leg 1-select venues)
- Janelle Monáe (USA—Leg 1-select venues)
- N.E.R.D. (USA—Leg 1-select venues)
- Questlove (USA—select venues)
- Lupe Fiasco (USA—Leg 1-select venues)
- B.o.B (USA—Leg 1-select venues)

== Set list ==
Badu's set list changed on various dates, however these are songs she performed on the tour:

- "Jump Up in the Air and Stay There" (video intro)
- "Amerykahn Promise" (band intro)
- "20 Feet Tall
- "Out My Mind, Just in Time"
- "The Healer"
- "Me"
- "No Love"
- "Certainly"
- "Umm Hmm"
- "On & On"/"... & On"
- "Appletree"
- "I Want You"
- "Fall in Love"
- "You Loving Me" (Extended)
- "Annie Don't Wear No Pannies" ^{1}
- "Soldier" ^{1}
- "Nuclear War"
- "Didn't Cha Know?"
- "Love of My Life (An Ode to Hip-Hop)"
- "Next Lifetime"^{1}
- "Otherside of the Game"
- "Danger"
- "Liberation"/ "That Hump" ^{1}
- "Window Seat"
- "Tyrone" ^{1}
- "Turn Me Away (Get MuNNY)"
- "Penitentiary Philosophy" ^{1}
- "Gone Baby, Don't Be Long"
- "Back in the Day (Puff)" ^{1}
- "Bag Lady" ^{1}
- "My People" (Outro)

^{(1)} performed on select dates in North America and Europe

== Band ==
- Director/Keyboards: R.C. Williams
- Percussions: Escobedo
- Drums: TaRon Lockett
- Guitar: Ella Rae Feingold
- Flute: Dwayne Kerr
- Bass: Webbe
- Turntables: Rashad Smith
- Background vocals: Rachel Yahvah, Koryan "Nayrok" Wright, RaRe Valverde

== Tour dates ==
Date	City	Country	Venue
North America
May 28, 2010	Washington, D.C.	United States	DAR Constitution Hall
May 29, 2010	Washington, D.C.	United States	DAR Constitution Hall
May 30, 2010	Baltimore	United States	Pier Six Concert Pavilion
June 2, 2010	Chicago	United States	Chicago Theatre
June 3, 2010	Chicago	United States	Chicago Theatre
June 6, 2010	Boston	United States	Orpheum Theatre
June 7, 2010	New York City	United States	Roseland Ballroom
June 8, 2010	Upper Darby Township	United States	Tower Theater
June 10, 2010	Memphis	United States	Orpheum Theatre
June 13, 2010	Houston	United States	Verizon Wireless Theater
June 14, 2010	Grand Prairie	United States	Nokia Theatre at Grand Prairie
June 16, 2010	Denver	United States	Fillmore Auditorium
June 18, 2010	Oakland	United States	Paramount Theatre
June 19, 2010	Saratoga	United States	Mountain Winery
June 20, 2010	Los Angeles	United States	Greek Theatre
June 22, 2010	San Diego	United States	Humphrey's Bay
June 23, 2010	Tempe	United States	Marquee Theatre
June 24, 2010	Las Vegas	United States	Pearl Concert Theater
July 2, 2010	Portland	United States	Sleep Amphitheatre
July 3, 2010	George	United States	The Gorge Amphitheatre
Europe
July 9, 2010	Hultsfred	Sweden	Hultsfred Festival
July 10, 2010	Liège	Belgium	Les Ardentes Festival
July 11, 2010	Montreux	Switzerland	Montreux Jazz Festival
July 13, 2010	Amsterdam	Netherlands	Heineken Music Hall
July 15, 2010	Monte Carlo	Monaco	Monaco Sporting Club
July 17, 2010	Madrid	Spain	Escenario Puerta Del Angel
July 18, 2010	Barcelona	Spain	Poble Espanyol
July 20, 2010	Rome	Italy	Auditorium Cavea
July 22, 2010	Paris	France	Olympia
July 24, 2010	London	England	O2 Academy Brixton
North America
August 4, 2010	Norfolk	United States	Chrysler Hall
August 6, 2010	Richmond	United States	Kanawah Plaza
August 7, 2010	Columbia	United States	Merriweather Post Pavilion
August 8, 2010	Chicago	United States	Hutchinson Field
August 11, 2010	Toronto	Canada	Kool Haus (cancelled)
August 12, 2010	Detroit	United States	Chene Park
August 14, 2010	Atlanta	United States	Chastain Park Amphitheater
August 15, 2010	Orlando	United States	House of Blues
South America
August 29, 2010	São Paulo	Brazil	Credicard Hall
North America
October 16, 2010	San Bernardino	United States	Smokeout Festival
December 3, 2010	Chicago	United States	UIC Pavilion
