= Jam Tour =

2009 concert tour by Erykah Badu

- Tour by Erykah Badu
- Associated album: New Amerykah Part One
- Start date: May 24, 2009
- End date: October 16, 2009
- Legs: 3
- No. of shows: 22 in North America; 10 in Europe; 32 in total

Erykah Badu concert chronology
- The Vortex World Tour (2008); Jam Tour (2009); Out My Mind, Just in Time World Tour (2010)

The Jam Tour was a summer and fall concert tour in 2009 by American R&B singer Erykah Badu. The tour started on May 24 in Los Angeles, Badu played dates across North America twice and Europe, which ended in Dallas, Texas on October 16. During the North America second leg, Badu was featured as a special guest co-headliner on hip-hop artist Mos Def's Ecstatic Tour on select September dates.

Prior to the start of tour, Badu performed two shows in April at the New Orleans Jazz Festival. Her fifth studio album, New Amerykah Part Two (Return of the Ankh) was released the following year in March 2010.

== Opening act ==
- Jay Electronica (USA—Leg 2)

== Set list ==
1. "A Milli" (intro interlude)
2. "Amerykahn Promise"
3. "The Healer"
4. "Me"
5. "My People"
6. "Soldier" ^{1}
7. "On & On" / "...& On"
8. "Orange Moon" ^{1}
9. "Didn't Cha Know?"
10. "That Hump" ^{1}
11. "Back in the Day (Puff)" (contains elements of "Juicy Fruit")
12. "Appletree"
13. Michael Jackson Tribute: "Off the Wall"
14. "I Want You"
15. "Love of My Life (An Ode to Hip-Hop)" (contains elements of "Rapper's Delight" and "Gangsta Gangsta")
16. "Love of My Life Worldwide"
17. "Black Ghost" (reprise)
18. "Otherside of the Game"
19. "The Healer" (reprise)
20. "A Milli" (outro interlude)

^{1} performed on select dates in Europe and the U.S.

Notes

- The song "A Milli" by hip-hop rapper Lil Wayne was featured as opening and closing instrumental for Badu's set list for the tour.

== Tour dates ==
Date	City	Country	Venue
North America
April 24, 2009	New Orleans	United States	New Orleans Jazz Festival
April 25, 2009	New Orleans	United States	New Orleans Jazz Festival
May 24, 2009	Los Angeles	United States	Jazz Reggae Festival
May 25, 2009	George	United States	The Gorge Amphitheatre
May 29, 2009	Honolulu	United States	Aloha Tower
May 30, 2009	Phoenix	United States	Celebrity Theatre
May 31, 2009	Las Vegas	United States	House of Blues
June 2, 2009	Anaheim	United States	The Grove of Anaheim
June 4, 2009	San Diego	United States	Humphrey's Concerts by the Bay
June 5, 2009	Los Angeles	United States	Club Nokia
June 6, 2009	San Francisco	United States	The Warfield
June 12, 2009	Manchester	United States	Bonnaroo Music Festival
June 14, 2009	Manchester	United States	Bonnaroo Music Festival
Europe
July 1, 2009	Dublin	Ireland	Vicar Music Festival
July 8, 2009	Milan	Italy	Arena Civica
July 10, 2009	Paris	France	Zénith de Paris
July 11, 2009	Rotterdam	Netherlands	Rotterdam Ahoy
July 13, 2009	Copenhagen	Denmark	The Vega
July 15, 2009	Oslo	Norway	Sentrum Scene
July 16, 2009	Milan	Italy	Milano Jazzin' Festival
July 17, 2009	Pori	Finland	Pori Jazz Festival
July 19, 2009	Stockholm	Sweden	Stockholm Jazz Festival
July 21, 2009	Nice	France	Nice Jazz Festival
North America
August 4, 2009	New York City	United States	Governors Island
August 6, 2009	Atlantic City	United States	House of Blues
August 7, 2009	Detroit	United States	Chene Park Amphitheatre
August 8, 2009	Columbia	United States	Summer Spirit Festival
August 29, 2009	Raleigh	United States	Soul Music Festival
September 3, 2009	San Francisco	United States	Louise M. Davies Symphony Hall
September 4, 2009	Oakland	United States	Paramount Theatre
September 5, 2009	Los Angeles	United States	Hollywood Palladium
September 10, 2009	Memphis	United States	Orpheum Theater
September 17, 2009	Philadelphia	United States	Electric Factory
October 16, 2009	Dallas	United States	Red Bull Soundclash

Note

- Not all of the U.S. dates may be listed.
