= The Vortex World Tour =

2008 concert tour by Erykah Badu

The Vortex Tour
- Tour by Erykah Badu
- Associated album: New Amerykah Part One (4th World War)
- Start date: May 4, 2008
- End date: October 24, 2008
- Legs: 3
- No. of shows: 34 in North America; 19 in Europe; 53 in total

Erykah Badu concert chronology
- Summer Tour (2006); The Vortex World Tour (2008); Jam Tour (2009)

The Vortex Tour was a worldwide tour by American R&B/soul singer Erykah Badu in support of her platinum selling 2008 album, New Amerykah Part One (4th World War). The U.S. tour kicked off May 4, in Detroit, ending on June 15, in Albuquerque, New Mexico. The second leg of tour reached Europe on June 25, in Copenhagen, Denmark. Badu toured across Europe playing shows that included an itinerary for the month of July. Several more shows were added throughout August in the U.S.

== Opening act ==
- The Roots (USA—Leg 1)

== Setlist ==
1. "My People/Intro" (instrumental)
2. "Amerykahn Promise"
3. "The Healer"
4. "Me"
5. "My People"
6. "Twinkle"
7. "The Cell"^{1}
8. "Back in the Day" (contains elements of "Juicy Fruit)"
9. "On & On"/"...& On"
10. "Didn't Cha Know?"
11. "Soldier"
12. "Master Teacher"
13. "Appletree" (Remix)
14. "I Want You" (contains elements of "Love to Love You Baby")
15. "Next Lifetime"^{1}
16. "Annie" ^{1}
17. "Other Side of the Game"
18. "Danger"
19. "Time's a Wastin'"
20. "Orange Moon"
21. Medley: "Liberation"/ "Green Eyes"^{1}
22. "Love of My Life (An Ode to Hip-Hop)"
23. "Telephone"^{2}
24. "Tyrone"
25. "Honey"^{1}
26. "Bag Lady"

^{1} performed on select dates in North America and Europe
^{2} performed on select dates in North America.

Additional notes

- On select dates, as Badu performed "Other Side of the Game", members of The Roots would strut and dance across the stage as she adlib, "can't understand the game".
- During select dates in Europe, "The Cell" was performed followed by "Twinkle", Badu sang the chorus of Common's "The Light" after "Bag Lady".

== Band ==
- Director/Keyboards: R.C. Williams
- Guitar: Michael Feingold
- Percussions: James Clemons
- Bass: Stepen Bruner
- Drums: Lamont Taylor
- Flute: Dwayne Kerr
- Turntables: Rashad Smith
- Background vocals: Keisha Jackson, Koryan "Nayrok" Wright, Rachel Yahvah

== Tour dates ==
Date	City	Country	Venue
North America
May 4, 2008	Detroit	United States	Fox Theatre
May 5, 2008	Toronto	Canada	Massey Hall
May 6, 2008	Sherbrooke	Canada	Jacques Cartier Park
May 8, 2008	Boston	United States	Orpheum Theatre
May 9, 2008	New York City	United States	Radio City Music Hall
May 10, 2008	Baltimore	United States	Pier Six Pavilion
May 11, 2008	Upper Darby Township	United States	Tower Theater
May 14, 2008	Washington, D.C.	United States	DAR Constitution Hall
May 15, 2008	Washington, D.C.	United States	DAR Constitution Hall
May 16, 2008	Norfolk	United States	Chrysler Hall
May 17, 2008	Greensboro	United States	Greensboro Coliseum
May 18, 2008	Richmond	United States	Landmark Theater
May 20, 2008	Boca Raton	United States	Mizner Park Amphitheater
May 21, 2008	San Juan	Puerto Rico	Coliseum of Puerto Rico
May 23, 2008	Atlanta	United States	Fox Theatre
May 24, 2008	Montgomery	United States	Jubilee Festival
May 25, 2008	Oranjestad	Aruba	Soul Beach Music Festival
May 27, 2008	Nashville	United States	Tennessee Performing Arts Center
May 28, 2008	Memphis	United States	Orpheum Theatre
May 29, 2008	St. Louis	United States	Fox Theatre
May 30, 2008	Chicago	United States	Chicago Theatre
May 31, 2008	Chicago	United States	Chicago Theatre
June 2, 2008	Denver	United States	Fillmore Auditorium
June 3, 2008	Salt Lake City	United States	The Depot
June 5, 2008	Redmond	United States	Marymoore Amphitheater
June 6, 2008	Vancouver	Canada	Commodore Ballroom
June 8, 2008	Oakland	United States	Paramount Theatre
June 10, 2008	San Diego	United States	Humphrey's Bay
June 12, 2008	Los Angeles	United States	Greek Theater
June 13, 2008	Las Vegas	United States	House of Blues
June 14, 2008	Mesa	United States	Mesa Amphitheatre
June 15, 2008	Albuquerque	United States	Kiva Auditorium
Europe
June 25, 2008	Copenhagen	Denmark	Falconer Salen
June 26, 2008	Stockholm	Sweden	Berns Salonger
June 27, 2008	Brussels	Belgium	Couleur Café
June 28, 2008	Paris	France	Palais des congrès de Paris
June 30, 2008	London	England	Brixton Academy
July 1, 2008	Dublin	Ireland	Vicar Street
July 4, 2008	Montreux	Switzerland	Montreux Jazz Festival
July 5, 2008	Gdynia	Poland	Heineken Opener Festival
July 6, 2008	Rome	Italy	Parco della Musica
July 8, 2008	Lucca	Italy	Piazza Napoleone
July 11, 2008	Madrid	Spain	Cuartel del Conde-Duque
July 12, 2008	Málaga	Spain	Teatro Cervantes de Almería
July 14, 2008	Barcelona	Spain	Poble Espanyol
July 17, 2008	Ghent	Belgium	Blue Note Festival
July 18, 2008	Lucerne	Switzerland	Blue Balls Festival
July 19, 2008	Stuttgart	Germany	Jazz Open Festival
July 22, 2008	Amsterdam	Netherlands	Paradiso
July 23, 2008	Amsterdam	Netherlands	Paradiso
July 26, 2008	Wiesen	Austria	Nova Jazz & Blue Nights
North America
September 27, 2008	Austin	United States	Austin City Limits Music Festival
October 24, 2008	New Orleans	United States	Voodoo Music Festival
