= New Amerykah =

New Amerykah may refer to two albums by US soul singer Erykah Badu:

- New Amerykah Part One (4th World War) (2008)
- New Amerykah Part Two (Return of the Ankh) (2010)
