= Georgia Anne Muldrow =

American musician (born 1983)

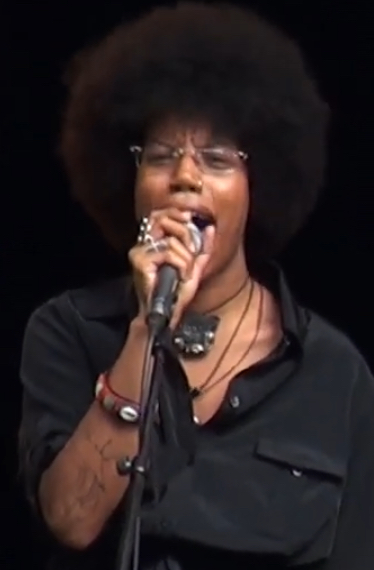
- Muldrow performing in 2012

Background information
- Also known as: Ms. One; Jyoti; Hephzibah
- Born: September 30, 1983 (age 43); Los Angeles, California, US
- Genres: Neo-soul; hip-hop; R&B
- Occupations: Singer; rapper; songwriter; producer
- Years active: 2005–present
- Labels: SomeOthaShip Connect; Stones Throw; Ramp Recordings; Epistophik Peach Sound; Mello Music Group; Animated Cartunes; Brainfeeder

Georgia Anne Muldrow (born 1983) is an American soul and hip-hop singer, producer, and songwriter from Los Angeles. In 2008, she co-founded the SomeOthaShip Connect record label with fellow artist and former husband Dudley Perkins.

== Life and career ==
Muldrow grew up in a musical environment of her session musician parents, jazz guitarist Ronald Muldrow and singer Rickie Byars.

In 2006, Muldrow released the debut EP, Worthnothings, on Stones Throw Records. Her first album, Olesi: Fragments of an Earth, was released on the label in that year. In 2012, she released Seeds, an album entirely produced by Madlib, on SomeOthaShip Connect. In 2018, she released Overload on Brainfeeder.

== Style and influences ==
In a New York Times article in 2009, rapper Mos Def compared Muldrow's music to Roberta Flack, Nina Simone, and Ella Fitzgerald. AllMusic described her as "one of the most daring and important (albeit underappreciated) artists of her time".

== Discography ==
=== Studio albums ===
- Olesi: Fragments of an Earth (2006)
- Sagala (2007) (as Pattie Blingh and the Akebulan Five)
- The Message Uni Versa (2007) (with Dudley Perkins)
- Umsindo (2009)
- Early (2009)
- SomeOthaShip (2010) (with Dudley Perkins)
- Ocotea (2010) (as Jyoti)
- Kings Ballad (2010)
- Vweto (2011)
- Owed to Mama Rickie (2011)
- The Blackhouse (2012) (with DJ Romes, as The Blackhouse)
- Seeds (2012)
- Denderah (2013) (as Jyoti)
- The Lighthouse (2013) (with Dudley Perkins)
- Oligarchy Sucks! (2014)
- A Thoughtiverse Unmarred (2015)
- Overload (2018)
- Vweto II (2019)
- Black Love and War (2019) (with Dudley Perkins)
- Mama, You Can Bet! (2020) (as Jyoti)
- Vweto III (2021)
- Zhigeist (2022) (with Elzhi)

=== Mixtapes ===
- Beautiful Mindz (2008) (with Dudley Perkins)

=== EPs ===
- Worthnothings (2006)
- Heaven or Hell (2010) (with Dudley Perkins)
- Ms. One (2014)

=== Singles ===
- "A Requiem for Leroy" (2006)
- "Seeds" (2012)
- "Tell Em (Remix)" (2012) (with Riff Raff McGriff)
- "Popstopper" (2013) (with Dudley Perkins)
- "Akosua" (2013)

=== Guest appearances ===
- Platinum Pied Pipers - "Your Day Is Done," "Lights Out," "One Minute More," and "Flowers For Zoe" from Triple P (2005)
- Eric Lau - "Yet & Still" from Eric Lau Presents Dudley and Friends (2006)
- Oh No - "T. Biggums" from Exodus into Unheard Rhythms (2006)
- Sa-Ra Creative Partners - "Fly Away" from The Hollywood Recordings (2007)
- Erykah Badu - "Master Teacher" from New Amerykah Part One (2008)
- Madlib - "The Plan Pt. 1" from WLIB AM: King of the Wigflip (2008)
- Mos Def - "Roses" from The Ecstatic (2009)
- Electric Wire Hustle - "This World" from Electric Wire Hustle (2009)
- Erykah Badu - "Out My Mind, Just In Time" from New Amerykah Part Two (2010)
- Robert Glasper - "The Consequences of Jealousy (Georgia Anne Muldrow's Sassy Geemix)" from Black Radio Recovered: The Remix EP (2012)
- Oh No - "Improvement" from Disrupted Ads (2013)
- The Black Opera - "Beginning of the End" from The Great Year (2014)
- Akua Naru - "Mr. Brownskin" from The Miner's Canary (2015)
- Declaime - "The Message 2014," "Concentration," and "Flys Eye" from Southside Story (2015)
- J-Zen - "God Music" from Managua (2015)
- Duckwrth - "GET UUGLY" from I'M UGLY (2016)
- Miles Davis and Robert Glasper - "Milestones" from Everything's Beautiful (2016)
- Nosizwe - "The Best Drug" from In Fragments (2016)
- Them That Do - "Trying to Say" from Them That Do (2016)
- Keyon Harrold - "Wayfaring Traveler" from The Mugician (2017)
- Noah Slee - "Dawn (Interlude)" from Otherland (2017)
- Eun - "Fox" from Darkness Must Be Beautiful (2018)
- Blood Orange - "Runnin'" from Negro Swan (2018)
- Clever Austin - "You Are All You Need" from Pareidolia (2019)
- Joe Armon-Jones - "Yellow Dandelion" from Turn To Clear View (2019)
- Kidd Mojo - "Pearls" from Dionysia (2020)
- Salami Rose Joe Louis - "Pecular Machine (Georgia Anne Muldrow Remix)" from Chapters of Zdenka (2020)
- Sons Of The James - "Things I Should Have Said" from Everlasting (2020)
- Seba Kaapstad - "Free" from Konke (2020)
- Denzel Curry and Kenny Beats - "Track07 (Georgia Anne Muldrow Version)" (with Arlo Parks) from Unlocked 1.5 (2021)
- Brittany Howard - "History Repeats (Geemix)" from Jaime (Reimagined) (2021)
- Little Dragon - "Hold On (Georgia Anne Muldrow Remix)" from New Me, Same Us Remix EP (2021)
- Pink Siifu - "Scurrrd" from GUMBO'! (2021)
- Hiatus Kaiyote - "Get Sun (Georgia Anne Muldrow Remix)" from Mood Variant (The Remixes) (2022)
- Sons Of The James - "Things I Should Have Said (Emmavie Remix)" (2022)
- Baby Rose - "Fight Club" from Through and Through (2023)
- Danielle Ponder - "Some Of Us Are Brave (Georgia Anne Muldrow's Geemix)" from Some Of Us Are Brave (Deluxe) (2023)
- Blu & Exile - "Hello L.A." from Love (the) Ominous World (2024)
- Julius Rodriguez - "Champion's Call" from Evergreen (2024)
- Kronos Quartet - "Outer Spaceways Incorporated" from Outer Spaceways Incorporated (2024)
- Mach-Hommy - "Sonje" from #Richaxxhaitian (2024)
- Nubya Garcia - "We Walk In Gold" from Odyssey (2024)
- Talib Kweli & J. Rawls - "Love For Life" from The Confidence of Knowing (2024)
- Your Old Droog & Flying Lotus - "I Don't Care" from Bread & Butter (2026)
- Otis Mensah - "prayerhands and headnods" from Come Beautify The Night (2026)
