= New Amerykah Part One (4th World War) =

Studio album by Erykah Badu
- Released: February 26, 2008
- Studios: Luminous Sound Recording (Dallas); Cosmic Dust (Los Angeles); Electric Lady (New York)
- Genres: R&B; neo soul; funk; psychedelic soul
- Length: 58:52
- Labels: Control Freaq; Universal Motown
- Producers: Roy Ayers; Erykah Badu; Mike "Chav" Chavarria; Edwin Birdsong; William Allen; Madlib; Sa-Ra; Karriem Riggins; Taz Arnold; Georgia Anne Muldrow; Om'Mas Keith; James Poyser; Ahmir "Questlove" Thompson; 9th Wonder

Erykah Badu chronology
Worldwide Underground (2003)	New Amerykah Part One (4th World War) (2008)	New Amerykah Part Two (Return of the Ankh) (2010)

Singles from New Amerykah Part One (4th World War)
- 1. "Honey" Released: December 11, 2007; 2. "Soldier" Released: April 23, 2008

New Amerykah Part One (4th World War) is the fourth studio album by American R&B singer Erykah Badu. It was released on February 26, 2008, by her own label Control Freaq Records and Universal Motown Records following Badu's hiatus from recording music due to writer's block. In returning from the hiatus, she received music from several hip hop producers over the Internet and recorded demos of her vocals using the GarageBand software on her laptop. Most of the album was then recorded at Electric Lady Studios in New York City.

New Amerykah Part One is an esoteric concept album titled as a pun on Badu's first name and a reflection of the record's political leanings. It features social commentary and themes related to the plight of the African-American community, including poverty, urban violence, complacency, and cultural identity. The record's densely produced music incorporates hip hop, soul, funk, jazz, and electronica styles.

The album debuted at number two on the Billboard 200 chart, eventually selling 359,000 copies in the United States by December 2009. Two singles were released in support of the album—"Honey" and "Soldier"—and Badu performed its music on her Vortex World Tour. Critically, New Amerykah Part One was a widespread success, being named by many critics as one of 2008's best records. In 2019, it was voted the 92nd best album of the 21st century in a poll of music journalists published by The Guardian.

== Background ==
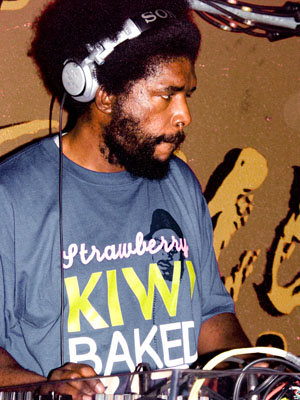
Producer and drummer Questlove (pictured in 2006) sent music to Badu during her hiatus.

Dealing with writer's block and conflicted about her mainstream success, Erykah Badu embarked on her Frustrated Artist Tour in 2003. Her increasing popularity brought upon some backlash towards her public image and expectations of her as "queen of neo soul", an honorific nickname that she found limiting. Her third studio album, Worldwide Underground (2003), was released to mostly positive reviews and was certified gold, although it was underpromoted and sold less than her previous albums. Badu herself was not satisfied with the album and felt she had nothing substantial to express with her music at the time. She took time off from her recording career to deal with her creative block and focus on caring for her children, although she continued to tour in the period between albums.

In 2004, Badu gave birth to a daughter, Puma Rose, with her former boyfriend, rapper The D.O.C. Later that year, she received her first computer as a Christmas gift from drummer and producer Ahmir "Questlove" Thompson, and began communicating with and receiving music from him and other producers such as Q-Tip and J Dilla. Beginning in 2005, Badu worked from her home in Dallas and used the software application GarageBand as a digital audio workstation, which she was introduced to by her son, Seven. He taught her how to use her laptop as a mini recording studio, and she used it to construct various backing tracks for songs. Using GarageBand, she recorded demos of her vocals by singing into the computer's microphone.

Badu composed more than 75 songs within the year and intended on splitting them among her planned series of New Amerykah albums. She said of her productivity with her laptop, "I could be here, in my own space, with headphones on, and the kids could be doing what they doing, and I’m cooking dinner still, I’m making juices still, and it’s so easy just to sing. You got an idea — boom! Idea, boom!" Badu's iChat contacts, including hip hop producers Questlove, Madlib, 9th Wonder, and J Dilla, instant messaged her to get back into the studio and sent her tracks. Such exchanges inspired a creative spark for Badu, who explained in an interview for the Dallas Observer, "I started to accept that maybe it's OK for me to put out music, and it doesn't have to be something dynamic or world-changing. But just as I was accepting that, here comes this burst of light and energy and creativity. And that's the process, I guess, of life—the detachment and the release of something gives you even more room to grow or be creative."

With the album, Badu sought to augment her music's production, expose the work of underground hip hop producers, and exceed listeners' expectations of contemporary music. She explained to Billboard that "in taking on a project like this, I'm taking the responsibility to talk for my race and my planet." In an interview for the New York Post, she explained the album to be about "the war against self ... against your inner being", and said of her hiatus, "I've always taken my time between albums. I'm a performing artist - recording is secondary to me. My performances are what drive me. It's like my therapy. I like to write a lot while I'm on the road before I even think about recording." Badu also said that she now had a relevant message to express for listeners and was no longer struggling with a creative block.

== Recording ==
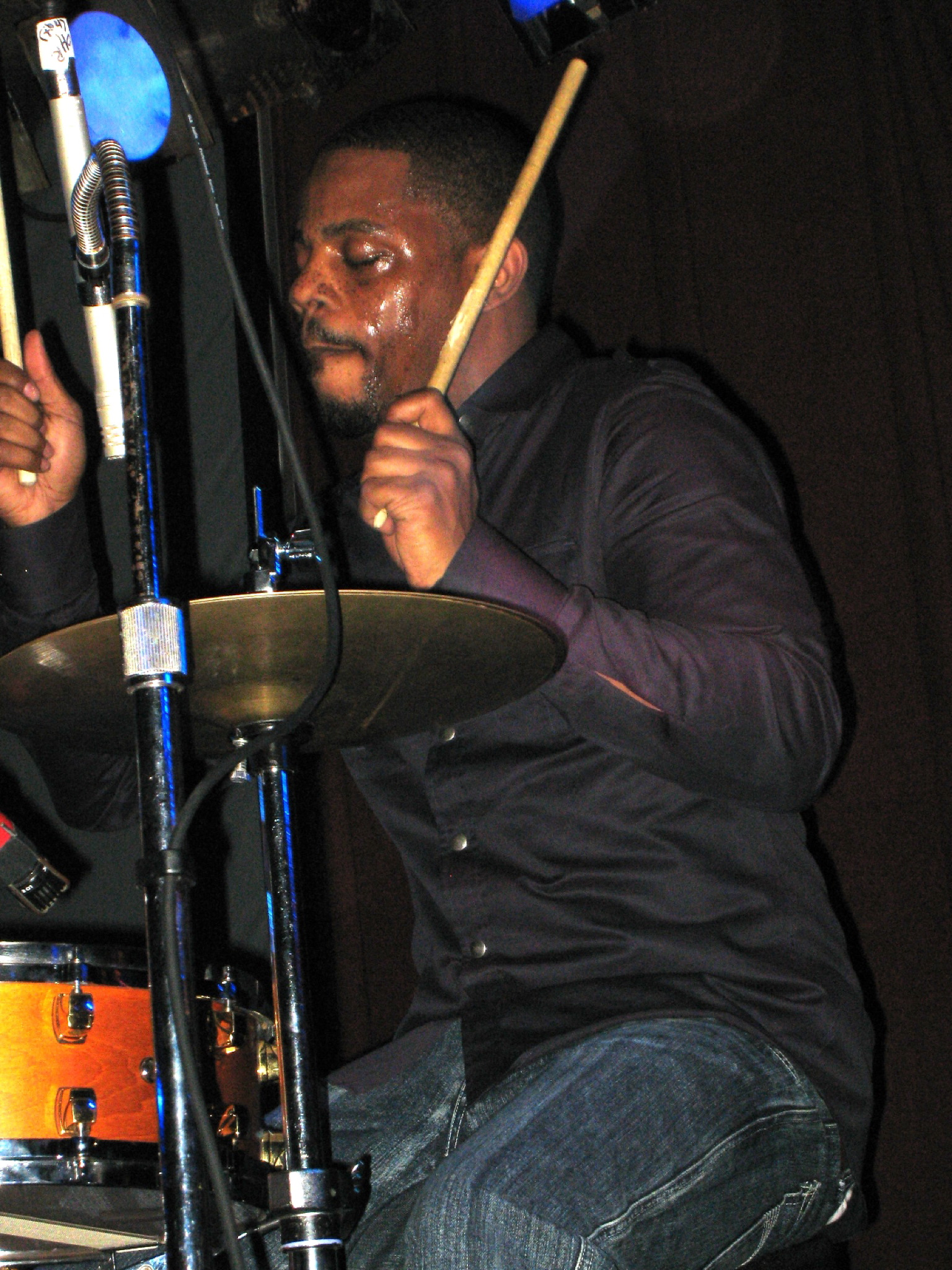
Karriem Riggins (2005)

For New Amerykah Part One, Badu collaborated principally with Questlove, Madlib, 9th Wonder, Karriem Riggins, James Poyser, audio engineer Mike "Chav" Chavarria, and the members of musical group Sa-Ra, who made production and lyrical contributions to most of the tracks. She later explained choosing which producers to work with, saying "All of these people have a reputation for being visionaries and knowing them well, I felt 'Okay, now it's time to put together a project that not only takes us to another place, another dimension, but highlights these sights.' And that's what I had in mind for this project".

Badu began recording New Amerykah Part One at Luminous Sound Recording in Dallas, where she was assisted by Chavarria in recording vocals and basic tracks to 2-tracks. Her vocal harmonies were recorded to a Studer A820 ½-inch, an Analog Playback Tape machine, using RMG magnetic tape. Poyser, who was heavily involved as musician and producer in all of Badu's previous work, had his role on the album reduced amicably to accommodate her minimalist, beat-driven approach in production. "She wanted a dirtier, more organic underground hip hop sound", Poyser later said to Shook magazine. "So she dealt with cats that brought that sound to the table."

Additional recording sessions and programming took place at Sa-Ra's Cosmic Dust Studio. Sa-Ra member Om'mas Keith remarked on Badu's role at their studio, "Sometimes she’d come through and pick a skeletal and other times the beats would get made right then and there." Keith played instruments such as the Fender Rhodes, Roland Juno-106, and Roland SH-101. Of all her collaborators, Badu only let Husayn write lyrics for her on the album. Husayn said that because Badu had not allowed anyone to do this before, "she had to go through some personal things to come to the point where she'd let somebody write for her in the manner that we did. It was spontaneous but at the same time there was structure to it. It might not have the right expression, or the right enunciation. Writing is so personal. That was a big thing."

=== Electric Lady sessions ===
Badu subsequently held recording sessions at Electric Lady Studios in New York City, where the album was completed. "Everything that the producers e-mailed me I put into GarageBand", she explained to Remix. "Then we would try to duplicate it at Electric Lady. I did vocals on my laptop, babies crying and everything. I also EQ'd the tracks using effects like GarageBand's Vocal Reflection." Badu worked with audio engineers Chris Bell, Tom Soares, and Chavarria. The latter had spent numerous hours with Badu listening to her previous albums, including her 1997 debut Baduizm and its 2000 follow-up Mama's Gun, as well as older albums such as The Dark Side of the Moon (1973) by progressive rock band Pink Floyd and Innervisions (1973) by Stevie Wonder. They worked with the producers' emailed music and embellished their own 2-tracks by using Pro Tools to incorporate live instrumentation such as bass, guitar, flutes, percussion, and keyboards. Contributing musicians included vocalist Georgia Anne Muldrow, trumpeter Roy Hargrove, vibraphonist Roy Ayers, guitarist Omar Rodríguez-López, and vocalist Bilal.

Inspired by Badu's creativity and their time listening to music, Chavarria added special effects and delays to the tracks by using and manipulating a variety of plug-ins and guitar pedals, subsequently reworking effects frequency and modulation parameters. Chavarria said they were able to expand on the producers' tracks rather than change them, because "Erykah made this record to display to the world that there is this whole group of producers out there who are outside of the mainstream making great music." Badu said of the approach, "I work in layers. The first layer is the track. The second layer is the songs. The third would be the musicians who add a certain nuance. And when they play, they play like they are a sample. Or we take a piece of what they played, and we sample and loop it."

Along with a talking drum, Badu used tuning forks when recording New Amerykah Part One to evoke a certain feeling through its frequency, a practice she had done on her previous albums: "Each tuning fork has a certain vibrational energy that is conducive to a feeling or a color or a smell. They're related to different chakras in the body, too. Some may make you feel good or sexy or conscious of what you're saying." The album was mastered at Electric Lady Studios in February 2008. Before it was edited down to 11 tracks, New Amerykah Part One was originally intended as a double album, with 18 songs over two discs.

=== Vocal production ===
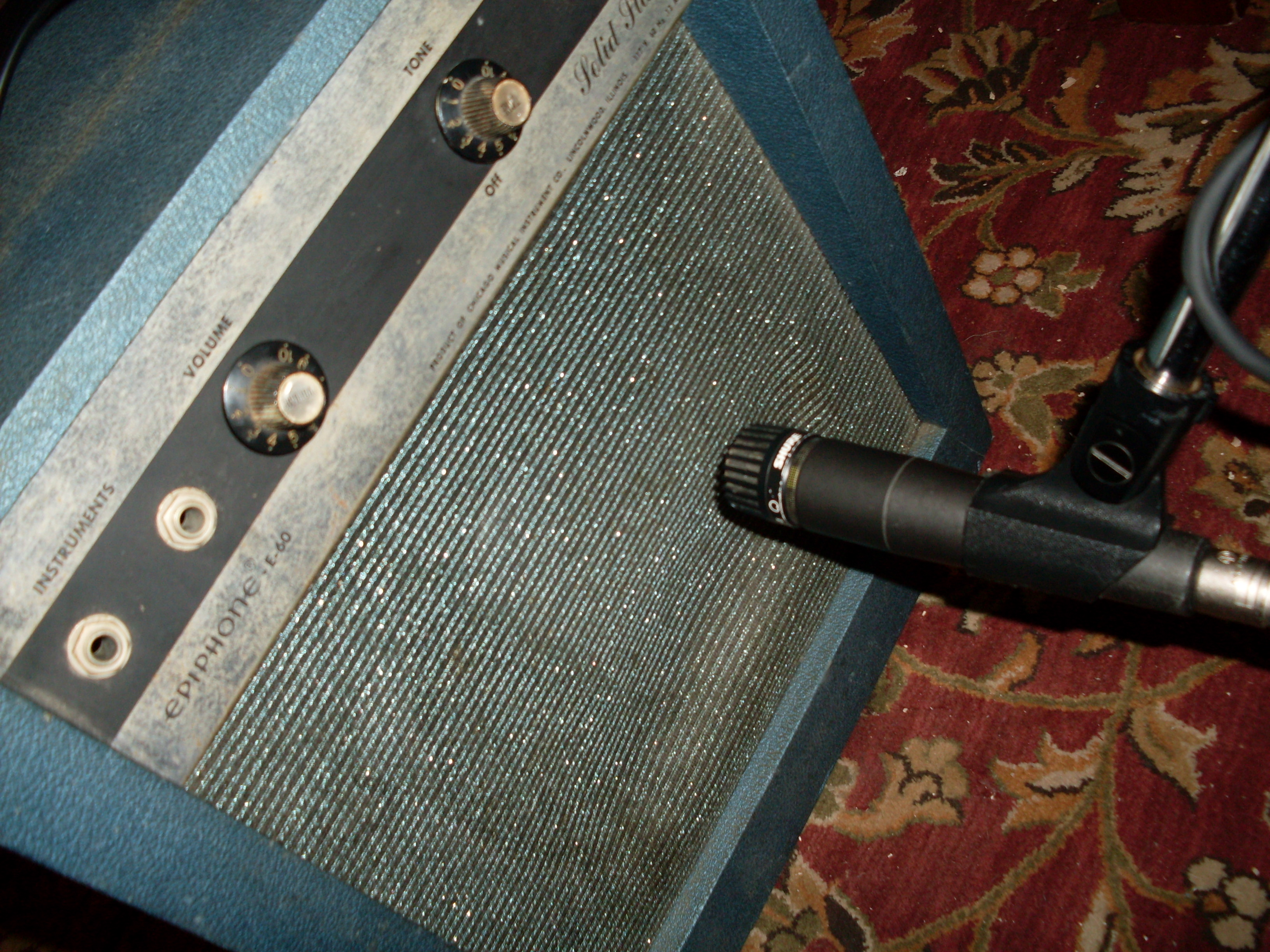
Badu recorded with a Shure SM57 microphone (right).

At Electric Lady, Badu applied a multifaceted approach to recording her vocals and opted against editing them in post-production. Using her voice impressionistically, her vocals were characterized by high scales, varied frequencies, wide intervals, and time-stretched harmonies. Chavarria, who engineered the vocals with Badu, remarked on her singing, "Her voice has so many frequencies, from a subharmonic of her tonic to a thin raspiness, and she wants to hear all of that." Badu used a Shure SM57 dynamic microphone, finding it to have enough bottom for her voice type, and cut vocal takes while situated between two speakers in the studio's control room with the monitor mix playing. She explained this setting to be more comfortable, noting the ability to hear herself sing and hold the microphone when moving around. Badu preferred to sing in one take rather than edit different takes together: "When I do vocals, I am singing with a certain volume in my voice. I am singing the double and triple harmonies at different volumes. You don't have to adjust it; I have already done it. We mix as we go, so by the time we put the vocals to ½-inch tape, I know it. If you touch a damn thing, I will know it."

To adjust to potential audio feedback and leakage and obtain a usable take, Chavarria tried having Badu sit in an overstuffed chair six feet behind the mixing console and use alternate microphones such as a Neumann M 269 or AEA R44 ribbon microphone with Sony MDR-V900 headphones into a Furman headphone mixer. However, Badu felt she could not perceive all of her voice's frequencies with the headphones and often discarded them to move towards the studio monitors. He also considered situating her in an equilateral triangle with the two speakers, one of which would be placed out of phase in order to have the leakage cancel itself. However, according to him, the mic has to be stationary, while Badu "likes to hold the mic like an MC. She is at home as a live performer." He said of working around audio spills and adapting to Badu's methods, "We worked to make her vocals fit into the track, phase-wise ... What did work was to keep the monitors fairly low and turn the microphone out of phase, and we would move her around the room until she found a spot where the leakage was reasonable and where she felt comfortable and could hear herself. But just as often she would just sit in that chair behind the board in the A Room."

== Musical style ==
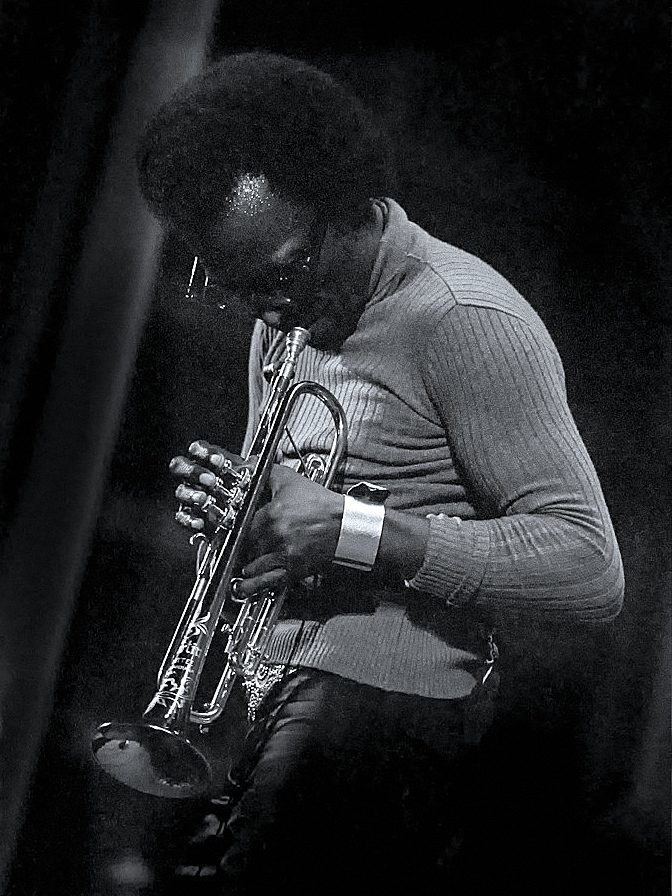
New Amerykah's emphasis on funk sounds and texture over song structure has been compared to the 1972 album On the Corner by Miles Davis (1971).

The album's music is a dense, stylistic amalgam that primarily incorporates funk, soul, and hip hop genres, as well as jazz and electronica. The New Yorker called it "a politically charged neo-soul suite with cutting-edge production", while The Independent critic Andy Gill deemed it a work of psychedelic soul. Nelson George described the record as "a complicated mesh of soul, electro sounds and references, simple and obscure ... a musically challenging album that owes much to Radiohead and Curtis Mayfield". Expanding of the loose, jam-oriented style of Worldwide Underground, it features groove-based instrumentation, murky tones, hip hop musical phrasing, eccentric interludes, and various beats, digital glitches, and samples. Sputnikmusic's Nick Butler said the album "moved beyond the ideas and conventions that have defined neo-soul over the past decade." Greg Kot wrote that, "Like her peers D'Angelo (with Voodoo in 2000), Common (Electric Circus in 2002) and the Roots (Phrenology in 2002), Badu has made a record that defies efforts to categorize it." He remarked that its "murkier, funkier vibe" draws on the "hypnotic funk" of early 1970s albums such as Miles Davis's On the Corner (1972), Herbie Hancock's Sextant (1973), and Sly & the Family Stone's There's a Riot Goin' On (1971). Other critics also drew comparisons to Voodoo and On the Corner, citing New Amerykah's unhurried feel and preference for "sound and mood over choruses and verses".

Similar to Voodoo and On the Corner, New Amerykah Part One emphasizes sound and mood over choruses and verses. The album is unified by a musical theme, with songs sequenced together and typified by ominous musical elements, minor-key melodies, and atmospheric beats. Songs on the album also incorporate experimental hip hop backing tracks and other hip hop elements in a surrealistic manner. The majority of the beats are dark, blunted, and hazy, and have been noted by music writers as conveying an urban soundscape and feeling of paranoia. Lauren Carter of the Boston Herald said the songs often have "the feel of a seance". Most of them were either produced or co-written by members of Sa-Ra, who were known for their sonically dissonant music, characterized by eccentric chord placements and off-time beats. Sasha Frere-Jones believed the record "isn't so much hip-hop as it is a reorganization of the historical flotsam and jetsam that were recycled and turned into hip-hop."

== Lyrics and themes ==
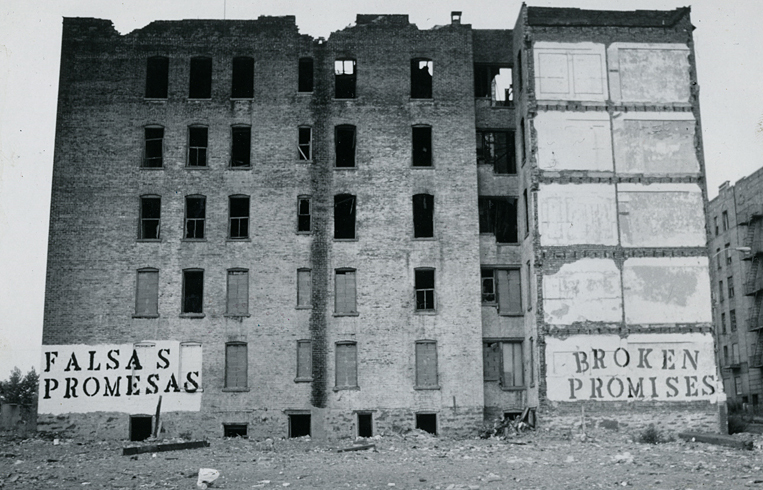
Badu's lyrics make reference to urban decay, disfranchisement, and unfulfilled promises of the American Dream. A South Bronx slum (pictured in 1980), an exemplar of the government's abandonment of cities in the 1970s and 1980s; the text reads "BROKEN PROMISES".

Lyrically, New Amerykah Part One is an esoteric concept album with sociopolitical themes and mostly downbeat subject matter. It features more impersonal topics and social commentary than on Badu's previous work. Its subject matter deals with social concerns and struggles within the African-American community, exploring topics such as institutional racism, religion, poverty, urban violence, the abuse of power, complacency, drug addiction, and nihilism. Badu said she wrote about "poor families, the undermining of the working class, the so-called minority."

According to New York critic Nitsuh Abebe, the record's main theme is the struggle for African Americans to determine their cultural identity in light of the "Civil Rights and post-Civil Rights" era. In Ratliff's opinion, the album's subject matter has been explored before by Mayfield, Marvin Gaye, and Funkadelic, which "suggests that little has changed in nearly 40 years, and perhaps ... that's her point." Quentin B. Huff from PopMatters believed that like Suzanne Vega's 2007 album Beauty & Crime, New Amerykah Part One also incorporated "a post-9/11 worldview, plus a few shots of community spirit, individual growth, pleas for social activism and spiritual enlightenment, and ... the realities of death." He felt that like the "clash in musical styles", some songs "seem committed to having America honor" the promise of the American Dream for African-Americans, while other songs "seem to reject the promise, or at least the idea that the promise can be fulfilled without considerable effort".

Badu's songwriting is characterized by pointillism, stream of consciousness, and scenic narrative. Her lyrics are alternately overtly political and deeply personal, interlaced with Five Percenter notions and references to the Nation of Islam. Badu expresses a motherly perspective and feelings of dismay and empathy for the subjects in the songs. Charles Aaron commented that "a sense of history and maternal compassion ... grounds even her most oblique forays." Abebe wrote similarly, "her keen writing about people" gives songs "much of their shape" and views that her candor helps communicate the album's "social concerns, which could otherwise sound like a laundry list of black-community struggles".

== Songs ==
The opening track "Amerykahn Promise" samples the 1977 song "The American Promise" by American band RAMP as its backing track. The original song was co-written and produced by Roy Ayers, who gave Badu the original master tape for her to rework on her album. Ayers and Edwin Birdsong were inspired to write the song by President Lyndon B. Johnson's 1965 speech "The American Promise", which called for justice and equal rights in the United States. "Amerykahn Promise" features explicit political satire, with themes of disfranchisement and the hindrance of the American Dream. Its tongue-in-cheek subject matter portrays America as a land of broken promises. The song opens with a blaxploitation trailer blurb, saying "more action, more excitement, more everything", and features an improvisatory funk vamp, RAMP vocalists Sibel Thrasher and Sharon Matthews, and an authoritative male voice, performed by Keith. The authoritative character is portrayed as a circus-barker whose smoke and mirrors presentation of the American Dream leads to contentious dialogue with Badu. A female voice at the end of the song asks, "Has anyone seen my 42 laws?", an arcane allusion to the 42 divine laws of ancient Egyptian goddess Maat.

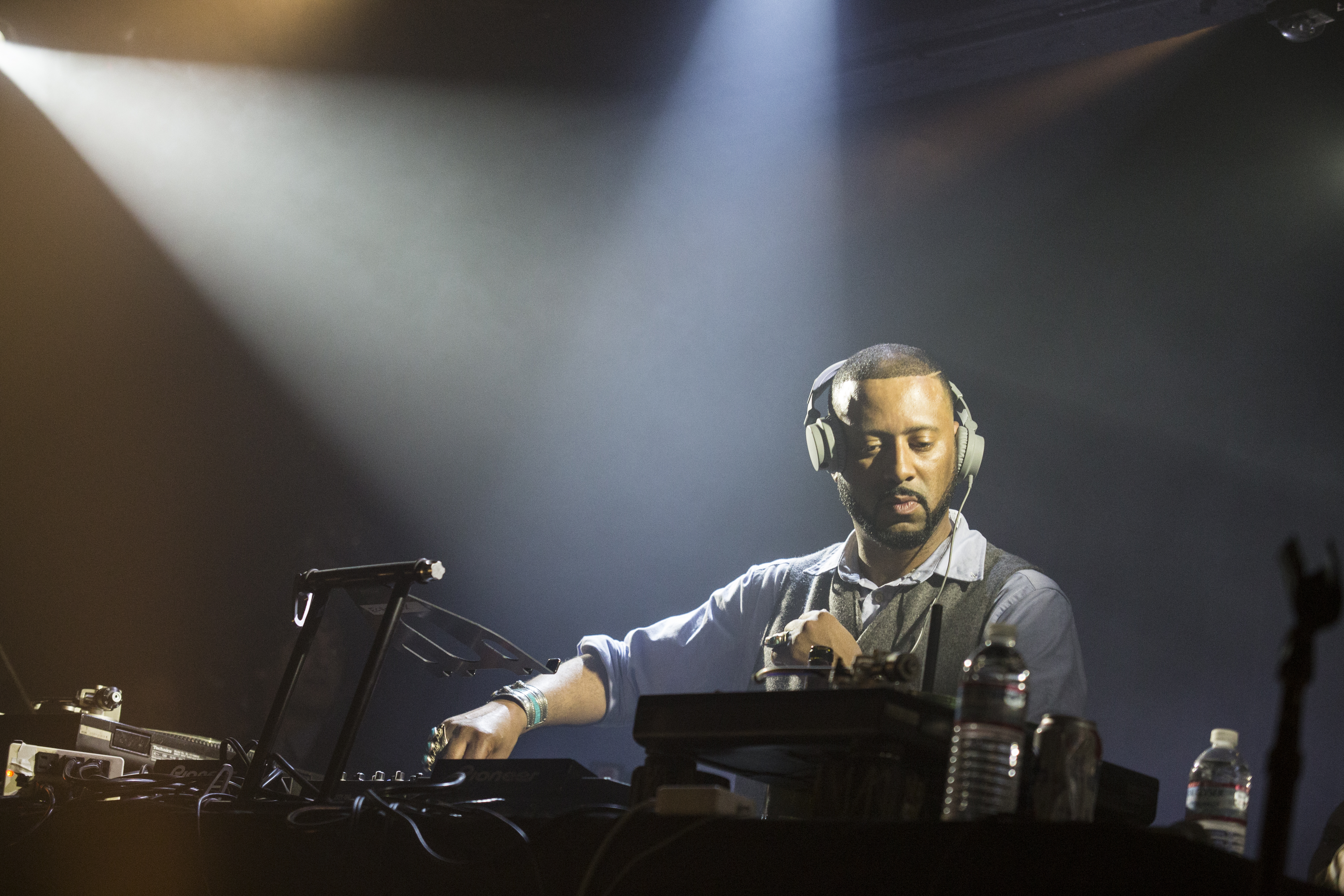
"The Healer" and "My People" were produced by Madlib (pictured in 2014).

Produced by Madlib, "The Healer" is an ode to hip hop culture and a proclamation of its scope. It opens with a brief snippet from a song by Malcolm McLaren featuring the World's Famous Supreme Team. Frere-Jones notes "bells, unidentifiable knocks, a lonesome instrument that might be a sitar, or a guitar, and lots of empty space" in the musical backdrop, adding that "the music flirts with total stasis, though it still has an audible beat." Badu's lyrics, delivered in an incantation style, make reference to various names of God, including Allah, Jehovah, Yahweh, Jah, and Rastafari, while asserting hip hop to be "bigger than" social institutions such as religion and government. She explained the lyrics and religious references, saying "to me, hip-hop is felt in all religions - it has a healing power. I've recently been to Palestine, Jerusalem, Africa and a bunch of other places, and everyone is listening to hip-hop. There's something about that kicking snare sound that all kinds of people find meaning in." The autobiographical song "Me" discusses Badu's thoughts and feelings about her life, including the struggle of growing as a public figure. She mocks others' perception of her, which she has explained as "everything you can see of Erykah Badu — the Ankhs, the powers, the 5 Percenters, the mysteries, it’s all true. The lies; it’s all true. Had two babies with different daddies. Thirty-six years old and addicted to a variety of spending." The song's jazz conclusion has Badu singing about her mother's life and resilience in unison with a muted trumpet.

"Soldier" was written by Badu immediately after receiving Riggins' beat for the song. He said Badu wanted it to have a sound similar to J Dilla and his Detroit hip hop scene, which Riggins was inspired by: "A lot of producers from Detroit have a certain sound, and I think it just comes from being in the city." Its sociopolitical lyrics have Badu expressing sympathy and solidarity for those facing oppression, with references to police corruption, black-on-black crime, and Hurricane Katrina. "The Cell" was produced by Husayn and features a lively, choral style and hard bop feel. Titled as a metaphor for both heredity and confinement, the song is a tableau of crime, drugs, and desperation in urban decay, streamlined by a stark story about Brenda, a character who falls victim to her environment.

Cited by Chavarria as the album's most effects-heavy track, "Twinkle" features a futuristic sound, a convoluted beat, and abstract aural elements such as white noise bursts, high-pitched voices, abrasive instruments, and layers of twinkling keyboard bass. The lyrics lament the plight of the Black community and the cyclical effects on African Americans by the various failures of American social institutions such as the health care, education, and prison systems. Badu raps in the song's verse, "Children of the matrix be hittin’ them car switches / Seen some virgin Virgos hanging out with Venus bitches", followed by her singing, "They don’t know their language, they don’t know their God". Over humming keyboards, the closing minutes of the song feature a speech in the ancient African language of Mdw Ntchr, followed by a speaker's rant inspired by actor Peter Finch's own rant in the 1976 film Network. The speaker angrily laments the state of the world and the complacency of people. Philadelphia Weekly's Craig D. Linsey likened "Twinkle" to a denser version of Marvin Gaye's 1971 song "Inner City Blues (Make Me Wanna Holler)".

"Master Teacher" was conceived by Georgia Anne Muldrow on her Rhodes piano at Sa-Ra's Cosmic Dust Studio with Badu present and was originally intended for one of their albums. Its idyllic music blends mellow soul and glitchy hip hop, featuring a chopped sample of Curtis Mayfield's 1972 song "Freddie's Dead". The song's lyrics envision a higher degree of African-American identity. Its vocalists ask in refrain, "What if there was no niggas, only master teachers?", and answering "I stay woke", with Badu responding "I'm in the search of something new / Search inside me, searching inside you". Midway through the song, Poyser's keyboards lower the music's tempo, with a fluid, jazzy sound. "That Hump" concerns the topic of drug dependency. The closing track "Telephone" is a tribute to J Dilla, who died in 2006 from complications with blood disorder, and has themes of sorrow and hope. It serves as a departure from the preceding songs' edgier musical direction, featuring soft melodies and an acoustic feel similar to Badu's live sound. The song opens with the sound of ominous sirens, referencing J Dilla's 2006 album Donuts. The song's lyrics are based on a story told to Badu by J Dilla's mother on the day of his death. Poyser explained in an interview, "Dilla's mom told Erykah about one day when he was telling her about this dream he had where Ol'Dirty was telling him to get on a different color bus and giving him directions home". According to Poyser, the song's music was inspired by Dilla's passing:

We were in the studio right after Dilla's funeral ... the focus there was more emotional than sonic. It was just feeling Dilla. It was something that wasn’t thought out, it just naturally took place. We were sitting there and we just started jamming and the song just happened instantly.

The hidden track "Honey" is a percussive, lighthearted love song that contains a sample of singer Nancy Wilson's 1978 song "I'm in Love". The track opens with a reprise of "Amerykahn Promise", with an announcer saying, "We hope you enjoyed your journey and now we’re putting control of you back to you", and a countdown leading to "Honey". According to Badu, the song is about "a lover, a fictitious character named Slim, who I'm chasing." AllMusic's Andy Kellman commented that the song is included as an unlisted track as "it doesn't fit into the album's fabric, what with its drifting, deeply sweetened, synth-squish-and-string-drift groove."

== Title and packaging ==
Before New Amerykah's release, the album was tentatively called KahBa, which Badu derived from her name, as a reference to Islam and Kemetism. The title of the album series, New Amerykah, is a pun of Badu's name. She has explained one meaning of it as "a statement that simply says, 'This is the beginning of the new world'-for both the slaves and the slave masters. In other words, everybody has to wake up and see. This new world moves much faster. We don't even realize how fast we're moving." Part One's subtitle, 4th World War, reflects the content's objective, political leanings, which Badu explained to be "outside of me ... What’s going on outside is the left brain". Badu further explained New Amerykah's title in an interview for Remix:

In 1997, a 25-year-old Erykah Badu came out as an artist, pregnant, a mother-to-be. We used to bring cassettes home as our listening from the studio. No one had a cell phone, only a couple people with these great big contraptions. The Internet was not our form of communication; we still had the library. We were creating from sand and scrap. So quickly it's turned into this technological society. I can send the album to millions of fans from Antarctica to Mexico City with one push of the button. The way our children think and the things they see? It's new, and it's happened so quick. And I am in the middle of that. Me on the platform with a microphone — that is how I envision New Amerykah.

The album's cover and interior artwork were designed by Badu and graphic artist Emek. The cover features an abstract portrayal of Badu, who dons vintage nameplate knuckle rings bearing the album title and an Afro decorated in a bric-a-brac manner with various emblems. Badu and Emek sought to reflect the former's perspective on various topics, including music, religion, governments, and economics, and incorporate emblems to depict American culture and modern society. Images featured in the Afro include those of flowers, spray cans, dollar signs, power plants, musical notes, toilets, raised fists, needles, laptops, turntables, handcuffs, broken chains, bar codes, drugs, and guns. The album's interior artwork features ominous, psychedelic, futuristic, and apocalyptic imagery. The artwork includes illustrations of a red-eyed Uncle Sam pointing a gun, robotic creatures tattooing each other, a bar code bearing the alphanumeric message "50C1AL 5Y5T3M", and a suited skeleton with a dollar sign on its skull lecturing to a headless audience from a podium that bears the pyramid image from the reverse of the Great Seal of the United States. The illustration of a soft melting fork, hypodermic needle, and spoon is an adaptation of Salvador Dalí's 1931 painting The Persistence of Memory.

== Marketing and sales ==
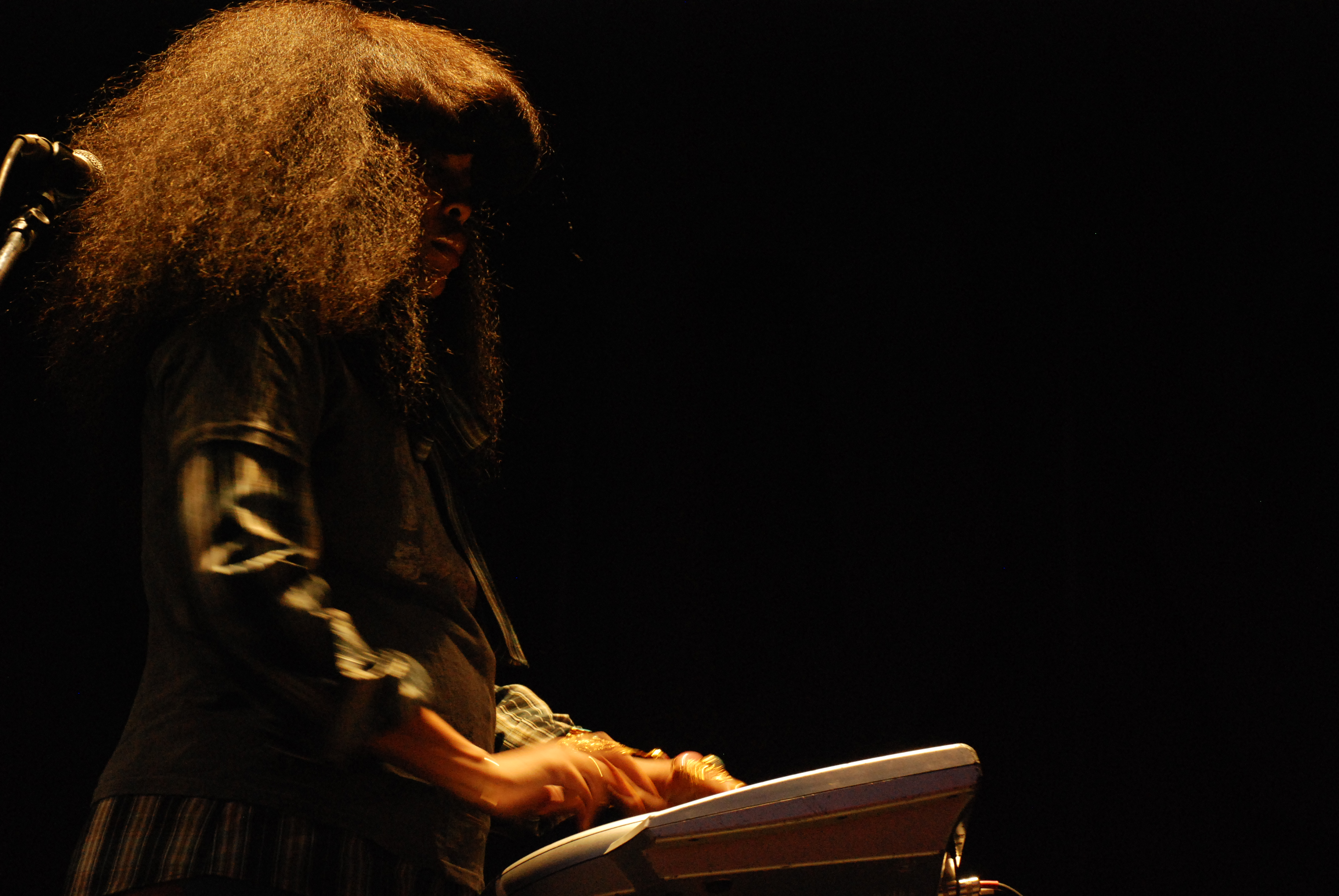
Badu performing at The Voodoo Music Experience in 2008

The album's lead single, "Honey", was released on December 11, 2007. It reached number 88 on the US Billboard Hot 100, on which it spent three weeks. On the Hot R&B/Hip-Hop Songs, it charted for 17 weeks and peaked at number 22. A music video for the song was directed by Badu and Chris Robinson, and released on January 28, 2008. Badu wanted to pay homage to classic records with the video, which is set in a small business record store and follows a customer as she looks through vintage R&B, hip hop, and rock LPs, whose album covers are depicted as moving images with Badu cast in them. In January 2008, Badu also previewed songs from the album as a headlining act at the Barbados Jazz Festival. On April 23, she released "Soldier" as the album's second single and announced The Vortex World Tour, a supporting tour to promote the album. The tour's 42 concert dates included shows in the United States, Canada, and Aruba, spanned from May to June, and featured hip hop band The Roots as Badu's opening act. She later toured in Europe during June and July.

New Amerykah Part One was released by Universal Motown Records in the United States on February 26, Badu's 37th birthday. That same day, a release party took place at the House of Blues in Dallas, and Badu performed songs from the album on VH1 Soul's SoulStage. The record was released in several European countries on February 29, the United Kingdom on March 3, and Japan on March 12. The Japanese and UK editions feature the bonus track "Real Thang". The album's digital release to the iTunes Store featured the song's "Tumbling Dice Remix" as a bonus track. It was also released as a double vinyl LP on March 11, and on USB stick format. Of the accompanying USB stick, Badu told the Chicago Tribune that "I might as well give a digital world what they need and what they want. And that's to just cut out the middle man, which is the CD, which will be extinct, I would say, in about seven to eight years — right along with the record labels."

In the first week of release, New Amerykah Part One debuted at number two on the Billboard 200 chart, selling 125,000 copies in the US. It was Badu's best opening sales week since her debut album Baduizm in 1997. It also entered at number two on the Billboard Top R&B/Hip-Hop Albums. In its second week, the album sold 41,466 copies, and 35,000 in its third week. It spent 15 weeks on the Billboard 200 and 29 weeks on the Top R&B/Hip-Hop Albums. By December 2009, it had sold 359,000 copies, according to Nielsen SoundScan. In the United Kingdom, New Amerykah Part One charted at number 55 on the British albums chart, on which it spent one week. In France, it debuted at number 49 and spent 11 weeks on the French albums chart. In Switzerland, it debuted at number 10 and spent six weeks on the Swiss chart. In the Netherlands, the album entered at number 25 and spent seven weeks on the Mega Album Top 100. In Poland, it reached number nine and spent eight weeks on the Polish chart. The album's highest international charting was number five in Sweden, where it charted for seven weeks.

== Critical reception ==
Professional ratings
Aggregate scores
Source	Rating
Metacritic	83/100
Review scores
Source	Rating
AllMusic	5/5 stars
The A.V. Club	B
Entertainment Weekly	A−
The Guardian	5/5 stars
Los Angeles Times	3.5/4 stars
Mojo	4/5 stars
The Observer	4/5 stars
Pitchfork	7.8/10
Rolling Stone	3/5 stars
Uncut	4/5 stars

New Amerykah Part One was met with widespread critical acclaim. At Metacritic, which assigns a normalized rating out of 100 to reviews from professional critics, the album received an average score of 83, based on 27 reviews. Slant Magazine's Eric Henderson said it is a powerful listen that stands as Badu's most musically ambitious work, and Ernest Hardy of the Los Angeles Times hailed it as "a collection of demanding, disquieting and beautiful urban hymns that reveal their rewards on repeated listenings". Sasha Frere-Jones from The New Yorker described the album as "a brilliant resurgence of black avant-garde vocal pop" and "the work of a restless polymath ignoring the world around her and opting for an idiosyncratic, murky feeling that reflects her impulses." In the Chicago Tribune, Kot wrote that "art this deeply personal" is rarely an easy listen, while Alex Macpherson of The Guardian deemed it a rewarding listen that "demands to be explored." Within the context of the late 2000s' resurgence in classic soul styles across American and British music, Badu's experimental and militant efforts on the album were viewed by The Observer's Steve Yates as "a giant leap forward". According to Pitchfork's Nitsuh Abebe:

A lot of the critical love for New Amerykah seems rooted in a love for the music of ... a time in which popular black artists made records filled not only with visionary, avant-garde sounds, but with a social expansiveness, a fire and ambition to say something important to and for a community. ... Big tracks aside, it's an awfully static record, which gives it the kind of high-art 'difficulty' that we critics have been known to like.

Some reviewers were less enthusiastic. Lauren Murphy from Hot Press was impressed by the project's ambition but believed it played less smoothly and cohesively than Badu's previous albums. Rolling Stone magazine's Christian Hoard found the singer's socially conscious lyrics unexceptional and too ambiguous, while regarding some songs as "absent-minded doodles". In MSN Music, Robert Christgau gave it a three-star honorable mention, indicating an enjoyable effort, while citing "Amerykahn Promise" and "The Cell" as highlights, but said some of the themes seemed dated in comparison to the music: "When your funk is this futuristic, not to say abstract, astrology and Farrakhan sound old, not to say ignorant".

At the end of 2008, New Amerykah Part One was ranked on several critics' lists of the year's best records, including the Associated Press (number 1), The Austin Chronicle (number 9), Entertainment Weekly (number 5), New York (number 8), The New York Times (number 4), The A.V. Club (number 8), PopMatters (number 4), Slant Magazine (number 8), and The Guardian (number 9). Spin ranked the album number 12 on its year-end list, calling it "laptop R&B that uses hip-hop as its muse". Pitchfork later ranked it at number 133 on their list of top 200 albums of the 2000s decade, while Rhapsody named it the decade's best R&B record. In 2019, it was voted 92nd in The Guardian's "The 100 best albums of the 21st century", which polled 45 music journalists.

== Track listing ==
No.	Title	Writer(s)	Producer(s)	Length
1.	"Amerykahn Promise"	William Allen; Roy Ayers; Edwin Birdsong	Ayers; Erykah Badu (add.); Mike "Chav" Chavarria (add.); Edwin Birdsong (co.); Allen (co.)	4:16
2.	"The Healer"	Badu; Daniel Vangarde; Otis Jackson Jr.; Malcolm McLaren	Madlib	3:59
3.	"Me"	Badu; Shafiq Husayn	Badu; Husayn	5:36
4.	"My People"	Badu; Jackson; Anita Poree; Leonard Caston Jr.	Madlib	3:25
5.	"Soldier"	Badu; Karriem Riggins; Tom Barlage; Willem Ennes; Hans Waterman; Guus Willemse	Badu; Riggins	5:04
6.	"The Cell"	Badu; Husayn	Badu; Husayn	4:21
7.	"Twinkle"	Badu; Husayn; Taz Arnold; Om'Mas Keith	Badu; Husayn; Chavarria; Arnold	6:57
8.	"Master Teacher"	Husayn; Curtis Mayfield; Georgia Anne Muldrow	Husayn; Muldrow	6:48
9.	"That Hump"	Badu; Keith	Badu; Husayn; Keith	5:25
10.	"Telephone"	Badu; James Poyser; Ahmir Thompson	Badu; Poyser; Thompson	7:48
11.	"Honey"	Badu; Patrick Douthit; Clarence McDonald; Fritz Baskett; David Shields	9th Wonder	5:21

• (add.) Additional production
• (co.) Co-producer

Belgium/Japan/Australia bonus tracks
No.	Title	Writer(s)	Producer(s)	Length
11.	"Real Thang"	Jackson; Wright	Madlib	3:52
12.	"Honey" (unlisted bonus track)	Baskett; Douthit; McDonald; Shields; Wright	9th Wonder	5:21

=== Sample credits ===
- "Amerykahn Promise" contains a sample of "American Promise" (1977) performed by RAMP.
- "The Healer" contains a sample of "Kono Samuraï" (1971) performed by The Yamasuki Singers.
- "My People" contains a sample of "My People...Hold On" (1972) performed by Eddie Kendricks.
- "Soldier" contains a sample of "Theme" performed by Solution.
- "Master Teacher" contains a sample of "Freddie's Dead" (1972) performed by Curtis Mayfield.
- "Honey" contains a sample of "I'm in Love" (1978) performed by Nancy Wilson.

== Personnel ==
Credits are adapted from the album's liner notes.

- William Allen – arranger (track 1)
- Roy Ayers – arranger (track 1)
- Chris Athens – mastering (track 11)
- Erykah Badu – art direction, design, executive producer, percussion (tracks 4, 6), re-recording engineer (1), remixing (1), talking drum (4), vocal arrangement (3, 5), vocals (All tracks)
- Marc Baptiste – photography
- Kyledidthis – art direction and design
- Chris Bell – recording engineer (tracks 2–11)
- Bilal – guest vocals (tracks 2, 4, 7–8)
- Edwin Birdsong – arranger (track 1)
- Steve "Thunder Cat" Bruner – bass (tracks 3, 6, 8–9)
- Mike "Chav" Chavarria – additional music programming (tracks 2, 7), additional vocals (5), co-executive producer, sound effects (2, 7), guitar (10), recording engineer (1–9), mixing (all tracks)
- Shanti Das – marketing
- Mike Elizondo – bass (track 10)
- James Patrick Green – engineer (track 1)
- Alfredo Gray – additional vocals (track 5)
- Roy Hargrove – horns (track 3)
- Shafiq Husayn – arp strings (track 8), associate producer, recording engineer (8), keyboards, music programming (8)
- Jay Electronica – associate producer
- Jef Lee Johnson – guitar (tracks 3, 7)
- Ronald Albert Johnson – engineer (track 1)
- Om'Mas Keith – recording engineer (tracks 8–9), keyboards (9), synthesizer bass (9), trap drums (9)
- Alex Kruse – assistant recording engineer (track 9)
- Josef Leimberg – percussion, talking drum (track 4)
- Georgia Anne Muldrow – freestyled lyrics (track 8), keyboards, vocals (8)
- James Poyser – keyboards (track 3, 9–10)
- RAMP – vocals (track 1)
- Karriem Riggins – trap drums (track 9)
- Omar Rodríguez-López – guitar (track 7)
- Kay K Rosemond – additional vocals (track 5)
- Tom Soares – additional engineering (track 5), mixing (tracks 1–10), re-recording engineer (1), vocal re-recording (10)
- Jerry Soloman – engineer (track 1)
- Ahmir "Questlove" Thompson – drums (track 10)
- Ty & Kory – additional vocals (track 8)

== Charts ==
=== Weekly charts ===
Chart (2008)	Peak position
Australian Albums (ARIA)	174
Austrian Albums (Ö3 Austria)	39
Belgian Albums (Ultratop Flanders)	32
Dutch Albums (Album Top 100)	25
Finnish Albums (Suomen virallinen lista)	30
French Albums (SNEP)	49
German Albums (Offizielle Top 100)	44
Italian Albums (FIMI)	51
Japanese Albums (Oricon)	64
Norwegian Albums (VG-lista)	13
Polish Albums Chart	9
Swedish Albums (Sverigetopplistan)	5
Swiss Albums (Schweizer Hitparade)	10
UK Albums (Official Charts)	55
UK R&B Albums (Official Charts)	5
US Billboard 200	2
US Top R&B/Hip-Hop Albums (Billboard)	2

=== Year-end charts ===
Chart (2008)	Position
US Billboard 200	129
US Top R&B/Hip-Hop Albums (Billboard)	25

== See also ==
- Airtight's Revenge, a 2010 album by singer-songwriter and fellow Soulquarian member Bilal, also conceived using GarageBand
- Afrofuturism
- Hip hop production
