= The Hollywood Recordings =

Studio album by Sa-Ra Creative Partners
- Released: April 24, 2007
- Genre: Hip hop
- Length: 66:02
- Label: Babygrande
- Producer: Sa-Ra Creative Partners

Sa-Ra Creative Partners chronology
The Hollywood Recordings (2007)	Nuclear Evolution: The Age of Love (2009)

The Hollywood Recordings is the debut studio album by American hip hop group Sa-Ra Creative Partners. It was released on Babygrande Records in 2007.

== Release and reception ==
Professional ratings
Review scores
Source	Rating
AllMusic	4/5 stars
BBC	favorable
Entertainment Weekly	A−
Exclaim!	mixed
XLR8R	favorable

== Track listing ==
All songs produced by Sa-Ra, except where noted.

No.	Title	Producer(s)	Length
1.	"Seagulls (Intro)"		1:00
2.	"Hey Love"		3:15
3.	"Glorious"		4:41
4.	"So Special" (featuring Rozzi Daime)		3:35
5.	"And If" (featuring Ty Dolla $ign)	Shafiq Husayn; Taz Arnold	2:37
6.	"Rosebuds"		4:18
7.	"Feel the Bass" (featuring Talib Kweli)	Om'Mas Keith	3:01
8.	"Not on Our Level" (featuring Capone-N-Noreaga and Lord Nez)	Keith; Husayn	3:35
9.	"White! (On the Floor)"		2:58
10.	"Bitch"		3:23
11.	"Do Me Gurl" (featuring Ty Dolla $ign)	Husayn; Arnold	3:57
12.	"Ladies Sing"		3:31
13.	"Sweet Sour You" (featuring Bilal)		3:23
14.	"Tracy" (featuring Rozzi Daime)	Husayn	2:25
15.	"Fly Away" (featuring Erykah Badu and Georgia Anne Muldrow)		4:12
16.	"Lean on Me" (featuring Kurupt, Lord Nez, and Erika Rose)	Keith; Husayn	3:32
17.	"Fish Fillet" (featuring Pharaohe Monch)		3:38
18.	"Thrilla" (featuring J Dilla)		3:59
19.	"Hollywood (Redux)"	Keith	5:31

== Charts ==
Chart	Peak position
US Heatseekers Albums (Billboard)	12
US Independent Albums (Billboard)	27
US Top R&B/Hip-Hop Albums (Billboard)	44
US Rap Albums (Billboard)	20
