= Summer Tour (Erykah Badu) =

2006 concert tour by Erykah Badu

- Tour by Erykah Badu
- Start date: June 10, 2006
- End date: August 13, 2006
- Legs: 4
- No. of shows: 8 in North America; 12 in Europe; 2 in Asia; 22 in total

Erykah Badu concert chronology
- Sugar Water Festival (2005–06); Summer Tour (2006); The Vortex World Tour (2008)

The "Summer Tour 2006" was a concert tour headlined by American neo soul and R&B singer-songwriter Erykah Badu. The tour started on June 10, 2006, in Knoxville, Tennessee, and ended on August 13 of that year in Columbia, Maryland, with dates in the United States (including Hawaii), Japan and Europe. Following this, Badu co-headlined dates in August with Jill Scott and Queen Latifah as part of their joint Sugar Water Tour.

== Set list ==
1. "Band Jam Intro"
2. "Your My"
3. "Suga"/"Kiss Me On My Neck"
4. "I Want You"
5. "Cleva"
6. "Back in the Day (Puff)" ^{1}
7. "Black Ghost"
8. "Other Side of the Game"
9. "Danger"
10. "On & On" / "...& On"
11. "Penitentiary Philosophy"
12. "Orange Moon" ^{1}
13. "Didn't Cha Know?"
14. "Green Eyes"
15. "Love of My Life (An Ode to Hip-Hop)" (contains elements of "Rapper's Delight" and "Gangsta Gangsta")
16. "Tyrone"
17. "Bag Lady"

^{1} performed only at select dates in North America and Europe.

== Band ==
- Director/Keyboards: R.C. Williams
- Percussion: James Clemons
- Bass: Braylon Lacy
- Flute: Dwayne Kerr
- Drums: Christopher Dave
- DJ: Burtron Smith
- VJ: Kerwin Detracy Devonish
- Background vocals: Eugenia Bess, Keisha Jackson

== Tour dates ==
Date	City	Country	Venue
North America
February 26, 2006^{[A]}	Charlotte	United States	Ovens Auditorium
May 19, 2006^{[B]}	New York	United States	Radio City Music Hall
June 10, 2006	Knoxville	United States	Caswell Park
June 17, 2006	Baltimore	United States	Oriole Park at Camden Yards
June 29, 2006	Honolulu	United States	Pipeline Cafe
Asia
July 1, 2006	Osaka	Japan	Osaka-jō Hall
July 2, 2006	Tokyo	Japan	Makuhari Messe
Europe
July 7, 2006	Bruges	Belgium	Minnewaterpark
July 11, 2006	Warsaw	Poland	Grand Theatre
July 13, 2006	Zürich	Switzerland	Maag Halle
July 14, 2006	London	United Kingdom	Somerset House
July 15, 2006	London	United Kingdom	Somerset House
July 16, 2006	Rotterdam	Netherlands	Rotterdam Ahoy
July 17, 2006	Rome	Italy	Parco della Musica
July 19, 2006	Nice	France	Arènes et Jardins de Cimiez
July 20, 2006	Barcelona	Spain	Poble Espanyol
July 21, 2006	Málaga	Spain	Teatro Cervantes de Málaga
July 22, 2006	San Sebastián	Spain	Kursaal Auditorium
July 24, 2006	Madrid	Spain	Cuartel del Conde-Duque
North America
August 3, 2006	Grand Prairie	United States	Nokia Theatre at Grand Prairie
August 5, 2006	Atlanta	United States	Chastain Park Amphitheater
August 12, 2006	New York	United States	Prospect Park Bandshell
August 13, 2006	Columbia	United States	Merriweather Post Pavilion

Concerts and other miscellaneous performances
^{A} This performance was part of Dave Chappelle's Block Party 2006 at Ovens Auditorium, Charlotte, North Carolina.
^{B} This performance was part of The Roots & Friends at Radio City Music Hall, New York City.
