= Om'Mas Keith =

- Born: December 20, 1976 (age 49); Queens, New York City, U.S.
- Genres: Hip hop; neo soul; jazz fusion; alternative rock; electronica
- Occupations: Record producer; musician; composer; engineer; songwriter
- Instruments: Vocals; keyboards; bass guitar; drums; guitar; flute; percussion
- Years active: 1999–present
- Label: Atlantic
- Website: ommas.com

Om'Mas Leachim Keith (born December 20, 1976), also known simply as Om'Mas, is a Grammy Award-winning record producer, musician, composer, engineer, and songwriter from Queens, New York. He has worked with Frank Ocean, Erykah Badu, John Legend, Jay-Z, Kevin Abstract, and Vic Mensa. He is also known as a member of The Sa-Ra Creative Partners, alongside Taz Arnold and Shafiq Husayn.

== Early life ==
Om'Mas Keith was born on December 20, 1976, in Queens, New York. Keith was exposed to music from an early age, as his parents were both avant-garde jazz musicians, working alongside Sun Ra, and his grandfather had a musical career working with Duke Ellington. His name is derived from Om, the sacred sound of the universe according to Indian religions.

== Music career ==
Keith's music career began in 1994, when he took an internship with RCA records in New York City, after having performed poorly at John Bowne High School by skipping academic classes to participate in band. He also attended the Institute of Audio Research, but left before completion to focus on his internship and music production. He garnered the attention of Jam Master Jay, who took him under his wing, along with Ice-T, Ol' Dirty Bastard, Suave House's Tony Draper, and Ultramagnetic MCs, who flew him to Los Angeles and enlisted his work as a producer, where he met his Sa-Ra bandmate Shafiq Husayn.

While building his early career as a producer, Keith also worked in advertising, and as a studio manager and designer while trying to support his daughter, who was born in 1997

=== Sa-Ra ===
In early 2000, Om'Mas Keith moved from New York to Los Angeles, working full-time as a musician and producer. He partnered with Shafiq Husayn and Taz Arnold to form alternative hip-hop group Sa-Ra. The group produced for other artists, such as Jurassic 5, Pharoahe Monch, and Erykah Badu, and released their own music. Their first album, The Hollywood Recordings, was released in 2007 under Babygrande Records. The album had been anticipated to be released under Kanye West's GOOD Music, who the trio signed with in 2005, but the label was dissolved beforehand. The album bestowed features from Talib Kweli, Bilal, and Ty Dolla $ign, as well as many others. Keith brought attention to Sa-Ra while appearing on Diddy's show Making His Band, which aired on MTV.

The group released their sophomore album Nuclear Evolution: The Age of Love, in 2009, with features from Erykah Badu and Gary Bartz.

=== Later career ===
In 2009, through music producer Michael Uzowuru, Keith was introduced to Odd Future members Tyler, The Creator and Frank Ocean. Ocean had already been working on his debut studio album, Channel ORANGE, and recruited Keith to assist him with production and vocals. The album was released worldwide in July 2012 to positive critical reception, and subsequently nominated in 2013 for a Grammy Award in four categories: Album of the Year, Best New Artist, Record of the Year, and Best Urban Contemporary Album, for which it won.

Keith was credited for his work on Jay Z and Kanye West's 2011 album, Watch the Throne. In 2013, alongside producing on Channel ORANGE, he released his first independent album City Pulse and was credited on Odd Future's Earl Sweatshirt's album Doris.

In August 2016, Frank Ocean released Endless and Blonde, crediting Keith as a contributor on both. Blonde's single Nikes was produced by Keith, and he received writing credits on eleven other tracks on the album.

== Philanthropy ==
Since his Grammy win in 2013, Keith has heavily been involved with MusiCares, a foundation that aims to assist musicians and their families in times of financial crisis or medical emergency. Alongside Pharrell Williams, he has worked with outreach programs dedicated to educating young musicians. He currently serves as a member of the Recording Academy's Los Angeles Chapter Board.

== Discography ==
The following is a partial discography of production.

=== Albums ===
- City Pulse (2013)

=== With Sa-Ra ===
- The Hollywood Recordings (2007)
- Nuclear Evolution: The Age of Love (2009)

=== Songs as Featured Artist ===
- "Cute Girls" by Patrick Stump (2011)

== Filmography ==
=== Television ===
- Making the Band
- Tracks (2016)

=== Film ===
- Across the Board (2016)
- The Black Power Mixtape 1967–1975 (score) (2011)

== Awards ==
- Grammy Award for Best Urban Contemporary Album (2013)
- Guldbagge Award for Best Original Score (alongside Questlove) (2011)
