= Sylvia Striplin =

American musician (1954–2013)

Sylvia Striplin (March 23, 1954 - March 2, 2013) was a New York-based jazz, soul, and R&B vocalist. Sylvia was the youngest of five children. After a fire destroyed their home in the Sugar Hill section of Harlem, the family moved to the North Bronx in New York — there Sylvia honed her craft. Sylvia loved singing. She made up songs on the family piano and sang them around the house. She took piano lessons during her grade school years and performed in recitals. She began singing professionally with neighborhood friends Gus Falcon and Malcolm Ballinger as a teenager. After high school, Sylvia attended the City College of New York in Harlem where she was praised for her performance in the College's production of Anything Goes.

During the 1970s, Sylvia found work as a backup singer. In the late 1970s she auditioned for the role of Dorothy in The Wiz and was selected as the second understudy with the New York Company. She was eventually selected to play Dorothy in the road company production, which traveled to Miami, Chicago, Los Angeles, and other cities, receiving excellent reviews along the way.

During the late 1970s, Sylvia became a member of Aquarian Dream and worked with funk, jazz, R&B, and soul vibraphonist Roy Ayers in his group Eighties Ladies. She was eventually signed to his Uno Melodic record label. where she recorded an album with him, an extended single of her own—"Give Me Your Love"—then her first solo album of the same name Give Me Your Love.

Her song "You Can't Turn Me Away," the flip side of her single and a track on her solo album, was featured in Grand Theft Auto: Vice City Stories, playing on quiet storm station VCFL. It was also in the romantic comedy film Prime and the mini-film Ecology of Love with Pharrell Williams. This song also served as the basis for the Notorious B.I.G./Junior M.A.F.I.A. hit, "Get Money" on Big Beat/Atlantic Records. Big Beat label chief Craig Kallman is the judge in the video of the song, which then received numerous awards. Erykah Badu also covered the song on her 2010 track "Turn Me Away (Get MuNNY)," which appeared on the album New Amerykah Part Two (Return of the Ankh). "Give Me Your Love" was sampled by Armand Van Helden in "Full Moon" (featuring Common).

Striplin's last known release was “Keep Pushing”.

== Discography ==
- Give Me Your Love (Uno Melodic Records, 1981)
- Keep Pushing (Rissa Crissa, 1982)
