= New Amerykah Part Two (Return of the Ankh) =

Studio album by Erykah Badu
- Released: March 30, 2010
- Studios: Electric Lady, New York
- Genres: R&B; neo soul
- Length: 50:35
- Labels: Control Freaq; Universal Motown
- Producers: Erykah Badu; 9th Wonder; James Poyser; Sa-Ra; Ta'Raach; Madlib; J Dilla; Mike "Chav" Chavarria; Karriem Riggins; Georgia Anne Muldrow; Questlove; RC Williams; Jahborn

Erykah Badu chronology
New Amerykah Part One (4th World War) (2008)	New Amerykah Part Two (Return of the Ankh) (2010)	But You Caint Use My Phone (2015)

Singles from New Amerykah Part Two (Return of the Ankh)
- 1. "Window Seat" Released: February 5, 2010; 2. "Turn Me Away (Get MuNNY)" Released: March 24, 2010; 3. "Gone Baby, Don't Be Long" Released: February 2011

New Amerykah Part Two (Return of the Ankh) is the fifth studio album by American recording artist Erykah Badu, first released on March 30, 2010, through Control Freaq and Universal Motown. Collaborating with several hip hop producers over the Internet, Badu conceived 75 songs set to be split over three albums with New Amerykah Part One (4th World War) (2008) being the first. The album was recorded primarily at Electric Lady Studios in New York City.

Contrasting its socially themed and complex predecessor, New Amerykah Part Two contains a prominently groove-based, analog sound. The album incorporates sampling and live instrumentation, while its more personal lyrics focus on themes of romance and relationships. The production for the album was handled by several of Badu's previous collaborators, including J Dilla, Questlove, James Poyser, Madlib, 9th Wonder, Sa-Ra, Georgia Anne Muldrow, and Karriem Riggins, along with appearances from Lil Wayne, Bilal, and harpist Kirsten Agresta.

New Amerykah Part Two (Return of the Ankh) received widespread critical acclaim from critics, who commended its soulful sound and loose structure, and viewed it as more accessible than that of its predecessor. The album was ranked as one of the best albums of 2010 and the decade by several publications. It debuted at number four on the US Billboard 200 chart, selling 110,000 copies in its first week. As of 2011, it has sold around 300,000 copies in United States. The album produced three singles, "Window Seat", "Turn Me Away (Get MuNNY)", and "Gone Baby, Don't Be Long".

== Writing and recording ==
In 2004, Badu received her first computer as a Christmas gift from drummer and producer Ahmir "Questlove" Thompson, and began communicating with and receiving music from him and other producers such as Q-Tip and J Dilla. Beginning in 2005, Badu worked from her home in Dallas and used the software application GarageBand as a digital audio workstation, which she was introduced to by her son, Seven. He taught her how to use her laptop as a mini recording studio, and she used it to construct various backing tracks for songs. Using GarageBand, she recorded demos of her vocals by singing into the computer's microphone.

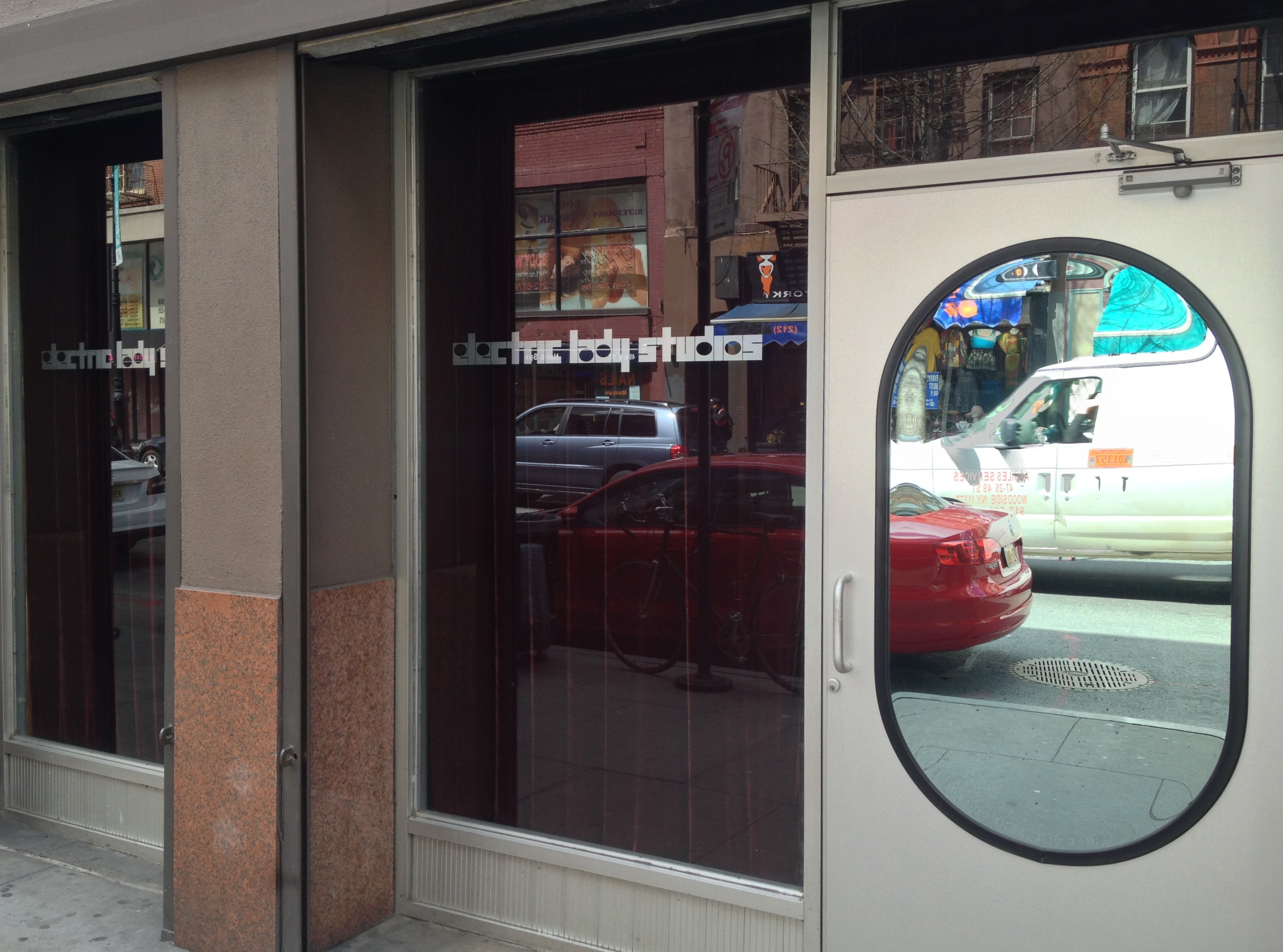
A portion of the album was recorded at the Electric Lady Studios.

She composed more than 75 songs within the year and intended on splitting them among her planned series of New Amerykah albums. She said of her productivity with her laptop, "I could be here, in my own space, with headphones on, and the kids could be doing what they doing, and I’m cooking dinner still, I’m making juices still, and it’s so easy just to sing. You got an idea — boom! Idea, boom!" Badu's iChat contacts, including hip hop producers Questlove, Madlib, 9th Wonder, and J Dilla, instant messaged her to get back into the studio and sent her tracks. Such exchanges inspired a creative spark for Badu, which she explained in an interview for the Dallas Observer, "I started to accept that maybe it's OK for me to put out music, and it doesn't have to be something dynamic or world-changing. But just as I was accepting that, here comes this burst of light and energy and creativity. And that's the process, I guess, of life—the detachment and the release of something gives you even more room to grow or be creative."

A portion of the album was recorded at New York City's Electric Lady Studios. She told Rolling Stone that she recorded her vocals for the song "Window Seat" in her shower, stating "I wanted to sound like I was in a tunnel. I got my laptop and closed the door." In an interview for Billboard, Badu explained that "we used a lot of analog instruments—harps, strings, drums, piano, and even a Theremin—to give the album that sonic feel. There's a strong undercurrent of bottom, a rumbling to these songs that feels good to me. It feels like a hug."

== Music and lyrics ==
In contrast to its predecessor New Amerykah Part One (4th World War) (2008), which was digitally produced and political in tone, New Amerykah Part Two (Return of the Ankh) incorporates sampling and live instrumentation, while its more personal lyrics focus on themes of romance and relationships. "Return of the Ankh" was seen as a departure from the experimental work of New Amerykah Part One (4th World War) and a return to the musical style of Badu's earlier catalogue, particularly the jazz elements of Badu's debut, Baduizm (1997). The album's style and production is characterized as being down-tempo, built around soul and jazz. Badu has described its sound as "very analog". According to Exclaim! critic Ryan B. Patrick, New Amerykah Part Two featured a "progressive fusion of 'Neo Soul' Badu with 'Seasoned and Savvy' Badu together at last". " "Window Seat" was compared to the Badu's early work particularly "On & On" and "Otherside of the Game" from her debut album, "Window Seat" contains stomp-and-clap breakdowns built under halting lyrics.

According to Badu, the album's closing track, "Out My Mind, Just in Time", is a three-movement song: "The first movement is called 'Recovering Undercover Over-lover.' It actually sums up the whole album, because I'm talking about love and emotion – 'I need you to do this,' 'I want you to do this,' 'You make me feel like this,' 'Why don't you feel like this?' It's typical of how you feel in relationships. The second movement is called ... 'Easier Said Than Done,' and it's about how hard it is to change after you've been in a relationship for so long. And then the third movement is called 'But Not This Time,' because even though I've done things a certain way for so long, I won't do that this time". Andy Kellman of AllMusic described the song as being innocently as a piano ballad, before changing into a "psychedelic, slow-motion soul-jazz" song that sees Badu becoming "increasingly fragmentary and tripped-out" before being "renewed."

== Singles ==
The internet-only promotional single "Jump Up in the Air (Stay There)", featuring Lil Wayne and Bilal, was released on Badu's official website in January 2010. RC Williams, Badu's musical director, said that a music video for the track was shot in Dallas. A censored "clean" version of the video was released on February 12, 2010, on Badu's official website. It has been made available as a free, legal download by Giant Step, the marketing and promotion company for the album.

The album's first official single, "Window Seat", was released by Badu through a downloadable link on her Twitter page. The song peaked at number 16 on Billboard R&B/Hip-Hop Songs chart. The video for "Window Seat" was directed by Coodie Rock and premiered on Erykah's official site on March 27, 2010, at 3:33 AM EDT. In the video, Badu is seen walking the streets of Dallas near Dealey Plaza, slowly stripping to the nude, before being shot by an unseen assassin.

The album's second single, "Turn Me Away (Get MuNNY)", was released March 24, 2010 by Badu as a free download online. It spent three weeks on the R&B/Hip-Hop Songs chart, peaking at number 87. On Wednesday, February 9, 2011, vimeo.com released a new video for "Gone Baby, Don't Be Long" directed by Flying Lotus. The video was tweeted by Badu herself and friend and associated music act Questlove.

== Release and promotion ==
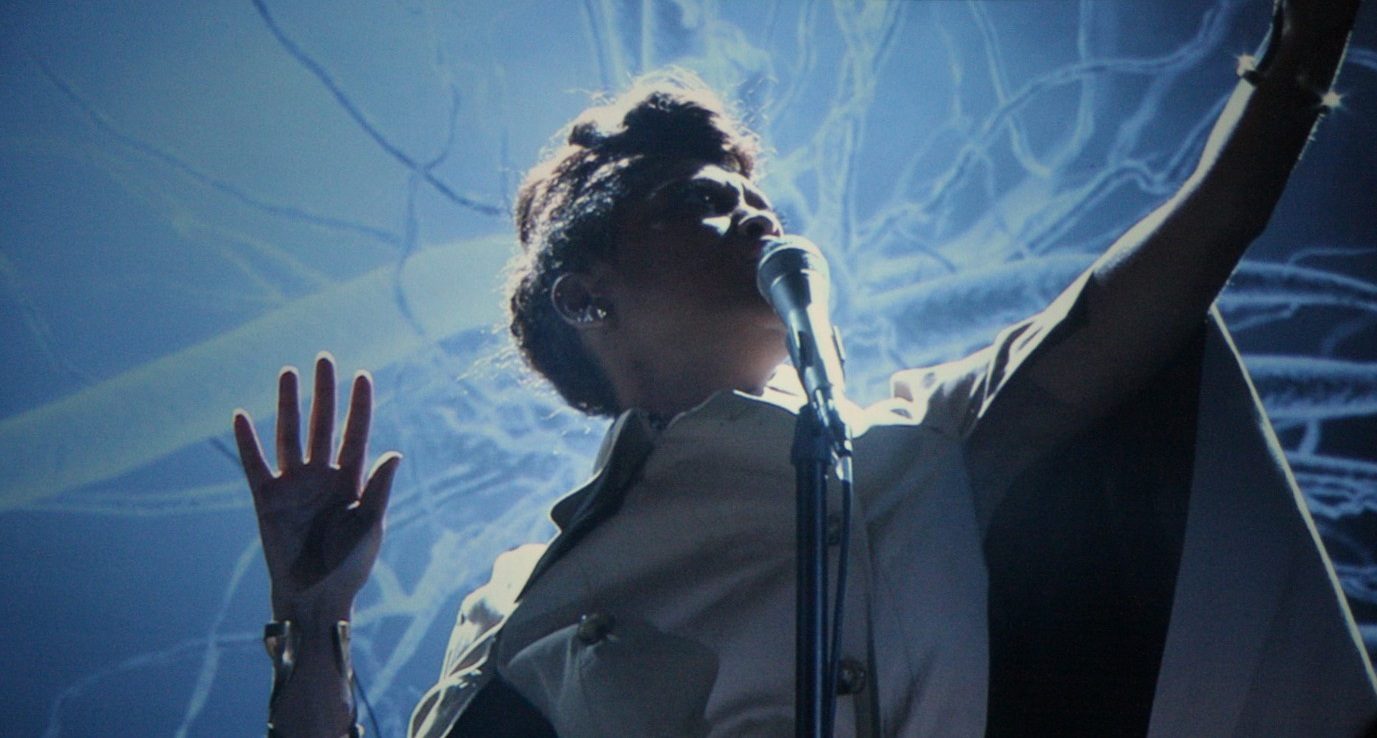
Erykah Badu performing at the Umbria Jazz Festival in 2012

The album was released March 30, 2010 on Universal Motown in the United States, and two weeks later in Japan on April 14, 2010. New Amerykah Part Two's cover art, titled "Out My Mind Just in Time", shares the name of the album's closing track and was designed by visual artist Emek, who had also designed the artwork for New Amerykah Part One. He explained on his website that he used song lyrics from the album as inspiration. In an interview with Billboard, she explained the album's title, stating:

I called it 'Part II: The Return of the Ankh' because this album is the sister of the left side of my brain – it is the right side.' Part I was the left side of my thoughts – it was more socially political and my thought process was more analytical. This time there wasn't anything to be concerned with – the album is more emotional and flowy and talks about feelings. It reminds of the days of 'Baduizm' – this is just about beats and rhymes in a cipher.

— Erykah Badu

In promotion of the album, Erykah Badu hosted a series of listening sessions for press and VIPs at Chung King Studios in New York City on December 9 and December 10, 2009. During March 2010, Badu promoted the album through television performances on Late Night with Jimmy Fallon, The Wendy Williams Show, Chelsea Lately, Jimmy Kimmel Live!, and Good Day New York. She also appeared on the April issue cover of EQ magazine and was featured in the April issues of Nylon and Playboy, while she is also scheduled to appear in upcoming issues of several publications, including Rolling Stone, Entertainment Weekly, Time Out New York, Spin, Vibe, Paste, and People, among many other publications. Badu performed at a surprise midnight show on March 31, 2010, at the El Rey Theatre in Los Angeles.

The album's international supporting tour, "Out My Mind, Just in Time Tour", began its North American-leg on May 28, 2010, starting at the DAR Constitution Hall in Washington, D.C. and ended June 24, 2010 at the Pearl Concert Theater in Las Vegas, Nevada. Its European-leg began July 9, 2010 at Sweden's Hultsfred Festival and ended July 24 at Brixton Academy in London, England. Badu was supported on the tour by N.E.R.D., Bilal, Janelle Monáe and The Roots-drummer Ahmir "Questlove" Thompson. She also performed at the Lollapalooza festival and Lilith Fair during the 2010 summer, along with special guest appearances at Maxwell's concerts at Philips Arena in Atlanta, Georgia on June 11 and at Madison Square Garden in New York City on June 26, 2010.

== Commercial performance ==
The album debuted at number four on the US Billboard 200 chart, selling 110,000 copies in its first week. It also entered at number two on Billboard's R&B/Hip-Hop Albums chart. In its second week, the album fell to number nine on the Billboard 200, selling an additional 30,000 copies. The album fell to number 20 and sold 19,000 copies in its third week. As of 2011 it has sold around 300,000 copies in United States according to Nielsen SoundScan. In the United Kingdom, New Amerykah Part Two (Return of the Ankh) debuted at number 56 on the UK Albums Chart and at number nine on the R&B Albums Chart. New Amerykah Part Two achieved moderate chart success in international markets, peaking within the top-50 in several countries, including Norway, Poland, Switzerland, Sweden, and Denmark.

== Critical reception ==
Professional ratings
Aggregate scores
Source	Rating
AnyDecentMusic?	7.4/10
Metacritic	83/100
Review scores
Source	Rating
AllMusic	4/5 stars
The A.V. Club	A−
Entertainment Weekly	A−
The Guardian	4/5 stars
The Independent	4/5 stars
NME	8/10
Pitchfork	8.0/10
Rolling Stone	3/5 stars
Spin	8/10
USA Today	3.5/4 stars

New Amerykah Part Two received widespread acclaim from critics. At Metacritic, which assigns a normalized rating out of 100 to reviews from mainstream publications, the album received an average score of 83, based on 25 reviews. Most critics found its loose, soulful music inventive and more accessible than its predecessor. AllMusic editor Andy Kellman said "the album is so rich with sample-reliant songs that it sometimes resembles a glorified mixtape". The A.V. Club's Michaelangelo Matos found the record "smoother than anything since her 1997 debut, Baduizm". Eric Henderson from Slant Magazine praised the record's "freeform" style and compared Badu's songwriting approach to that of Marvin Gaye, who "would usually feel out his melodies first and then come up with lyrics to fit into those lines. The result for both Gaye and Badu is R&B impressionism". Pitchfork's Mike Powell called the album "a coherent expression of a big, scattered personality" and praised Badu's expressive performance, writing that "her ability to toe the line between sounding effortless and sounding tossed-off is remarkable". In The Guardian, Alexis Petridis argued that repeated listens revealed a number of gratifying eccentric musical and lyrical details.

Some critics, however, found Badu's songwriting overly vague and deemed New Amerykah Part Two less adventurous than its predecessor. Kellman said it was "more personal than planetary, less challenging sonically and lyrically". In The New York Times, Jon Pareles felt the music's "atmosphere easily upstages the words", while Rolling Stone magazine's Jody Rosen found its "hazy texture" and songwriting sketchy. Kitty Empire from The Observer wrote that it "turns its skewed sights on love in both soppy and calculating fashion". Robert Christgau gave it an "honorable mention" in his consumer guide for MSN Music, citing "Turn Me Away (Get Munny)" and "Gone Baby, Don't Be Long" as highlights and writing "love may be a groove, but that doesn't make a groove a love song".

At the end of 2010, New Amerykah Part Two was named one of the year's best albums in a number of critics' lists, including Pitchfork, who ranked it 18th, and later named it one of "The 100 Best Albums of the Decade So Far" in August 2014. In the annual Pazz & Jop critics poll, it was voted 23rd best.

== Track listing ==
No.	Title	Writer(s)	Producer(s)	Length
1.	"20 Feet Tall"	Erykah Badu; Patrick Douthit; Douglas Wimbish	Badu; 9th Wonder; Poyser	3:25
2.	"Window Seat"	Badu; Poyser	Badu; Poyser	4:50
3.	"Agitation"	Badu; Shafiq Husayn; David Sancious	Badu; Husayn	1:33
4.	"Turn Me Away (Get MuNNY)"	Badu; Roy Ayers; Sylvia Striplin; James Bedford, Jr.	Badu	5:26
5.	"Gone Baby, Don't Be Long"	Badu; Husayn; Terrell "Ta'Raach" McMathis; Paul McCartney	Ta'Raach; Badu	4:39
6.	"Umm Hmm"	Badu; Otis Jackson, Jr.; Leon "Ndugu" Chancler	Madlib; Badu	3:45
7.	"Love"	Badu; James Yancey; Ira Raibon	J Dilla; Badu; Mike Chav	6:02
8.	"You Loving Me (Session)"	Badu; Waldo Benzworth; Jonathan Cantero; R.C. Williams	Badu	1:04
9.	"Fall in Love (Your Funeral)"	Badu; Karriem Riggins; Garry Glenn; Eddie Kendricks	Riggins	6:06
10.	"Incense" (featuring Kirsten Agresta)	Badu; Jackson, Jr.	Madlib	3:27
11.	"Out My Mind, Just in Time"	Badu; Georgia Anne Muldrow; Poyser	Badu; Muldrow	10:21
Total length:				50:35

iTunes bonus track
No.	Title	Writer(s)	Producer	Length
12.	"Jump Up in the Air (Stay There)" (featuring Lil Wayne and Bilal)	Badu; Dwayne Carter, Jr.; Bilal Oliver	Badu; Williams; Jahborn	4:25

Japanese edition bonus track
No.	Title	Writer(s)	Producer(s)	Length
12.	"Telephone" (Remix)	Badu; Poyser; Ahmir Thompson	Badu; Poyser; Thompson	10:22
Total length:				60:58

== Personnel ==
Credits for New Amerykah Part Two (Return of the Ankh) adapted from liner notes.

#	Title	Notes
	New Amerykah Part Two (Return of the Ankh)	Recording engineers: Mike "Chav" Chavaria (tracks 3–6, 9–11), Chris Bell (2, 5, 8), Tom Soares (2), Shafiq Husayn (3), Brian Vibberts/Buck Snow (band on 4), Erykah Badu (7); Mixing: Tom Soares, exc. track 7 mixed by Chris Bell; Executive production: Erykah Badu, Mike Chavaria; Design concept: Erykah Badu; Art direction/design: Erykah Badu, Kyledidthis; Illustrations: EMEK Studios (Emek & Gan); Typography inspiration: Alfredo Gray; Project management and marketing: Paul Levatino (for Badu World), Xavier Jernigan (for Universal Motown); A&R: Edward Richardson (Universal Motown)
1	"20 Feet Tall"	Produced by Erykah Badu, 9th Wonder (original track), James Poyser ("acoustic interpolation"); Lyrics written by Erykah Badu; Erykah Badu (vocals sung by), James Poyser (keyboards), Mike Chavaria (synthesizer); Embodies portions of "My Darling Baby" by Wood Brass & Steel
2	"Window Seat"	Produced by Erykah Badu and James Poyser; Song arrangement & Lyrics written by Erykah Badu; Erykah Badu (vocals, handclaps, stomps), James Poyser (Rhodes and all pianos), Mike Chavaria (synthesizer, cajón, handclaps, stomps), Alfredo Gray (handclaps, stomps), Kirsten Agresta (harp), Stephen "Thundercat" Bruner (bass), Questlove (drums)
3	"Agitation"	Produced by Erykah Badu and Shafiq Husayn of Sa-Ra Creative Partners; Erykah Badu (all vocals), Mike Chavaria (additional programming); Contains a sample of "Just as I Thought" by David Sancious
4	"Turn Me Away (Get MuNNY)"	Produced by Erykah Badu; Additional Lyrics written by Erykah Badu; Erykah Badu (handclaps), Karriem Riggins (drums, handclaps), Stephen "Thundercat" Bruner (bass, handclaps), James Poyser (keyboards, handclaps), Tommy Trajlio (guitar, handclaps), Questlove (handclaps), Mike Chavaria (synthesizer, additional programming); Contains an interpolation of "You Can't Turn Me Away" by Sylvia Striplin
5	"Gone Baby, Don't Be Long"	Produced by Ta'Raach and Erykah Badu; Lyrics Written by Erykah Badu & Shafiq Husayn; Jeff Lee Johnson (guitar), Ta'Raach and Mike Chavaria (programming); Contains a sample of "Arrow Through Me" by Paul McCartney and Wings
6	"Umm Hmm"	Produced by Madlib and Erykah Badu; Erykah Badu (lead & additional backing vocals, cabasa, additional percussion), Madlib (programming), James Poyser (keyboards, additional programming), Stephen "Thundercat" Bruner (bass); Contains a sample of "Take Some Time" by Ndugu & The Chocolate Jam Co.
7	"Love"	Produced by J Dilla, Erykah Badu and Mike Chavaria; Arranged by Erykah Badu and Mike Chavaria; Intro created by Mike Chavaria; Lyrics Written by Erykah Badu; Erykah Badu (vocals sung by), Mike Chavaria (synthesizer), Pilar Cote (intro voices); Contains a portion of "Take Me" by Fabulous Souls
8	"You Loving Me (Session)"	Produced by Erykah Badu; Lyrics written by Erykah Badu & Waldo D. Benzworth; Erykah Badu (vocals sung by), RC Williams (keyboards), Jah Born (MP2000 programming)
9	"Fall in Love (Your Funeral)"	Produced by Karriem Riggins; Additional Lyrics written by Erykah Badu; Erykah Badu (all vocals, all percussion), Mike Chavaria (synthesizer, additional programming); Contains a sample of "Intimate Friends" by Eddie Kendricks
10	"Incense"	Produced by Madlib; Arranged by Erykah Badu and Mike Chavaria; Kirsten Agresta (harp), Erykah Badu (vocals sung by), Mike Chavaria (synthesizer)
11	"Out My Mind, Just in Time"	Part 1: Produced by Erykah Badu; Lyrics inspired by Suheir Muhammad's poem "What I Will"; Erykah Badu (all vocals), James Poyser (grand piano), Mike Chavaria (chopped & screwed editing); Part 2 & 3: Produced by Erykah Badu and Georgia Anne Muldrow; Lyrics written by Erykah Badu; Erykah Badu (additional programming on part 2 only, vocals), Georgia Anne Muldrow (keyboards, bass, drums)
*	"Jump Up in the Air (Stay There)"	Produced by Erykah Badu, RC Williams and Jahborn; Lil Wayne (rap), Bilal (vocals); Contains an interpolation of "Hydraulic Pump" by The P-Funk All-Stars

== Charts ==
=== Weekly charts ===
Chart (2010)	Peak position
Australian Albums (ARIA)	127
Austrian Albums (Ö3 Austria)	38
Belgian Albums (Ultratop Flanders)	53
Danish Albums (Hitlisten)	35
Dutch Albums (Album Top 100)	66
French Albums (SNEP)	77
German Albums (Offizielle Top 100)	61
Italian Albums (FIMI)	52
Japanese Albums (Oricon)	38
Norwegian Albums (VG-lista)	14
Polish Albums (ZPAV)	15
Swedish Albums (Sverigetopplistan)	21
Swiss Albums (Schweizer Hitparade)	18
UK Albums (Official Charts)	56
UK R&B Albums (Official Charts)	9
US Billboard 200	4
US Top R&B/Hip-Hop Albums (Billboard)	2

=== Year-end charts ===
Chart (2010)	Position
US Billboard 200	119
US Top R&B/Hip-Hop Albums (Billboard)	32

== See also ==
- Sampling
- Hip hop production
