= Seeds (Georgia Anne Muldrow album) =

Studio album by Georgia Anne Muldrow
- Released: March 27, 2012
- Genres: R&B; soul; funk
- Length: 34:13
- Label: SomeOthaShip Connect
- Producer: Madlib

Georgia Anne Muldrow chronology
Owed to Mama Rickie (2011)	Seeds (2012)	Denderah (2013)

Singles from Seeds
- 1. "Seeds" Released: February 14, 2012

Seeds is a solo studio album by American singer Georgia Anne Muldrow. It was released via SomeOthaShip Connect on March 27, 2012. The album is entirely produced by Madlib.

The single of the same name was released on February 14, 2012.

== Critical reception ==
Professional ratings
Aggregate scores
Source	Rating
Metacritic	79/100
Review scores
Source	Rating
AllMusic	4/5 stars
Consequence of Sound	C+
Exclaim!	favorable
Pitchfork	7.9/10
PopMatters	7/10 stars
Spin	7/10

At Metacritic, which assigns a weighted average score out of 100 to reviews from mainstream critics, the album received an average score of 79, based on 11 reviews, indicating "generally favorable reviews".

Andy Kellman of AllMusic gave the album 4 out of 5 stars, calling it "Muldrow's most focused, funkiest, and (somewhat ironically) personal release to date." Matt Bauer of Exclaim! said, "Seeds strikes the perfect balance, as Madlib's thickly layered funk and soul samples and cabinet rocking beats pair with Muldrow's gloriously off-kilter vocals and free-form song structures to make this her most satisfying release to date."

AllMusic included it on the "Favorite R&B Albums of 2012" list. Exclaim! placed it at number 31 on the "Top 50 Albums of the Year" list. Rhapsody placed it at number 7 on the "Top 20 R&B Albums of 2012" list.

== Track listing ==
No.	Title	Length
1.	"Seeds"	4:55
2.	"Wind"	2:09
3.	"Calabash"	3:07
4.	"Kali Yuga"	3:33
5.	"The Birth of Petey Wheatstraw"	4:39
6.	"Best Love"	4:22
7.	"Husfriend Intro"	1:54
8.	"Husfriend"	3:05
9.	"Kneecap Jelly"	2:37
10.	"The Few"	2:39
11.	"Remember (Outro)"	1:13
Total length:		34:13

== Personnel ==
Credits adapted from liner notes.

- Georgia Anne Muldrow – vocals
- Madlib – production
- Declaime – vocals (10), executive production
- Rickie Byars Beckwith – executive production
- Jay Devonish – executive production
- DJ Romes – mastering
- Charles Sicuso – photography
