= Give Me Your Love (Sylvia Striplin album) =

Studio album by Sylvia Striplin
- Released: May 5, 1981
- Recorded: 1980–1981
- Studios: Artisan Sound, Hollywood, California; Electric Lady, New York City; Sigma Sound, New York City
- Genres: Funk; soul; R&B
- Length: 41:53
- Label: Uno Melodic
- Producers: Roy Ayers; James Bedford

Give Me Your Love is the 1981 debut and only released album of singer Sylvia Striplin.

== Reception ==
Professional ratings
Review scores
Source	Rating
AllMusic	4/5 stars

Released on Roy Ayers's Uno Melodic record label in 1981. While it didn't make a dent on the R&B charts, over time it has eventually become "a rare groove favorite", as Andy Kellman from AllMusic puts it. Several songs have been since sampled:

- "You Can't Turn Me Away" was sampled by The Notorious B.I.G. mentored group, Junior M.A.F.I.A. on their song "Get Money" in 1995.
- "Give Me Your Love" was sampled by Armand van Helden in "Full Moon" (2000), The Madd Rapper in "That's What's Happening" (1999), Tonéx in "'Bout a Thang" (2002). The bassline from this song was sampled in the song The Love Bug recorded by M-Flo in 2004.

== Track listing ==
1. "Look Towards The Sky" - (Sylvia Striplin) 4:34
2. "Toy Box" - (Jaymz Bedford) 4:16
3. "You Can't Turn Me Away" - (Roy Ayers, Sylvia Striplin, Jaymz Bedford) 5:31
4. "All Alone" - (Luther Wilson, Tanya Woods) 5:12
5. "Give Me Your Love" - (Jaymz Bedford) 6:20
6. "Will We Ever Pass This Way Again" - (Luther Wilson, Tanya Woods) 4:37
7. "Searchin'" - (Roy Ayers) 6:29
8. "You Said" - (Sylvia Striplin, Roy Ayers) 4:54

== Personnel ==
- Sylvia Striplin - lead and backing vocals, handclaps
- Nathan Lamar Watts, Peter Brown, William Allen - bass
- Rick Zunigar, Jef Lee Johnson, Chuck Anthony, Randy Russell Pigeé - guitar
- Steve Cobb, Dennis Davis, Omar-Ibn-Hakim - drums
- Philip Woo - Oberheim synthesizer
- Mudbone - electric piano
- Justo Almario - soprano saxophone
- James "Jaymz" Bedford - Clavinet
- William Allen - string arrangements
