= Black Love and War =

Studio album by G&D (Georgia Anne Muldrow and Dudley Perkins)
- Released: August 9, 2019
- Genre: Hip-hop
- Label: SomeOthaShip; eOne
- Producer: Georgia Anne Muldrow; Mike & Keys; Oh No

G&D chronology
The Lighthouse (2003)	Black Love and War (2019)

Georgia Anne Muldrow chronology
VWETO II (2019)	Black Love and War (2019)	Mama, You Can Bet! (2020)

Dudley Perkins chronology
Young Spirit (2017)	Black Love and War (2019)	In the Beginning, Vol. 1 (2021)

Black Love and War is the fifth collaborative studio album by American musicians Georgia Anne Muldrow and Dudley Perkins. It was released on August 9, 2019, through SomeOthaShip Connect and Entertainment One. Production was handled by Georgia Anne Muldrow, Oh No and the Futuristiks. It features guest appearances from LaToiya Williams, Aloe Blacc, Ms. Dezy and Sean Biggs.

== Critical reception ==
Professional ratings
Aggregate scores
Source	Rating
Metacritic	79/100
Review scores
Source	Rating
AllMusic	4/5 stars
Exclaim!	8/10
Pitchfork	7.5/10
PopMatters	7/10
The Irish Times	4/5 stars

Black Love and War was met with generally favorable reviews from music critics. At Metacritic, which assigns a normalized rating out of 100 to reviews from mainstream publications, the album received an average score of 79 based on four reviews.

AllMusic's Andy Kellman praised the album, stating: "on Black Love & War, they channel love for one another and their people, vexation in the face of escalating tyranny, and seemingly inextinguishable positivity into some of their most determined and stimulating funk". Matt Bauer of Exclaim! wrote: "the couple's adoration for each other is every bit as potent as their social consciousness, on "P.A.L" and "Fruitful", two of the cosmic quiet storm cuts that comprise the album's second half. And when Aloe Blacc drops by on "Smile", something's seriously amiss if your body doesn't move". Shannon J. Effinger of Pitchfork found "Muldrow and Perkins root their work in the present by paying homage to the sound and radical spirit of their West Coast home". Rich Wilhelm of PopMatters resumed: "the album hits universal chords while specifically chronicling both the struggles and rewards of existing as an African American family in the 21st-century United States".

== Track listing ==
No.	Title	Producer(s)	Length
1.	"English Breakfast"		1:10
2.	"Where I'm From"	Mike & Keys	3:52
3.	"Peace Peace"	Georgia Anne Muldrow	3:05
4.	"That's How"	Georgia Anne Muldrow	2:47
5.	"The Power of Your Brain"	Georgia Anne Muldrow	1:21
6.	"The Battle"	Georgia Anne Muldrow	2:49
7.	"Slave Revolt"	Georgia Anne Muldrow	1:43
8.	"Protect Yourself"	Oh No	4:03
9.	"So Pretti"	Oh No	3:27
10.	"187"	Georgia Anne Muldrow	1:08
11.	"Again" (featuring LaToiya Williams)	Georgia Anne Muldrow	3:54
12.	"Jacob's Ladder"	Georgia Anne Muldrow	4:08
13.	"P.A.L."	Georgia Anne Muldrow	3:08
14.	"Smile" (featuring Ms. Dezy, Aloe Blacc and LaToiya Williams)	Georgia Anne Muldrow	4:11
15.	"Fruitful" (featuring Sean Biggs)	Georgia Anne Muldrow	4:31
16.	"Big Mel"	Georgia Anne Muldrow	2:55
