= Overload (Georgia Anne Muldrow album) =

Studio album by Georgia Anne Muldrow
- Released: October 26, 2018
- Genres: R&B, pop
- Length: 36:49
- Label: Brainfeeder

Georgia Anne Muldrow chronology
A Thoughtiverse Unmarred (2015)	Overload (2018)	Vweto II (2019)

Professional ratings
Aggregate scores
Source	Rating
Metacritic	80/100
Review scores
Source	Rating
AllMusic	4/5 stars
Exclaim!	8/10
Loud and Quiet	7/10
MusicOMH	4/5 stars
Pitchfork	8/10
Resident Advisor	4/5 stars

Overload is a studio album by American musician Georgia Anne Muldrow. It was released on October 26, 2018, by Brainfeeder. Overload received a nomination for Best Urban Contemporary Album at the 62nd Grammy Awards.

== Release ==
On September 13, 2018, Muldrow announced the release of her new studio album, along with the single "Aerosol".

== Critical reception ==
Overload was met with "generally favorable" reviews from critics. At Metacritic, which assigns a weighted average rating out of 100 to reviews from mainstream publications, this release received an average score of 80 based on 10 reviews. Aggregator Album of the Year gave the release a 77 out of 100 based on a critical consensus of 9 reviews.

=== Accolades ===
Publication	Accolade	Rank	Ref.
The A.V. Club	Top 20 Albums of 2018	16	
Bandcamp	Top 100 Albums of 2018	32	
Pitchfork	Top 50 Albums of 2018	49	

== Track listing ==
No.	Title	Length
1.	"I.O.T.A. (Instrument of the Ancestors)"	1:09
2.	"Play It Up"	3:47
3.	"Overload"	3:58
4.	"Blam"	2:47
5.	"Williehook (Skit)"	0:54
6.	"Aerosol"	2:01
7.	"Vital Transformation"	4:28
8.	"You Can Always Count on Me"	3:05
9.	"These Are the Things I Really Like About You"	2:15
10.	"Canadian Hillbilly"	4:21
11.	"Conmigo (Reprise)"	2:37
12.	"Bobbie's Dittie"	4:28
13.	"Ciao"	0:59

== Personnel ==
Technical personnel

- Georgia Anne Muldrow – producer
- Mike & Keys – producer
- Moods – producer
- Lustbass – producer
- Flying Lotus – executive producer
- Aloe Blacc – executive producer
- Dudley Perkins – executive producer
- Daddy Kev – mastering

Artwork

- Martin Norwood – cover art
- Adam Stover – layout, design
