= Honey (Erykah Badu song) =

Single by Erykah Badu

from the album New Amerykah Part One (4th World War)
- B-side: "Bag Lady"
- Released: November 20, 2007
- Recorded: 2007
- Studio: Luminous Sound Recording (Dallas, TX)
- Genre: R&B
- Length: 5:21 (album version); 4:37 (radio edit)
- Label: Universal Motown
- Songwriters: Erykah Badu; Patrick Douthit; Fritz Baskett; Clarence McDonald; David Shields
- Producer: 9th Wonder

Erykah Badu singles chronology
"The Heart Gently Weeps" (2007)	"Honey" (2007)	"Soldier" (2008)

"Honey" is a song recorded by American singer Erykah Badu for her fourth studio album New Amerykah Part One (4th World War) (2008). It was produced by 9th Wonder, and contains a sample from Nancy Wilson's 1978 song "I'm in Love". The song was released as the lead single from New Amerykah Part One (4th World War) on November 20, 2007, by Universal Motown Records.

== Music video ==
Directed by Badu and Chris Robinson, the song's music video was released on January 28, 2008, and was conceived by Badu as an homage to classic records. Set in a small business record store, it follows a customer looking through vintage R&B, hip hop, and rock LP albums, with the albums' cover artwork depicted as moving images with Badu cast in them. According to Robinson, "We wanted a video that spoke to Badu's eclecticism. Those album covers represent all the influences that she embodies." Albums covers that were recreated in the video are those of:

- Rufus featuring Chaka Khan (1975) by Rufus
- Blue (2006) by Diana Ross
- Maggot Brain (1971) by Funkadelic
- Paid in Full (1987) by Eric B. & Rakim
- Honey (1975) by Ohio Players
- Perfect Angel (1975) by Minnie Riperton
- Chameleon (1976) by Labelle
- 3 Feet High and Rising (1989) by De La Soul
- Let It Be (1970) by The Beatles
- Illmatic (1994) by Nas
- Physical (1981) by Olivia Newton-John
- Nightclubbing (1981) by Grace Jones
- Head to the Sky (1973) by Earth, Wind & Fire

As a video within a video, the record store's video screen plays an excerpt of the song "Annie" performed by Badu's side project Edith Funker, which features Questlove, James Poyser, Nikka Costa, Mike Elizondo, and Wendy Melvoin. The video also features a cameo appearance by Sa-Ra members Shafiq Husayn and Taz Arnold. The video also features a recreated version of Rolling Stone magazine's front cover for its January 1981 issue, which originally featured John Lennon and Yoko Ono.

In the video, Badu also spoofs ex-boyfriend André 3000 in OutKast's 2003 music video "Hey Ya!", changing the green setting for a pink one. The album cover is influenced in layout and proportions by the artwork from the 1976 self-titled debut album of the band Boston. The artwork for the album Boston can be seen on the record store wall just below and to the left of the artwork for Honey in the last seconds of the video.

=== Accolades ===
The video for "Honey" won Best Direction at the 2008 MTV Video Music Awards, and was nominated for Best Special Effects, Best Editing, and Best Cinematography. Badu also received the Video Director of the Year award at the 2008 BET Awards for the video.

The video was also nominated for Best Short Form Music Video at the 51st Grammy Awards.

It appeared at number seventy-nine on BET's Notarized: Top 100 Videos of 2008.

In 2011, Complex magazine named it the 29th best music video of the 2000s.

== Charts ==
=== Weekly charts ===
Weekly chart performance for "Honey"
Chart (2007–2008)	Peak position
Japan (Japan Hot 100)	35
US Billboard Hot 100	88
US Hot R&B/Hip-Hop Songs (Billboard)	22

=== Year-end charts ===
Year-end chart performance for "Honey"
Chart (2008)	Position
US Hot R&B/Hip-Hop Songs (Billboard)	67

== Release history ==
Release dates and formats for "Honey"
Region	Date	Format(s)	Label(s)	Ref.
United States	November 20, 2007	Rhythmic contemporary radio	Universal Motown	
United States	December 18, 2007	12-inch vinyl	Universal Motown	
