= Nuclear Evolution: The Age of Love =

Studio album by Sa-Ra Creative Partners
- Released: June 23, 2009
- Genre: Hip hop
- Length: 92:25
- Label: Ubiquity
- Producer: Sa-Ra Creative Partners

Sa-Ra Creative Partners chronology
The Hollywood Recordings (2007)	Nuclear Evolution: The Age of Love (2009)

Nuclear Evolution: The Age of Love is the second studio album by American hip hop group Sa-Ra Creative Partners. It was released via Ubiquity Records on June 23, 2009. The Wire listed it as one of the "Top 50 Releases of the Year".

== Release and reception ==
Professional ratings
Review scores
Source	Rating
AllMusic	4/5 stars
Fact	8/10
HipHopDX	4.0/5
PopMatters	6/10 stars
The Skinny	4/5 stars
Spin	favorable
XLR8R	8/10

== Track listing ==
Disc 1
No.	Title	Length
1.	"Spacefruit" (featuring Debi Nova)	5:03
2.	"Dirty Beauty" (featuring Erykah Badu)	3:21
3.	"I Swear" (featuring Noni Limar)	3:30
4.	"Melodee N'mynor"	3:15
5.	"He Say She Say"	3:22
6.	"Traffika"	3:43
7.	"Souls Brother"	2:01
8.	"Bitch Baby"	4:04
9.	"Love Czars"	7:48
10.	"Gemini's Rising" (featuring Rozzi Daime)	6:18
11.	"The Bone Song"	3:47
12.	"White Cloud" (featuring Rozzi Daime and Lil’ Kenny)	3:42
13.	"Move Your Ass"	4:01
14.	"Love Today"	3:27
15.	"Can I Get U Hi?"	3:02
16.	"My Star" (featuring Erika Rose)	3:49
17.	"Cosmic Ball" (featuring The Gary Bartz Quartet)	7:32
Total length:		71:56

Disc 2
No.	Title	Length
1.	"Spaceways Theme"	2:27
2.	"Just like a Baby"	5:01
3.	"Double Dutch (Co Co Pops)"	3:39
4.	"Death of a Star (Supernova)"	3:54
5.	"Powder Bump"	3:15
6.	"Hangin' by a String"	2:22
Total length:		20:39
