= Turn Me Away (Get MuNNY) =

Single by Erykah Badu

from the album New Amerykah Part Two (Return of the Ankh)
- Released: March 24, 2010
- Studio: Mad Hatter Studios (Los Angeles, CA); The Kitchen (Dallas, TX)
- Genre: R&B; funk
- Length: 5:26
- Label: Universal Motown
- Songwriter(s): Erykah Badu, Roy Ayers; Sylvia Striplin, James Bedford Jr.
- Producer(s): Erykah Badu, Karriem Riggins

Erykah Badu singles chronology
"Window Seat" (2010)	"Turn Me Away (Get MuNNY)" (2010)	"Gone Baby, Don't Be Long" (2010)

"Turn Me Away (Get MuNNY)" is a song by R&B singer Erykah Badu, also the second single from her album New Amerykah Part Two (Return of the Ankh). It was produced by Badu and Karriem Riggins, and is a semi-remake of the song "You Can't Turn Me Away", by Sylvia Striplin. The song also contains lyrics from "Get Money", as performed by Junior Mafia and The Notorious B.I.G.

== Chart history ==
Chart (2010)	Peak position
Japan (Japan Hot 100)	65
US Hot R&B/Hip-Hop Songs (Billboard)	87
