= RAMP (American band) =

American soul/jazz band

- Also known as: R.A.M.P.; Ramp
- Origin: Cincinnati, Ohio, U.S.
- Genres: Soul; jazz-funk
- Years active: 1976–1977, 2006–2007
- Label: ABC Blue Thumb
- Past members: Sharon Matthews; Sibel Thrasher (deceased); Landy Shores; Nate White (deceased); John Manuel

RAMP (an acronym for Roy Ayers Music Productions) was an American soul/jazz band from Cincinnati, Ohio. It was founded in 1976 by Roy Ayers, who was not a member of the group, though he did write and produce songs on their only album. The band consisted of Sharon Matthews and Sibel Thrasher on vocals, Landy Shores on guitar, Nate White on bass, and John Manuel on drums and percussion. The band is joined in the present day by Kia Bennett and Desiree Jordan.

The group released one studio album, Come into Knowledge, subsequently considered a classic among rare-groove collectors, artists (such as Erykah Badu, Mary J. Blige, Common, PM Dawn, Tyler the Creator, A Tribe Called Quest and many others who have used RAMP samples in their music) and Roy Ayers fans.

Come into Knowledge was recorded at Electric Lady Studios in New York City and at Record Plant in Hollywood, California. The group was a vehicle for the songwriting talents of Ayers and Edwin Birdsong. Released in 1977 via ABC Blue Thumb, the set featured a version of Ayers' "Everybody Loves the Sunshine" along with the 'rare groove' track "Daylight". The LP record release of the album commands very high prices. The album was eventually reissued and re-released on CD in 2007 by P-Vine Records in Japan and by Verve Records in Europe and the United States.

The group split up shortly afterwards, but reformed in 2006 for new tours and recordings. RAMP performed on June 30, 2007, with Washington, D.C. jazz pianist Will Rast, at the Central Park SummerStage in New York City. RAMP member Sibel Thrasher died in April 2020. RAMP bassist Nate White died in January 2021.

In 2008, the song "Daylight" was featured in Grand Theft Auto IV on the fictional radio station The Vibe 98.8.

== Members ==
- Sharon Matthews – vocals
- Sibel Thrasher – vocals
- Landy Shores – guitar
- Nate White – bass
- Johnny Manuel – drums and percussion

== Discography ==
Come into Knowledge

Studio album by RAMP
- Released: 1977
- Studio: Electric Lady Studios (New York City); Record Plant (Hollywood, CA)
- Genre: Soul; jazz-funk
- Length: 41:48
- Label: ABC Blue Thumb; P-Vine (reissue); Verve (reissue)
- Producer: Roy Ayers; William Allen (co.); Edwin Birdsong (co.)

Singles from Come into Knowledge
- 1. "Everybody Loves the Sunshine" Released: 1977

=== Come into Knowledge ===
No.	Title	Writer(s)	Length
1.	"The American Promise"	Roy Ayers; Edwin Birdsong	6:18
2.	"I Just Love You"	Roy Ayers	4:56
3.	"Give It"	Edwin Birdsong	4:42
4.	"Everybody Loves the Sunshine"	Roy Ayers	3:43
5.	"Come into Knowledge"	Roy Ayers; William Allen; Philip Woo	4:37
6.	"Try, Try, Try"	Roy Ayers	4:57
7.	"Daylight"	Roy Ayers; William Allen; Edwin Birdsong	4:12
8.	"Look into the Sky"	Roy Ayers	4:42
9.	"Deep Velvet"	Roy Ayers	3:39
Total length:			41:48
