= Kirsten Agresta =

American harpist

Kirsten Agresta Copely is an American harpist and composer based in New York City. She has been nominated twice for a GRAMMY award and is the first female solo harpist to receive a nomination in the Best New Age, Ambient, or Chant category for her albums Aquamarine and Kuruvinda.

Agresta Copely is a former associate professor of harp at Vanderbilt University and affiliated artist on the music faculty of Sarah Lawrence College, a board member of the World Harp Congress, and a member of NARAS and ASCAP. She has collaborated with many artists across a wide range of genres, including Jay-Z, Beyoncé Knowles, Enya, Sting, Kanye West, Alicia Keys, The Mavericks, Evanescence, The Who, Carrie Underwood, Tony Bennett and Kristin Chenoweth.

Agresta Copely performed for former U.S. President Barack Obama at his second official White House State Dinner, and has also performed for Queen Margrethe II of Denmark, Queen Silvia of Sweden, Queen Rania Al-Abdullah of Jordan, UN Secretary General Kofi Annan, and former U.S. Vice President Al Gore.

== Career ==
Agresta Copely received her bachelor's and master's of music degrees from Indiana University Bloomington in harp performance.

After winning the bronze medal in the 1989 USA International Harp Competition, Agresta Copely began performing as a solo artist, traveling across the United States, Europe, South America, Israel, Japan, and the South Pacific. Her success culminated in three Carnegie Hall solo recitals from 1998 to 2002 and two recitals at the Lincoln Center.

Her debut album, Dream World was released in August 2001. The Covers Album was released on all streaming platforms in May 2019. The new-age album Around The Sun released January, 2020, marking her first as composer and winning a silver medal at the Global Music Awards.

Agresta Copely's 2025 album Kuruvinda and 2023 album, Aquamarine, were both nominated for Best New Age, Ambient, or Chant Album in the 68th Annual Grammy Awards and 66th Annual Grammy Awards.

== Discography ==
- Dream World 2001
- The Covers Album 2019
- Around The Sun 2020
- Aquamarine 2023
- Kuruvinda 2025

Her music also appears on several television and movie soundtracks, including Outlander Season 3, Night at the Museum 2 , Sex and the City 2, Rebel in the Rye , My Little Pony: The Movie, and The Tempest.
