= Soldier (Erykah Badu song) =

Single by Erykah Badu

from the album New Amerykah Part One (4th World War)
- Released: 2008
- Recorded: 2007
- Studio: Electric Lady Studios (New York, NY); Luminous Sound Recording (Dallas, TX)
- Genre: R&B
- Length: 5:04 (album version)
- Label: Universal Motown, Control Freaq
- Songwriter(s): Erykah Badu, Karriem Riggins, T. Barlage, W. Ennes, H. Waterman, G. Willemse
- Producer(s): Karriem Riggins

Erykah Badu singles chronology
"Honey" (2007)	"Soldier" (2008)	"Window Seat" (2010)

"Soldier" is a song by Erykah Badu released as the second single from her fifth album, New Amerykah Part One (4th World War). The song was produced by Karriem Riggins. This was strictly a promotional single and did not have a commercial single release or music video. It prominently uses a melodic sample from the song "Theme" by Solution, a Dutch progressive rock band, along with a drum break from the song "Upon This Rock" by American saxophonist Joe Farrell.

"Soldier" was chosen in a poll after Badu asked Okayplayer users to vote on the next single to be released from New Amerykah.

== Charts ==
Chart (2008)	Peak position
U.S. Billboard Adult R&B Airplay	31
U.S. Billboard Bubbling Under R&B/Hip-Hop Singles	12
