= Window Seat (song) =

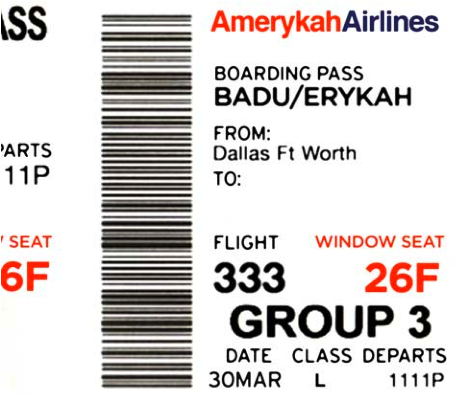

Single by Erykah Badu

from the album New Amerykah Part Two (Return of the Ankh)
- Released: February 5, 2010
- Recorded: 2009
- Studio: Luminous Sound (Dallas, TX)
- Genre: R&B
- Length: 4:50
- Label: Universal Motown
- Songwriters: Erykah Badu, James Poyser
- Producers: Erykah Badu, James Poyser

Erykah Badu singles chronology
"The Healer" (2008)	"Window Seat" (2010)	"Turn Me Away (Get MuNNY)" (2010)

"Window Seat" is a song by Erykah Badu. It is the lead single from her album New Amerykah Part Two (Return of the Ankh) (2010). It was produced by Badu and James Poyser. The song is low-tempo ballad with lyrics that concern escapism and longing for a lover. The music video for "Window Seat" features Badu walking the streets around Dealey Plaza in Dallas, Texas, slowly stripping to the nude, before being shot by an unseen assassin. Badu's public nudity, guerrilla filming, and the video's allusions to the assassination of John F. Kennedy were met with controversy among fans and critics.

== Background and release ==
"Jump Up in the Air (Stay There)", featuring Lil Wayne and Bilal, was released as an internet-only promotional single on Badu's official website in January 2010. RC Williams, Badu's musical director, said that a music video for the track was shot in Dallas. A censored "clean" version of the video was released on February 12, 2010 on Badu's official website. It has been made available as a free, legal download by Giant Step, the marketing and promotion company for the album. "Window Seat" was released as the album's official lead single, Badu released a downloadable link to the song on her Twitter account. "Window Seat" was released to the iTunes Store on February 9, 2010. In its promotion, Delta Air Lines has signed on to use the song as boarding music for its flights.

== Reception ==
The song debuted at number 95 on the US Billboard Hot 100 chart. It also entered at number 47 on Billboard Hot R&B/Hip-Hop Songs chart, ultimately peaking at number 16 in its five weeks on the chart.

"Window Seat" received generally positive reviews from most music critics. PopMatters writer Quentin B. Huff found Badu's vulnerability on the song comparable to her work on Mama's Gun (2000). Allmusic's Andy Kellman wrote that it "should appeal to those who have wanted Badu to revisit that lissome sound of Baduizm songs like 'On & On' and 'Otherside of the Game,' and it packs stunning stomp-and-clap breakdowns that sync up with Badu's most halting lines". Embling of Tiny Mix Tapes called it "as amniotic a slow jam as Badu has ever recorded". BBC Online writer Stevie Chick praised Badu's performance on the song, writing that she sings "with such earnest, desperate yearning you'll be struck dumb". The Washington Post's Chris Richards described the song as "vintage Badu: gentle melodies, a twinkling harp, rim-shots click-clacking at an easy, Sunday morning tempo". Los Angeles Times writer Margaret Wappler praised co-producer and keyboardist James Poyser's contribution, writing that he "elevates" the song "into a juicy slice of escapism but with the security of someone missing you back home". The Village Voice's Pazz & Jop annual year-end critics' poll ranked "Window Seat" at number 11 to find the best music of 2010, tied with Arcade Fire's "Sprawl II (Mountains Beyond Mountains)" and LCD Soundsystem's "I Can Change".

== Music video ==
=== Background and synopsis ===
The song 'Window Seat' is about liberating yourself from layers and layers of skin or demons that are a hindrance to your growth or freedom, or evolution. I wanted to do something that said just that, so I started to think about shedding, nudity, taking things off in a very artful way.

— Erykah Badu, on the music video's underlying theme.

On March 13, 2010, Badu filmed an impromptu music video for "Window Seat" in the Dealey Plaza historic district of Dallas, Texas. In the video, Badu is seen walking the streets of Dealey Plaza in Dallas, slowly stripping to the nude, before being shot by an unseen assassin. On her Twitter feed, she stated that the music video "was shot guerrilla style, no crew, 1 take, no closed set, no warning, 2 min., Downtown Dallas, then ran like hell". Badu was inspired by indie rock duo Matt & Kim's video for the song "Lessons Learned", in which the musicians strip naked in Times Square, viewing it as "the bravest, most liberating thing I've ever seen two people do... I wanted to dedicate this contagious act of liberation and freedom to them. I hoped it would become something contagious that people would want to do in some way or another". Badu has expressed that her video is a criticism of the psychological concept groupthink. On the video's location, Badu expressed that Matt & Kim's video and its "monumental" Times Square setting influenced her to film in Dealey Plaza, which is known as the site of President John F. Kennedy's assassination. She viewed the historic district's grassy knoll as a monumental place in Dallas and that she "tied it in a way that compared that assassination to the character assassination one would go through after showing his or her self completely. That's exactly the action that I wanted to display". After she collapses to the ground in the video, blue blood spills out to form the word "groupthink", after which Badu's voiceover says:

They play it safe, are quick to assassinate what they do not understand. They move in packs ingesting more and more fear with every act of hate on one another. They feel most comfortable in groups, less guilt to swallow. They are us. This is what we have become. Afraid to respect the individual. A single person within a circumstance can move one to change. To love herself. To evolve.

— Erykah Badu, monologue in the video

Badu intended for the assassination scene to represent character assassination by groupthink. Prior to the filming of the official music video, a video teaser of "Window Seat" was featured on Badu's official website around early March, which begins with a shot of Badu's boarding pass of the flight she had booked on the fictional Amerykah Airlines, and mainly features her putting on make-up at a make-up table. A second version of the video, entitled "Window Seat (Reexamined)", was posted on her website and features the original video in reverse; the ending monologue with Badu's voiceover was repositioned to the start of the footage. A music video for the song's official remix, featuring rapper Rick Ross, was shot during May 2010.

=== Response and controversy ===
"Window Seat"'s official music video was premiered on March 27, 2010 at 3:33 a.m. on Badu's website. Circulating throughout several Internet blogs, the music video was received with controversy and a divided reaction from fans, Internet critics, and media outlets. On March 30, 2010, it became the ninth most popular search on Google. The music video also prompted attention from Dallas city officials for Badu's public nudity and filming without city permits. Dallas Mayor Pro Tem Dwaine Caraway expressed concern for stricter laws to prevent similar incidents, stating "None of this would have occurred had she stayed clothed. But since she didn't, it elevated the need for making sure that we have policies in place that will protect folks and the integrity of the city as best we possibly can ... What if there is another take to her bizarre activity? What if there is a part two and we don't take some type of action or put it up for discussion and she comes out and really gets with it and does a Michael Jackson-type video and have 15, 20 people and all of them take their clothes off?"

On April 2, 2010, Badu was charged with disorderly conduct for her public nudity, a class C misdemeanor in Texas indicating a $500 fine (with no jail time), when a witness came forward. According to Dallas Deputy Police Chief Mike Genovesi, the witness "had two small children with her and was offended". In an interview for the Dallas Morning News, Badu said that her part in the video foreshadowed the controversy and reaction to the video, stating "I knew that would happen, so as soon as the thought came to my mind, I decided to assassinate myself as a gesture. Because it was going to happen anyway. The video is a prediction of what is happening now". In an April 3, 2010 interview on The Wanda Sykes Show, she explained in response to critics of the video that she did not intend to disrespect the memory of John F. Kennedy with its allusion to his assassination, stating "My point was grossly misunderstood all over America. JFK is one of my heroes, one of the nation's heroes. John F. Kennedy was a revolutionary; he was not afraid to butt heads with America, and I was not afraid to show America my butt-naked truth." On April 28, 2010, Badu challenged the disorderly conduct charge by pleading not guilty rather than paying the fee by mail. On August 13, she paid the $500 fine and agreed to serve six months probation through February 11, 2011.

== Chart history ==
Weekly chart performance for "Window Seat"
Chart (2010)	Peak position
Japan (Japan Hot 100)	27
US Billboard Hot 100	75
US Hot R&B/Hip-Hop Songs (Billboard)	16
