= Sa-Ra =

American musical group from Los Angeles

- Origin: Los Angeles, California, U.S.
- Genres: Progressive soul; neo funk; alternative hip hop; indie soul
- Labels: Ubiquity; Babygrande; GOOD
- Members: Om'Mas Keith; Shafiq Husayn; Taz Arnold

The Sa-Ra Creative Partners, or simply Sa-Ra, is an American musical group from Los Angeles. The group is composed of Om'Mas Keith, Taz Arnold, and Shafiq Husayn. The name translates roughly to "the children of God". The group's name, style and creativity are allusions to the similarly named jazz composer Sun Ra. Their music has been described as progressive soul, neo funk, and alternative hip hop.

== History ==
Sa-Ra formed in the late 1990s from a trio of industry producers, musicians, and executives. The group’s discography includes songs with artists such as Jurassic 5 and Pharoahe Monch, and have collectively and/or individually produced songs for artists like Heavy D, Bilal (specifically his Love for Sale album), Dr. Dre, Jill Scott, Erykah Badu, Frank Ocean, Fonzworth Bentley, Jay-Z, John Legend and Goapele. The group had previously been signed to Kanye West's GOOD Music label, where it planned to release their debut album. The label was dissolved by distributor Sony BMG, and the group signed a deal with independent label Babygrande.

== Releases and recent music ==
Several singles and recordings have been released under the group's own name, primarily on independent labels such as ABB Records, Ubiquity Records, and Sound in Color and on various compilation albums, and include "Glorious," and singles "Double Dutch" and "Second Time Around." Newer material was released on the promotional SetUps and Justifications album sampler in mid-2006, including songs such as "Big Fame," "StarWars," and "Hollywood." Their "Second Time Around" single was released in CD format, and is generally available from major online retailers as well as iTunes. The group’s original vinyl singles ("Double Dutch" and "Glorious") were limited releases on Ubiquity Records. A full-length album, titled The Hollywood Recordings, was released on Babygrande Records on April 24, 2007.

In 2006, the group said that their sound is unlikely to gain much attention from MTV. However, beginning in 2009, Om'Mas Keith became a regular cast member on Diddy's MTV programme Making His Band drawing more attention to Sa-Ra.

== Discography ==
=== Albums ===
- The Hollywood Recordings (2007)
- Nuclear Evolution: The Age of Love (2009)

=== Appearances ===
- 2004: "Turn It Up", "Certified" (from the Krumbsnatcha album Let The Truth Be Told)
- 2005: "A Helluva Town" (from Impulsive! Revolutionary Jazz Reworked)
- 2005: "Deep Inside" (from the Platinum Pied Pipers album Triple P)
- 2007: "Space Fruit Interlude" (from the Talib Kweli album Eardrum)
- 2015: "Finale" (from the Ty Dolla $ign album Free TC)
