= List of awards and nominations received by Erykah Badu =

Erykah Badu awards and nominations
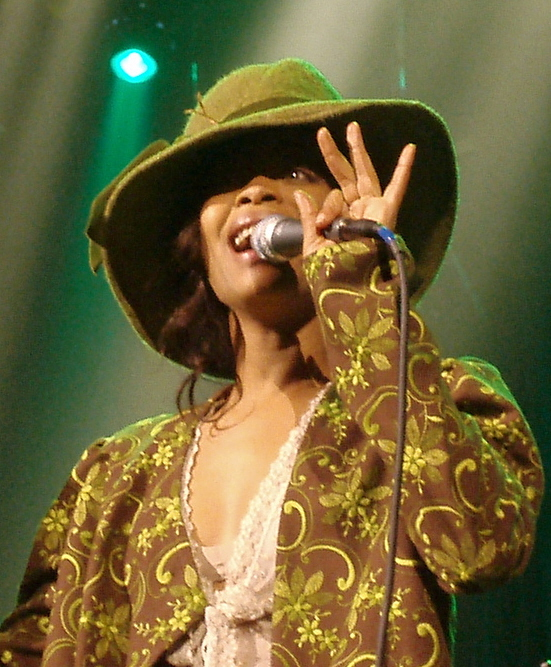
- Erykah performing at the 2004 MTV Video Music Awards in April 2004
Awards and nominations
Award	Wins	Nominations
American Music Awards	1	2
BET	2	7
Grammy	5	20
MTV VMA	1	6
NAACP	2	6
Soul Train	3	3
BETJ Virtual Awards	0	4
Black Reel Awards	0	2
Soul Train Lady of Soul Awards	3	7
Virgin Media Music Awards	0	1

Totals (Note: Certain award groups do not simply award one winner. They acknowledge several different recipients, have runners-up, and have third place. Since this is a specific recognition and is different from losing an award, runner-up mentions are considered wins in this award tally. For simplification and to avoid errors, each award in this list has been presumed to have had a prior nomination.)
- Wins: 18
- Nominations: 61

Erykah Badu is an American recording artist and actress.

In 1997, Badu received six nominations and won three, Favorite Female Solo Single for "On & On", Favorite Female Solo Album for Baduizm and Best R&B/Soul or Rap Song of the Year for "On & On" at the Soul Train Lady of Soul Awards. In 1998, Badu received fourteen nominations and won eight, including Favorite R&B/Soul or Rap New Artist at the American Music Awards; Best Female R&B Vocal Performance for "On & On" and Best R&B Album for Baduizm at the Grammy Awards; Outstanding New Artist and Outstanding Female Artist at the NAACP Image Awards; Favorite Female Soul/R&B Single for "On & On", Favorite Female Soul/R&B Album for Baduizm and Favorite New R&B/Soul or Rap New Artist for "On & On" at the Soul Train Music Awards.

In 2000, Badu received two nominations and won one, Best Rap Performance by a Duo or Group at the Grammy Awards. In 2003, Badu received twelve nominations and won two, including Video of the Year for "Love of My Life (An Ode to Hip-Hop)" at the BET Awards and Best Urban/Alternative Performance for "Love of My Life (An Ode to Hip-Hop)" at the Grammy Awards. In 2008, Badu received eleven nominations and won two, including Best Director for "Honey" at the BET Awards and Best Direction in a Video for "Honey" at the MTV Video Music Awards. Overall, Badu has won 16 awards from 59 nominations.

== American Music Awards ==
The American Music Awards is an annual awards ceremony created by Dick Clark in 1973. Badu has won one award from two nominations.

Year	Nominee / work	Award	Result
1998	Baduizm	Favorite Soul/R&B Album	Nominated
1998	Erykah Badu	Favorite R&B/Soul or Rap New Artist	Won

== BET Awards ==
The BET Awards were established in 2001 by the Black Entertainment Television (BET) network. Badu has won two awards from seven nominations.

Year	Nominee / work	Award	Result
2001	Erykah Badu	Best Female R&B Artist	Nominated
2003	Erykah Badu	Best Female R&B Artist	Nominated
2003	"Love of My Life (An Ode to Hip-Hop)"	Best Collaboration	Nominated
2003	"Love of My Life (An Ode to Hip-Hop)"	Video of the Year	Won
2003	"Love of My Life (An Ode to Hip-Hop)"	Viewer's Choice	Nominated
2008	"Honey"	Video of the Year	Nominated
2008	Erykah Badu	Best Video Director	Won

== BETJ Virtual Awards ==
The BETJ Virtual Awards is an annual awards ceremony to recognize jazz musicians. Badu has been nominated four times.

Year	Nominee / work	Award	Result
2008	New Amerykah Part One (4th World War)	Album of the Year	Nominated
2008	"Honey"	Song of the Year	Nominated
2008	"Honey"	Virtual Video of the Year	Nominated
2008	Erykah Badu	Live Performer of the Year	Nominated

== Billboard Women in Music ==
The Billboard Women in Music is an annual event held by Billboard. It is established to recognize women in the music industry who have made significant contributions to the business and who, through their work and continued success, inspire generations of women to take on increasing responsibilities within the field.

Year	Nominee / work	Award	Result
2025	Erykah Badu	Icon Award	Won

== Black Reel Awards ==
The Black Reel Awards is an annual awards ceremony to recognize African Americans in feature, independent and television films. Badu has been nominated two times.

Year	Nominee / work	Award	Result
2000	The Cider House Rules	Best Supporting Actress	Nominated
2003	"Love of My Life (An Ode to Hip-Hop)"	Best Original or Adapted Song	Nominated

== Grammy Awards ==
The Grammy Awards are awarded annually by the National Academy of Recording Arts and Sciences of the United States. Badu has won five awards from twenty nominations.

Year	Nominee / work	Award	Result
1998	Erykah Badu	Best New Artist	Nominated
1998	"On & On"	Best Female R&B Vocal Performance	Won
1998	"On & On"	Best Rhythm & Blues Song	Nominated
1998	Baduizm	Best R&B Album	Won
1999	"Tyrone"	Best Female R&B Vocal Performance	Nominated
1999	Live	Best R&B Album	Nominated
2000	"You Got Me" (with The Roots)	Best Rap Performance by a Duo or Group	Won
2001	"Bag Lady"	Best Female R&B Vocal Performance	Nominated
2001	"Bag Lady"	Best R&B Song	Nominated
2002	"Didn't Cha Know?"	Best R&B Song	Nominated
2003	"Love of My Life (An Ode to Hip-Hop)" (featuring Common)	Best Urban/Alternative Performance	Nominated
2003	"Love of My Life (An Ode to Hip-Hop)" (featuring Common)	Best R&B Song	Won
2003	"Love of My Life (An Ode to Hip-Hop)" (featuring Common)	Best Song Written for a Motion Picture, Television or Other Visual Media	Nominated
2004	"Back in the Day (Puff)"	Best Female R&B Vocal Performance	Nominated
2004	"Danger"	Best Urban/Alternative Performance	Nominated
2004	"Danger"	Best R&B Song	Nominated
2004	Worldwide Underground	Best R&B Album	Nominated
2007	"That Heat" (with Sergio Mendes and will.i.am)	Best Urban/Alternative Performance	Nominated
2009	"Honey"	Best Short Form Music Video	Nominated
2025	"3:AM" (with Rapsody)	Best Melodic Rap Performance	Won

== MTV Video Music Awards ==
The MTV Video Music Awards is an annual awards ceremony established in 1984 by MTV. Badu has one awards from six nominations.

Year	Nominee / work	Award	Result
1997	"On & On"	Best Female Video	Nominated
1997	"On & On"	Best R&B Video	Nominated
2008	"Honey"	Best Direction	Won
2008	"Honey"	Best Editing	Nominated
2008	"Honey"	Best Cinematography	Nominated
2008	"Honey"	Best Special Effects	Nominated

== NAACP Image Awards ==
The NAACP Image Awards is an award presented annually by the American National Association for the Advancement of Colored People to honor outstanding people of color in film, television, music and literature. Badu has won two awards from six nominations.

Year	Nominee / work	Award	Result
1998	Erykah Badu	Outstanding New Artist	Won
1998	Erykah Badu	Outstanding Female Artist	Won
2003	Erykah Badu & Common	Outstanding Duo or Group	Nominated
2003	Erykah Badu	Outstanding Female Artist	Nominated
2003	"Love of My Life (An Ode to Hip-Hop)"	Outstanding Music Video	Nominated
2003	"Love of My Life (An Ode to Hip-Hop)"	Outstanding Song	Nominated

== Soul Train Music Awards ==
The Soul Train Music Awards is an annual awards show that honors black musicians and entertainers. Badu has won three awards from five nominations.

Year	Nominee / work	Award	Result
1998	Erykah Badu	Best R&B/Soul or Rap New Artist	Won
1998	"On & On"	Best R&B/Soul Single, Female	Won
1998	Baduizm	Best R&B/Soul Album, Female	Won
2010	Erykah Badu	Best R&B/Soul Artist, Female	Nominated
2010	New Amerykah Part Two (Return of the Ankh)	Best R&B/Soul Album of the Year	Nominated

=== Soul Train Lady of Soul Awards ===
The Soul Train Lady of Soul Awards is an awards show that honors the accomplishments of women in the music industry. Badu has won three awards from seven nominations.

Year	Nominee / work	Award	Result
1997	Baduizm	Favorite Female Solo Album	Won
1997	"On & On"	Favorite Female Solo Single	Won
1997	"On & On"	Best R&B/Soul or Rap Song of the Year	Won
1997	"Next Lifetime"	Best R&B/Soul or Rap Music Video	Nominated
1998	"Tyrone"	Best R&B/Soul or Rap Song of the Year	Nominated
1998	"Tyrone"	Favorite Female Solo Single	Nominated
1998	Live	R&B/Soul Album of the Year	Nominated

== Virgin Media Music Awards ==
Badu has been nominated once.

Year	Nominee / work	Award	Result
2008	New Amerykah Part One (4th World War)	Best Album Cover	Nominated
