= Live (Erykah Badu album) =

Live album by Erykah Badu
- Released: November 18, 1997
- Recorded: 1997
- Studio: Sony (New York City)
- Genre: R&B; neo soul; hip hop
- Length: 74:42
- Label: Kedar; Universal
- Producer: Kedar Massenburg; Erykah Badu; Norman Hurt

Erykah Badu chronology
Baduizm (1997)	Live (1997)	Mama's Gun (2000)

Singles from Live
- 1. "Tyrone" Released: October 27, 1997

Live is a live concert album by American singer Erykah Badu, released in 1997. Released in the fall of 1997, with her debut album Baduizm released earlier that year, Live quickly went double platinum with the radio hit "Tyrone".

Live includes cover versions of songs by Rufus featuring Chaka Khan ("Stay"), Roy Ayers ("Searchin'") and a medley of Heatwave's "Boogie Nights", The Mary Jane Girls' "All Night Long", and "Funkin' for Jamaica (N.Y.)" by Tom Browne. The album opens with an interpolation of the jazz song So What by Miles Davis.

The album was nominated for Best R&B Album at the 1999 Grammy Awards, while the track "Tyrone" was nominated for Best Female R&B Vocal Performance.

== Background ==
After she signed to Universal Records, Badu released her debut studio album Baduizm, in early 1997. The album was met with critical and commercial success, debuting at number two on the Billboard charts and number one on the US Billboard Top R&B/Hip-Hop Albums. Baduizm's commercial and critical success helped establish Badu as one of the emerging neo soul genre's leading artists. Her particular style of singing drew many comparisons to Billie Holiday. Baduizm was certified three times platinum by the Recording Industry Association of America, Gold by the British Phonographic Industry and the Canadian Recording Industry Association. Badu recorded the live album while pregnant with son Seven, and the release of the recording coincided with his birth.

== Reception ==
Professional ratings
Review scores
Source	Rating
Allmusic	link
Entertainment Weekly	B+
Los Angeles Times	favorable
Rhapsody	favorable link
Robert Christgau	link
Rolling Stone	link
Uncut	3/5 stars

Upon release Live was met with acclaim from music critics. Leo Stanley of Allmusic praised Badu's decision to release a live album so shortly after releasing her debut: "Not only does it illustrate the depths of Badu's talents, but Live is as strong and captivating as Baduizm." A reviewer of Entertainment Weekly praised the album's jazz influenced sounds, calling the album "sassy" and "relaxed".

The album was released on November 18, 1997, and reached number four on the US Billboard 200 and number one on the US Billboard Top R&B/Hip-Hop Albums. The album was certified two times platinum by RIAA for shipments of over two million copies.

== Track listing ==
1. "Rimshot (Intro)" (Erykah Badu, Madukwu Chinwah, Miles Davis) – 3:50
2. "Otherside of the Game" (Badu, Questlove, Richard Nichols, James Poyser, The Roots) – 8:21
3. "On & On" (Badu, Jaborn Jamal) – 5:30
4. "Reprise" – 2:15
5. "Appletree" (Badu, Robert Bradford) – 4:04
6. "Ye Yo" (Badu) – 4:59
7. "Searching" (Roy Ayers) – 4:18
8. "Boogie Nights/All Night" (James A. Johnson, Rodney L. Temperton) – 6:28
9. "Certainly" (Badu, Chinwah) – 6:58
10. "Stay" (Rufus, Richard Calhoun, Chaka Khan) – 4:50
11. "Next Lifetime (Interlude)" (Badu, Tone The Backbone [Anthony Scott]) – 1:30
12. "Tyrone" (Badu, Norman "Keys" Hurt) – 3:41
13. "Next Lifetime" (Badu, Tone the Backbone [Anthony Scott]) – 12:07
14. "Tyrone" [Extended Version] (Badu, Hurt) – 5:45

== Charts ==
=== Weekly charts ===
Chart (1997–98)	Peak position
Australian Albums (ARIA)	171
Dutch Albums (Album Top 100)	5
UK Albums (OCC)	195
UK R&B Albums (OCC)	27
US Billboard 200	4
US Top R&B/Hip-Hop Albums (Billboard)	1

=== Year-end charts ===
Chart (1998)	Position
Dutch Albums (Album Top 100)	27
US Billboard 200	48
US Top R&B/Hip-Hop Albums (Billboard)	9

== Personnel ==
- Erykah Badu – vocals
- Charles "Poogie" Bell Jr. – drums
- Karen Bernod – background vocals
- Hubert Eaves IV – bass
- Norman "Keys" Hurt – keyboard
- N'dambi – background vocals
- Joyce M. Strong – background vocals

== Production ==
- Producers: Erykah Badu, Norman "Keys" Hurt
- Executive producers: Erykah Badu, Kedar Massenburg
- Engineers: Erykah Badu, Norman "Keys" Hurt, Gorden Mack, Kenny Ortíz
- Mixing: Erykah Badu, Norman "Keys" Hurt, Gorden Mack, Kenny Ortíz
- Mastering: Tom Coyne
- Art direction: D. Simmons, M. Warlow
- Cover art concept: Erykah Badu, Clymenza Hawkins
- Design: P. Geczik, Lance Ong
- Layout design: P. Geczik
- Photography: Imari Dusauzay, Imari Dusauzay
- Artwork: P. Geczik, Lance Ong

== See also ==
- List of number-one R&B albums of 1997 (U.S.)

== Certifications ==
Region	Certification	Certified units/sales
Netherlands (NVPI)	Platinum	100,000^{^}
United States (RIAA)	2× Platinum	2,000,000^{^}
^{^} Shipments figures based on certification alone.
