= Appletree (Erykah Badu song) =

Single by Erykah Badu

from the album Baduizm
- Released: November 17, 1997
- Studio: Battery Studios (New York, NY)
- Genre: R&B; neo soul
- Length: 4:25
- Label: Kedar; Universal
- Songwriter(s): Erykah Badu; Robert Bradford
- Producer(s): Ike Lee; Erykah Badu

Erykah Badu singles chronology
"Tyrone" (1997)	"Appletree" (1997)	"All Night Long" (1998)

"Appletree" is a song recorded by American singer Erykah Badu for her debut studio album Baduizm (1997). The song was written by Badu and Robert Bradford. It was released as the fourth and final single from Baduizm on November 17, 1997, by Kedar Records and Universal Records.

== Track listings and formats ==
European maxi CD1 single
No.	Title	Length
1.	"Appletree" (album version)	4:28
2.	"Appletree" (2B3 Summer Vibes Mix)	4:37
3.	"Otherside of the Game" (live at The Jazz Cafe)	5:32
4.	"Next Lifetime" (Linslee Remix)	5:53

European maxi CD2 single
No.	Title	Length
1.	"Appletree" (album version)	4:28
2.	"Appletree" (2B3 Hip Hop Mix)	4:34
3.	"Appletree" (live at The Jazz Cafe)	3:00
4.	"Sometimes" (live at The Jazz Cafe)	5:13

== Charts ==
Weekly chart performance for "Appletree"
Chart (1997–1998)	Peak position
Scotland (OCC)	85
UK Singles (OCC)	47
UK Hip Hop/R&B (OCC)	11
US Adult R&B Songs (Billboard)	23
US R&B/Hip-Hop Airplay (Billboard)	30

== Release history ==
Release dates and formats for "Appletree"
Region	Date	Format(s)	Label(s)	Ref.
United Kingdom	November 17, 1997	Cassette; two maxi CDs	Kedar; Universal	
United States	April 6, 1998	Urban contemporary radio	Kedar; Universal	
United States	April 7, 1998	Contemporary hit radio; rhythmic contemporary radio	Kedar; Universal	

== Bibliography ==
- Roberts, David (2006). British Hit Singles & Albums (19th ed.). London: Guinness World Records. p. 39. ISBN 1-904994-10-5.
