= List of Billboard number-one R&B albums of 1997 =

These are the Billboard magazine R&B albums that reached number-one in 1997.

== Chart history ==
Issue date	Album	Artist
January 4	The Preacher's Wife	Soundtrack / Whitney Houston
January 11	The Preacher's Wife	Soundtrack / Whitney Houston
January 18	The Don Killuminati: The 7 Day Theory	Makaveli
January 25	The Don Killuminati: The 7 Day Theory	Makaveli
February 1	Rhyme & Reason	Soundtrack / Various artists
February 8	The Don Killuminati: The 7 Day Theory	Makaveli
February 15	Gridlock'd	Soundtrack / Various artists
February 22	Gridlock'd	Soundtrack / Various artists
March 1	Baduizm	Erykah Badu
March 8	Baduizm	Erykah Badu
March 15	Baduizm	Erykah Badu
March 22	Baduizm	Erykah Badu
March 29	The Untouchable	Scarface
April 5	The Untouchable	Scarface
April 12	Life After Death	The Notorious B.I.G.
April 19	Life After Death	The Notorious B.I.G.
April 26	Life After Death	The Notorious B.I.G.
May 3	Life After Death	The Notorious B.I.G.
May 10	Share My World	Mary J. Blige
May 17	Share My World	Mary J. Blige
May 24	Share My World	Mary J. Blige
May 31	Share My World	Mary J. Blige
June 7	I'm Bout It	Soundtrack / Various artists
June 14	God's Property from Kirk Franklin's Nu Nation	God's Property
June 21	I'm Bout It	Soundtrack / Various artists
June 28	Wu-Tang Forever	Wu-Tang Clan
July 5	God's Property from Kirk Franklin's Nu Nation	God's Property
July 12	God's Property from Kirk Franklin's Nu Nation	God's Property
July 19	God's Property from Kirk Franklin's Nu Nation	God's Property
July 28	God's Property from Kirk Franklin's Nu Nation	God's Property
August 2	Supa Dupa Fly	Missy "Misdemeanor" Elliott
August 9	No Way Out	Puff Daddy and the Family
August 16	The Art of War	Bone Thugs-n-Harmony
August 23	No Way Out	Puff Daddy and the Family
August 30	No Way Out	Puff Daddy and the Family
September 6	No Way Out	Puff Daddy and the Family
September 13	No Way Out	Puff Daddy and the Family
September 20	Ghetto D	Master P
September 27	Ghetto D	Master P
October 4	When Disaster Strikes	Busta Rhymes
October 11	Evolution	Boyz II Men
October 18	Soul Food	Soundtrack / Various artists
October 25	Gang Related	Soundtrack / Various artists
November 1	Gang Related	Soundtrack / Various artists
November 8	The Firm: The Album	The Firm feat. Nas, Foxy Brown, Nature and AZ
November 15	Harlem World	Mase
November 22	The 18th Letter	Rakim
November 29	Unpredictable	Mystikal
December 6	Live	Erykah Badu
December 13	R U Still Down? (Remember Me)	2Pac
December 20	R U Still Down? (Remember Me)	2Pac
December 27	Live	Erykah Badu

== See also ==
- 1997 in music
- R&B number-one hits of 1997 (USA)
