= Scars of the Soul Are Why Kids Wear Bandages When They Don't Have Bruises =

2004 book by Miles Marshall Lewis

- Author: Miles Marshall Lewis
- Language: English
- Publisher: Akashic Books
- Publication place: United States
- Pages: 197
- ISBN: 978-1-888451-71-9

Scars of the Soul Are Why Kids Wear Bandages When They Don't Have Bruises is a 2004 collection of essays by Miles Marshall Lewis. It was published by Akashic Books.

== Contents ==
I. Memory Lanes, Gun Hill Roads

- Bronx Science
- Famous Negro Writer #77
- The Suckerpunch of My Childhood Files
- Mama's Gun
- Worldwide Underground

II. The Def of Hiphop

- Peace, Unity, Love, Having Fun
- Notes Toward a Hiphop Politick
  - Appeared first in 2003 in The Nation under the title "Russell Simmons's Rap."
- Spelmo Babies and Other Bourgeois Ephemera
  - Appeared first in 1997 in LA Weekly under the title "All About the Benjamins."
- Go Make of All Disciples
- Scars of the Soul Are Why Kids Wear Bandages When They Don't Have Bruises
- Another Great Day in Harlem
  - Appeared first in 1998 in XXL under the title "Hip-Hop America."
