= Tyrone (song) =

Single by Erykah Badu

from the album Live
- B-side: "On & On"
- Released: October 27, 1997
- Recorded: 1997
- Genre: Neo soul; soul
- Length: 3:56
- Label: Kedar; Universal
- Songwriter(s): Erykah Badu; Norman "Keys" Hurt
- Producer(s): Erykah Badu; Norman "Keys" Hurt

Erykah Badu singles chronology
"Otherside of the Game" (1997)	"Tyrone" (1997)	"Appletree" (1998)

"Tyrone" is a song recorded by American singer Erykah Badu during a concert in 1997. It was released as the lead single from her live album Live (1997) on October 27, 1997, by Kedar Records and Universal Records. She has performed this for encore during concerts, and many consider it to be her signature song.

Released for airplay only, "Tyrone" was a moderate commercial success, peaking at number 62 on the US Radio Songs. However, it became Badu's third number-one single on the US R&B/Hip-Hop Airplay.

== Accolades ==
Accolades for "Tyrone"
Year	Publication	Accolade	Rank	Ref.
2021	Rolling Stone	The 500 Greatest Songs of All Time	448	

== Commercial performance ==
"Tyrone" did not receive a commercial release in the United States, hence it was ineligible to enter the US Billboard Hot 100, as Billboard's rules at the time did not allow airplay-only songs to enter the main charts. It peaked at number 62 on the US Radio Songs, spending five weeks on the chart. It fared better on the urban charts, peaking atop the R&B/Hip-Hop Airplay and becoming her third number-one on the chart. The song debuted at number 39 on the Rhythmic Top 40, peaking at number 24 in its third week and spending a total of six weeks on the chart. Internationally, "Tyrone" charted only in the Netherlands, where it debuted at number 95 on the Dutch Single Top 100 and peaked at number 19 in its sixth week, charting for a total of 15 weeks.

== Music video ==
The accompanying music video for "Tyrone" shows Badu performing the song live.

== Legacy ==
Since its release, "Tyrone" has been referenced in other media, most notably in the film Next Friday (2000), when the character Tyrone is making a fake call at a restaurant. The song's title was also referenced by Beyoncé in her song "Kitty Kat" (2006) and in the rap of 3LW's single "No More (Baby I'ma Do Right)" (2000), as well as by R. Kelly in the song "When a Woman's Fed Up" (1998). The song was covered by American rock band My Morning Jacket on their compilation album Early Recordings (2004). A modified version plays over the end credits of the 2023 film They Cloned Tyrone and features on the film's soundtrack.

== Track listings and formats ==
US 7-inch vinyl

1. "Tyrone" (clean live version) – 4:40
2. "On & On" – 3:47

European CD single

1. "Tyrone" (live album version) – 3:56
2. "Tyrone" (extended version) – 5:40

European maxi CD single

1. "Tyrone" (live album version) – 3:56
2. "Tyrone" (clean version) – 3:00
3. "Tyrone" (extended clean version) – 5:40
4. "Tyrone" (instrumental) – 5:40

== Credits and personnel ==
Credits adapted from AllMusic.

- Erykah Badu – creation, mixing, primary artist, production, vocals
- Poogie Bell – drums
- Karen Bernod – backing vocals
- Tom Coyne – mastering
- Hubert Eaves IV – bass
- Norman "Keys" Hurt – creation, keyboards, mixing, producer
- Gorden Mack – mixing
- Kedar Massenburg – executive producer
- N'Dambi – backing vocals
- Kenny Ortíz – engineering, mixing
- Joyce M. Strong – backing vocals

== Charts ==
Weekly chart performance for "Tyrone"
Chart (1997–1998)	Peak position
Netherlands (Single Top 100)	19
US Radio Songs (Billboard)	62
US Adult R&B Songs (Billboard)	1
US R&B/Hip-Hop Airplay (Billboard)	1
US Rhythmic (Billboard)	24

== Release history ==
Release dates and formats for "Tyrone"
Region	Date	Format(s)	Label(s)	Ref.
United States	October 27, 1997	Urban contemporary radio	Kedar; Universal	
