= Baduizm =

1997 studio album by Erykah Badu

Studio album by Erykah Badu
- Released: February 11, 1997
- Recorded: January–October 1996
- Studios: Sigma Sound, Philadelphia, Pennsylvania; Ivory, Philadelphia, Pennsylvania; Battery, New York City; Dallas Sound Lab, Dallas, Texas
- Genres: R&B; neo soul; jazz; hip hop
- Length: 58:15
- Labels: Kedar; Universal
- Producers: Madukwu Chinwah; Bob Power; JaBorn Jamal; Ike Lee III; Erykah Badu; the Roots; Richard Nichols; James Poyser; Tone the Backbone; Jaífar Barron; Robert Bradford

Erykah Badu chronology
Baduizm (1997)	Live (1997)

Singles from Baduizm
- 1. "On & On" Released: December 10, 1996; 2. "Next Lifetime" Released: June 2, 1997; 3. "Otherside of the Game" Released: September 22, 1997; 4. "Appletree" Released: November 17, 1997

Baduizm is the debut studio album by American singer-songwriter Erykah Badu. It was released on February 11, 1997, by Kedar Records and Universal Records. After leaving university in order to concentrate on music full-time, Badu then began touring with her cousin, Robert "Free" Bradford, and recorded a 19-song demo, Country Cousins, which attracted the attention of Kedar Massenburg. He set Badu up to record a duet with D'Angelo, "Your Precious Love," and eventually signed her to a record deal with Universal. Recording sessions for the album took place from January to October 1996 in New York City, Philadelphia, and Dallas.

Baduizm was met with positive reviews from music critics who praised the album's musical style and Badu's artistic vision; other critics noted similarities between Badu and Billie Holiday. Baduizm was a commercial success, debuting at number two on the US Billboard 200 chart and number one on the Billboard Top R&B/Hip-Hop Albums. The album was certified three times platinum by Recording Industry Association of America, Gold by British Phonographic Industry and Gold by the Canadian Recording Industry Association.

Baduizm was promoted with the release of four singles: "On & On", "Next Lifetime", "Otherside of the Game", and "Appletree". The album received many accolades, including the Grammy Award for Best R&B Album at the 40th Grammy Awards. Along with fellow contemporary albums such as D'Angelo's Brown Sugar (1995) and Maxwell's Urban Hang Suite (1996), Baduizm's success helped establish Badu as one of the leading artists in the neo-soul genre and is one of the albums credited with contributing to the genre's commercial visibility at the time.

== Background and recording ==
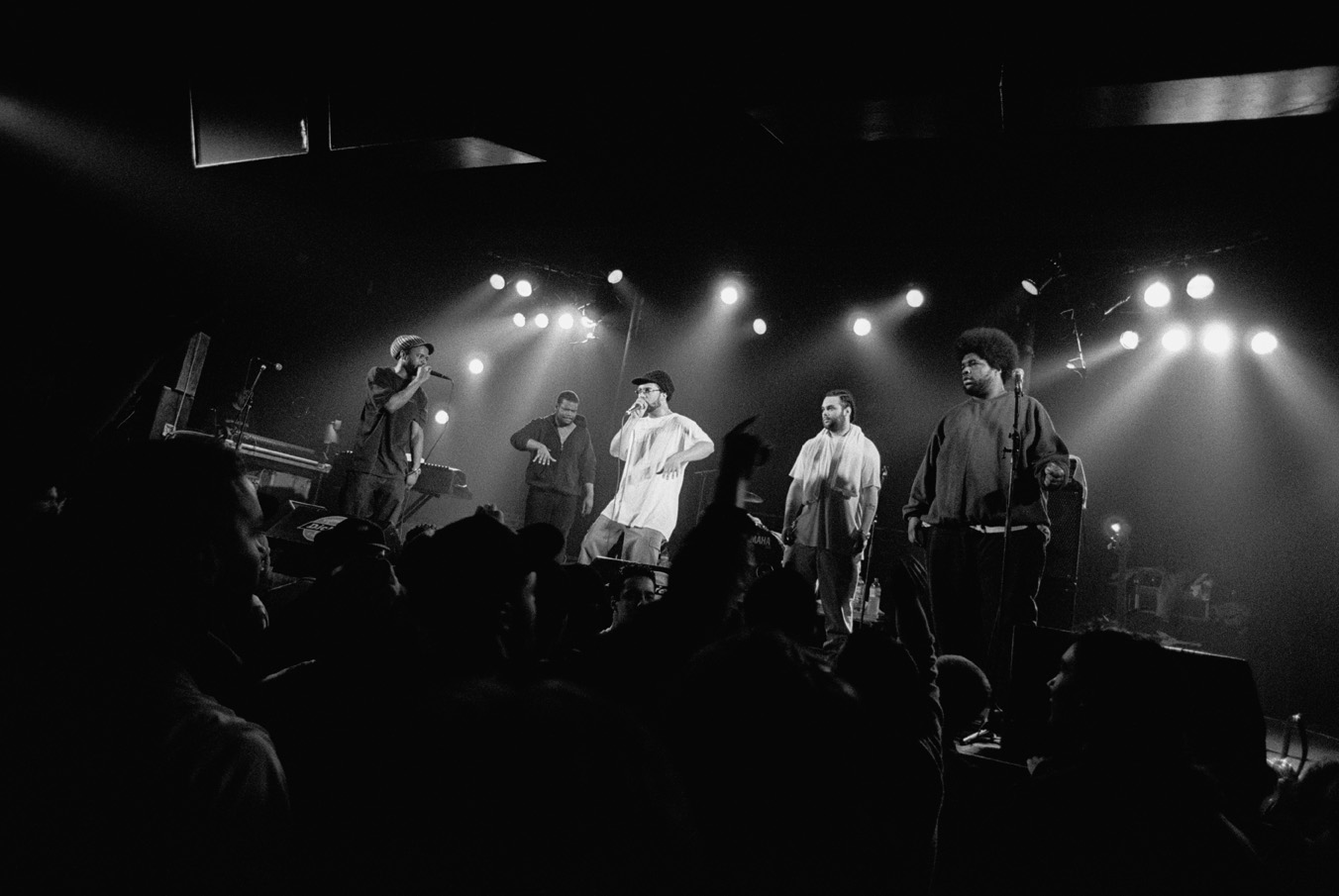
Badu collaborated with the Roots (pictured) during the production of the album.

To focus on music full time Badu dropped out from Grambling State University. Badu then began working and touring with her cousin, Robert "Free" Bradford, during this period she recorded a 19-song demo, Country Cousins, which attracted the attention of Kedar Massenburg. Massenburg set a recording session up with D'Angelo to record, "Your Precious Love," and eventually signed her to a record deal with Universal Records. Badu was partly influenced by Brandy's debut album, notably "I Wanna Be Down" and "Always on My Mind". Badu also took inspiration from her ancestry particularly turbans and African drums.

Recording sessions started in January through to October 1996 at Battery Studios in New York City, Sigma Sounds & Ivory Studios in Philadelphia, and Dallas Sound Lab in Dallas. Badu provided lead and background vocals, along with keyboards, drum machine and other music programming on the album with the help of Madukwu, N'Dambi, Bob Power, Ike Lee III, and Ron Carter. Shortly before the album's release, Badu grew unhappy with the recorded material and travelled back to Philadelphia to work with the Roots. The sessions led to the demo's "Otherside of the Game" and "Sometimes" being included on Baduizm.

== Release and sales ==
After Baduizm was released, it peaked at number two on the Billboard 200 and number one on the Top R&B/Hip-Hop Albums. The album's success helped establish Badu as one of the leading artists in the flourishing neo-soul genre. Baduizm was certified three times platinum by the Recording Industry Association of America, Gold by the British Phonographic Industry and the Canadian Recording Industry Association. As of February 2017 the album has sold 2.8 million copies in the United States.

The album produced four singles; the lead single "On & On" was released in December 1996, and reached number 12 on the US Billboard Hot 100 charts and the UK Singles Charts, as well as making an appearance on the New Zealand charts.

A world tour to promote the album featured performances in the United States, United Kingdom, Canada and Brazil. Band members on tour were Charles "Poogie" Bell Jr (drums), Bob Power (guitar), Hubert Eaves IV (bass) and Ike Lee III (keyboard). Background vocals were provided by N'dambi, Karen Bernod, Joyce M. Strong and Yahzarah. Opening acts included Chico DeBarge (USA—Leg), The Roots (USA—select dates) and Eric Benet (USA—select dates). Following the tour a Live concert album was recorded and released under Kedar/Universal.

== Critical reception ==
Professional ratings
Review scores
Source	Rating
AllMusic	4.5/5 stars
Chicago Tribune	3/4 stars
Entertainment Weekly	A
The Guardian	4/5 stars
NME	7/10
Pitchfork	9.5/10
Q	4/5 stars
Rolling Stone	3.5/5 stars
Uncut	9/10
USA Today	3.5/4 stars

Baduizm established Badu as a popular artist and received positive reviews from critics, who viewed the record as a return to the simplicity of early '70s soul. Vibe magazine's Karen R. Good called the record "a conduit of awakening of something dark, familiar and long slept," while John Bush from AllMusic felt it was innovative primarily for its sound, "heavier hip-hop beats over organic, conscientious soul music."

Badu's particular style of singing drew many comparisons to Billie Holiday. Entertainment Weekly said Badu echoed Holiday in "her phrasing and cadence," while Greg Kot from the Chicago Tribune commented: "Rather than merely mimicking Holiday, Badu offers a canny update of the socially conscious soul of the early '70s with her mid-tempo grooves and sultry, conversational vocals." In the Los Angeles Times, Robert Hilburn wrote: "Freely mixing musical eras and inspirations (Billie Holiday to Stevie Wonder, jazz to hip-hop), Badu combines supper-club sophistication with an artistic vision as unique and independent" as Prince in the '80s. Writing for Rolling Stone, Miles Marshall Lewis stated: "Baduizm showcases the heart and soul of a bohemian B-girl who happens to have an effortless jazz swing."

At the end of 1997, Baduizm was voted the seventh best record of the year in the Pazz & Jop, an annual poll of American critics published by The Village Voice. Robert Christgau, the poll's supervisor, was less enthusiastic and dismissed the comparisons to Billie Holiday, deeming Badu "a mite too bourgie-boho" for his tastes.

== Accolades ==
In 1997, Badu received six nominations and won three: Favorite Female Solo Single for "On & On", Favorite Female Solo Album for Baduizm and Best R&B/Soul or Rap Song of the Year for "On & On" at the Soul Train Lady of Soul Awards. In 1998, Badu received fourteen nominations and won eight, including Favorite R&B/Soul or Rap New Artist at the American Music Awards; Best Female R&B Vocal Performance for "On & On" and Best R&B Album for Baduizm at the Grammy Awards; Outstanding New Artist and Outstanding Female Artist at the NAACP Image Awards; Favorite Female Soul/R&B Single for "On & On", Favorite Female Soul/R&B Album for Baduizm and Favorite New R&B/Soul or Rap New Artist for "On & On" at the Soul Train Music Awards.

Baduizm is listed as one of the 261 greatest albums since punk and disco (the year 1976), in the music critic Garry Mulholland's book Fear of Music (ISBN 0-7528-6831-4). 'This record works as seduction soundtrack, Saturday night chill-out, Sunday morning church replacement. The success of Erykah Badu's masterpiece briefly threatened to inspire a new era in conscious soul. But only Lauryn Hill and D'Angelo were at her level. Baduizm stands alone, a missing link between '70s street funk, basement jazz, bohemian hip hop and the blues reinventions of Portishead."

In the 2020 reboot of their list of "The 500 Greatest Albums of All Time", Rolling Stone ranked Baduizm number 89.

== Track listing ==
No.	Title	Writer(s)	Producer(s)	Length
1.	"Rimshot (Intro)"	Erykah Badu, Madukwu Chinwah	Chinwah	1:56
2.	"On & On"	Badu, Jahmal "JaBorn" Cantero	Bob Power, JaBorn	3:45
3.	"Appletree"	Badu, Robert Bradford	Ike Lee III, Badu	4:25
4.	"Otherside of the Game"	Badu, Questlove, Richard Nichols, James Poyser	The Roots, Nichols	6:33
5.	"Sometimes (Mix #9)"	Badu, The Roots, Nichols, Poyser	The Roots, Nichols, Poyser	0:44
6.	"Next Lifetime"	Badu, Anthony Scott	Tone the Backbone	6:26
7.	"Afro (Freestyle Skit)"	Badu, Poyser, Jafar Barron	Badu, Poyser, Barron	2:04
8.	"Certainly"	Badu, Chinwah	Chinwah	4:43
9.	"4 Leaf Clover"	David Lewis, Wayne Lewis	Ike Lee III, Badu	4:34
10.	"No Love"	Badu, Bradford	Bradford	5:08
11.	"Drama"	Badu, Tyallen Macklin	Bob Power	6:02
12.	"Sometimes..."	Badu, The Roots, Nichols, Poyser	The Roots, Nichols, Poyser	4:10
13.	"Certainly (Flipped It)"	Badu, Chinwah	Chinwah	5:26
14.	"Rimshot (Outro)"	Badu, Chinwah	Chinwah	2:19
Total length:				58:15

Special edition bonus tracks
No.	Title	Writer(s)	Producer(s)	Length
15.	"On & On" (Jazz Mix)	Erykah Badu, JaBorn Jamal, Bob Powers	Bill Esses, Sir Charles	6:46
16.	"On & On" (Da Boom Squad Remix)	Erykah Badu, JaBorn Jamal, Bob Powers	Da Boom Squad	4:23
17.	"Appletree" (2B3 Summer Vibes Mix)	Erykah Badu, Robert Bradford, Ike Lee III	Neville Thomas, Pule Pheto, Robert Malcolm	4:35
18.	"Appletree" (Live @ The Jazz Café)	Erykah Badu, Robert Bradford, Ike Lee III	Ike Lee III, Erykah Badu	3:03
19.	"Next Lifetime" (Linslee Remix)	Erykah Badu, A. Scott, Tone the Backbone	Linslee Campbell	5:55
20.	"A Child with the Blues" (featuring Terrance Blanchard)		Curtis Mayfield	5:13

Sample credits

- "Appletree" interpolates "On & On".
- “4 Leaf Clover” covers “Touch A Four Leaf Clover” by Atlantic Starr.
- "No Love" samples "Lucky Fellow" by Leroy Hutson & interpolates "I Love You Too Much" by Stevie Wonder.
- "Drama" interpolates "Pastime Paradise" by Stevie Wonder.
- "Sometimes" samples "I Feel Like Loving You Today" by Donald Byrd and 125th St, NYC.
- "Certainly (Flipped It)" samples "Summer Madness" by Kool & The Gang"

== Personnel ==
Musicians

- Erykah Badu – keyboards (track 3), lead vocals (all tracks), background vocals (tracks 2–6, 8–9, 11)
- Ron Carter – bass (track 11)
- Madukwu Chinwah – additional voices (track 13)
- Ike Lee III – keyboards (track 3, track 9; additional on track 10)
- N'Dambi – additional voices (track 13)
- Bob Power – guitar (track 11), keyboards (11), multiple instruments (2)
- Tone The Backbone – multiple instruments (track 6)

Production

- Producers: Erykah Badu (tracks 3, 7, 9), Jaifar Barron (7), Robert Bradford (10), Madukwu Chinwah (1, 8, 13–14), Jamal "Jaborn Jamal" Cantero (2), Ike Lee III (3,9), Richard Nichols (4–5, 12), Bob Power (2, 11), James Poyser (5, 7, 12), The Roots (4–5, 12), Tone The Backbone (6)
- Executive producer: Kedar Massenburg
- Recording engineers: Lee Anthony (track 11), Tim Donovan (Additional on 2), Michael Gilbert (1, 3, 6–7, 9–10, 13–14), David Ivory (4–5, 7, 12), Anthony Lee, Bob Power (2, 11), Frank Salazar (8, 10), Chris Trevett (1, 6, 8, 14)
- Assistant engineers: Paul Shatraw (track 13), Sharon Kearney (11), Charles McCrorey (1–2, 6–9, 11, 14), John Meredith (1, 3, 10, 14)
- Mixing: Ken "Duro" Ifill (tracks 1, 7, 10, 13–14), Tim Latham (3–6, 8–9, 12), Bob Powers (2, 11)
- Mixing assistants: Martin Czembor (tracks 1, 3, 5–7, 9–10, 12–14), Tim Donovan (2, 11), Paul Shatraw (4–6, 8, 12)
- Music Programming: Erykah Badu (track 3), Ike Lee III (3,9), Bob Power (2), Tone The Backbone (6)
- Additional Drum Machines: Erykah Badu (track 10), John Meredith (10)
- Art direction: Sandie Lee Drake
- Design: Susan Bibeau
- Photography: Marc Baptiste
- Stylist: Andrew Dosunmu

== Charts ==
=== Weekly charts ===
Weekly chart performance for Baduizm
Chart (1997)	Peak position
Australian Albums (ARIA)	100
Canada Top Albums/CDs (RPM)	25
Dutch Albums (Album Top 100)	32
European Albums (Music & Media)	42
Finnish Albums (Suomen virallinen lista)	26
New Zealand Albums (RMNZ)	32
Norwegian Albums (VG-lista)	26
Scottish Albums (Official Charts)	71
Swedish Albums (Sverigetopplistan)	7
UK Albums (Official Charts)	17
UK Jazz & Blues Albums (Official Charts)	1
UK R&B Albums (Official Charts)	1
US Billboard 200	2
US Top R&B/Hip-Hop Albums (Billboard)	1

=== Year-end charts ===
Year-end chart performance for Baduizm
Chart (1997)	Position
UK Albums (OCC)	94
US Billboard 200	20
US Top R&B/Hip-Hop Albums (Billboard)	2

== Certifications ==
Certifications for Baduizm
Region	Certification	Certified units/sales
Canada (Music Canada)	Platinum	100,000^{‡}
United Kingdom (BPI)	Platinum	300,000^{‡}
United States (RIAA)	3× Platinum	3,000,000^{^}
^{^} Shipments figures based on certification alone.^{‡} Sales+streaming figures based on certification alone.

== Awards ==
Grammy Awards

Grammy Award wins and nominations for Baduizm
Year	Recipient	Category	Result
1998	Baduizm	Best R&B Album	Won
1998	"On & On"	Best Female R&B Vocal Performance	Won
1998	"On & On"	Best R&B Song	Nominated
1998	Erykah Badu	Best New Artist	Nominated

== See also ==
- List of Billboard number-one R&B albums of 1997
