= On & On (Erykah Badu song) =

1997 single by Erykah Badu

- US CD maxi-single

Single by Erykah Badu

from the album Baduizm
- A-side: "Next Lifetime" (Japan only)
- B-side: "Certainly (Flipped It)"
- Released: December 10, 1996
- Recorded: January 1996
- Studio: Battery Studios (New York, NY)
- Genre: Neo soul
- Length: 3:45
- Label: Kedar; Universal
- Songwriters: Erykah Badu; JaBorn Jamal
- Producers: Madukwu Chinwah; Erykah Badu

Erykah Badu singles chronology
"On & On" (1996)	"Next Lifetime" (1997)

Music video
- "On & On" on YouTube

"On & On" is a song by American singer-songwriter Erykah Badu, released on December 10, 1996, by Kedar Records and Universal Records, as the lead single from Badu's debut studio album, Baduizm (1997). It was written by her with JaBorn Jamal while she produced it with Madukwu Chinwah. A neo soul song, it features teachings of the Five-Percent Nation in its lyrics. A commercial success, it spent two weeks atop the US Billboard Hot R&B Singles chart, while peaking at number 12 on both the Billboard Hot 100 and the UK Singles Chart. Critically acclaimed, the song won Best Female R&B Vocal Performance at the 40th Annual Grammy Awards (1998). Its accompanying music video was nominated in the categories for Best Female Video and Best R&B Video at the 1997 MTV Video Music Awards. In 2022, Pitchfork included "On & On" in their list of "The 250 Best Songs of the 1990s".

== Critical reception ==
In a retrospective review, Patrick Corcoran of Albumism said that "with its talk of ciphers and cups of tea", 'On & On' cast Badu "as serenely disassociated from the troubles and strife of the world, somehow able to rise above it all." Larry Flick from Billboard magazine wrote, "While everyone else is trying to mimic Faith Evans and Mary J. Blige, newcomer Badu is going one step further. She is taking the jeep-soul concept and expanding it with her own new ideas. With the aid of producers Bob Power and Jamal Cantero, she infuses elements of African culture with a touch of Middle-Eastern vocal flavor. The result is a refreshing and adventurous single that could easily lure hard-core hip-hop kids—and their parents, too. This bodes extremely well for the creative depth and commercial reach of the forthcoming album Baduizm."

Ralph Tee from Music Week's RM Dance Update gave the song a score of four out of five, noting that Badu "sounds a touch like a young Ella Fitzgerald on this sparse but effective debut. Booming bass, jazzy keyboards and percussion hold the track together, this not being the most typical of R&B records but a healthy alternative to the hip hop/swing side of soul that D'Angelo and Maxwell have already lapped into." David Fricke from Rolling Stone remarked the singer's "battered but steady-rollin' pride" on the track. Eric Henderson from Slant Magazine viewed it as "mystic", writing, "'On & On' is, in practice, little more than a dinosaur heartbeat synchronized with that low-end-theory bassline, were it not for Badu's minor-key epigrams drifting like stray gauze throughout."

== Music video ==
Erykah Badu is depicted as a maid in a black family household in the accompanying music video for the single, showing her doing her chores. Scenes of her chasing a dog that bit the laundry that she put to dry, tying a little girl's hair into a ponytail and falling into mud could be seen throughout the video. The video ends with Badu dressed fully in green with several people in a farm, singing and dancing. The video is loosely based upon the 1985 film adaptation of Alice Walker's The Color Purple. The video was also nominated at the 1997 MTV Video Music Awards, including Best Female Video and Best R&B Video.

== Impact and legacy ==
In 2011, Slant Magazine ranked the song number 46 in their list of "The 100 Best Singles of the 1990s", writing, "Boasting the roundest bassline since Digable Planets got cool like dat, 'On & On' is Erykah Badu's mission statement from a higher plane. Her money might be gone, she might be all alone, but she's feeling high and mighty, and the siren song pours forth from her honeyed lips like a fount of alien wisdom. Backed by a languorously snapping, swinging backbeat and expansive, half-heard piano chords that repeatedly collapse back on themselves, 'On & On' is as sonically introspective as its creator, a woman who can believably claim to have walked the entire cipher of Earth, clear her throat, utter Goddammit, I'ma sing my song, and still seem like she's hiding more than she's revealing." In 2017, Billboard magazine ranked it number 43 in their list of "The 100 Greatest Pop Songs of 1997". In 2022, Pitchfork ranked it number 56 in their list of "The 250 Best Songs of the 1990s".

== Track listings and formats ==
- US 12-inch vinyl
1. "On & On" (album version) – 3:47
2. "On & On" (clean version) – 3:47
3. "On & On" (instrumental) – 3:47
4. "On & On" (a cappella) – 3:47
- US cassette single
1. "On & On" (album version) – 3:47
2. "On & On" (clean version) – 3:47
3. "On & On" (instrumental) – 3:47
4. Baduizm snippets ("Otherside of the Game"/"Next Lifetime"/"Sometimes..."/"4 Leaf Clover") – 5:08
- US CD single
1. "On & On" (album version) – 3:47
2. Baduizm snippets ("Otherside of the Game"/"Next Lifetime"/"Sometimes..."/"4 Leaf Clover") – 5:08
- US maxi CD single
1. "On & On" (clean version) – 3:47
2. "On & On" (album version) – 3:47
3. "On & On" (a cappella) – 3:47
4. "On & On" (instrumental) – 3:47
5. Baduizm snippets ("Otherside of the Game"/"Next Lifetime"/"Sometimes..."/"4 Leaf Clover") – 5:08
- US 12-inch vinyl (dance mix)
1. "On & On" (dance mix) – 3:50
2. "Certainly (Flipped It)" – 5:26
3. "On & On" (dance mix) (extended version) – 6:44
4. "On & On" (dance mix) (instrumental) – 6:44
- UK 12-inch vinyl
1. "On & On" (album version) – 3:47
2. "On & On" (club mix) – 3:54
3. "On & On" (Da Boom Squad Remix) – 5:18
4. "On & On" (Blu Mar Ten Remix) – 7:51
- UK cassette single
1. "On & On" (album version) – 3:47
2. "On & On" (clean version) – 3:47
- UK maxi CD single
1. "On & On" (clean version) – 3:47
2. "On & On" (album version) – 3:47
3. "On & On" (club mix) – 3:54
4. "On & On" (Da Boom Squad Remix) – 5:18
5. "On & On" (Blu Mar Ten Remix) – 7:51
- European maxi CD single
1. "On & On" (album version) – 3:47
2. "On & On" (a cappella) – 3:47
3. "On & On" (instrumental) – 3:47
4. Baduizm snippets ("Otherside of the Game"/"Next Lifetime"/"Sometimes..."/"4 Leaf Clover") – 5:08
- Japanese maxi CD single
1. "Next Lifetime" (album version) – 6:30
2. "Next Lifetime" (radio edit) – 4:15
3. "Next Lifetime" (instrumental) – 6:30
4. "On & On" (dance mix) – 3:50

== Charts ==
=== Weekly charts ===
Chart (1997)	Peak position
Canada Dance/Urban (RPM)	15
Europe (Eurochart Hot 100)	64
Israel (Israeli Singles Chart)	23
New Zealand (Recorded Music NZ)	44
Scottish Singles Sales (Official Charts)	21
UK Singles (Official Charts)	12
UK Dance (Official Charts)	5
UK Hip Hop/R&B (Official Charts)	3
US Billboard Hot 100	12
US Dance Singles Sales (Billboard)	3
US Hot R&B/Hip-Hop Songs (Billboard)	1
US Rhythmic Airplay (Billboard)	23

=== Year-end charts ===
Chart (1997)	Position
US Billboard Hot 100	83
US Hot R&B Singles (Billboard)	9
US Maxi-Singles Sales (Billboard)	26

== Certifications ==
Region	Certification	Certified units/sales
New Zealand (RMNZ)	Gold	15,000^{‡}
United Kingdom (BPI)	Gold	400,000^{‡}
United States (RIAA)	Gold	500,000
^{‡} Sales+streaming figures based on certification alone.

== Release history ==
Release dates and formats for "On & On"
Region	Date	Format(s)	Label(s)	Ref.
United States	December 10, 1996	Rhythmic contemporary radio	Kedar; Universal	
United States	January 7, 1997	Cassette; CD; maxi CD	Kedar; Universal	
United States	February 25, 1997	Contemporary hit radio	Kedar; Universal	
United Kingdom	April 7, 1997	12-inch vinyl; cassette; maxi CD	Kedar; Universal	
Japan	June 21, 1997	Maxi CD (Note: In Japan, "On & On" was released as a double A-side single with "Next Lifetime".)	MCA	

== See also ==
- List of number-one R&B singles of 1997 (U.S.)
