= Erykah Badu =

American singer (born 1971)

- Badu in 2025
- Born: Erica Abi Wright; February 26, 1971 (age 55); Dallas, Texas, U.S.
- Occupations: Singer; songwriter; record producer; actress
- Years active: 1994–present
- Works: Discography
- Partners: André 3000 (1995–1998); The D.O.C. (2003–2004); Jay Electronica (2004–2009)
- Children: 3
- Awards: Full list
- Musical career
- Genres: R&B; neo soul; psychedelic soul; conscious hip-hop
- Instrument: Vocals
- Labels: Control Freaq; Motown; Kedar; Universal; Empire; Young
- Formerly of: Soulquarians

Erica Abi Wright (born February 26, 1971), known professionally as Erykah Badu, is an American singer, songwriter, record producer, and actress. Influenced by R&B, soul, and hip-hop, Badu rose to prominence in the late 1990s when her debut studio album Baduizm (1997), placed her at the forefront of the neo soul movement, earning her the nickname "Queen of Neo Soul" by music critics.

Badu's career began after opening a show for D'Angelo in 1994 in Fort Worth, which led to record label executive Kedar Massenburg signing her to Kedar Entertainment. Badu's first album, Baduizm, was released in February 11, 1997. It spawned four singles: "On & On", "Appletree", "Next Lifetime" and "Otherside of the Game". The album was certified triple platinum by the Recording Industry Association of America (RIAA). Badu's first live album, Live, was released in November 1997, and contained her signature song "Tyrone" and was subsequently certified double platinum by the RIAA.

Badu's second studio album, Mama's Gun, was released in 2000. It spawned three singles: "Bag Lady", which became her first top 10 single on the Billboard Hot 100 peaking at number 6, "Didn't Cha Know?" and "Cleva". The album was certified platinum by the RIAA. Badu's third album, Worldwide Underground, was released in 2003. It generated three singles: "Love of My Life (An Ode to Hip-Hop)", "Danger" and "Back in the Day (Puff)", with the first becoming her second song to reach the top 10 of the Billboard Hot 100, peaking at number 9. The album was certified gold by the RIAA. Badu's fourth album, New Amerykah Part One, was released in 2008. It spawned two singles: "Honey" and "Soldier". New Amerykah Part Two was released in 2010 and fared well both critically and commercially. It contained the album's lead single "Window Seat", whose music video sparked controversy.

Badu's voice has been compared to jazz singer Billie Holiday. Early in her career, Badu was recognizable for her style, which often included wearing very large and colorful headwraps. She was a core member of the Soulquarians. As an actress, she has played a number of supporting roles in movies including Blues Brothers 2000, The Cider House Rules and House of D. She also has appeared in the documentaries Before the Music Dies and The Black Power Mixtape 1967-1975.

== Early life ==
Badu was born in Dallas, Texas. She was raised by her mother, actress Kolleen Wright, along with her younger siblings: brother Eevin and sister Koryan. Her parents separated when Erica was young.

Badu began singing and dancing at the age of four alongside her mother. She performed at the Dallas Theater Center and The Black Academy of Arts and Letters (TBAAL) under the guidance of her godmother, Gwen Hargrove, and her uncle, TBAAL founder Curtis King.

By the age of 14, Badu was freestyling for a local radio station alongside artists such as Roy Hargrove. In her youth, she had decided to change the spelling of her first name from Erica to Erykah, as she believed her original name was a "slave name". The term "kah" signifies the inner self. She adopted the surname "Badu" because it is her favorite jazz scat sound.

After graduating from Booker T. Washington High School for the Performing and Visual Arts, Badu went on to study theater at Grambling State University, a historically black university. She left the university in 1993 before graduating, to focus more fully on music. In 1995, she moved to Brooklyn to finish her debut album.

She formed a band Erykah Free with her cousin, Robert "Free" Bradford, and recorded a 19-song demo, Country Cousins, which attracted the attention of Kedar Massenburg. He set Badu up to record a duet of “Your Precious Love” with D'Angelo and eventually signed her to a record deal with Universal Records.

== Career ==
=== 1997–1999: Baduizm and Live ===
Baduizm, Badu's debut album, was released in early 1997. The album met with critical and commercial success, debuting at number two on the Billboard charts and number one on the U.S. Billboard Top R&B/Hip-Hop Albums. Baduizm's commercial and critical success helped establish Badu as one of the emerging neo soul genre's leading artists. Her particular style of singing drew many comparisons to Billie Holiday. Baduizm was certified three times platinum by the Recording Industry Association of America, Gold by the British Phonographic Industry and the Canadian Recording Industry Association.

The album produced four singles; the lead single "On & On" was released in December 1996, and reached number 12 on the U.S. Billboard Hot 100 charts and the UK Singles Charts, as well as making an appearance on the New Zealand charts. The album and lead single also gave Badu her first nomination and win at the Grammy Awards, where "On & On" won Best Female R&B Vocal Performance and the album won Best R&B Album.

Badu recorded her first live album, Live, while pregnant with Seven, and the release of the recording coincided with his birth. The album was released on November 18, 1997, and reached number four on the U.S. Billboard 200 and number one on the U.S. Billboard Top R&B/Hip-Hop Albums. The album was certified two times platinum by RIAA for shipments of over two million copies. The album's lead single, "Tyrone", was released in October 1997 and became another R&B hit single. "Tyrone", lyrically, is a song chiding a selfish, cheap, and inattentive boyfriend. Badu also collaborated with the Roots (who had previously handled production duties on a number of tracks on Baduizm) on their breakthrough 1999 release Things Fall Apart. She was featured on the song "You Got Me", by The Roots and American woman rapper Eve. Co-written by Jill Scott, the song peaked at 39 in the U.S. and 31 in the UK. The song went on to win The Roots and Badu a Grammy Award for Best Rap Performance by a Duo or Group in 1999.

=== 2000–2006: Mama's Gun and Worldwide Underground ===
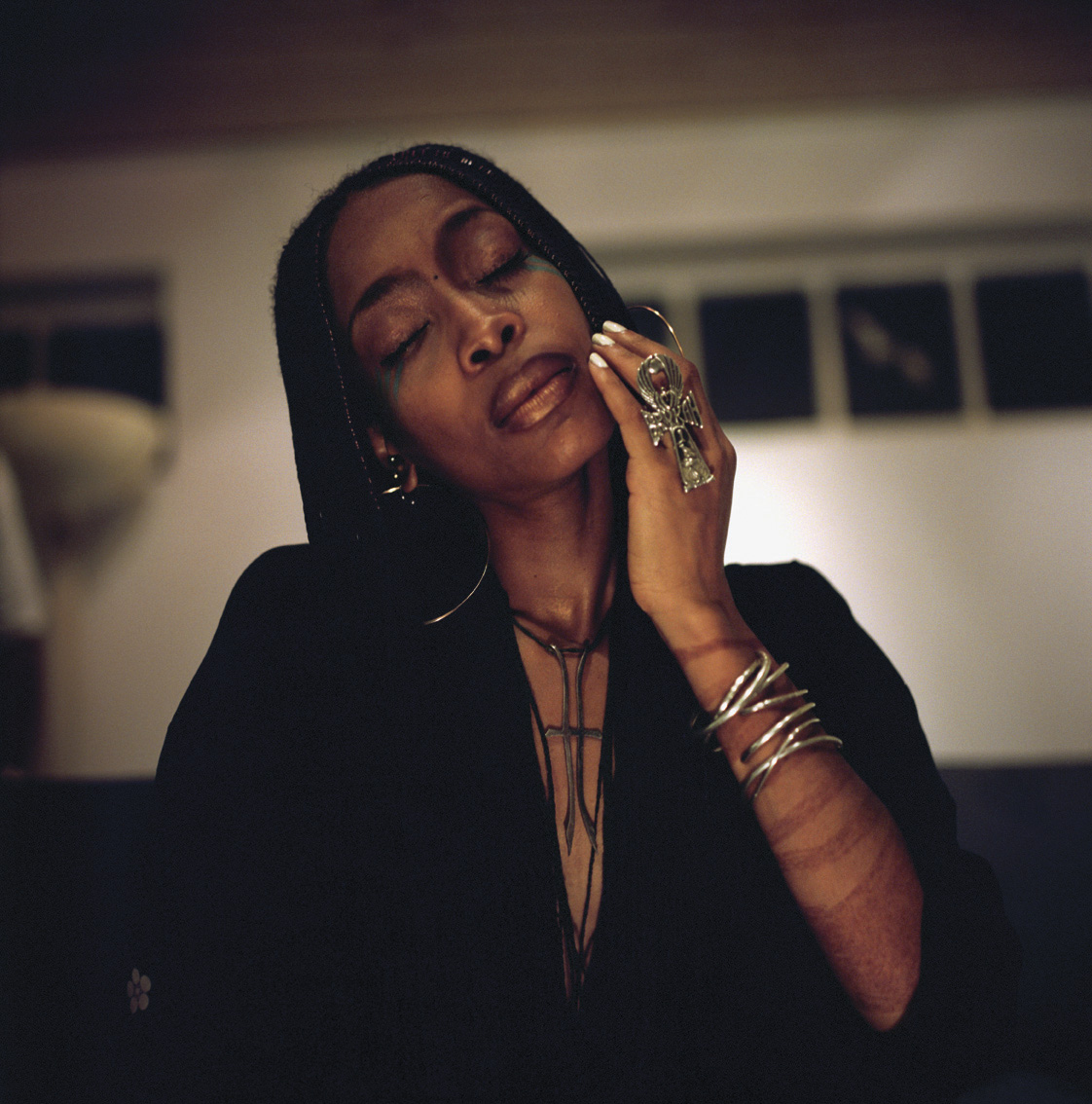
Badu backstage in Hamburg, Germany, in 2002

After taking some time off to raise her child, Badu returned in 2000 with Mama's Gun. The album was characterized as more organic in sound than her previous studio album, and primarily produced by the Soulquarians and noted bassist Pino Palladino. A remix of one of the album's songs, "Bag Lady", was issued as the first single and topped the R&B charts for seven weeks. The album was well-received, with the lyrical content winning notices from many publications. Reviewers found some of her lyrics hard to decipher on her initial releases. The album debuted as number three on the U.S. Billboard Top R&B/Hip-Hop Albums. Despite not charting as high as her first two albums, Mama's Gun was another platinum-selling success, and "Bag Lady" was nominated for a Grammy Award.

By 2000, Badu was in a romantic relationship with fellow Soulquarian Common. The two released "Love of My Life (An Ode to Hip-Hop)" as a collaboration on the Brown Sugar soundtrack. "Love of My Life" hit number 9 on the pop chart, topped the R&B listing, and in 2003 Badu was awarded her fourth Grammy Award for it. In 2001 Badu embarked on the Mama's Gun World Tour. The tour started in North America on February 10 in Cleveland, Ohio at the Allen Theatre. After the release of Mama's Gun and "Love of My Life", Badu suffered writer's block.

On September 16, 2003, she released her third studio album, Worldwide Underground. The album was more jam-oriented than any of her prior releases, and Badu said that the album was designed to be "one continuous groove." Upon its release Worldwide Underground met with some criticism for its loose, unconventional structure and songwriting, but the album received generally positive reviews from critics. Commercially the album fared well and debuted at number three on the U.S. Billboard 200 chart in the week of October 4, 2003, selling 143,561 copies in its first week. Ultimately spending 11 weeks on the Billboard 200, it also entered at number two on Billboard's Top R&B/Hip-Hop Albums and spent 30 weeks on the chart. By December 2003, the album had sold 394,000 copies domestically. On October 28, 2003, Worldwide Underground was certified gold in sales by the Recording Industry Association of America, following sales in excess of 500,000 copies in the United States. According to Nielsen SoundScan, the album has sold 609,000 copies in the United States.

Its first single, "Love of My Life (An Ode to Hip Hop)", peaked at number nine on the Billboard Hot 100 and at number one on the Hot R&B/Hip-Hop Songs chart. The second single "Danger" reached number 82 on the Hot 100 and number 27 on the Hot R&B/Hip-Hop Songs, while the third single "Back in the Day (Puff)" peaked at number 62 on the Hot R&B/Hip-Hop Songs chart. Badu received four further Grammy nominations for the album. She also contributed to Zap Mama's album Ancestry in Progress (2004), adding her vocals to the track "Bandy Bandy." Badu embarked on the "Worldwide Underground Tour" in 2004. The U.S. trek kicked off February 3 in New Orleans and ran through the winter and spring with supporting act Floetry joining the tour February 5 in Houston. The Roots made a special opening act appearance at the February 11 show in Los Angeles. Badu resumed the tour during the fall with additional dates in America and Europe.

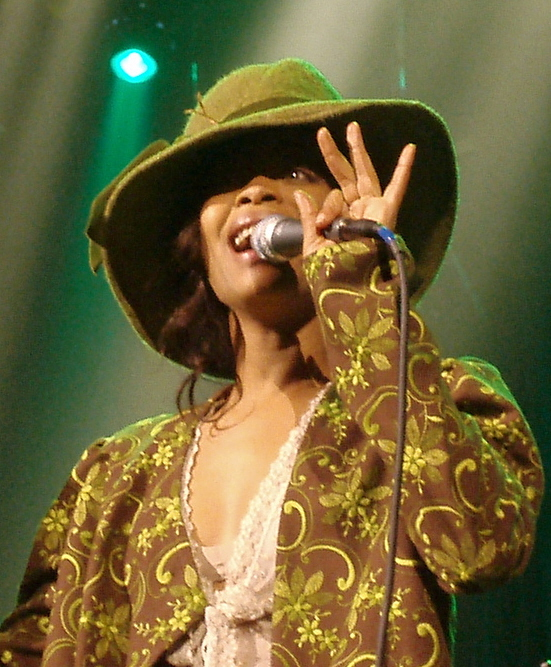
Badu in 2005

In 2005, she was a judge for the 4th Annual Independent Music Awards, to support independent artists' careers. Badu co-founded the Sugar Water Festival with Queen Latifah and Jill Scott. The trek played to amphitheaters and arenas in the United States during the summer of 2005 and 2006. It began in 2005 as an event to bring awareness to health issues to African-American women. British duo Floetry opened shows during the 2005 run. The festival was relaunched briefly in 2006 with Kelis opening the show and comedian Mo'Nique hosting the festival. 2006 was its final year. The festival had plans to expand into Europe and Asia, but this did not come to fruition. The Summer Tour was a concert tour in 2006 by Badu. The tour started on June 10, in Knoxville, TN, with three shows in the U.S., and resumed in July for several shows in Europe. Badu co-headlined on dates in August with Jill Scott and Queen Latifah at the Sugar Water Festival.

=== 2007–2009: New Amerykah Part One ===
After receiving her first computer as a Christmas gift, Badu began communicating with and receiving music from Questlove, Q-Tip and J Dilla, among others. She later began to use her laptop as a mini recording studio to construct various backing tracks for songs, which led to the album's primary recording sessions at Electric Lady Studios in New York City. In 2007 Badu was said to have three albums in the works for release during 2007 and 2008. "Honey", a new single produced by 9th Wonder, was leaked online in November 2007. The fourth studio album, New Amerykah Part One, was released by Universal Motown Records, in the United States on February 26, 2008, Badu's 37th birthday. It was released in European countries on February 29, in Australia and the United Kingdom on March 3, and in Japan on March 12. Both Japanese and Australian editions contain the bonus track "Real Thang". The album's digital release on the iTunes Store featured the song's "Tumbling Dice Remix" as a bonus track. New Amerykah Part One was also released as a double vinyl LP on March 11, and on USB stick format.

The album's lead single, "Honey", was released on December 11, 2007. It reached number 88 on the US Billboard Hot 100, on which it spent three weeks. The song also charted at number 22 and spent 17 weeks on the Hot R&B/Hip-Hop Songs. Upon release New Amerykah Part One (4th World War) received universal acclaim from critics. In the United States, the album debuted at number two on the Billboard 200 chart, selling 125,000 copies in its first week. It was Badu's best opening week since her debut album Baduizm in 1997. It also entered at number two on the Billboard Top R&B/Hip-Hop Albums. According to Nielsen Soundscan, New Amerykah Part One (4th World War) sold 359,000 copies in the United States by early 2010.

Erykah Badu performed at the 10th annual Voodoo Experience in New Orleans the weekend before Halloween 2008. In the United Kingdom, the album charted at number 55 on the UK Albums Chart, on which it spent one week. In France, it debuted at number 49 and spent 11 weeks on the French Albums Chart. In Switzerland, it debuted at number 10 and spent six weeks on the Swiss Albums Top 100. In the Netherlands, the album entered at number 25 and spent seven weeks on the Mega Album Top 100. In Poland, it reached number nine and spent eight weeks on the Polish Albums Chart. The album's highest international charting was number five in Sweden, where it charted for seven weeks.

During 2008 and 2009, Badu embarked on two world tours. The Vortex Tour (2008) was a tour in support of New Amerykah Part One. The U.S. tour kicked off May 4 in Detroit, MI, ending on June 15 in Albuquerque, NM. The second leg of tour reached Europe on June 25, in Copenhagen, Denmark. Badu toured across Europe playing shows that included an itinerary for the month of July. Several more shows were added throughout August in the U.S. The Jam Tour was a summer music concert tour in 2009. The tour started in March; Badu played dates across North America twice and Europe, and the tour ended in Dallas, Texas on October 16. During the second U.S. leg, Badu was featured as a special guest co-headliner on hip-hop artist Mos Def's "Ecstatic Tour" on select September dates.

=== 2010–2014: New Amerykah Part Two and Window Seat controversy ===
"New Amerykah Part Two (Return of the Ankh)", Badu's fifth studio album, was released March 30, 2010, on Universal Motown in the United States. It was released in Japan on April 14, 2010. Upon release the album was met with general acclaim from critics. The album debuted at number four on the U.S. Billboard 200 chart, selling 110,000 copies in its first week. It also entered at number two on Billboard's R&B/Hip-Hop Albums chart. In the United Kingdom, New Amerykah Part Two (Return of the Ankh) debuted at number 56 on the UK Albums Chart and at number nine on the R&B Albums Chart. In Canada, the album debuted at number 36 on the Top 100 and at number five on the R&B Top 50 chart. New Amerykah Part Two achieved moderate chart success in international markets, peaking within the top 50 in several countries, including Norway, Poland, Switzerland, Sweden, and Denmark.

During March 2010, Badu promoted the album through television performances on Late Night with Jimmy Fallon, The Wendy Williams Show, Chelsea Lately, Jimmy Kimmel Live!, and Good Day New York. She also appeared on the April issue cover of EQ magazine and was featured in issues of Nylon, Playboy, Rolling Stone, Entertainment Weekly, Time Out New York, Spin, Vibe, Paste, and People, among others. Badu performed at a surprise midnight show on March 31, 2010, at the El Rey Theatre in Los Angeles.

The internet-only promotional single "Jump up in the Air (Stay There)", featuring Lil Wayne and Bilal, was released on Badu's official website in January 2010. RC Williams, Badu's musical director, said that a music video for the track was shot in Dallas. The album's first official single, "Window Seat", was released by Badu through a downloadable link on her Twitter page. The song peaked at number 16 on Billboard R&B/Hip-Hop Songs chart. The album's second single, "Turn Me Away (Get MuNNY)", was released March 24, 2010, by Badu as a free download online. It spent three weeks on the R&B/Hip-Hop Songs chart, peaking at number 87. On Wednesday, February 9, 2011, Vimeo.com released a new video for "Gone Baby, Don't Be Long", directed by Flying Lotus. The video was tweeted by Badu herself and friend and associated music act Questlove from the Roots.

On March 13, 2010, Badu filmed the video for her song "Window Seat", at Dealey Plaza in Dallas, Texas, the site of the assassination of President John F. Kennedy. She wrote on her Twitter feed that the video "was shot guerrilla style, no crew, 1 take, no closed set, no warning, 2 min., Downtown Dallas, then ran like hell." The team did not acquire permission or permits from the city. In the video, Badu shed her clothes as she walked along a Dallas sidewalk until she was nude at the site where Kennedy was shot. A shot rang out as the song ended, Badu's head jerked back, and she fell to the ground. Children with their families could be seen nearby as Badu stripped. When asked about stripping nude in the presence of minors, Badu said, "I didn't think about them until I saw them, and in my mind I tried to telepathically communicate my good intent to them. That's all I could do, and I hoped they wouldn't be traumatized."

On April 2, 2010, Badu was charged with disorderly conduct as a result of this nudity. Though Badu's performance had an estimated hundreds of eyewitnesses, none complained to police at the time of the incident. After the video gained attention online, the Dallas Police Department actively sought witnesses and complainants. Sgt. Warren Mitchell said the decision to cite Badu for a misdemeanor punishable by a fine of up to $500 came after witness Ida Espinosa, 32, of Vernon, offered a sworn statement to police Thursday, April 1. Espinosa declined to comment to The Associated Press. On April 28, 2010, Badu pleaded not guilty rather than paying the fee by mail. On August 13, she paid the $500 ticket and began a term of six months' probation.

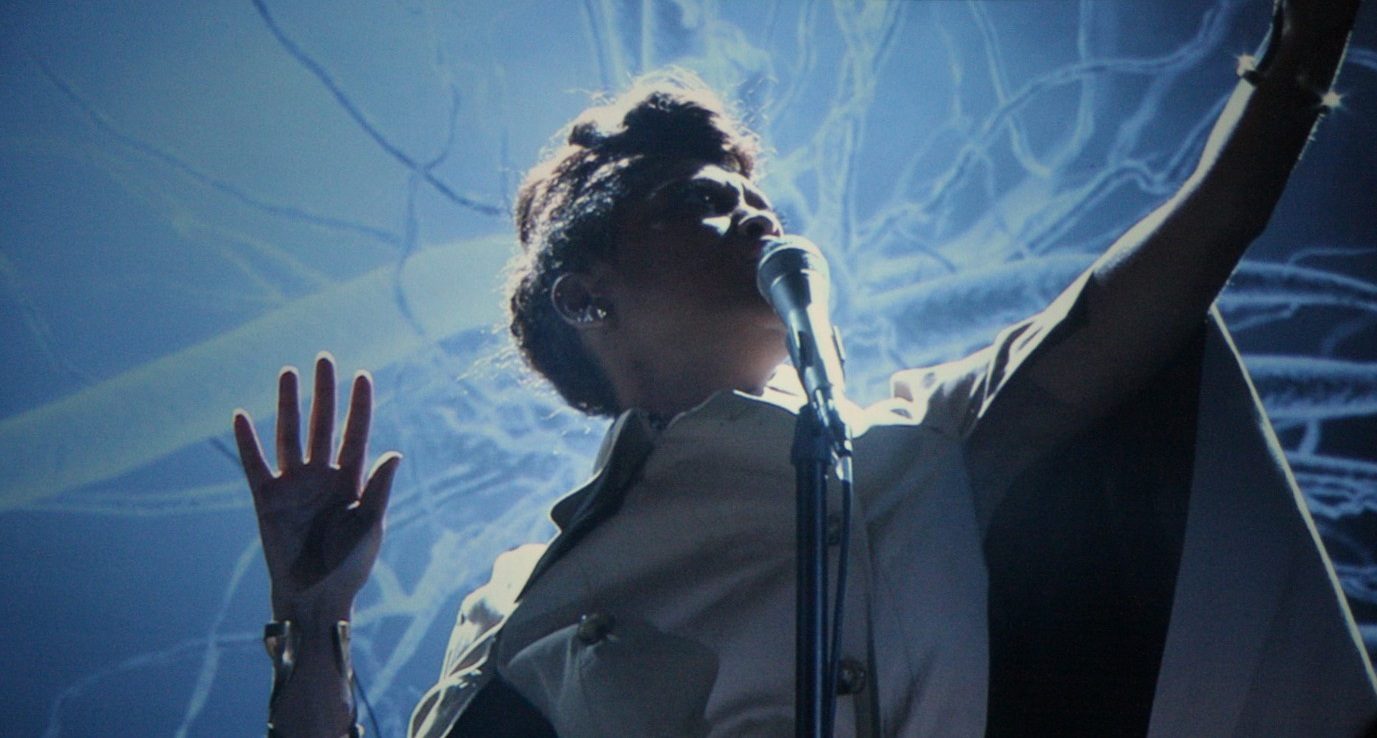
Badu at Umbria Jazz in 2012

Badu said on The Wanda Sykes Show on April 3, 2010, that it was not her intention to insult the memory of the late President John F. Kennedy (JFK): "My point was grossly misunderstood all over America. JFK is one of my heroes, one of the nation's heroes. John F. Kennedy was a revolutionary; he was not afraid to butt heads with America, and I was not afraid to show America my butt-naked truth." Coodie and Chike, directors of the "Window Seat" video, said they had bail money ready during filming in case Badu was arrested. Badu said the video was a protest against "groupthink" and was inspired by Matt and Kim's music video "Lessons Learned." Badu has also said she has "no regrets".

In 2011, Badu appeared on Flying Lotus's fourth album, Until the Quiet Comes. Badu appeared on the debut album by the supergroup Rocket Juice & the Moon, which was released in March 2012 and the album Black Radio by Robert Glasper. In 2013, Badu appeared on "Treehome95" from Tyler, The Creator's third studio album, Wolf as well as on the song "Heaven for the Sinner" from Bonobo's album The North Borders. Badu featured on Janelle Monáe's first single from her second studio album, The Electric Lady, "Q.U.E.E.N." The song premiered on SoundCloud and was made available for download purchase at the iTunes Store on April 23, 2013. The song peaked at 47 on the U.S. Billboard Hot R&B/Hip-Hop Songs charts.

=== 2015–2019: Touring and mixtapes ===
In May 2013, Badu announced she was writing her next project, but not placing a time constraint on it. In July 2014, Badu revealed she was still working on the album and had been recording in April in Africa where she was "laying down drum tracks". Badu also said that prior to her trip to Africa she would have meetings with her record label to set a deadline for the album. Later that year Badu expanded on the album, stating she was working with producer Flying Lotus, who she met via MySpace years ago; they later met in L.A. at guitarist Steve Wilson's house.

In 2015, Badu appeared on "Rememory", a song from Donnie Trumpet & The Social Experiment's album Surf. In July 2015, Badu released a free mixtape of her favorite recordings, describing the set as "carefully and lovingly selected high frequency tones for the soul." The mixtape features mostly vintage funk, soul and jazz songs. On March 26, 2015, Erykah Badu performed at The Bomb Factory in her hometown, Dallas, Texas, for the Deep Ellum venue's grand opening. The sold-out show also featured fellow Dallas native, singer-songwriter Sarah Jaffe.

In early October, Badu released a remix of Drake's single "Hotline Bling", and later released a mixtape, But You Caint Use My Phone, on November 27, 2015, making it available for digital download and streaming exclusively through Apple Music. After one week of exclusive release on iTunes, But You Caint Use My Phone was released to other digital retailers and streaming services on December 4, 2015. The mixtape was released without the knowledge of her label Universal, due to Badu sending the record straight to iTunes. It also marked Badu's first release under her own record label, Control Freaq. But You Caint Use My Phone received generally positive reviews from critics and debuted at number 14 on the Billboard 200, selling 35,000 equivalent album units in its first week. Badu also hosted the 2015, 2016 and the 2017 Soul Train Music Awards.

Within two months of the release of But You Caint Use My Phone in 2016, Badu announced a follow-up mixtape titled This $hit Too Easy was to be released; however, this mixtape hasn't surfaced. The same year, Badu released new three tracks on SoundCloud, including Trill Friends, Thru It All and Come See Badu. On January 24, 2018, she announced a release of a new mixtape, but like the aforementioned mixtape, remains unreleased. In a publication on Vulture, Badu announced she was slowly making progress on her sixth studio album.

Badu held her annual "Still Boomin'" sold-out birthday bash concert at The Bomb Factory on February 26, 2016, marking her second performance at the venue since its grand opening 11 months earlier. The event was hosted by Badu's close friend Dave Chappelle and featured a surprise appearance by André 3000 of the duo Outkast. Badu enlisted Dallas' local hip hop acts Zach Witness and Cameron McCloud as her supporting acts, after collaborating with Witness earlier that year at his home studio. In 2016, Badu also starred as Turquoise in the film The Land. For the film, Badu also released the title track The Land, which featured rapper Nas.

On August 15, 2018, the NPR video series Tiny Desk Concerts, released a new episode featuring Erykah Badu and her band performing live. The same day, NPR released the What's Good with Stretch & Bobbito podcast episode featuring a fresh interview with Erykah Badu where she spoke of being a certified Doula, her inherited sense of humor from her mother, stand-up comedy, her avoidance of print interviews after her 2008 experience being misquoted, and Prince. On November 7, while hosting NTS series Sound of Color Badu debuted a studio recording of a previously unreleased and untitled song that has been dubbed Money Can't Buy Me Love by fans.

On June 2, 2019, Badu teased the release of a new song which she performed live at Barcelona's Primavera Sound Festival, tentatively titled The Work (The Way She Sees). The following day on June 3, 2019, Badu released a new single titled Tempted, a cover of Tempted by Squeeze in collaboration with instrumentalist James Poyser. This song marks her first official single since Phone Down in 2015. In September, Badu confirmed her plans to release her sixth studio album "soon" via a comment to a fan on Instagram.

=== 2020–present: Contributions and features ===
Badu performing as a surprise appearance on the Ye Live Concert Tour at AT&T Stadium in 2026.

In May 2020, she featured on a single titled "Beehoove" alongside D'Angelo on Slingbaum's vinyl-only release debut studio album, Slingbaum One. On June 19, 2020, Badu featured on the song "Lowkey" by singer Teyana Taylor. In August 2020, Badu contributed to the live streamed recording of Bilal's EP Voyage-19, created remotely during the COVID-19 lockdowns. It was released the following month with proceeds from its sales going to participating musicians in financial hardship from the pandemic. In December 2022, she featured on a track titled "Yun" on RM's debut studio album Indigo.

In March 2025, during an interview with Billboard, Badu revealed she was working on a new studio album—her first in 15 years—slated to be produced solely by The Alchemist. It will be released through Badu's independent label Control FREAQ Records. That same year, she appeared in the documentary Lilith Fair: Building a Mystery – The Untold Story, which reflects on the legacy of the all-female music festival. In August 2026, Badu officially announced her debut collaborative album with The Alchemist, Before the World Blows. The album was released on August 28, 2026 by Control Freaq/Young. The album was favourably received; NRC awarded it four stars out of five, describing the record as an equal collaboration rather than a nostalgic return, and noting guest contributions from Steve Lacy, Thundercat and Kamasi Washington. Earlier that year, on Koningsdag, Badu had made an unannounced appearance during The Alchemist's DJ set in Amsterdam's Westerpark.

== Musical style ==
Badu's work draws from R&B, 1970s soul, and 1980s hip-hop, and became associated with the neo soul subgenre in the 1990s along with artists like D'Angelo. For her musical sensibilities, she has often been compared to jazz singer Billie Holiday. The Los Angeles Times described Badu as an experimental R&B singer. Her work explores contemporary forms of soul and hip-hop. Mama's Gun (2000) is a neo soul album, that incorporates funk, soul, and jazz styles. The album has been viewed by critics as a women's companion to neo soul artist D'Angelo's second album Voodoo (2000), which features a similar musical style and direction. Worldwide Underground (2003) followed in the same vein as Badu's previous efforts: the album is neo-soul and prominently incorporates hip-hop and funk elements, while also featuring an unconventional musical structure. New Amerykah Part One (2008) has a dense stylistic amalgam that primarily incorporates funk, soul, and hip-hop genres, as well as jazz and electronica. In contrast to its predecessor, which was digitally produced and political in tone, New Amerykah Part Two (2010) incorporates sampling and live instrumentation.

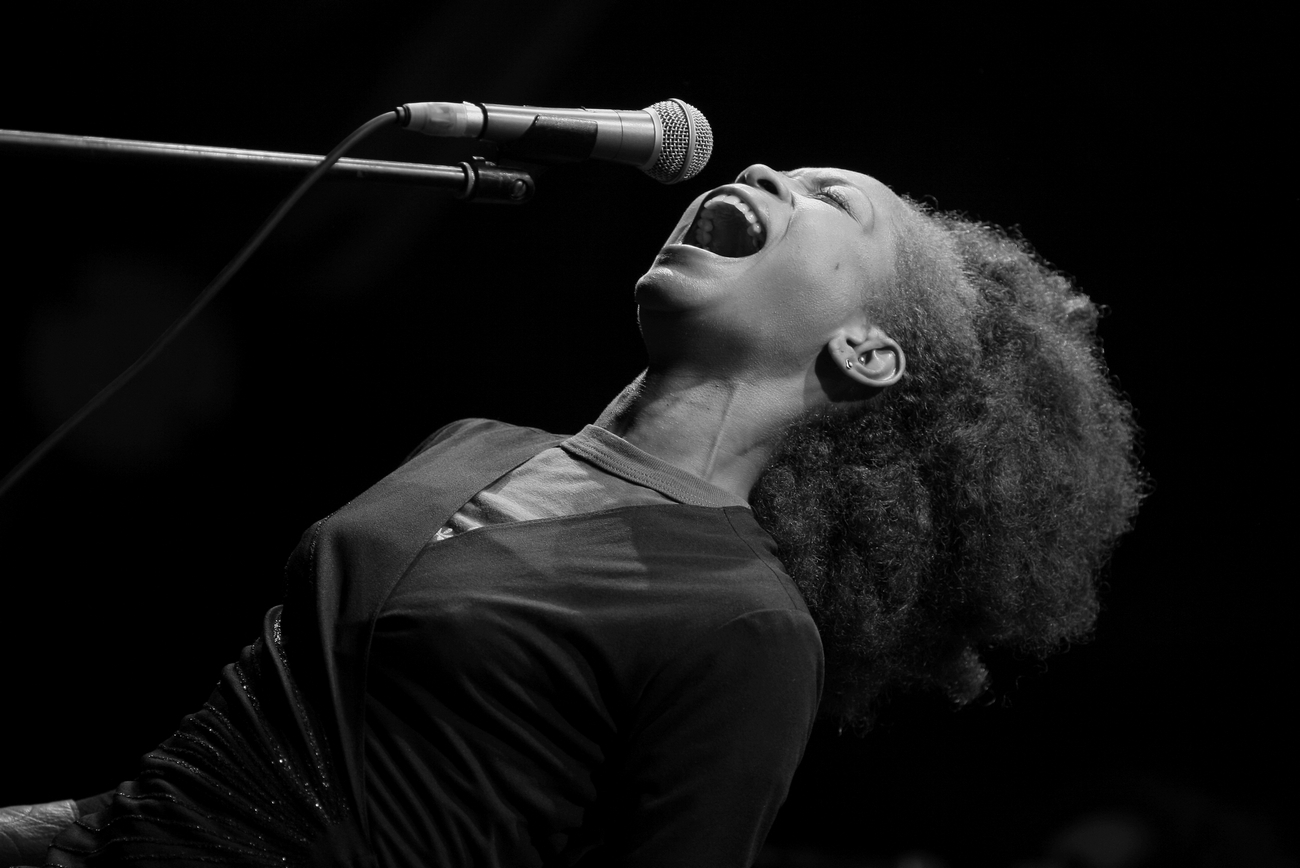
Badu performing in Bruges, Belgium, in 2006

The majority of Badu's music is greatly influenced by her beliefs of the Nation of Gods and Earths and her exploration of her African heritage. The songs in her album Baduizm express her personal take on life. Her philosophy is influenced by African ideology, African-centered and Five Percent theologies, and Southern African-American folk traditions. Mama's Gun has a confessional lyrical theme, covering themes of insecurity, social issues, and personal relationships. Worldwide Underground contains minimalist songwriting concerning hip-hop culture, love, ghetto life, and gang culture. New Amerykah Part One is an esoteric concept album with sociopolitical themes and mostly downbeat subject matter, featuring more impersonal topics and social commentary than on Badu's previous work. Its subject matter deals with social concerns and struggles within the African-American community, exploring topics such as institutional racism, religion, poverty, urban violence, the abuse of power, complacency, cultural identity, drug addiction, and nihilism. Badu has said that the album discusses "religion, [...] poor families, the undermining of the working class, the so-called minority". Lyrically, New Amerykah Part Two is more personal than its predecessor, focusing on themes of romance and relationships. Badu has described its sound as "very analog".

Badu is inspired by "stimulating" experiences. She was also significantly influenced by her music teacher Ms. Goodman, who encouraged her to take up music. Badu also takes influence from her grandmother and her religious views, which Badu described as a lesson saying "When you do it, it gotta be real, or that's not it."

== Accolades ==
In 1997, Badu received twenty nominations and won three, Favorite Female Solo Single for "On & On", Favorite Female Solo Album for Baduizm and Best R&B/Soul or Rap Song of the Year for "On & On" at the Soul Train Lady of Soul Awards. In 1998, Badu received fourteen nominations and won eight, including Favorite R&B/Soul or Rap New Artist at the American Music Awards; Best Female R&B Vocal Performance for "On & On" and Best R&B Album for Baduizm at the Grammy Awards; Outstanding New Artist and Outstanding Female Artist at the NAACP Image Awards; Favorite Female Soul/R&B Single for "On & On", Favorite Female Soul/R&B Album for Baduizm and Favorite New R&B/Soul or Rap New Artist for "On & On" at the Soul Train Music Awards.

In 2000, Badu received two nominations and won one, Best Rap Performance by a Duo or Group at the Grammy Awards. In 2003, Badu received twelve nominations and won two, including Video of the Year for "Love of My Life (An Ode to Hip-Hop)" at the BET Awards and Best Urban/Alternative Performance for "Love of My Life (An Ode to Hip-Hop)" at the Grammy Awards. In 2008, Badu received eleven nominations and won two, including Best Director for "Honey" at the BET Awards and Best Direction in a Video for "Honey" at the MTV Video Music Awards. Overall, Badu has won 16 awards from 59 nominations.

== Legacy ==
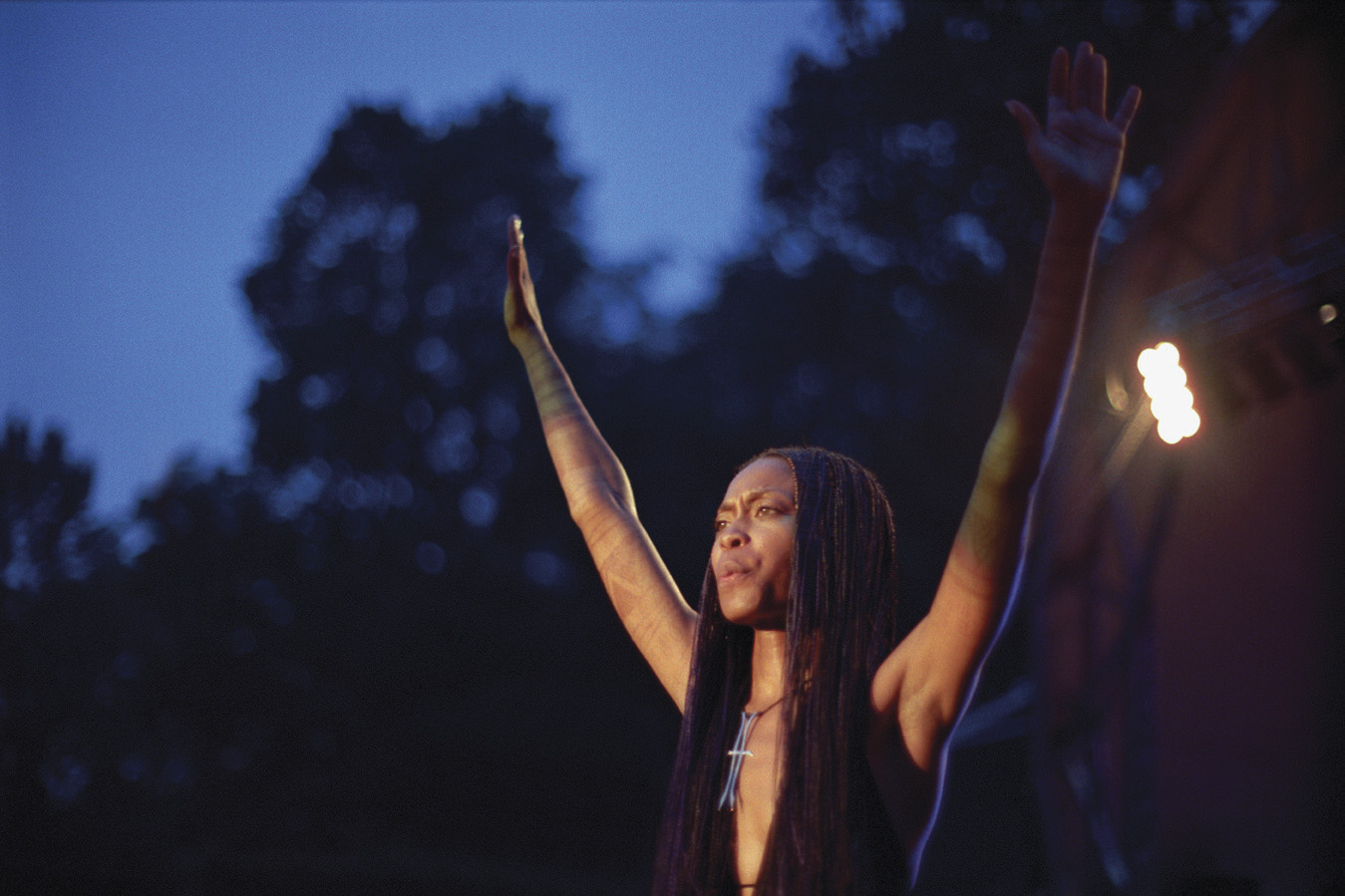
Badu has been dubbed "the first lady of neo-soul" and "the queen of neo-soul".

Although she disputes the term, Erykah Badu has been dubbed "the first lady of neo-soul" and "the queen of neo-soul". Baduizm's commercial and critical success earned Erykah Badu popularity at the time and helped establish her as one of the emerging neo soul genre's leading artists. Along with D'Angelo's Brown Sugar (1995) and Maxwell's Urban Hang Suite (1996), the album has been recognized by music writers for beginning neo soul's popularity and helping the genre obtain commercial visibility at the time.

Erykah Badu's song "Master Teacher" popularized the expression stay woke in the meaning of to continue to be "self-aware, questioning the dominant paradigm and striving for something better." In 2023, Rolling Stone ranked Badu at number 115 on its list of the 200 Greatest Singers of All Time.

== Other ventures ==
Badu has also ventured into acting. She made her debut as a supporting role in the 1998 film Blues Brothers 2000, playing Queen Mousette. The film gained mostly mixed to negative reviews from film critics and was considered a commercial failure. Badu made her second appearances in The Cider House Rules (1999), where she played the character of Rose Rose. The film fared well both critically and commercially, with Badu receiving numerous awards and nominations including a win at the 2000 Black Reel Awards for best supporting actress as well as nominations for Screen Actors Guild Awards and Satellite Awards.

In 2004, Badu returned to the screen playing Lady/Bernadette in House of D. Badu also had small roles in Before the Music Dies (2005), and Dave Chappelle's Block Party (2006). In 2008, she was reported to have a leading role alongside Mos Def in the upcoming indie film, Bobby Zero; the movie was not released. She also appeared in scenes of the music video of Miko Marks' 2006 recording "Mama" and Common's video for "The Light," as well as making a special appearance on the sitcom Girlfriends.

In 2006, Badu was certified as a doula. She supported the pregnancies of two mothers a year from 2001 to 2023. She has also worked as an end-of-life doula.

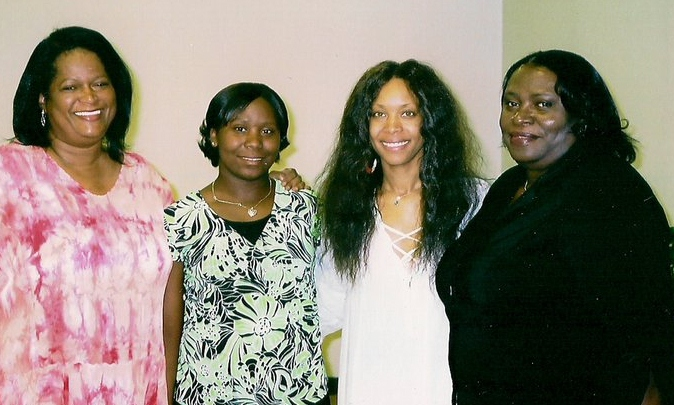
Badu alongside Brenda Cherry, Creola and Shaquanda Cotton at the Africa Care Academy 10th Annual Educational Awards Banquet in Dallas, Texas

In 2008, Badu became the face of fashion designer Tom Ford White Patchouli fragrance. Ford, longtime friends with Badu, considered her the best choice for the campaign. "I have always considered her a true beauty ... she just fits", says Ford. In late December 2013, it was announced that Badu would become the face of Givenchy's 2014 Spring collection. Badu made her New York Fashion Week debut alongside designer Kerby Jean-Raymond in 2016, styling for his Pyer Moss collection titled "Double Bind." Erykah Badu and Kerby Jean-Raymond titled this collection after Gregory Bateson's idea Double bind. Badu called this collection a "movement" against issues including depression, racism, and hatred.

Badu also remains an activist in her hometown of South Dallas. In Nation19 Magazine Badu talked about why she set up her own charity organization, titled Beautiful Love Incorporated Non Profit Development (B.L.I.N.D. 501c3). The charity was established in 1997 and aims to provide "community-driven development for inner-city youth" through the use of music, dance, theater and visual arts. The organization's first endeavor was to establish a base of operations. Erykah chose to renovate and reopen the Black Forest Theater in South Dallas. The Black Forest serves as a community center, bringing people together in order to celebrate the art and culture of south Dallas. The Black Forest's stage is equipped for shows and performances, and has hosted both free and fundraising concerts by music artists including Prince, Snoop Dogg, Jill Scott, Musiq Soulchild, Dead Prez, Talib Kweli and Questlove from The Roots. All of the artists volunteered their time to help with the charity. As an outreach for B.L.I.N.D., Erykah traveled to Africa in February 2003, where she worked with children affected by AIDS and poverty. Badu has also received the Key to the City of Dallas and been recognized in Philanthropy Magazine for her efforts in community service.

On February 20, 2020, Badu opened an online store named Badu World Market. Badu World Market features bespoke clothing, apothecary goods, musical merchandise, clothing accessories, and more. She also began selling a line of incense; one scent is named "Badu Pussy" because Badu claimed she "took lots of pairs of [her] panties, cut them up into little pieces and burned them."

Badu launched her own cannabis line, That Badu, in partnership with the Cookies cannabis brand in 2023. She also founded a company Apple Trees in 2020 that sells cannabis-related accessories.

== Personal life ==
In 1995, Badu met rapper André 3000 of OutKast at a nightclub in New York City and subsequently began dating. She gave birth to their son, her first child, Seven Sirius Benjamin, on November 18, 1997. Their relationship ended in late 1998. In late 2000, OutKast released the song "Ms. Jackson", which was inspired by André 3000's then-relationship with Badu and her mother. The song reached number one on Billboard Hot 100 and would go on to win a Grammy Award.

On July 5, 2004, Badu gave birth to her second child, her daughter Puma Sabti Curry; Puma's father is rapper The D.O.C. The two separated sometime in 2007-2008 after Dr. Dre contacted D.O.C. to work on Dre's next album, prompting D.O.C. to depart for Los Angeles. On February 1, 2009, Badu gave birth to her third child, a girl named Mars Merkaba Thedford, with her boyfriend of five years, rapper Jay Electronica.

Badu became a vegan in 2006: "Vegan food is soul food in its truest form. Soul food means to feed the soul. And to me, your soul is your intent. If your intent is pure, you are pure." Badu splits her time between her hometown and Fort Greene, New York.

For the 2014 Okayplayer platform and web television OkayAfrica TV, Badu had her DNA tested, and genealogists researched her family ancestry. It was revealed that Badu's mitochondrial DNA traced to the Bamileke people of Cameroon in Central Africa.

== Discography ==
- Baduizm (1997)
- Mama's Gun (2000)
- Worldwide Underground (2003)
- New Amerykah Part One (4th World War) (2008)
- New Amerykah Part Two (Return of the Ankh) (2010)
- Before the World Blows (with the Alchemist) (2026)

== Tours ==
- Baduizm World Tour (1997–98)
- Mama's Gun World Tour (2001)
- Frustrated Artist Tour (2003)
- Worldwide Underground Tour (2004)
- Sugar Water Festival (2005)
- Summer Tour (2006)
- Dave Chappelle/Badu tour (2007)
- The Vortex World Tour (2008)
- Jam Tour (2009)
- Out My Mind, Just in Time World Tour (2010)
- Live from Badubotron Tour (2021–22)
- Unfollow Me Tour (2023)
- Abi & Alan Tour with The Alchemist (August 2025)
- Mama's Gun '25: The Return of Automatic Slim Tour (2025)
- Live Tour with The Alchemist, De La Soul & Smino (2026)

== Filmography ==
=== Television ===
Year	Title	Role	Notes
1997	All That	Herself	Season 3, Episode 21
1997	Sesame Street	Herself	Episode: "Telly's Greetings and Goodbyes & Snuffleupagus"
1997	One Life to Live	Herself	Two episodes – musical guest
1997	The Chris Rock Show	Herself	Season 1, Episode 5 – musical guest
1997	Later... with Jools Holland	Herself	Series 9, Episode 6 – musical guest
1997	MTV Unplugged	Herself	Musical guest
1997	Planet Groove	Herself	Musical guest
1997	New York Undercover	Herself	Season 3, Episode 21 – musical guest
1997, 2012	Late Show with David Letterman	Herself	Musical guest
2002	The Tonight Show with Jay Leno	Herself	Musical guest
2002	Def Poetry Jam	Herself	Season 2, Episode 2 – guest poet
2004	Kid's Lives... Starring Erykah Badu	Herself	Video short; host
2004	Chappelle's Show	Herself	Episode: "Music Jump-Off Special"
2005	Tavis Smiley	Herself	
2005	The Late Late Show with Craig Ferguson	Herself	Episode 65
2006	September in Brooklyn: The Making of 'Block Party'	Herself	Documentary short
2008	Ellen	Herself	
2009, 2013	Yo Gabba Gabba!	Herself	2 episodes
2009	The Brian McKnight Show	Herself	
2010	The Mo'Nique Show	Herself	
2010	The Wanda Sykes Show	Herself	Season 1, Episode 19 – musical guest
2010	Jimmy Kimmel Live!	Herself	
2010	The Wendy Williams Show	Herself	
2010	Chelsea Lately	Herself	Musical guest
2011	Building the 'House of D'	Herself	Video short
2012	Independent Lens	Herself	Season 13, Episode 14 – documentary series
2013	Real Husbands of Hollywood	Herself	Season 2, Episode 10
2013	Soul Power	Herself	1 episode
2014–15	Black Dynamite	Rita Marley, Fatback Taffy, Crow	3 episodes
2015	Hand of God	April	
2016–17	Legends of Chamberlain Heights	Various characters	
2017	Desus & Mero	Herself	

=== Films ===
Year	Title	Role	Notes
1998	Blues Brothers 2000	Queen Moussette	
1999	The Cider House Rules	Rose Rose	Nominated — Screen Actors Guild Award for Outstanding Performance by a Cast in a Motion Picture
2001	Erykah Badu Live	Herself	Documentary
2002	Stars: An Oscars Party	Herself	Documentary
2003	Dragon Tales Let's Start a Band	Herself	
2004	House of D	Lady / Bernadette	
2006	Before the Music Dies	Herself	Music documentary
2006	Dave Chappelle's Block Party	Herself	Music documentary
2009	Say My Name	Herself	Documentary
2010	Teenage Paparazzo	Herself	Documentary, uncredited
2012	Re:Generation Music Project	Herself	Documentary
2012	Diary of a Decade: The Story of a Movement	Herself	Documentary
2013	They Die by Dawn	Stagecoach Mary	Short
2014	What Difference Does It Make? A Film About Making Music	Herself	Music documentary
2016	The Land	Turquoise	
2019	What Men Want	Sister	
2024	The Piano Lesson	Lucille	
2025	Lilith Fair: Building a Mystery – The Untold Story	Herself	Documentary film

== See also ==
- Neo soul
- Honorific nicknames in popular music
