= Miles Marshall Lewis =

American critic and journalist

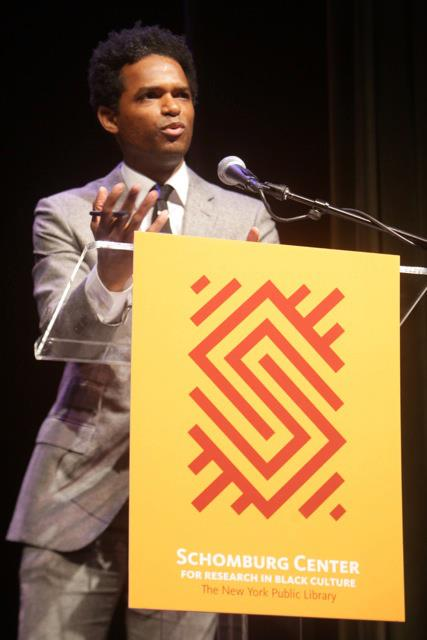
- Lewis lecturing at the Schomburg Center for Research in Black Culture, 2013.
- Born: December 18, 1970 (age 55); New York City, U.S.
- Occupations: Writer; editor; essayist; music journalist
- Writing career
- Period: 2004–present
- Notable works: Promise That You Will Sing About Me: The Power and Poetry of Kendrick Lamar (2021)
- Website: mmlunlimited.com

Miles Marshall Lewis (born December 18, 1970) is an American pop culture critic, essayist, literary editor, fiction writer, and music journalist. He graduated from Morehouse College in 1993.

== Career ==
Lewis was born in The Bronx, New York, at the beginning of hip hop culture in the early 1970s. He expatriated from the United States to Paris, France during 2004 in response to the Iraq War. His debut essay collection, Scars of the Soul Are Why Kids Wear Bandages When They Don't Have Bruises (2004) – a book described as "an observant and urbane B-boy's rites of passage" – established Lewis as a prose stylist observing American culture in a style directly influenced by Joan Didion, mixing personal reflection with social analysis and humor.

Lewis's second book, There's a Riot Goin' On (2006), deals with the making of the seminal 1971 album of the same name by Sly and the Family Stone, and the death of the 1960s counterculture. His third, Promise That You Will Sing About Me: The Power and Poetry of Kendrick Lamar (2021), is a cultural biography of Kendrick Lamar. Lewis was also the founder and editor of the defunct literary journal Bronx Biannual.

In 2007, Lewis launched Furthermucker.com, where he blogged about the arts, pop culture, hip-hop culture, and his experiences as an African American expatriate in 21st-century Paris. He is currently the acting Cultural Historian of The Hip Hop Museum in The Bronx, New York.

== Family ==
He and his French wife Christine Herelle-Lewis live together in New York City. They have two sons.
