= Next Lifetime =

Single by Erykah Badu

from the album Baduizm
- A-side: "On & On"
- Released: June 2, 1997
- Recorded: 1996
- Studio: Battery (New York)
- Genre: R&B; neo soul
- Length: 6:27
- Label: Kedar; Universal
- Songwriters: Erykah Badu; Anthony Scott
- Producer: Tone the Backbone

Erykah Badu singles chronology
| "On & On" (1997) | "Next Lifetime" (1997) | "Otherside of the Game" (1997) |

Music video
- "Next Lifetime" on YouTube

"Next Lifetime" is a song recorded by American singer Erykah Badu for her debut studio album Baduizm (1997). It was written by Badu and Anthony Scott. A mid-tempo ballad, the song describes being in a relationship but longing for another man. At the start of the song, Badu is heard talking to a man about how they can't be together even though they both have feelings for one another.

== Music video ==
The accompanying music video for "Next Lifetime" starts with the title "a story by Erykah Badu". It then shows Badu and the man she longs for in three different time frames–or "lifetimes"–including "Motherland, 1637 A.D.", "The Movement, 1968" and "Motherland, 3037". Pete Rock, Method Man and Badu's then-boyfriend André 3000 all appeared in the video. The video was directed by Troy Smith.

== Track listings and formats ==
UK 12-inch vinyl

1. "Next Lifetime" (album version) – 6:30
2. "Next Lifetime" (Linslee Remix) – 4:45
3. "Next Lifetime" (live) – 10:57
4. "Next Lifetime" (radio edit) – 4:15
5. "Next Lifetime" (instrumental) – 6:30

UK cassette and European CD single

1. "Next Lifetime" (radio edit) – 4:15
2. "Next Lifetime" (Linslee Remix) – 4:45

UK maxi CD single

1. "Next Lifetime" (radio edit) – 4:15
2. "Next Lifetime" (album version) – 6:30
3. "Next Lifetime" (Linslee Remix) – 4:45
4. "Next Lifetime" (live) – 10:57
5. "Next Lifetime" (instrumental) – 6:30

Japanese maxi CD single

1. "Next Lifetime" (album version) – 6:30
2. "Next Lifetime" (radio edit) – 4:15
3. "Next Lifetime" (instrumental) – 6:30
4. "On & On" (dance mix) – 3:50

== Charts ==
Weekly chart performance for "Next Lifetime"
| Chart (1997) | Peak position |
|---|---|
| Netherlands (Single Top 100) | 100 |
| New Zealand (Recorded Music NZ) | 40 |
| Scotland Singles (OCC) | 71 |
| UK Singles (OCC) | 30 |
| UK Dance (OCC) | 17 |
| UK Hip Hop/R&B (OCC) | 5 |
| US Radio Songs (Billboard) | 61 |
| US Adult R&B Songs (Billboard) | 1 |
| US R&B/Hip-Hop Airplay (Billboard) | 1 |

== Release history ==
Release dates and formats for "Next Lifetime"
| Region | Date | Format(s) | Label(s) | Ref. |
|---|---|---|---|---|
| United Kingdom | June 2, 1997 | 12-inch vinyl; cassette; maxi CD | Kedar; Universal | |
| Japan | June 21, 1997 | Maxi CD (Note: In Japan, "Next Lifetime" was released as a double A-side single with "On & On".) | MCA | |
