= Otherside of the Game =

Single by Erykah Badu

from the album Baduizm
- Released: September 22, 1997
- Recorded: 1996
- Studio: Sigma Sound Studios (Philadelphia, PA)
- Genre: Neo soul; jazz; soul
- Length: 6:33
- Label: Kedar; Universal
- Songwriters: Erykah Badu; Questlove; James Poyser; Richard Nichols
- Producers: The Roots; Richard Nichols

Erykah Badu singles chronology
| "Next Lifetime" (1997) | "Otherside of the Game" (1997) | "Tyrone" (1997) |

Music video
- "Other Side Of The Game" on YouTube

"Otherside of the Game" is a song recorded by American singer Erykah Badu for her debut studio album Baduizm (1997). It was written by Badu, Questlove, James Poyser and Richard Nichols. The song effectively showcases Badu's debt to jazz aside from neo soul. It is a ballad with lyrics describing the story of a conflicted woman in a troubled relationship. She is expecting a baby with her husband, so she feels she must stand by him despite his apparently illegal activities. Universal Records released the song as the third single from Baduizm in Japan on September 22, 1997.

== Commercial performance ==
"Otherside of the Game" was commercially released only in Japan, where it did not manage to chart. In the United States, the song was serviced to urban contemporary radio but was not released physically. Due to Billboard's rules at the time not allowing airplay-only singles to enter the main charts, the song was only eligible for airplay charts. It peaked at number 14 on the US R&B/Hip-Hop Airplay chart, spending a total of 20 weeks on the chart.

== Music video ==
The accompanying music video for "Otherside of the Game" starts with the title "a story by Erykah Badu", like its predecessor "Next Lifetime". It then shows Badu waking up her husband, played by her then-boyfriend André 3000, as the two are being playful, affectionate, and loving towards each other. As the couple lounge around the house, Badu glances through a kitchen window and notices a police car parked outside. Moments later, André answers the door and a pair of cops greet him, dropping off an envelope filled with money, likely from illegal activities. As the couple counts the cash, André receives a message on his pager and quickly gathers his things and leaves the home. Badu sits on her bed, concerned and frustrated.

== Track listings and formats ==
US 12-inch vinyl

1. "Otherside of the Game" (album version) – 6:35
2. "Otherside of the Game" (a cappella) – 6:35
3. "Otherside of the Game" (instrumental) – 6:35

Japanese maxi CD single

1. "Otherside of the Game" (radio edit) – 4:15
2. "Otherside of the Game" (instrumental) – 6:35
3. "Otherside of the Game" (a cappella) – 6:35

== Charts ==
Weekly chart performance for "Otherside of the Game"
| Chart (1997) | Peak position |
|---|---|
| US Adult R&B Songs (Billboard) | 2 |
| US R&B/Hip-Hop Airplay (Billboard) | 14 |

== Release history ==
Release dates and formats for "Next Lifetime"
| Region | Date | Format(s) | Label(s) | Ref. |
|---|---|---|---|---|
| Japan | September 22, 1997 | Maxi CD | MCA | |
