= Neo soul =

Genre of popular music

- Stylistic origins: Soul; R&B; hip-hop; quiet storm; funk; jazz; fusion; pop; rock; electronic
- Cultural origins: 1980s – early 1990s, U.S.
- Derivative forms: Retro-soul

Other topics
- Acid jazz; alternative hip-hop; African-American music; hip-hop soul; nu jazz; progressive soul; psychedelic soul; rare groove

Neo soul (sometimes called progressive soul) is a genre of popular music. As a term, it was coined by music industry entrepreneur Kedar Massenburg during the late 1990s to market and describe the style of music that emerged from soul and R&B. Evolving from soul music, neo soul is distinguished by a less conventional sound than its contemporary R&B counterpart, with elements ranging from funk, jazz fusion, hip-hop and rock. It has been noted by music writers for its conscious lyrics.

Neo soul developed during the 1980s and early 1990s, by Black-Americans in the United States, as a soul revival movement. It earned mainstream success during the mid-late 1990s, with the commercial and critical breakthroughs of several artists, including D'Angelo, Maxwell, Erykah Badu, and Lauryn Hill. Their music was marketed as an alternative to the producer-driven, digitally approached R&B of the time, although many of them were ambivalent about the term.

Since its initial mainstream popularity and impact on the sound of contemporary R&B, neo soul has been expanded and diversified musically through the works of both American and international artists. Its mainstream presence declined during the 2000s, although newer artists emerged through more independent means of marketing their music. In his book The Essential Neo Soul (2010), music journalist and culture critic Chris Campbell writes that, while the genre has been "woefully misunderstood", there is "a historical and social relevance that validates its designation as the current face of alternative progressive soul music (in both underground and overground circles), complete with a distinct origin and developmental evolution". According to Mark Anthony Neal, "neo-soul and its various incarnations has helped to redefine the boundaries and contours of black pop."

== Etymology ==
By definition, neo-soul is a paradox. Neo means new. Soul is timeless. All the neo-soul artists, in various ways, perform balancing acts, exploring classic soul idioms while injecting a living, breathing presence into time-tested formulas. They humanize R&B, which has often been reduced to a factory-perfected product. Like sushi, neo-soul is fresh enough to be served raw.

— Dimitri Ehrlich (Vibe, 2002)

As a term, neo soul was coined by Kedar Massenburg of Motown Records in the late 1990s as a marketing category following the commercial breakthroughs of artists such as D'Angelo, Erykah Badu, Lauryn Hill, and Maxwell. The success of D'Angelo's 1995 debut album Brown Sugar has been regarded by several writers and music critics as the inspiration behind the term's origin. In a 2002 interview for Billboard, Massenburg said that genre classifications are often unpopular because they may be suggestive of a short-lived trend. However Massenburg felt there was a need to market artists of the genre for listeners to have an understanding of what they were listening to.

In a 2010 article for PopMatters, music writer Tyler Lewis said that neo soul has been received with much controversy: "Given the way black music has been named by (usually) outsiders ever since the blues, the reaction to the name by artists who ostensibly fit into the 'neo-soul' category represents a wonderful example of black self-determination in an industry that is still defiantly wedded to narrow definitions and images of black folks." Jason Anderson of CBC News compares the etymology of neo soul to that of "new wave" and comments: "neo-soul is still an effective tag to describe the mix of chic modernity and time-honoured tradition that distinguished the genre's best examples. Neo-soul artists tried to look both backward and forward, acting in the belief that a continuum might exist."

== Characteristics ==
The term received widespread use by music critics and writers who wrote about artists and albums associated with the musical style. African American studies professor Mark Anthony Neal has described neo soul as "everything from avant-garde R&B to organic soul ... a product of trying to develop something outside of the norm in R&B". According to music writers, the genre's works are mostly album-oriented and distinguished by its musicianship and production, incorporating "organic" elements of classic soul music with the use of live instrumentation, in contrast to the more single-oriented, hip-hop-based, and producer-driven sampling approach of contemporary R&B. Neo soul also incorporates elements of electronic music, jazz fusion, funk, rap, gospel, rock, reggae, and African music. In her book Musical Rhythm in the Age of Digital Reproduction, music author Anne Danielsen wrote that neo soul toward the end of the 1990s exhibited a musical development that was part of "a remarkable increase in musicians' experimentation with and manipulation of grooves at the microrhythmic level – that is, the level in played music that is usually understood in terms of phrasing and timing."

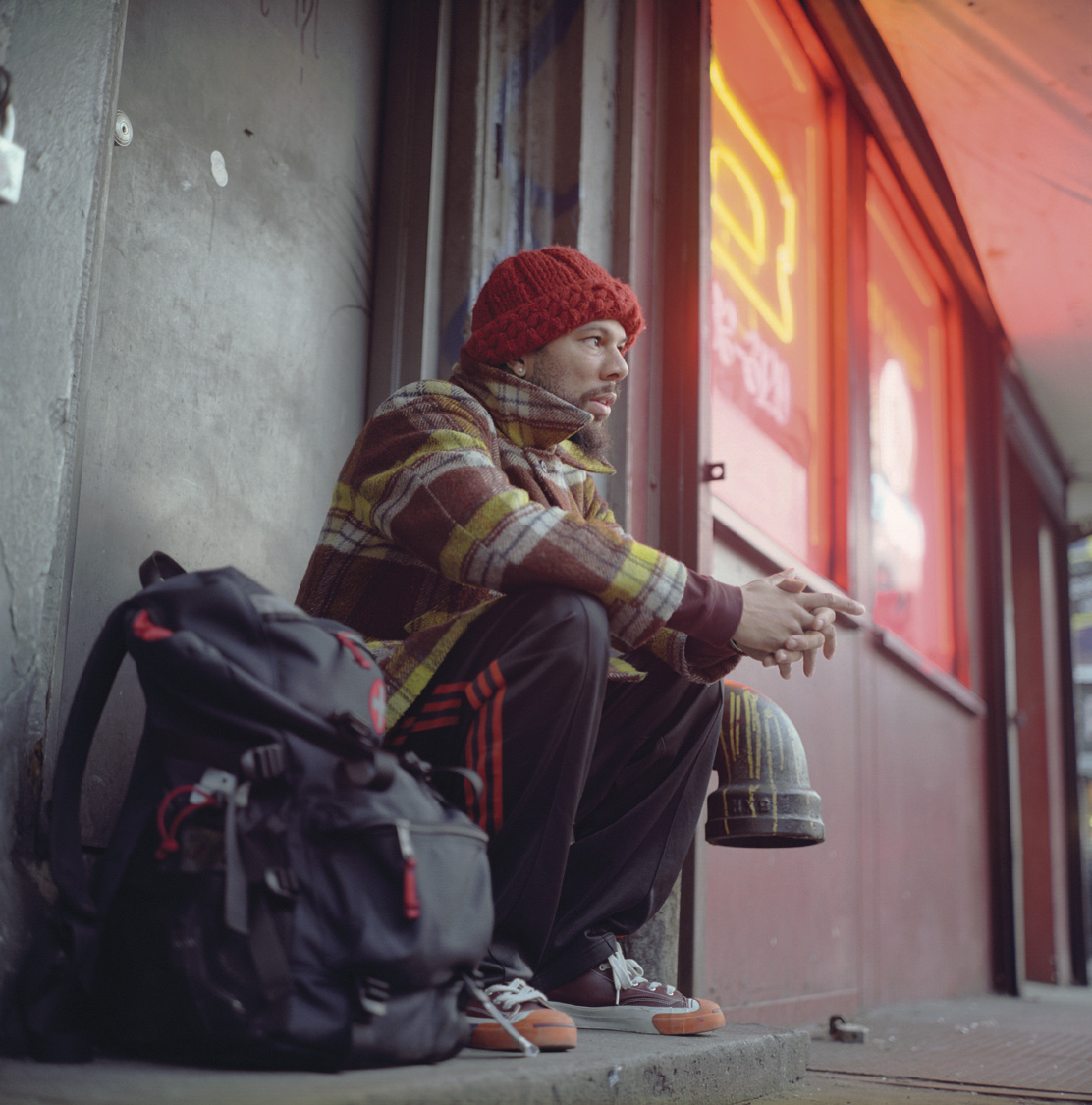
Common (shown in 2003) wore knit caps fashioned in the style of Marvin Gaye.

Noting that most of the genre's artists are singer-songwriters, writers have viewed their lyrical content as more "conscious-driven" and having a broader range than most other R&B artists. AllMusic calls it "roughly analogous to contemporary R&B." Dimitri Ehrlich of Vibe said that they "emphasize a mix of elegant, jazz-tinged R&B and subdued hip hop, with a highly idiosyncratic, deeply personal approach to love and politics". Music writers have noted that neo soul artists are predominantly female, which contrasts the marginalized presence of women in mainstream hip-hop and R&B. Jason Anderson of CBC News called neo soul a "sinuous, sly yet unabashedly earnest" alternative and "kind of haven for listeners turned off by the hedonism of mainstream hip-hop and club jams." Neo soul artists are often associated with alternative lifestyles and fashions, including organic food, incense, and knit caps.

According to music writer Peter Shapiro, the term itself refers to a musical style that obtains its influence from older R&B styles, and bohemian musicians seeking a soul revival, while setting themselves apart from the more contemporary sounds of their mainstream R&B counterparts. In a 1998 article on neo soul, Time journalist Christopher John Farley wrote that singers such as Hill, D'Angelo, and Maxwell "share a willingness to challenge musical orthodoxy". Miles Marshall Lewis commented that 1990s neo soul "owed its raison d'être to '70s soul superstars like Marvin Gaye and Stevie Wonder", adding that "in concert, Erykah Badu and D'Angelo regularly covered Chaka Khan, the Ohio Players, and Al Green, to make the lineage crystal clear." In citing Tony! Toni! Toné! as progenitors of the genre, Tony Green of Vibe viewed that the group pioneered the "digital-analog hybrid sound" of neo soul and "dramatically refreshed the digitalized wasteland that was R&B in the late '80s". Neo soul artists during the 1990s were heavily inspired by the eclectic sound and mellow instrumentation of Gil Scott-Heron's and Brian Jackson's collaborative work in the 1970s. All About Jazz cited Jackson as "one of the early architects" of the sound and his early work with Scott-Heron as "an inspirational and musical Rosetta stone for the neo-soul movement".

== History ==
=== Early 1990s: Stylistic origins ===
Neo soul originated in the early 1990s, with the work of musical acts such as Tony! Toni! Toné!, Terence Trent D'Arby and Mint Condition, whose music deviated from the conventions of most contemporary R&B at the time. Tony! Toni! Toné!-member Raphael Saadiq later embarked on a solo career and produced various works of other neo soul artists. Some artists that further popularized this sound during the early 1990s included Zhané, Groove Theory, Joi, Tony Rich, and Me'Shell NdegéOcello.

NdegéOcello's 1993 debut album Plantation Lullabies was later credited as the beginning of neo soul; according to Renee Graham of The Boston Globe, it was "arguably the first shot in the so-called 'neo-soul' movement". The success of Tony! Toni! Toné!'s 1993 album Sons of Soul was also viewed as a precursor to the soul music revival in the mid-1990s. Cheo Hodari Coker said in 1997 that the album "largely sparked the soul music revival that has opened the door for a new generation of singers who build on the tradition of Marvin Gaye and Stevie Wonder". Allmusic editor Leo Stanley wrote that by the release of Tony! Toni! Toné!'s follow-up album House of Music in 1996, "their influence was beginning to be apparent, as younger soul singer-songwriters like Tony Rich and Maxwell began reaching the R&B charts. Like Tony! Toni! Toné!, Rich and Maxwell relied on traditional soul and R&B values of songwriting and live performances, discarding the synth-heavy productions of the late '80s and early '90s".

Several hip-hop groups have also been cited as precursors to neo soul. Malcolm Venable of Vibe highlights the early work of hip-hop band The Roots, who used live instrumentation, as a precursor to neo soul's commercial breakthrough in the mid-1990s. Kierna Mayo, former editor-in-chief of Ebony, said that alternative hip-hop group A Tribe Called Quest's early 1990s albums The Low End Theory and Midnight Marauders "gave birth to neo-everything ... That entire class of D'Angelo, Erykah Badu, Maxwell, and Lauryn Hill".

=== Mid–late 1990s: Mainstream breakthrough ===
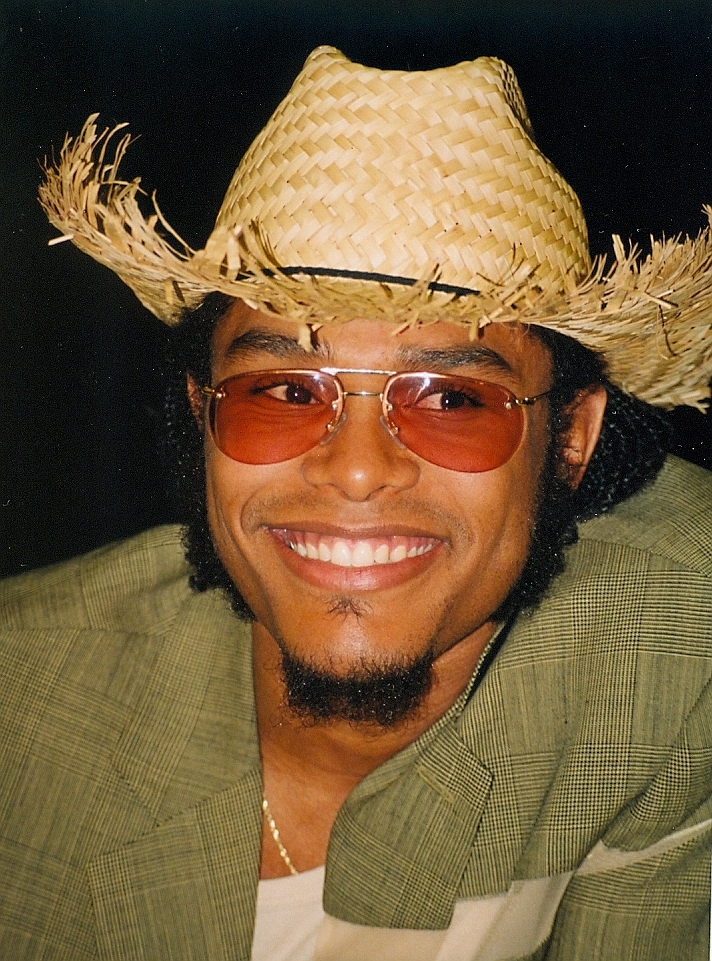
Maxwell, one of neo soul's original successes, in 1998

In 1995, former corporate marketer turned artist manager Kedar Massenburg established the record label Kedar Entertainment Inc., through which he released the breakthrough neo soul recordings of artists such as Badu, D'Angelo, and Chico DeBarge. Music journalists have specifically credited the successes of D'Angelo's Brown Sugar (1995), Maxwell's Urban Hang Suite (1996), Badu's Baduizm (1997), and Hill's The Miseducation of Lauryn Hill (1998) with shaping and raising the neo soul movement to commercial visibility into the late 1990s. According to Farley, D'Angelo's album "gives a nod to the past, ... mints his own sound, with golden humming keyboards and sensual vocals and unhurried melodies ... His songs were polished without being slick and smart without being pretentious", while Badu "brought an iconoclastic spirit to soul music, with her towering Afrocentric headwraps, incense candles, and quirky lyrics". Baduizm sold nearly three million copies and won Badu two Grammy Awards. Hill's Miseducation album featured her singing and rapping, with deeply personal lyrics, and was one of neo soul's primary successes, achieving massive sales, critical acclaim, and five Grammy Awards. The 1997 film Love Jones capitalized on neo soul's success at the time with its soundtrack album, which impacted the Billboard charts and featured artists such as Hill, Maxwell, The Brand New Heavies, Me'Shell NdegéOcello, Groove Theory, and Dionne Farris.

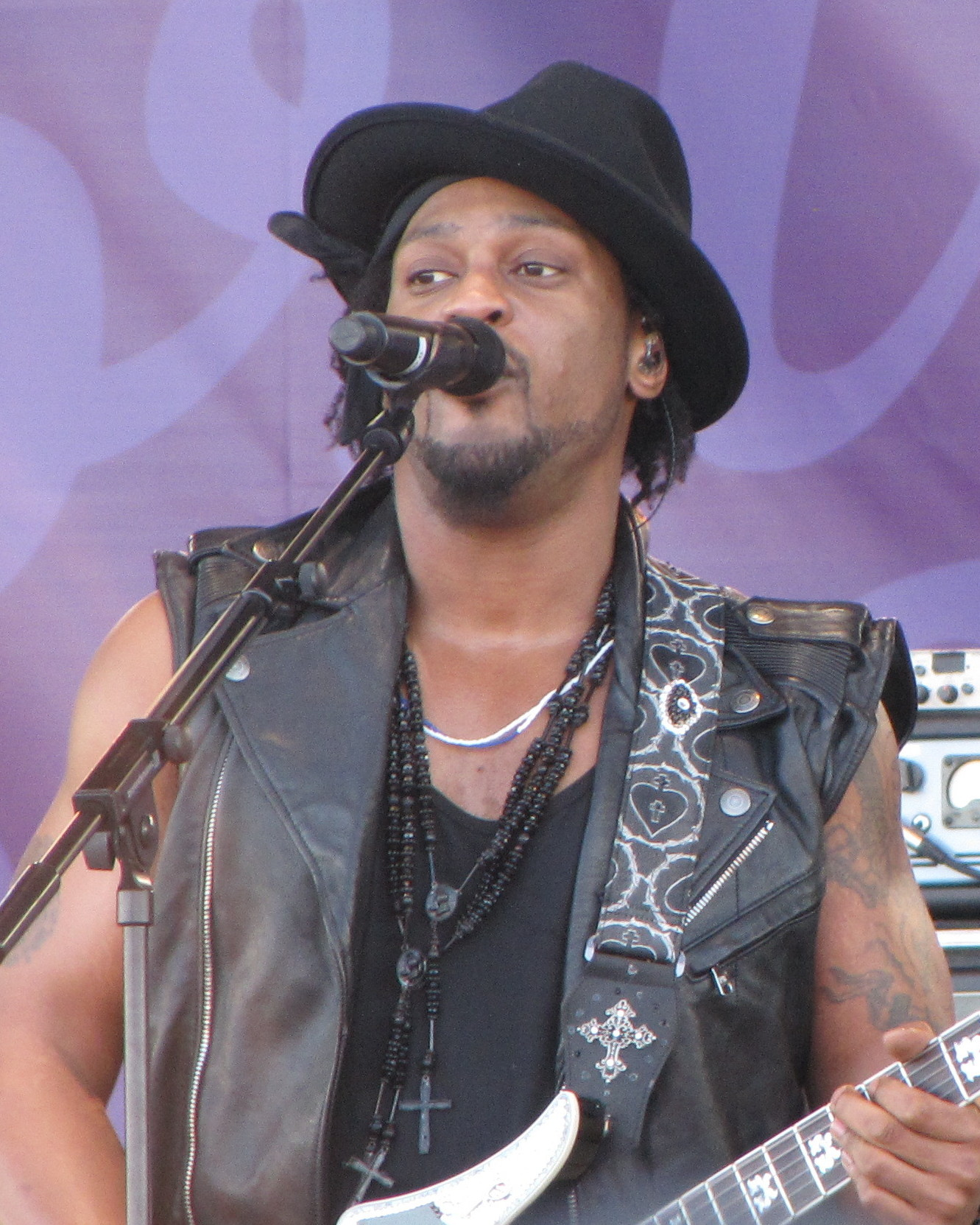
D'Angelo, pictured in 2012, was a major figure in neo soul music, with his 2000 album Voodoo being particularly influential.

After a brief marketing downturn, neo soul gained more mainstream popularity in 1999 with commercial successes by Hill, Maxwell, Eric Benét, Saadiq, and Les Nubians. It impacted mainstream radio while influencing contemporary R&B acts, such as R. Kelly and Aaliyah, to incorporate some of its textural and lyrical elements. In Kelly's song "When a Woman's Fed Up" (1998), the singer incorporated a more soul-based sound and referenced Badu's 1997 song "Tyrone" in the lyrics. Other female artists broke through with their debut albums, including Macy Gray, Angie Stone, and Jill Scott. Although Scott's album Who Is Jill Scott? Words and Sounds Vol. 1 would not see release until 2000, she co-wrote and sang on "You Got Me" (the 1999 hit single by hip-hop band The Roots) and received further exposure as a supporting performer on the band's tour that year. "Thanks to her stint on 'You Got Me' and subsequent live shows", Joel McIver wrote, "Scott can be credited as the first female artist to emerge in Erykah Badu's wake who could seriously claim to have challenged her superiority at the top of the neo-soul tree".

During the late 1990s and early 2000s, the musical collective Soulquarians—consisting of such artists as D'Angelo, The Roots, Erykah Badu, Bilal, Mos Def, Common, James Poyser, J Dilla and Q-Tip—contributed significantly to the neo soul movement with what Greg Kot described as its members' "organic soul, natural R&B, boho-rap". The collective developed through the production work of The Roots' drummer and producer Questlove.

=== Early 2000s: Height of hype ===
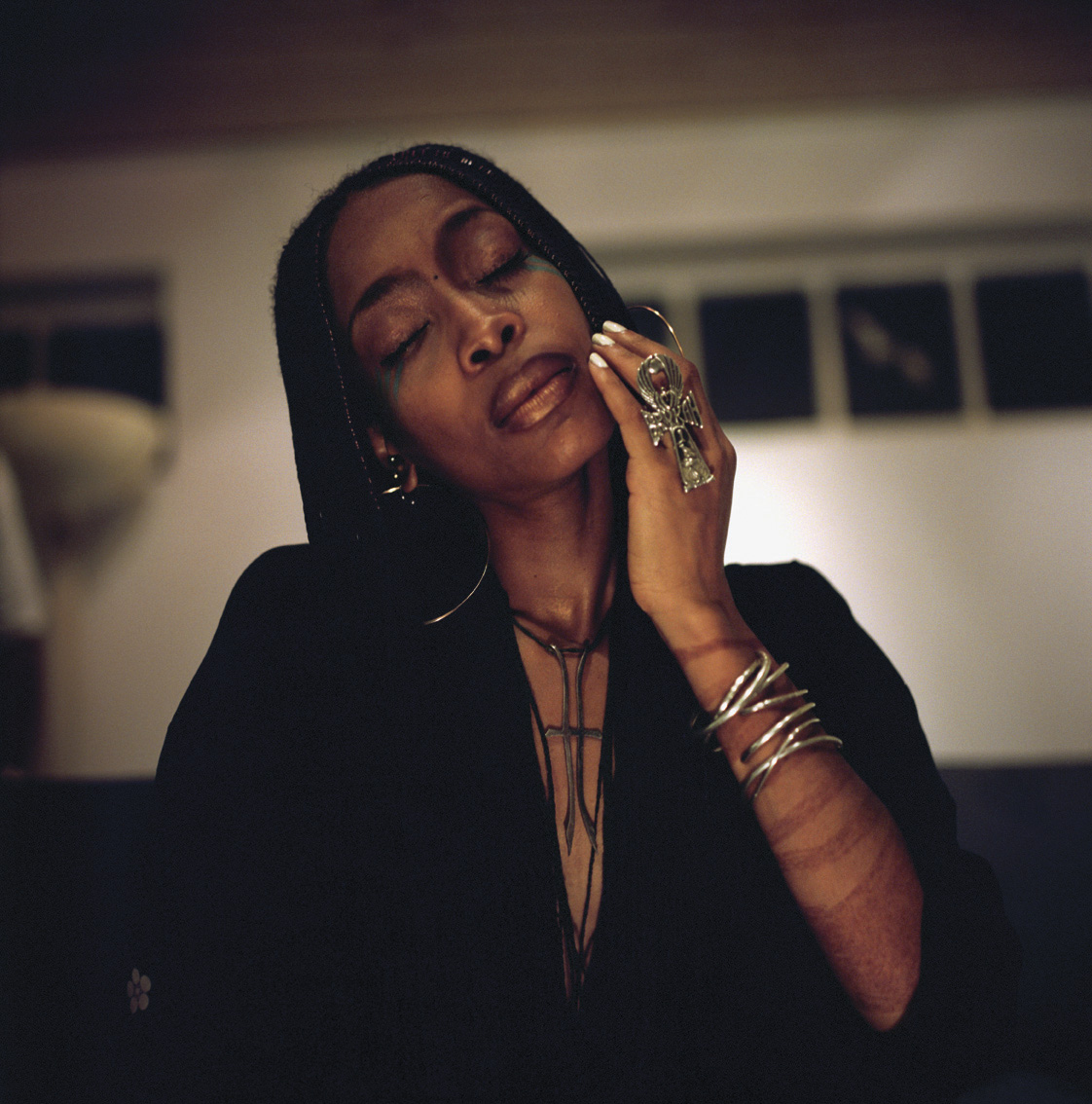
Although she rejects the term, Erykah Badu has been called "the first lady of neo soul" and "the queen of neo-soul".

In 2000, D'Angelo released his second album Voodoo, serving as a further alternative to the mainstream of late 1990s R&B and hip-hop, as neo soul reached its apex in the new decade. A production of the Soulquarians, it was an exemplary creative milestone of neo soul. Ben Ratliff of The New York Times called the album "the succes d'estime that proves the force of this new music: it is a largely unslick, stubbornly idiosyncratic and genuinely great album that has already produced two hit singles". The year also saw Badu's second album Mama's Gun, by which time the singer had been dubbed by writers as "the queen of neo-soul", although she said of the honorific title, "I hated that because what if I don't do that anymore? What if I change? Then that puts me in a penitentiary." Scott's first album Who Is Jill Scott? sold millions worldwide and proved one of the genre's significant releases.

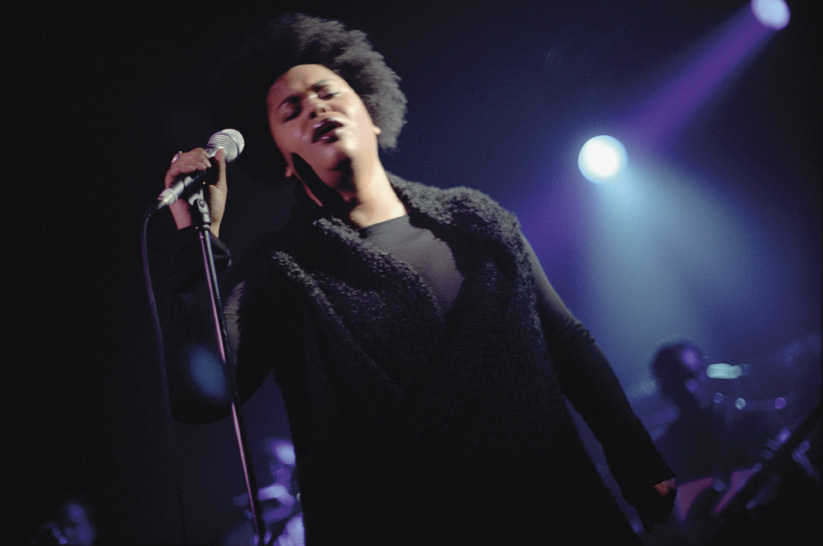

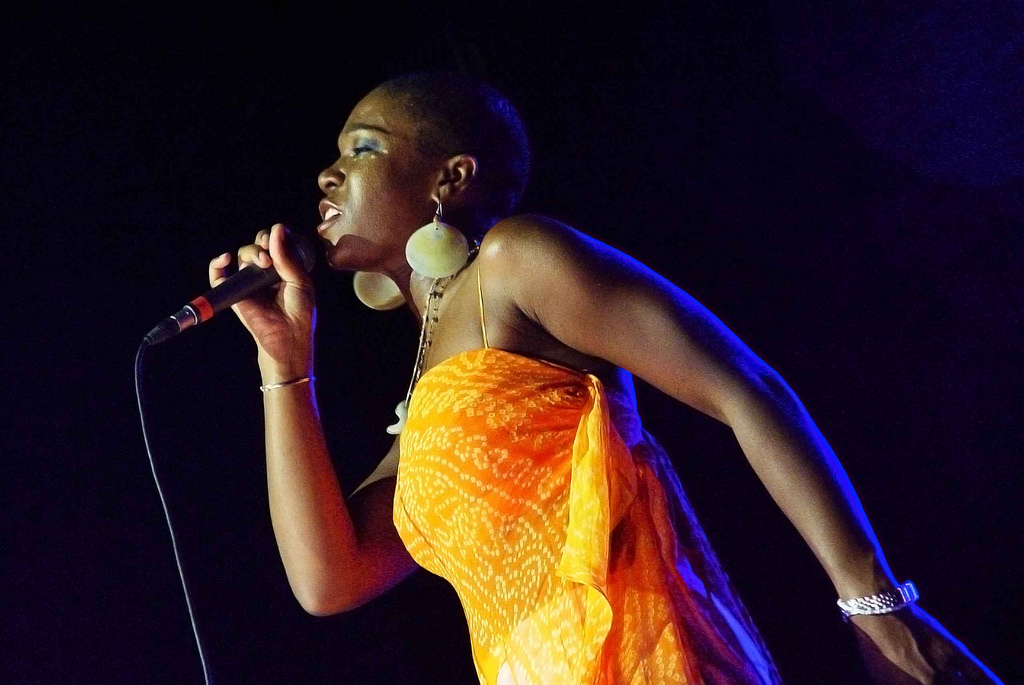
Jill Scott (top) and India.Arie (bottom), two of the top-selling neo soul singers of the early 2000s

Other successful performers marketed as neo soul at this time included Bilal, Musiq Soulchild, India.Arie, and Alicia Keys, who broke through to broader popularity with her debut album Songs in A Minor (2001). According to AllMusic biographer Andy Kellman, although Bilal may have been the "one R&B artist for whom the neo-soul categorization seemed limiting", his 2001 debut album 1st Born Second was an "exemplary" release for the genre and a top-10 R&B chart success. Hip-hop acts such as The Roots and Common, also associated with the Soulquarians, released albums that incorporated neo soul: Phrenology (2002) and Electric Circus (2003). Commenting on neo soul's hype, Daphne Brooks wrote in 2004, "The increasing attention paid to heavily hyped 'neo-soul' artists such as Jill Scott and Indie.arie ... suggest[s] that cultural memory is now recognized as a marketable aesthetic strategy of expression in contemporary pop."

=== 2010s–present: Late period ===
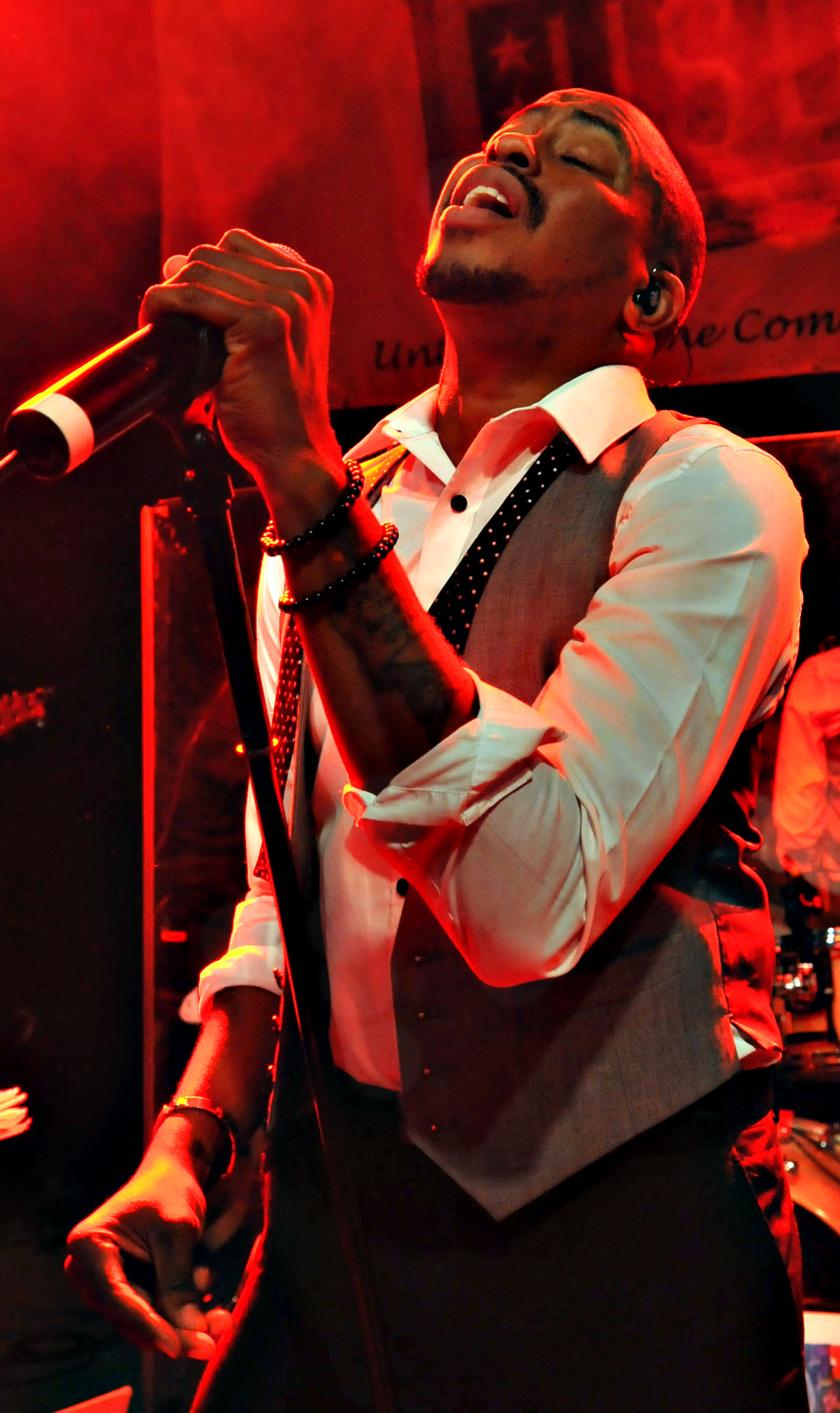
Raheem DeVaughn performs socially conscious and love-themed songs, and has been compared to Donny Hathaway and Marvin Gaye.

Since its original popularity, neo soul has been expanded and diversified musically through the works of both American and international artists. The more popular neo soul artists of the 2010s included Aloe Blacc, Maxwell, John Legend, Anthony Hamilton, Chrisette Michele, Leela James, and Raheem DeVaughn. DeVaughn has described himself as an "R&B Hippy Neo-Soul Rock Star", viewing it as a reference to his eclectic musical style. In its 2010 issue on critical moments in popular music, Spin cited D'Angelo's Voodoo and its success as a turning point for neo soul: "D'Angelo's pastiche of funk, carnal ache, and high-minded, Afrocentric rhetoric stands as neo-soul's crowning achievement. So unsurpassable that it'd be eight years before we'd hear from Erykah Badu and Maxwell again, while Hill and D'Angelo remain missing. But Alicia Keys, John Legend, and Cee-Lo picked up D's mantle and ran with it". Evan Rytlewski of The A.V. Club discerns "a line of revelatory, late-period neo-soul albums" with the releases of Maxwell's BLACKsummers'night (2009), Badu's New Amerykah Part Two (Return of the Ankh) (2010), Bilal's Airtight's Revenge (2010), Aloe Blacc's Good Things (2010) and Frank Ocean's Channel Orange (2012). In the 2010s and 2020s, other neo soul acts included Tyler, The Creator, Fitz and the Tantrums, Mayer Hawthorne, Nathaniel Rateliff & the Night Sweats, JMSN, Sol Chyld and Amos Lee.

In August 2019, Okayplayer journalist Keith Nelson Jr. published a piece highlighting 11 recording artists who are "on the precipice of pushing neo-soul forward" into its third decade of existence: Steve Lacy ("cut from the abstract neo-soul cloth of Frank Ocean where you're just as likely to have a jam session as you are to hear philosophical quips"), Mahalia ("singer-songwriter, with honeyed vocals ... songs of love and anguish typically exist in narratives, similar to Jill Scott, who paved her path"), Adrian Daniel ("experimentation and vulnerability that is reminiscent of fellow Brooklynite Maxwell"), VanJess ("sister duo float between the soulful chemistry of Floetry and the unapologetically assertive of City Girls ... artful sexual empowerment"), Donovan ("avant-garde singer and instrumentalist ... bedroom intimate vocals and [emotive] production"), Ari Lennox ("can make Tinder plights sound rich with soul ... akin to Erykah Badu"), Marco McKinnis ("Anthony Hamilton meets D'Angelo ... hazy ambient sounds"), Baby Rose ("exquisitely guttural voice makes [love] palpable"), Kyle Dion ("a register so high it sounded like tearful begging"), Lucky Daye ("his love odes are imbued with a Raphael Saadiq-esque adventurousness"), and Iman Omari ("a faint Bilal tinge ... music that leans heavy on a jazz/hip-hop").

== See also ==
- African-American music
- Progressive soul
