= Erykah Badu discography =

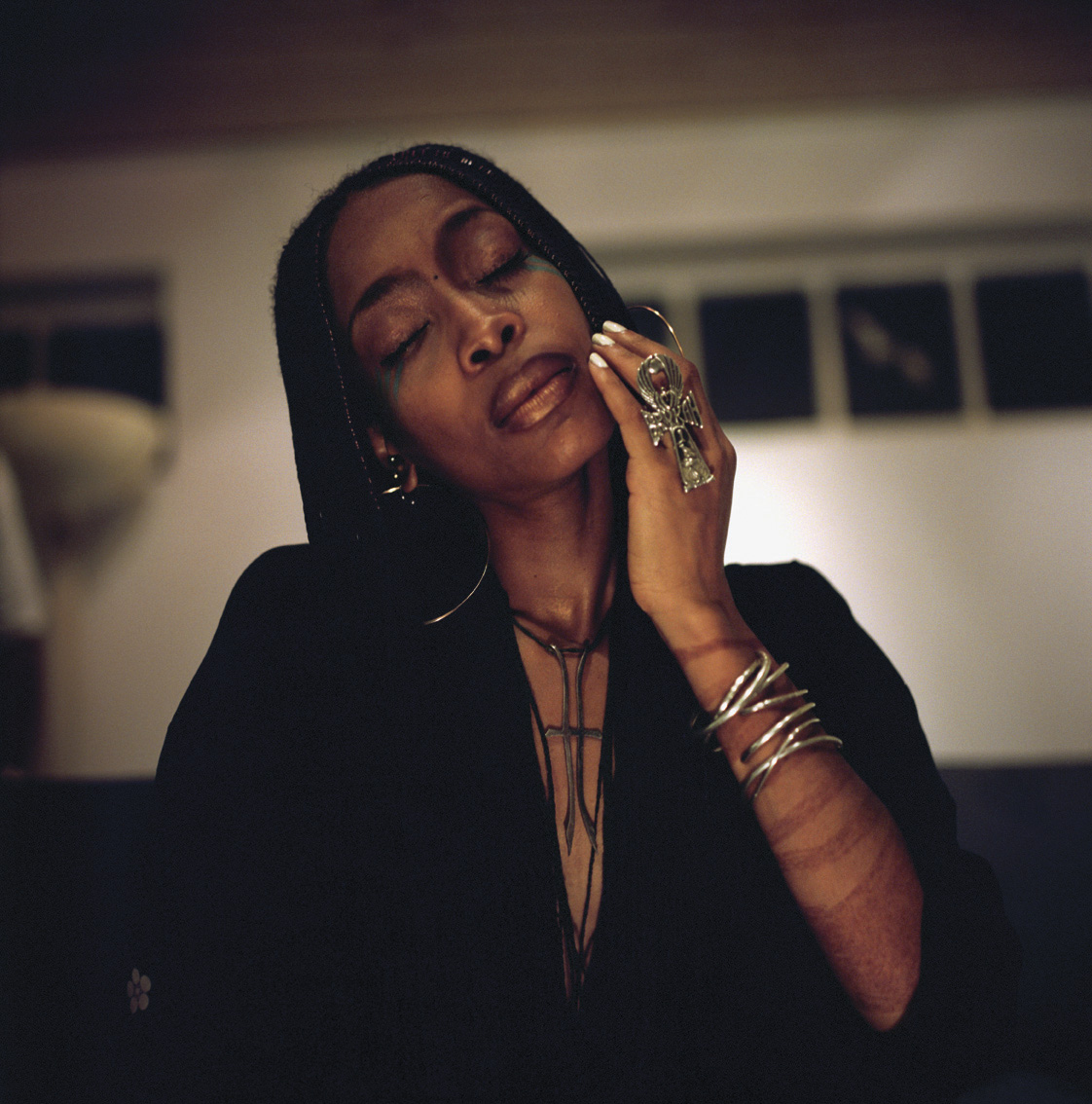
- Badu in 2002
- Studio albums: 5
- Live albums: 1
- Compilation albums: 1
- Singles: 31
- Music videos: 20
- Mixtapes: 1
- Promotional singles: 3
- Collaborative albums: 1

American singer Erykah Badu has released five studio albums, one collaborative album, one live album, one compilation album, one mixtape, 31 singles (including 13 as a featured artist), three promotional singles and 20 music videos. Badu's career began after opening a show for D'Angelo in 1994 in her hometown; record label executive Kedar Massenburg was highly impressed with her performance and signed her to Kedar Records. Her debut album, Baduizm, was released on February 11, 1997. It spawned three singles: "On & On", "Next Lifetime", and "Otherside of the Game". The album was certified triple platinum by the Recording Industry Association of America (RIAA). Badu's first live album, Live, was released on November 18, 1997, and was certified double Platinum by the RIAA.

Badu's second studio album, Mama's Gun, was released on October 31, 2000. It spawned three singles: "Bag Lady", "Didn't Cha Know", and "Cleva". The album was certified platinum by the RIAA. Badu's third album, Worldwide Underground, was released on September 16, 2003. It generated two singles: "Danger" and "Back in the Day (Puff)". The album was certified gold by the RIAA. Badu's fourth studio album, New Amerykah Part One (4th World War), was released on February 26, 2008. It spawned two singles: "Honey" and "Soldier". New Amerykah Part Two (Return of the Ankh) was released in 2010 and fared well both critically and commercially.

== Albums ==
=== Studio albums ===
List of studio albums, with selected chart positions, sales figures and certifications
Title	Details	Peak chart positions										Sales	Certifications
Title	Details	US	US R&B /HH	AUT	FRA	GER	NL	NOR	SWE	SWI	UK	Sales	Certifications
Baduizm	Released: February 11, 1997; Label: Kedar, Universal; Formats: CD, LP, cassette, digital download	2	1	—	—	—	32	26	7	—	17	US: 2,800,000	RIAA: 3× Platinum; BPI: Platinum; MC: Platinum
Mama's Gun	Released: November 21, 2000; Label: Motown; Formats: CD, LP, cassette, digital download	11	3	56	42	42	7	20	19	33	76	US: 1,400,000	RIAA: Platinum; BPI: Gold; MC: Gold; NVPI: Gold
Worldwide Underground	Released: September 16, 2003; Label: Motown; Formats: CD, LP, digital download	3	2	64	—	57	42	9	7	32	93	US: 609,000	RIAA: Gold
New Amerykah Part One (4th World War)	Released: February 26, 2008; Label: Universal Motown; Formats: CD, LP, digital download	2	2	39	49	44	25	13	5	10	55	US: 359,000	
New Amerykah Part Two (Return of the Ankh)	Released: March 30, 2010; Label: Universal Motown; Formats: CD, LP, digital download	4	2	38	77	61	66	14	21	18	56		
Before the World Blows (with the Alchemist)	Released: August 28, 2026; Label: Control Freaq, Young; Formats: CD, LP, digital download, streaming	—	—	—	—	—	—	—	—	50	—		

=== Live albums ===
List of live albums, with selected chart positions and certifications
Title	Details	Peak chart positions				Certifications
Title	Details	US	US R&B /HH	NL	UK	Certifications
Live	Released: November 18, 1997; Label: Kedar; Formats: CD, LP, Cassette	4	1	5	195	RIAA: 2× Platinum; NVPI: Platinum

=== Compilation albums ===
List of compilation albums, with selected chart positions
Title	Details	Peaks
Title	Details	US R&B /HH
Icon	Released: August 31, 2010; Label: Universal; Format: CD	32

=== Mixtapes ===
List of mixtapes, with selected chart positions
Title	Details	Peak chart positions			
Title	Details	US	US R&B /HH	BEL (FL)	CAN
But You Caint Use My Phone	Released: November 27, 2015; Label: Motown, Control Freaq; Formats: LP, digital download	14	2	153	96

== Singles ==
=== As lead artist ===
List of singles as lead artist, with selected chart positions and certifications, showing year released and album name
Title	Year	Peak chart positions								Certifications	Album
Title	Year	US	US R&B /HH	US R&B/HH Airplay	US Adult R&B	CAN	NL	NZ	UK	Certifications	Album
"On & On"	1996	12	1	1	2	—	—	44	12	RIAA: Gold; BPI: Gold; RMNZ: Gold	Baduizm
"Next Lifetime"	1997	— (Note: "Next Lifetime" did not enter the Billboard Hot 100, but peaked at number 61 on the Hot 100 Airplay chart.)	—	1	1	—	100	40	30		Baduizm
"Otherside of the Game"	1997	—	—	14	2	—	—	—	—		Baduizm
"Appletree"	1997	—	—	30	23	—	—	—	47		Baduizm
"Tyrone"	1997	— (Note: "Tyrone" did not enter the Billboard Hot 100, but peaked at number 62 on the Hot 100 Airplay chart.)	—	1	1	—	19	—	—		Live
"Southern Gul" (featuring Rahzel)	1999	76	24	40	—	—	—	—	—		Make the Music 2000
"Bag Lady"	2000	6	1	2	2	6	93	—	—		Mama's Gun
"Didn't Cha Know"	2000	— (Note: "Didn't Cha Know" did not enter the Billboard Hot 100, but peaked at number 13 on the Bubbling Under Hot 100 Singles chart.)	28	26	6	—	99	—	—	BPI: Silver; RMNZ: Platinum	Mama's Gun
"Cleva"	2001	—	77	71	20	—	—	—	—		Mama's Gun
"Love of My Life (An Ode to Hip-Hop)" (featuring Common)	2002	9	1	1	4	—	—	—	—		Brown Sugar and Worldwide Underground
"Danger"	2003	82	27	28	—	—	—	—	—		Worldwide Underground
"Back in the Day (Puff)"	2003	—	62	62	13	—	—	—	—		Worldwide Underground
"Honey"	2007	88	22	22	5	—	—	—	—		New Amerykah Part One (4th World War)
"Soldier"	2008	—	— (Note: "Soldier" did not enter the Hot R&B/Hip-Hop Songs chart, but peaked at number 12 on the Bubbling Under R&B/Hip-Hop Songs chart.)	—	31	—	—	—	—		New Amerykah Part One (4th World War)
"The Healer"	2008	—	—	—	—	—	—	—	—		New Amerykah Part One (4th World War)
"Window Seat"	2010	95	16	16	1	—	—	—	—		New Amerykah Part Two (Return of the Ankh)
"Turn Me Away (Get MuNNY)"	2010	—	87	—	22	—	—	—	—		New Amerykah Part Two (Return of the Ankh)
"Gone Baby, Don't Be Long"	2011	—	—	—	—	—	—	—	—		New Amerykah Part Two (Return of the Ankh)
"Tempted" (with James Poyser)	2019	—	—	—	—	—	—	—	—		The Photograph (Original Motion Picture Soundtrack)
"3:AM" (with Rapsody)	2024	—	—	—	—	—	—	—	—		Please Don't Cry
"Next to You" (with the Alchemist)	2025	—	—	—	—	—	—	—	—		Non-album single
"Witch Doctor" (with The Alchemist)	2026	—	—	—	—	—	—	—	—		Before the World Blows
"—" denotes a recording that did not chart or was not released in that territory.

=== As featured artist ===
List of singles as featured artist, with selected chart positions and certifications, showing year released and album name
Title	Year	Peak chart positions									Certifications	Album
Title	Year	US	US R&B /HH	CAN	FRA	GER	NL	NZ	SWI	UK	Certifications	Album
"All Night Long" (Common featuring Erykah Badu)	1998	—	—	—	—	—	—	—	—	—		One Day It'll All Make Sense
"One" (Busta Rhymes featuring Erykah Badu)	1998	—	—	—	—	—	—	17	—	23		When Disaster Strikes...
"You Got Me" (The Roots featuring Erykah Badu)	1999	39	11	—	28	25	46	37	15	31	BPI: Silver; RMNZ: Gold	Things Fall Apart
"The Light" (Remix) (Common featuring Erykah Badu)	2000	—	—	—	—	—	—	—	—	—		Bamboozled: Original Motion Picture Soundtrack
"Sweet Baby" (Macy Gray featuring Erykah Badu)	2001	—	—	16	—	—	80	12	36	23		The Id
"Come Close Remix (Closer)" (Common featuring Erykah Badu, Pharrell and Q-Tip)	2003	—	86	—	—	—	—	—	—	—		Non-album singles
"I C U (Doin' It)" (Violator featuring A Tribe Called Quest and Erykah Badu)	2003	—	89	—	—	—	—	—	—	—		Non-album singles
"Poetry" (The RH Factor featuring Q-Tip and Erykah Badu)	2003	—	—	—	—	—	—	—	—	—		Hard Groove
"Bandy Bandy" (Zap Mama featuring Erykah Badu)	2004	—	—	—	—	—	—	—	—	—		Ancestry in Progress
"That Heat" (Sérgio Mendes featuring Erykah Badu and will.i.am)	2006	—	—	—	—	—	—	—	—	—		Timeless
"Get Live" (Strange Fruit Project featuring Erykah Badu)	2006	—	—	—	—	—	—	—	—	—		The Healing
"The Heart Gently Weeps" (Wu-Tang Clan featuring Erykah Badu, Dhani Harrison and John Frusciante)	2007	—	—	— (Note: "The Heart Gently Weeps" did not enter the Canadian Hot 100, but peaked at number 71 on the Hot Canadian Digital Singles chart.)	—	—	—	—	—	—		8 Diagrams
"See Thru to U" (Flying Lotus featuring Erykah Badu)	2012	—	—	—	—	—	—	—	—	—		Until the Quiet Comes
"Q.U.E.E.N." (Janelle Monáe featuring Erykah Badu)	2013	—	47	—	—	—	—	—	—	—		The Electric Lady
"—" denotes a recording that did not chart or was not released in that territory.

=== Promotional singles ===
List of promotional singles, with selected chart positions, showing year released and album name
Title	Year	Peaks	Album
Title	Year	US R&B /HH	Album
"Your Precious Love" (with D'Angelo)	1996	83	High School High: The Soundtrack
"The Blast" (Remix) (Talib Kweli and Hi-Tek featuring Erykah Badu)	2001	—	Non-album single
"Poetry" (The RH Factor featuring Erykah Badu and Q-Tip)	2003	—	Hard Groove
"—" denotes a recording that did not chart or was not released in that territory.

== Other charted songs ==
Title	Year	Peak chart positions				Album
Title	Year	US Adult R&B	BEL (FL) Tip	JPN	KOR Int.	Album
"Fall in Love (Your Funeral)"	2010	—	—	—	79	New Amerykah Part Two (Return of the Ankh)
"Afro Blue" (Robert Glasper Experiment featuring Erykah Badu)	2012	—	—	42	—	Black Radio
"Phone Down"	2015	10	91	—	—	But You Caint Use My Phone

== Guest appearances ==
List of non-single guest appearances, with other performing artists, showing year released and album name
Title	Year	Other artist(s)	Album
"A Child with the Blues"	1997	Terence Blanchard	Eve's Bayou: The Collection
"A Child with the Blues" (Izm Mix)	1997	None	Eve's Bayou: The Collection
"Funky Nassau"	1998	Joe Morton, Dan Aykroyd, John Goodman, Paul Shaffer, The Blues Brothers Band	Blues Brothers 2000: Original Motion Picture Soundtrack
"Liberation"	1998	Outkast	Aquemini
"Ye Yo"	1998	None	Hav Plenty
"No More Trouble"	1999	Bob Marley	Chant Down Babylon
"Hollywood"	2000	None	Bamboozled: Original Motion Picture Soundtrack
"Plenty"	2000	Guru	Guru's Jazzmatazz, Vol. 3: Streetsoul
"Humble Mumble"	2000	Outkast	Stankonia
"Be Thankful"	2001	Omar	Best by Far
"Today (Earth Song)"	2001	None	Red Star Sounds Volume One: Soul Searching
"Aquarius"	2002	Common, Bilal	Electric Circus
"Jimi Was a Rock Star"	2002	Common	Electric Circus
"Heaven Somewhere"	2002	Common, Omar, Cee-Lo, Bilal, Jill Scott, Mary J. Blige, Lonnie "Pops" Lynn	Electric Circus
"Akai Inochi"	2004	Misia	Mars & Roses
"Searching"	2004	Roy Ayers	Mahogany Vibe
"Searching" (Extended Version)		Roy Ayers	Mahogany Vibe
"Everybody Loves the Sunshine"		Roy Ayers	Mahogany Vibe
"Ain't No Mistaken (Danger Part II)"	2006	Big Tuck	Tha Absolute Truth
"Fly Away"	2007	Sa-Ra, Georgia Anne Muldrow	The Hollywood Recordings
"Hold On"	2007	Pharoahe Monch	Desire
"Foreword"	2007	Jay Electronica, Just Blaze	Act I: Eternal Sunshine (The Pledge)
"Vibrate On"	2009	None	Girlfriends: The Soundtrack
"Dirty Beauty"	2009	Sa-Ra Creative Partners	Nuclear Evolution: The Age of Love
"Maybach Music III"	2010	Rick Ross, T.I., Jadakiss	Teflon Don
"Silly"	2010	David Banner, 9th Wonder	Death of a Pop Star
"20 Feet Tall" (Remix)	2011	9th Wonder, Rapsody	The Wonder Years
"Afro Blue"	2012	Robert Glasper Experiment	Black Radio
"Hey Shooter"	2012	Rocket Juice & the Moon	Rocket Juice & the Moon
Dam(n)	2012	Rocket Juice & the Moon, M.anifest	Rocket Juice & the Moon
"The First Time Ever I Saw Your Face"	2012	The Flaming Lips	The Flaming Lips and Heady Fwends
"Drivin Round"	2012	Ghostface Killah, Sheek Louch, Masta Killa, GZA	Wu Block
"Heaven for the Sinner"	2013	Bonobo	The North Borders
"Cure"	2013	Papoose	The Nacirema Dream
"Treehome95"	2013	Tyler, The Creator, Coco O	Wolf
"Rememory"	2015	Donnie Trumpet & The Social Experiment	Surf
"Maiysha (So Long)"	2016	Miles Davis, Robert Glasper	Everything's Beautiful
"WiFi"	2016	DRAM	Big Baby D.R.A.M.
"Lowkey"	2020	Teyana Taylor	The Album
"Yun"	2022	RM	Indigo
"F.U."	2024	Jamie xx	In Waves (Deluxe)
"On Me"	2024	Lekan	So You Know

== Other credits ==
Title	Year	Artist	Album	Credit
"The 'Notic"	1997	The Roots featuring D'Angelo	Men in Black: The Album	Vocals
"Liberation"	1998	Outkast	Aquemini	Additional vocals

== Music videos ==
=== As lead artist ===
List of music videos as lead artist, showing year released and directors
Title	Year	Director(s)
"On & On"	1997	Paul Hunter
"Next Lifetime"	1997	Erykah Badu and Troy Montgomery
"Other Side of the Game"	1997	Erykah Badu
"Tyrone (live)	1998	Erykah Badu and J. Kevin Swain
"Bag Lady"	2000	Erykah Badu
"Didn't Cha Know"	2001	Erykah Badu
"Love of My Life (An Ode to Hip Hop)" (featuring Common)	2002	Erykah Badu and Chris Robinson
"Honey"	2008	Erykah Badu and Chris Robinson
"Jump Up in the Air and Stay There" (featuring Lil Wayne and Bilal)	2010	Erykah Badu
"Window Seat"	2010	Coodie & Chike
"Window Seat Part II" (featuring Rick Ross)	2010	Erykah Badu
"Gone Baby, Don't Be Long"	2011	Flying Lotus
"Fall in Love (Your Funeral)" (in-studio performance)	2011	Unknown
"Out My Mind, Just in Time (Movement I)"	2011	Erykah Badu
"Out My Mind, Just in Time (Movement II)"	2011	Erykah Badu
"Witch Doctor"	2026	Ayinde Anderson

=== As featured artist ===
List of music videos as featured artist, showing year released and directors
Title	Year	Director(s)
"You Got Me" (The Roots featuring Erykah Badu)	1999	Charles Stone III
"Bandy Bandy" (Zap Mama featuring Erykah Badu)	2005	Bill Fishman
"That Heat" (Sérgio Mendes featuring Erykah Badu and will.i.am)	2006	Syndrome and Nabil Elderkin
"Western Esotericism" (The Flaming Lips featuring Erykah Badu)	2012	George Salisbury
"Q.U.E.E.N." (Janelle Monáe featuring Erykah Badu)	2013	Alan Ferguson
