= Mama's Gun '25: The Return of Automatic Slim Tour =

2025 concert tour by Erykah Badu

- Tour by Erykah Badu
- Location: United States; Europe
- Associated album: Mama's Gun
- Start date: October 3, 2025
- End date: December 10, 2025
- Legs: 3
- No. of shows: 28
- Supporting act: Westside Gunn
- Website: erykahbadu.com

Erykah Badu concert chronology
- Abi & Alan: Luv Iz... Tour (2025); Mama's Gun '25: The Return of Automatic Slim Tour (2025)

Mama's Gun '25: The Return of Automatic Slim Tour was the fourteenth headlining concert tour by American singer-songwriter Erykah Badu. It was launched to commemorate the 25th anniversary of her second studio album Mama's Gun (2000). The tour commenced in Los Angeles, California on October 3, 2025, and culminated in Irving, Texas on December 10, 2025, comprising 28 shows across the US and Europe.

== Background and development ==
In November 2000, Erykah Badu released her second studio album Mama's Gun. The album was largely recorded at the Electric Lady Studios in New York City with the collective Soulquarians. It received widespread critical acclaim, predominantly for its production techniques and Badu's songwriting, (Note: attributed to multiple sources) and garnered three Grammy Award nominations. Reaching number 11 on the US Billboard 200, it was regarded as a sophomore slump in comparison to the commercial success of Badu's debut, Baduizm (1997).

In February 2001, Badu embarked on Mama's Gun World Tour in support of the album, touring across North America and Europe until September. Critically acclaimed for Badu's stage presence and vocal performance, (Note: attributed to multiple sources) the tour was retrospectively credited with establishing Badu as a touring artist and solidifying her fanbase. Badu reflected on the reassurance by the response she received while touring: "[When] I started to tour again and saw all the people show up who knew the words, it was confirmation that the work is not always for commercial success. It's also for spiritual upliftment."

In 2025, Badu embarked on a co-headlining tour with The Alchemist, titled Abi & Alan: Luv Iz... Tour, in support of their upcoming collaborative album Abi & Alan (2026). Visiting Japan and North America, the tour commenced in Osaka on June 28, and culminated in Austin, Texas on August 24. During the tour, Badu announced Mama's Gun '25: The Return of Automatic Slim Tour, to celebrate the 25th anniversary of Mama's Gun, on July 28. The tour was initially announced to comprise 16 dates across the US, from October 3 until December 10. Rapper Westside Gunn was further announced as the opening act for the tour's first show, at the Hollywood Bowl in Los Angeles. In September, Badu announced the tour's European leg, which commenced in London on October 24.

== Critical reception ==
Mama's Gun '25: The Return of Automatic Slim Tour received widespread critical acclaim. Reviewing the tour's opening concert at the Hollywood Bowl, both Demicia Inman of Vibe and Paula Mejía of SFGate praised Badu's vocal performance, with the former concluding that she "intentionally used the stage to build her own universe, where listeners could find a home planet, whether they lean towards her lush, romantic poetry or the third-eye reflections in her lyrical candor". In a commentary on the tour's concert at the Royal Albert Hall in London, Cordelia Page of Roar News commended the stage design and Badu's stage presence, describing the show as "imbued with energy and charisma". Giving the show four out of five stars, Jane Cornwell of The Standard emphasized the expansion of Badu's vocal range since the release of Mama's Gun. Joe Goggins of Manchester Evening News concluded that, based on the concert at the O2 Apollo Manchester, Mama's Gun "only becomes more stirring and more soulful with the passing of time". Reviewing the tour's penultimate show, at The Pinnacle in Nashville, Caché McClay of The Tennessean described it as a "high-powered and one-of-a-kind experience", while Nashville Scene's Jason Shawman noted that it utilized "an exceptional sense for using lasers and video effects to expand space".

== Set list ==
The set list is representative of multiple concerts throughout Mama's Gun '25: The Return of Automatic Slim Tour.

1. "Penitentiary Philosophy"
2. "Didn't Cha Know"
3. "My Life"
4. "...& On"
5. "Cleva"
6. "It's Gonna Be Alright"
7. "Hey Sugah" (interlude)
8. "Black Box" (poem)
9. "Booty"
10. "Annie Don't Wear No Panties"
11. "Kiss Me on My Neck (Hesi)"
12. "A.D. 2000"
13. "Orange Moon"
14. "In Love with You"
15. "Bag Lady"
16. "Time's a Wastin"
17. "Green Eyes"

Notes

- An untitled, unreleased track featuring Westside Gunn and "Ain't No Fun (If the Homies Can't Have None)" were performed during the concert at the Hollywood Bowl in Los Angeles on October 3, 2025.
- "Otherside of the Game" was performed during the concert at the Royal Albert Hall in London on October 24, 2025.
- "Jonz in My Bonz" was performed during the concert at the O2 Apollo Manchester on October 26, 2025, as a tribute to D'Angelo, who had died earlier that month.
- "Tyrone" was performed during the concert at the Fox Theatre in Detroit on November 20, 2025.

== Tour dates ==
List of concerts
Date (2025)	City	Country	Venue
October 3	Los Angeles	United States	Hollywood Bowl
October 4	Las Vegas	United States	Resorts World Theatre
October 24	London	England	Royal Albert Hall
October 25	London	England	Royal Albert Hall
October 26	Manchester	England	O2 Apollo Manchester
October 29	Paris	France	Zénith Paris
October 31	Gdynia	Poland	Gdynia Arena
November 2	Gdynia	Poland	Gdynia Arena
November 4	Berlin	Germany	Uber Eats Music Hall
November 5	Frankfurt	Germany	Jahrhunderthalle
November 7	Milan	Italy	Alcatraz
November 8	Milan	Italy	Alcatraz
November 10	Rome	Italy	Sala Santa Cecilia
November 12	Zurich	Switzerland	The Hall
November 16	Atlantic City	United States	Hard Rock Live at Mark G. Etess Arena
November 18	Boston	United States	MGM Music Hall at Fenway
November 20	Detroit	United States	Fox Theatre
November 22	Cincinnati	United States	Andrew J. Brady Music Center
November 23	Atlanta	United States	Cobb Energy Performing Arts Centre
November 24	Atlanta	United States	Cobb Energy Performing Arts Centre
November 28	Houston	United States	713 Music Hall
November 29	Houston	United States	713 Music Hall
December 2	Chicago	United States	Chicago Theatre
December 3	Chicago	United States	Chicago Theatre
December 5	New York City	United States	Kings Theatre
December 6	New York City	United States	Kings Theatre
December 8	Nashville	United States	The Pinnacle
December 10	Irving (Note: labeled as Dallas in promotional material)	United States	The Pavilion at Toyota Music Factory
