= Didn't Cha Know =

2000 single by Erykah Badu

Single by Erykah Badu

from the album Mama's Gun
- Released: November 28, 2000
- Recorded: 2000
- Genre: Neo soul; R&B
- Length: 3:58
- Label: Motown
- Songwriter: Erica Wright
- Producer: J Dilla

Erykah Badu singles chronology
"Bag Lady" (2000)	"Didn't Cha Know" (2000)	"Cleva" (2001)

Music video
- "Didn't Cha Know?" on YouTube

"Didn't Cha Know" is a song recorded by American singer Erykah Badu for her second studio album Mama's Gun (2000). It was written by Badu and produced by fellow Soulquarian member J Dilla, and features a sample from Tarika Blue's song "Dreamflower" (1977). The song was released as the second single from Mama's Gun on November 28, 2000, by Motown Records.

"Didn't Cha Know" failed to enter the US Billboard Hot 100, peaking at number 13 on its extension chart Bubbling Under Hot 100 Singles. It also peaked at number 28 on the US Hot R&B/Hip-Hop Songs. Despite its lackluster commercial performance, the song was nominated for Best R&B Song at the 44th Annual Grammy Awards (2002).

== Controversy ==
"Didn't Cha Know" features a sample from American jazz and soul ensemble Tarika Blue's song "Dreamflower" (1977). The sample was used without prior permission from the group. However, Badu and Motown Records reached a settlement fee with Tarika Blue outside of court.

== Track listings and formats ==
European CD single
No.	Title	Length
1.	"Didn't Cha Know" (radio edit)	3:58
2.	"Tyrone" (live)	3:55

European maxi CD single
No.	Title	Length
1.	"Didn't Cha Know" (radio edit)	3:58
2.	"Tyrone" (live)	3:55
3.	"Hollywood"	5:32
4.	"Drama"	6:02

== Charts ==
=== Weekly charts ===
Chart (2001)	Peak position
Netherlands (Single Top 100)	99
US Bubbling Under Hot 100 (Billboard)	13
US Adult R&B Songs (Billboard)	6
US Hot R&B/Hip-Hop Songs (Billboard)	28

=== Year-end charts ===
Chart (2001)	Position
US Hot R&B/Hip-Hop Songs (Billboard)	90

== Certifications ==
Region	Certification	Certified units/sales
New Zealand (RMNZ)	Platinum	30,000^{‡}
United Kingdom (BPI)	Silver	200,000^{‡}
^{‡} Sales+streaming figures based on certification alone.

== Release history ==
Release dates and formats for "Didn't Cha Know"
Region	Date	Format(s)	Label(s)	Ref.
United States	November 28, 2000	Urban contemporary radio	Motown	
United States	December 5, 2000	Urban adult contemporary radio	Motown	
