= Mama's Gun World Tour =

2001 concert tour by Erykah Badu

- Tour by Erykah Badu
- Location: North America; Europe
- Associated album: Mama's Gun
- Start date: February 10, 2001
- End date: September 3, 2001
- Legs: 4
- No. of shows: 57

Erykah Badu concert chronology
- Baduizm World Tour (1997–98); Mama's Gun World Tour (2001); Frustrated Artist Tour (2003)

Mama's Gun World Tour was the second headlining concert tour by American singer-songwriter Erykah Badu. It was launched in support of her second studio album Mama's Gun (2000). The tour commenced in Cleveland, Ohio on February 10, 2001, and culminated in Boston, Massachusetts on September 3, 2001, after 57 shows across North America and Europe.

== Opening acts ==
- Talib Kweli (USA—Leg 1 & 2, select dates)
- Common (USA—Leg 1 & 2, select dates)
- Musiq (USA—Leg 1)
- Nikka Costa (USA—Leg 2)

== Setlist ==
This represents an average setlist of the tour.

1. "Rimshot (Intro)"
2. "Otherside of the Game"
3. "Time's A Wastin'"
4. "Penitentiary Philosophy"
5. "Didn't Cha Know?"
6. "My Life"
7. Medley: "On & On"/"...& On"
8. "Cleva"
9. "Hey Sugah" / "Kiss Me On My Neck (Hesi)"
10. "A.D. 2000"
11. *African Dance Segment*
12. "Orange Moon"
13. "Green Eyes"
14. "Tyrone"
15. "Bag Lady"

Additional notes

- During shows on February 23, in Chicago and March 7, in San Diego, Common joined Badu on stage and both performed "Geto Heaven Pt two" from his Platinum album, Like Water for Chocolate (2000).

== Band ==
- Director/Keyboards: Geno "JuneBugg" Young
- Keyboards: R.C. Williams
- Drums: Raphael "Lock Johnson" Iglehart
- Percussions: Ramon Gonzalez
- Flute: Dwayne Kerr
- DJ: Frankie Knuckles
- Bass: Braylon Lacy
- Background vocals: N'dambi, Chinah Blac, Yahzarah

== Tour dates ==
Date	City	Country	Venue
North America
February 10, 2001	Cleveland	United States	Allen Theatre
February 12, 2001	Washington, D.C.	United States	DAR Constitution Hall
February 13, 2001	Washington, D.C.	United States	DAR Constitution Hall
February 14, 2001	New York City	United States	Radio City Music Hall
February 17, 2001	Boston	United States	Orpheum Theatre
February 18, 2001	Upper Darby Township	United States	Tower Theater
February 19, 2001	Toronto	Canada	Massey Hall
February 22, 2001	Detroit	United States	Fox Theatre
February 23, 2001	Chicago	United States	Auditorium Theatre
February 24, 2001	Chicago	United States	Auditorium Theatre
February 28, 2001	Atlanta	United States	Fox Theatre
March 1, 2001	New Orleans	United States	Saenger Theatre
March 3, 2001	Austin	United States	Austin Music Hall
March 4, 2001	Houston	United States	Aerial Theater
March 6, 2001	Phoenix	United States	Celebrity Theatre
March 7, 2001	San Diego	United States	4th & B Club
March 9, 2001	Los Angeles	United States	Universal Amphitheater
March 10, 2001	Los Angeles	United States	Universal Amphitheater
March 12, 2001	Oakland	United States	Oakland Theatre
March 14, 2001	Las Vegas	United States	The Joint
March 16, 2001	Denver	United States	Fillmore Auditorium
March 17, 2001	Kansas City	United States	Midland Theatre
March 18, 2001	Dallas	United States	Bronco Bowl
Europe
May 1, 2001	Rome	Italy	Auditorium Parco della Musica
North America
May 4, 2001	Atlanta	United States	Midtown Music Festival
June 13, 2001	Chanhassen	United States	Paisley Park
July 5, 2001	New Orleans	United States	Superdome (Essence Music Festival)
Europe
July 9, 2001	Munich	Germany	Olympiahalle
July 10, 2001	Bonn	Germany	Museumsplatz
July 11, 2001	Hamburg	Germany	Hamburg Stadtpark
July 13, 2001	Bern	Switzerland	Gurten Festival
July 14, 2001	The Hague	Netherlands	Statenhal
July 16, 2001	Manchester	England	Carling Apollo
July 17, 2001	London	England	Brixton Academy
July 18, 2001	London	England	Brixton Academy
July 20, 2001	Rotterdam	Netherlands	Rotterdam Ahoy
North America
August 1, 2001	Portsmouth	United States	Harbor Center Pavilion
August 3, 2001	Washington, D.C.	United States	DAR Constitution Hall
August 4, 2001	Richmond	United States	Landmark Theater
August 5, 2001	Baltimore	United States	Pier Six Concert Pavilion
August 6, 2001	New York City	United States	Central Park Summerstage
August 8, 2001	Clarkston	United States	Pine Knob Music Theatre
August 10, 2001	Columbus	United States	Palace Theater
August 11, 2001	Milwaukee	United States	Riverside Theater
August 12, 2001	Minneapolis	United States	Orpheum Theatre
August 15, 2001	Seattle	United States	The Pier
August 17, 2001	Concord	United States	Concord Pavilion
August 18, 2001	Santa Barbara	United States	Santa Barbara Bowl
August 19, 2001	Los Angeles	United States	Greek Theatre
August 21, 2001	San Diego	United States	Humphrey's by the Bay
August 23, 2001	Morrison	United States	Red Rocks Amphitheatre
August 25, 2001	St. Louis	United States	The Pageant
August 26, 2001	Chicago	United States	Arie Crown Theater
August 30, 2001	Toronto	Canada	Molson Amphitheatre
September 2, 2001	Atlantic City	United States	Trump Taj Mahal
September 3, 2001	Boston	United States	Fleet Pavilion

== Anniversary ==
In July 2025, Badu announced a tour celebrating the album's 25th anniversary titled the "Mama’s Gun ’25: The Return of Automatic Slim Tour".
