= Mama's Gun =

Studio album by Erykah Badu
- Released: November 18, 2000
- Recorded: c. March 1999 – November 2000
- Studios: Badu's residence (Dallas); Dallas Sound Lab (Irving); DARP (Atlanta); Electric Lady (New York); The Hit Factory (New York); Palmyra (Palmer); Stankonia (Atlanta); The Studio (Philadelphia); Tuff Gong (Kingston)
- Genre: Neo soul
- Length: 71:50
- Label: Motown
- Producers: Erykah Badu; James Poyser; Questlove; Pino Palladino; Jay Dee; Jah Born; Stephen Marley; Shaun Martin; Snook Young; Braylon Lacy; Geno Young; Gino Iglehart; Vikter Duplaix

Erykah Badu chronology
Live (1997)	Mama's Gun (2000)	Worldwide Underground (2003)

Singles from Mama's Gun
- 1. "Bag Lady" Released: August 8, 2000; 2. "Didn't Cha Know" Released: November 28, 2000; 3. "Cleva" Released: April 17, 2001

Mama's Gun is the second studio album by American singer-songwriter Erykah Badu. It was released on November 18, 2000, by Motown Records. Largely recorded at the Electric Lady Studios in New York City with the collective Soulquarians, the album is a neo soul record predominantly driven by live instruments. Writing all its songs, Badu explored themes of love, self-worth, and social equity.

After giving birth to her son with rapper André 3000 and experiencing writer's block in the aftermath of her debut studio album Baduizm (1997), Badu began writing and recording Mama's Gun in 1999. Badu primarily collaborated with drummer Ahmir "Questlove" Thompson, bassist Pino Palladino, pianist James Poyser, trumpeter Roy Hargrove, and producer Jay Dee. As the musicians simultaneously contributed to albums recorded by D'Angelo, Common, and Bilal, also at Electric Lady, the artists began collaborating, forming the Soulquarians. Consequently, Mama's Gun emerged more sonically eclectic than Baduizm, experimenting with genres such as jazz, funk, rock, reggae, and traditional soul. Badu's songwriting was more direct and honest than the complex and cryptic lyricism of Baduizm, and derived from her own experiences with fame, motherhood, and separation from André 3000.

On release, Mama's Gun received widespread critical acclaim, mainly for Badu's songwriting and vocal performance, and use of live instruments; multiple publications listed it among best albums of 2000. Commercially, it did not replicate the success of its predecessor, debuting at number 11 on the US Billboard 200 with first-week sales of 191,000 units. However, it registered the largest first-week sales of Badu's career, and was certified platinum by the Recording Industry Association of America (RIAA) four weeks after release, denoting shipments of one million units in the US. The album produced three singles—"Bag Lady", "Didn't Cha Know", and "Cleva". "Bag Lady" became Badu's first top-10 hit on the US Billboard Hot 100 by peaking at number six, and earned two nominations at the 43rd Annual Grammy Awards (2001), while "Didn't Cha Know" earned one at the following ceremony. Badu further promoted the album with the Mama's Gun World Tour (2001).

Released during a period of peak creativity in neo soul, Mama's Gun was proclaimed the female counterpart to D'Angelo's Voodoo, regarding both musical style and lyrical themes, by numerous critics. The critical acclaim persevered with retrospective commentaries, which credited the album with propelling neo soul and Afrofuturism further into the mainstream, noting its influence on artists such as Beyoncé and Childish Gambino. Considered one of Badu's best works, it has also been emphasized as impactful on Badu's career progression, establishing her as an experimental musician and as a touring artist. Furthermore, numerous authors and publications have listed Mama's Gun among the best albums of its era and of all time. To commemorate its 25th anniversary, Badu embarked on the Mama's Gun '25: The Return of Automatic Slim Tour (2025).

== Background ==
Having been signed to Universal Records and Kedar Massenburg's Kedar Entertainment, Erykah Badu released her debut studio album Baduizm on February 11, 1997. Baduizm received unanimous critical acclaim, with numerous critics comparing Badu's vocal performance to Billie Holiday; the album went on to win the Grammy Award for Best R&B Album. As the album debuted at number two on the US Billboard 200, Badu broke the record for the highest-debuting debut album by a woman. (Note: The record would be broken by Lauryn Hill in 1998, when her debut studio album The Miseducation of Lauryn Hill debuted atop the Billboard 200.) The album's success helped establish Badu as one of the emerging leading artists of neo soul, with author Joel McIver crediting Baduizm with introducing the term "neo soul" to mainstream audiences. Shortly after the album's release, Badu became pregnant with the son of her then-partner André Benjamin, widely known as André 3000 of Outkast. While promoting Baduizm, Badu recorded the live album Live, which was released on November 18, 1997—the day Badu gave birth to Seven Sirius Benjamin. Live was another commercial success for Badu, debuting at number four on the Billboard 200. Badu also pursued an acting career, starring in Blues Brothers 2000 (1998) and The Cider House Rules (1999). She further appeared on The Roots' 1999 song "You Got Me"—which won the Grammy Award for Best Rap Performance by a Duo or Group—and recorded "Southern Gul" for hip-hop artist Rahzel's debut studio album Make the Music 2000 (1999). As Massenburg resigned from his position as the senior vice president of Universal Records in favor of being appointed president and chief executive officer (CEO) of Motown in 1998, Badu transferred to Motown as well.

== Writing and recording ==
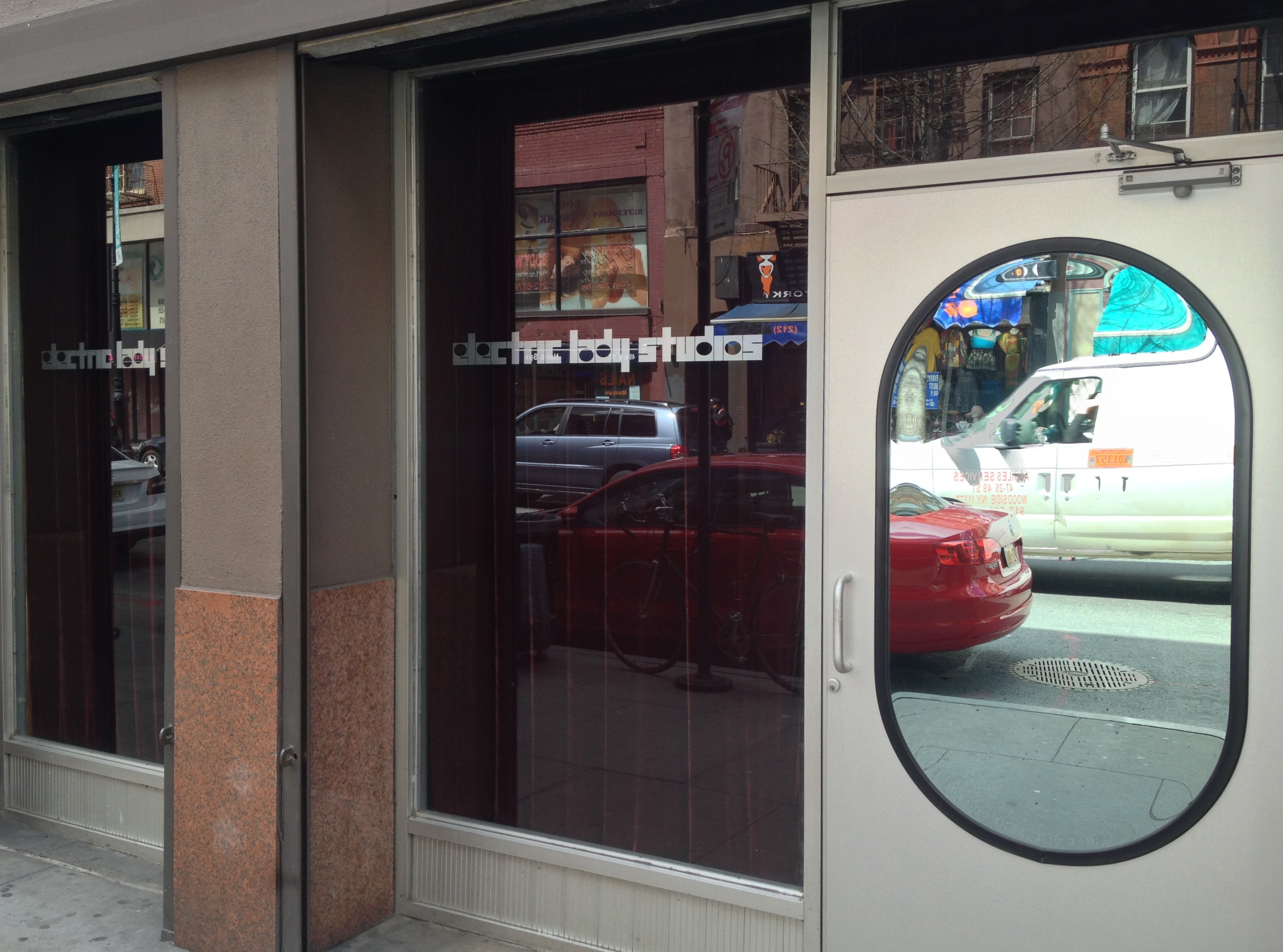
Mama's Gun was largely recorded at the Electric Lady Studios (pictured) in New York City.

By April 1999, Badu had begun recording Mama's Gun at her home studio in Dallas, having suffered from writer's block for several months. Motown enlisted mainstream R&B producers R. Kelly and Babyface, but Badu declined the offers, stating: "I respect their music but it's not necessarily parallel to what I do". In May 1999, Badu relocated to the Electric Lady Studios in New York City, founded by Jimi Hendrix. Utilizing live instruments to achieve her desired sound, Badu initially collaborated with drummer Ahmir "Questlove" Thompson, bassist Pino Palladino, and pianist James Poyser, while contributing with her own guitar and percussion, writing spontaneously as she was recording. She revealed that she would compose the songs first, before developing suitable lyrics for each one. As one of the key collaborators, Questlove envisioned a "super organic, soulful, psychedelic vibe" for the record. Badu recorded at Electric Lady's Studio C, which was originally Hendrix's apartment, and would frequently receive visits from "Jimi the cat", a cat which resided at the studios and would reportedly remain inside a studio only if he approved of mixes played inside it.

As Questlove simultaneously worked on D'Angelo's Voodoo (2000), Common's Like Water for Chocolate (2000), and Bilal's 1st Born Second (2001), the artists began arranging improvised jam sessions, and promptly formed a collective named Soulquarians. All four albums were substantially mixed by Russell Elevado, who encouraged use of analog equipment, including vintage microphones and tape recorders. Badu reflected on the recording process: "[We] were just all working in that space at the same time, and we were just artists who really admired one another and made sure we locked down all the rooms so nobody else could get in there, and we created our own clubhouse spaceship. I lived there. I lived in my room there, bathed out of the sink and all that kind of stuff." Common referred Badu to producer J Dilla, who produced the majority of Like Water for Chocolate. Badu visited J Dilla at his home in Detroit, and he told her to select a vinyl from his collection to draw inspiration from. She selected jazz-funk ensemble Tarika Blue's 1977 eponymous second and final studio album, and the pair subsequently recorded "Didn't Cha Know", employing a sample from Tarika Blue's "Dreamflower" for its background. (Note: Badu and J Dilla used "Dreamflower" without permission, and were consequently sued by Tarika Blue's record label Chiaroscuro Records. By 2003, the lawsuit had been settled for an undisclosed amount.) J Dilla co-produced two more tracks which would appear on Mama's Gun—"My Life" and "Kiss Me on My Neck (Hesi)"—under his pseudonym Jay Dee.

Badu executive produced Mama's Gun alongside Kedar Massenburg. She wrote, composed and produced all tracks, writing the lyrics for 10 out of the album's 14 tracks unassisted. Among those was "Green Eyes", which Badu wrote in the aftermath of her separation from André Benjamin, which occurred during the album's production. Betty Wright co-wrote and provided additional vocals for "A.D. 2000". Inspired by the killing of Amadou Diallo, Badu wrote the song from his perspective, questioning: "What would he say if he could sing a song right now?". As Badu was writing the song at the DARP Studios in Atlanta, Wright joined her and began contributing, and the pair immediately recorded it; the track was finished at Electric Lady. Badu also recorded several tracks at Tuff Gong in Kingston, Jamaica; the only track from those sessions to be included on the album's final track listing was "In Love with You", a collaboration with Stephen Marley, son of Bob Marley. Alongside Badu, Stephen Marley wrote the song's lyrics and music, and produced it as well. Other recording locations for Mama's Gun included the Dallas Sound Lab in Irving, Texas, the Palmyra Studios in Palmer, Texas, Outkast's Stankonia Studios in Atlanta, The Studio in Philadelphia, and The Hit Factory in New York. While recording at Electric Lady, Badu met Mark Ronson, who was working on Nikka Costa's Everybody Got Their Something (2001), with some of Badu's collaborators contributing to Costa's album during the sessions.

While recording, Badu struggled to meet the deadline for Mama's Gun set by Motown. She had not finished writing and recording the album by the time its liner notes were printed, leaving lyrics of numerous songs incomplete and urging listeners to visit her website for completed versions. As she wanted all tracks to be seamlessly sequenced, she would frequently change their order. The original track listing featured "Hey Sugah" as an intro, followed by "Booty" and 13 other tracks, including "Props to the Lonely People", co-written by Bilal. (Note: According to the initial pressing liner notes, Bilal also performed beatboxing and played Rhodes piano on "Props to the Lonely People". As of 2026, the song remains unreleased.) At the last minute, Badu decided to revise the track order, and exclude "Props to the Lonely People". On initial CD pressings, only the disc bore the correct track listing, as the alterations were made too late for the liner notes to be redesigned; the liner notes were corrected for international and future pressings. Furthermore, Badu recorded an alternate form of the lead single "Bag Lady" for Mama's Gun, and refrained from including the previously released Cheeba Sac Mix on the album, writing in the liner notes that "there was simply not enough room" for it. However, the Cheeba Sac Mix was added as the bonus track on Japanese pressings and the European reissue of Mama's Gun.

== Musical style ==
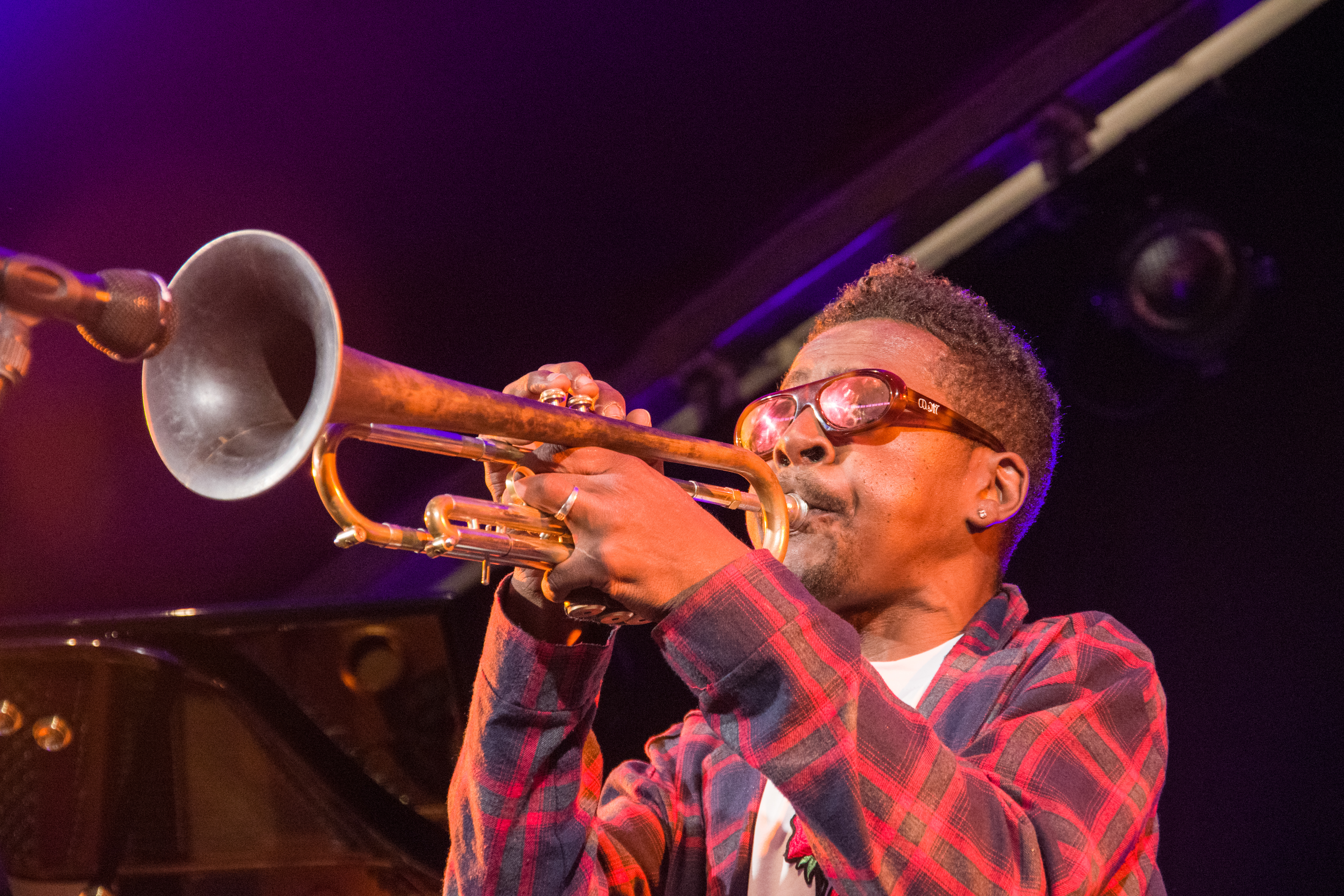
Roy Hargrove (pictured) played trumpets on "Booty" and "Green Eyes", and was credited with all horn arrangements on Mama's Gun.

Mama's Gun is primarily a neo soul album, differentiating from Baduizm by experimenting with a broad array of genres, including jazz, funk, rock, reggae, and traditional soul. (Note: attributed to multiple sources) Jake Barnes of Dotmusic described Mama's Gun as the counterweight to its predecessor: "Where her debut was light and jazzy, 'Mama's Gun' is heavy and grounded", emphasizing the opening track "Penitentiary Philosophy" as the prime example. Built on a dense arrangement of guitars and bass, "Penitentiary Philosophy" fuses 1970s funk with rock and roll. The remainder of Mama's Gun is largely driven by a multitude of live instruments as well. The airy lounge "Cleva" is driven by vibraphone played by Roy Ayers, while Badu herself plays an acoustic guitar on "A.D. 2000". 54-second flute, percussion and ad-lib vocal interlude "Hey Sugah" precedes "Booty", which utilizes tight percussion and conspicuous horns, and steadily segues into the Rhodes piano and the Minimoog synthesizer-driven "Kiss Me on My Neck (Hesi)". Flutes are further employed on "Orange Moon", while a classical guitar carries the reggae ballad "In Love with You". Throughout the album, Badu maintains the scat singing style of her debut; Stephen Marley adopted the same style on their collaboration "In Love with You".

Tracks seamlessly transition into its successors, with each transition being demonstrated with an abrupt shift in texture, which journalist Touré called a "restless soul fantasia". The sonic quality of Mama's Gun is further characterized by 1970s funk-influenced breakdowns and disjointed beats, with tracks such as "Booty" drawing influences from works of James Brown and Quincy Jones. Although the record mostly eschews programming and sample usage, tight drum loops are present on "My Life" and "Time's a Wastin". The latter's keyboard arrangement evokes sounds of a church organ during the song's bridge. "Penitentiary Philosophy" incorporates a looped sample of Stevie Wonder's 1976 song "Ordinary Pain", while its "laid-back" soul successor "Didn't Cha Know" is built on a sample from Tarika Blue's 1977 recording "Dreamflower"; neither sample is credited in the album's liner notes. "Bag Lady" contains a credited interpolation of Dr. Dre's 1999 track "Xxplosive", and appears in a slower-paced, West African gospel and blues-influenced neo soul style, substantially differing from the up-tempo Cheeba Sac Mix used for the single. (Note: attributed to multiple sources) While the hip-hop-influenced Cheeba Sac Mix incorporates the sample of "Xxplosive" to a larger extent, the album version is built on the Isaac Hayes-written and produced 1971 track "Bumpy's Lament", which had served as the basis for "Xxplosive". Mama's Gun closes with a 10-minute suite "Green Eyes", split into movements "Denial", "Acceptance?", and "The Relapse". While "Denial" maintains a 1930s-influenced jazz style, "Acceptance?" and "The Relapse" feature a melancholy, piano-driven soul approach.

== Lyrical themes ==
"Mama's Gun was a more introspective and humanized effort from Badu. The Baduizm-era had positioned her as this mythical and otherworldly goddess that, at best, could be seen as aspirational, but at its worst, pretentious. Even though she was offering profound gems through her lyrics, there was a barrier present preventing her from truly connecting with her audience. With Mama's Gun, Badu not only deconstructed the persona that became associated with her music, but also provided ammunition for the Black community, the ammunition being the food for thought she first spoke of on Baduizm's 'Appletree'."

— Sope Soetan (Okayplayer, 2020)

In an interview for The New York Times, Badu revealed the meaning behind the title of Mama's Gun to be a metaphor for her being protective of her son Seven: "And there's no better protection than your mama's words. That album is the gun: use those words, those feelings, to solve the problems." In her poem "The Warriors Remainder", written in the album's liner notes, Badu explained the title as representing a weapon eliminating "demons in [her] range", (Note: "Taking out the demons in your range" is also a line from "Time's a Wastin".) which Jake Barnes of Dotmusic interpreted as a remedy to pressures of her sudden fame in the aftermath of Baduizm. Badu later revealed that the title was also inspired by her grandmother keeping a revolver in her nightstand. Lyrical themes of Mama's Gun encompass love, self-worth, and social equity. Astrological and cosmic references are incorporated into songs such as "...& On" and "Orange Moon". The lyricism was widely noted as more honest and direct than the cryptic and complex songwriting on Baduizm; (Note: attributed to multiple sources) Badu herself addresses the expressional shift in the lyrics of "...& On": "What good do your words do / If they can't understand you / Don't keep talkin' that shit / Badu". Christopher John Farley of Time nonetheless emphasized the intricacy of lyrical themes on Mama's Gun, which he described as not restricted to singular interpretations.

On Mama's Gun, Badu places herself in a more subjective position than on Baduizm, with autobiographical songwriting stemming from prior experiences, though Badu denied Baduizm being any less introspective than Mama's Gun. Self-help-themed "My Life" is an homage to Mary J. Blige's 1994 album of the same title, and retrospectively expresses Badu's desire to achieve eminence. On "...& On"—a continuation of her debut single "On & On"—Badu reflects on her feelings of inferiority upon first menstruating. Introspective "Cleva" sees her denouncing image in favor of intellect, while accepting her own perceived shortcomings: "My hair ain't never hung down to my shoulders / And it might not grow / You never know". The end of Badu's relationship with Benjamin served as the basis for "Green Eyes", which uses its three movements to deal with different stages of heartbreak. On "Denial", Badu repudiates feelings of jealousy and distress, while "Acceptance?" and "The Relapse" depict confusion before transitioning into displays of anguish and embarrassment, interspersed with declarations of withstanding affection for Benjamin.

"Mournful and angry" opening track "Penitentiary Philosophy" and the penultimate "Time's a Wastin" deal with perils of street crime, in the vein of Badu's 1997 song "Otherside of the Game". (Note: Badu also derived the chords for "Time's a Wastin" from "Otherside of the Game".) Badu dedicated "Time's a Wastin" to the incarcerated political activist Mumia Abu-Jamal. Similarly, "Didn't Cha Know" is an encouragement of seeking a righteous path in one's quest. "A.D. 2000" is an elegy for Amadou Diallo, a Guinean man shot 41 times and killed by New York City Police Department officers in February 1999; the lyrics imagine him posthumously remarking: "No, you won't be namin' no buildings after me". The feminist "Booty" sees Badu confront a woman whose partner had been unfaithful to her by attempting to seduce Badu, with Sal Cinquemani of Slant Magazine comparing its theme to Toni Braxton's 2000 song "He Wasn't Man Enough". "Bag Lady" uses baggage as a metaphor for unresolved transgenerational trauma among women, simultaneously deprecating materialism, condemning inadequacies of institutional education regarding black women, and exploring unrequited love. According to Daphne A. Brooks of Pitchfork, love songs "Kiss Me on My Neck (Hesi)", "Orange Moon", and "In Love with You" are attached by the theme of freedom; "Kiss Me on My Neck (Hesi)" explores the pursuit of pleasure, and "In Love with You" passionately details infatuation. Badu explained the word "hesi" as an Egyptian affirmation, relating it to the law of attraction; in the context of "Kiss Me on My Neck (Hesi)", it refers to one's sexual desires coming to fruition. Meanwhile, "Orange Moon" discusses arising from a period of anguish and finding happiness, expressing appreciation to God.

== Marketing and touring ==
In July 2000, Mama's Gun was announced as indefinitely postponed, having been scheduled for a September 19 release; "Bag Lady" had already begun receiving radio airplay. "Bag Lady" was officially released as the album's lead single on August 8, and became Badu's first top-10 hit on the US Billboard Hot 100 by peaking at number six, as well as her second Hot R&B/Hip-Hop Songs number one. Its accompanying music video was directed by Badu, and shows her accompanied by four women—including her mother Kolleen Gipson and sister Nayrok Wright—wearing colors symbolizing chakras, with Badu's red attire representing Muladhara. The song's lyrical themes are further explored in the video as the women portrayed the characters of Ntozake Shange's 1976 work For Colored Girls Who Have Considered Suicide / When the Rainbow Is Enuf. After numerous delays since 1999, Mama's Gun was ultimately announced for November 21, 2000. Prior to its worldwide release, the album was first made available in Japan on November 18, as Badu commenced the album's promotional tour in the country, simultaneously arranging live chats via BET and MSNBC's respective websites. The marketing strategy for Mama's Gun also encompassed televised advertising, as well as billboard advertisements displaying the album's cover artwork. The cover, photographed by Robert Maxwell, shows a close-up image of Badu wearing an olive green crochet hat over her dreadlocks, dispassionately gazing into the camera while biting a toothpick.

"Didn't Cha Know" was released as the second single from Mama's Gun on November 27, 2000, but failed to replicate the success of its predecessor, failing to chart on the Billboard Hot 100 and instead reaching number 13 on its extension chart Bubbling Under Hot 100. Its accompanying music video was also directed by Badu, and depicts her aimlessly walking through the Mojave Desert. The video ends with Badu arising from water beneath the sand's surface, revealing her shaved head; Jaelani Turner-Williams of Stereogum interpreted Badu eschewing her signature headwrap as an emancipation from commercial expectations. On shaving her hair off, Badu commented: "I didn't give a lot of thought to it. It was just something that I knew I wanted to do right now. I wanted to do something brave, to just make room for new things." Badu further partnered with HBO for a February 2001 Black History Month campaign, through which children who submitted essays on the theme of Black History Month were given free CD copies of Mama's Gun. In January 2001, Badu announced the Mama's Gun World Tour, with the first North American leg starting in Cleveland on February 10, and finishing in Badu's hometown of Dallas on March 18. "Cleva" was subsequently released as the third and final single from Mama's Gun on April 16. Badu extended the Mama's Gun World Tour with a European leg in July, before embarking on the second North American leg the following month; the tour culminated in Boston on September 3, 2001. The tour was met with acclaim from critics and audiences alike, predominantly for Badu's stage presence and vocal performance; Badu's removal of her headwrap to reveal her shaved head during the performances of "Cleva" elicited particular praise. (Note: attributed to multiple sources) Okayplayer's Sope Soetan retrospectively remarked that the tour was pivotal for the marketing of Mama's Gun: "As the album wasn't pre-occupied with fitting into radio formats or MTV, it suggested that the best way to experience its diverse soundscapes was a live environment".

In July 2025, Badu announced Mama's Gun '25: The Return of Automatic Slim Tour, in commemoration of the 25th anniversary of Mama's Gun. The tour commenced in Los Angeles on October 3, and culminated in Dallas on December 10, comprising 28 shows across the US and Europe. It received widespread critical acclaim, predominantly for Badu's stage presence and multifaceted performance skills, as well as for imagery and stage design. (Note: attributed to multiple sources) To further celebrate the anniversary, Badu performed reinterpreted versions of "Penitentiary Philosophy", "...& On", "Time's a Wastin", "Green Eyes", and "Didn't Cha Know" alongside bassist Thundercat, and was interviewed by DJ Quik, for an episode of Spotify Anniversary, released on November 19.

== Critical reception ==
=== Initial response ===
Initial professional ratings
Review scores
Source	Rating
Boston Herald	3.5/4 stars
Dotmusic	3.5/5 stars
Entertainment Weekly	B−
The Guardian	5/5 stars
Los Angeles Times	3/4 stars
Q	3/5 stars
Rolling Stone	4/5 stars
Slant Magazine	4/5 stars
Uncut	3/5 stars
The Village Voice	A

On release, Mama's Gun received widespread critical acclaim. At Metacritic, which assigns a normalized rating out of 100 based on reviews from mainstream critics, the album received an average score of 80, based on 16 reviews, indicating "generally favorable reviews". Badu's songwriting elicited predominant praise; Touré of Rolling Stone commended Badu for abandoning the pretensions of Baduizm in favor of equally profound but more comprehensible lyrics, while Robert Christgau concluded in The Village Voice that song structures and arrangements compliment the lyricism. The A.V. Club's Keith Phipps further lauded the lyrical themes and the album's "deceptively simple arrangements, a lovely breakup suite ('Green Eyes'), and near-infinite replay value". Andy Gill of The Independent praised the feminist and politically conscious lyrical themes, which placed Badu "firmly apart from her less enlightened peers". Writing for The New York Times, Jon Pareles described the album as "cool, tantalizing and utterly self-assured", classifying it among highlights of 2000.

Alongside songwriting, Sal Cinquemani of Slant Magazine hailed the "fresh hybrid" of organic grooves, live instrumentation and modern production techniques of Mama's Gun, while The Washington Post's Joshua Klein commended Badu's choice of instrumental collaborators, namely Ahmir "Questlove" Thompson and Roy Hargrove. Writing for NPR, Tom Moon concluded that "through improvisation, Badu has found a way to make hip-hop regain its spontaneity". Michael Paoletta of Billboard praised the musical style's eclecticism, hailing the album as a "rock-solid set". PopMatters critic Wayne Franklin found the record compelling in its personal scope of Badu's psyche, calling it "a definite work of art, destined to remain in heavy rotation for some time to come". Rob Brunner of Entertainment Weekly, Michael Odell of The Guardian, and an editor of Mojo all directed praise towards Badu's nuanced and distinctive vocal performance, but were ambivalent towards the album's themes. In less laudatory reviews, Q wrote that Badu's debut had raised expectations she did not meet on Mama's Gun, while Robert Hilburn of Los Angeles Times similarly concluded that Mama's Gun lacked the cohesion of its predecessor. The album was proclaimed ninth best of 2000 by Rolling Stone, and was included on the annual poll Pazz & Jop—at number 15 as published in The Village Voice, and at number nine on Christgau's individual ranking. Internationally, Mama's Gun was included on French newspaper Libération, Icelandic newspaper Morgunblaðið, and Dutch magazine Oor's respective annual listings of best albums. At the 43rd Annual Grammy Awards (2001), the album's lead single "Bag Lady" garnered nominations for Best Female R&B Vocal Performance and Best R&B Song, while the second single "Didn't Cha Know" received a nomination in the latter category the following ceremony.

=== Retrospective commentary ===
Retrospective professional ratings
Aggregate scores
Source	Rating
Metacritic	80/100
Review scores
Source	Rating
AllMusic	4/5 stars
The Encyclopedia of Popular Music	3/5 stars
The Great Rock Discography	6/10 stars
Piero Scaruffi	6/10
Pitchfork	9.4/10
The Rolling Stone Album Guide	3.5/5 stars
Tom Hull	A−

Critical acclaim persevered with retrospective commentaries on Mama's Gun. Like Touré, Rob Theakston of AllMusic praised Badu's departure from complex lyricism, while complimenting the album's sonic quality and production, while Paul Schrodt of Slant Magazine felt surprised by the understated arrangements and honest songwriting; the latter listed the record among the best albums of the 2000s. Ranking it among the best albums ever recorded, Entertainment Weekly reflected on the album acting as a "freethinking, all-weirdos-welcome basement confessional". Rolling Stone similarly described it as "a wildly free, deliciously ambitious song cycle", which Badu had created "out of her own hard-won truths"; the publication placed the album at number 158 on its 2020 listing The 500 Greatest Albums of All Time. Pitchfork's Daphne A. Brooks lauded the album's themes, writing that Mama's Gun "turned an important page as [Badu] set out to pair songs that evoked the art of exquisite and romantically-charged lingering and hanging [...] alongside songs about being fed up with stasis, isolation, restriction and aborted dreams". Kailyn Brown of Los Angeles Times exalted the album for its "stylistically adventurous, lyrically bold and vulnerable" qualities.

Listing Mama's Gun among best albums of the 2000s, Josiah Gogarty of British GQ emphasized its charm through "slinky, soulful" quality of tracks such as "Didn't Cha Know" and "Orange Moon". Piero Scaruffi declared it inferior to Baduizm, as did Martin C. Strong in The Great Rock Discography (2004), and Colin Larkin in The Encyclopedia of Popular Music (2007). Conversely, in The New Rolling Stone Album Guide (2004), Arion Berger and Nathan Brackett listed Mama's Gun as Badu's best work at the time, calling it "less elliptical and less thickly textured" than its predecessor. The album was included in the book 1001 Albums You Must Hear Before You Die, edited by Robert Dimery. In 2008, Tom Moon included it in his book 1,000 Recordings to Hear Before You Die, while Entertainment Weekly listed it among the best albums released within previous 25 years. In 2009, German publication Sounds by Rolling Stone included Mama's Gun in its issue dedicated to "masterpieces" from each decade, spanning from the 1960s until the 2000s. The album was also included on Spin's 2015 ranking "The 300 Best Albums of the Past 30 Years", as well as on consumer-selected polls "The 150 Greatest Albums Made by Women", published by NPR in 2018, and "The 200 Best Albums of the Last 25 Years", published via Pitchfork in 2021.

== Commercial performance ==
In the US, Mama's Gun debuted at number 11 on the Billboard 200 chart dated December 9, 2000. Released during the highly competitive Thanksgiving week, it became Badu's first release not to reach the top 10 on the chart. It simultaneously debuted at number three on the Top R&B/Hip-Hop Albums, becoming Badu's third consecutive top-three entry, but also the first one not to peak atop the chart. However, the album's first-week sales of 191,000 units registered the largest of Badu's career. In its second week, the album descended to number 22 on the Billboard 200, and would go on to spend a total of 25 weeks on the chart. Four weeks after its release, Mama's Gun was certified platinum by the Recording Industry Association of America (RIAA), denoting shipments of one million units in the US. In a 2001 interview, Badu reflected on the album's commercial performance: "it has sold 1.4 million in the US. So no, it didn't sell as much [as Baduizm and Live] [...] although creatively I feel like this is a better piece of work."

Mama's Gun debuted and peaked at number 30 on the Canadian Albums Chart, and was certified gold by then-Canadian Recording Industry Association (CRIA) in January 2001, for shipments of 50,000 units in Canada. Across Europe, the album was a sleeper hit. It reached the top 10 in Finland and the Netherlands in August 2001, months after debuting at lower positions, following its special-edition reissue and the European leg of Mama's Gun World Tour. In the UK, the album debuted at number 76 on the UK Albums Chart, and exited from the chart two weeks later, simultaneously peaking at number 11 on the UK R&B Albums Chart. In 2021, Mama's Gun was certified gold by the British Phonographic Industry (BPI) for combined sales and album-equivalent units of 100,000 in the UK. In Japan, the album peaked at number 24 on the Oricon Albums Chart, and was certified gold by the Recording Industry Association of Japan (RIAJ) in January 2001, for shipments of 100,000 units in the country.

== Legacy ==
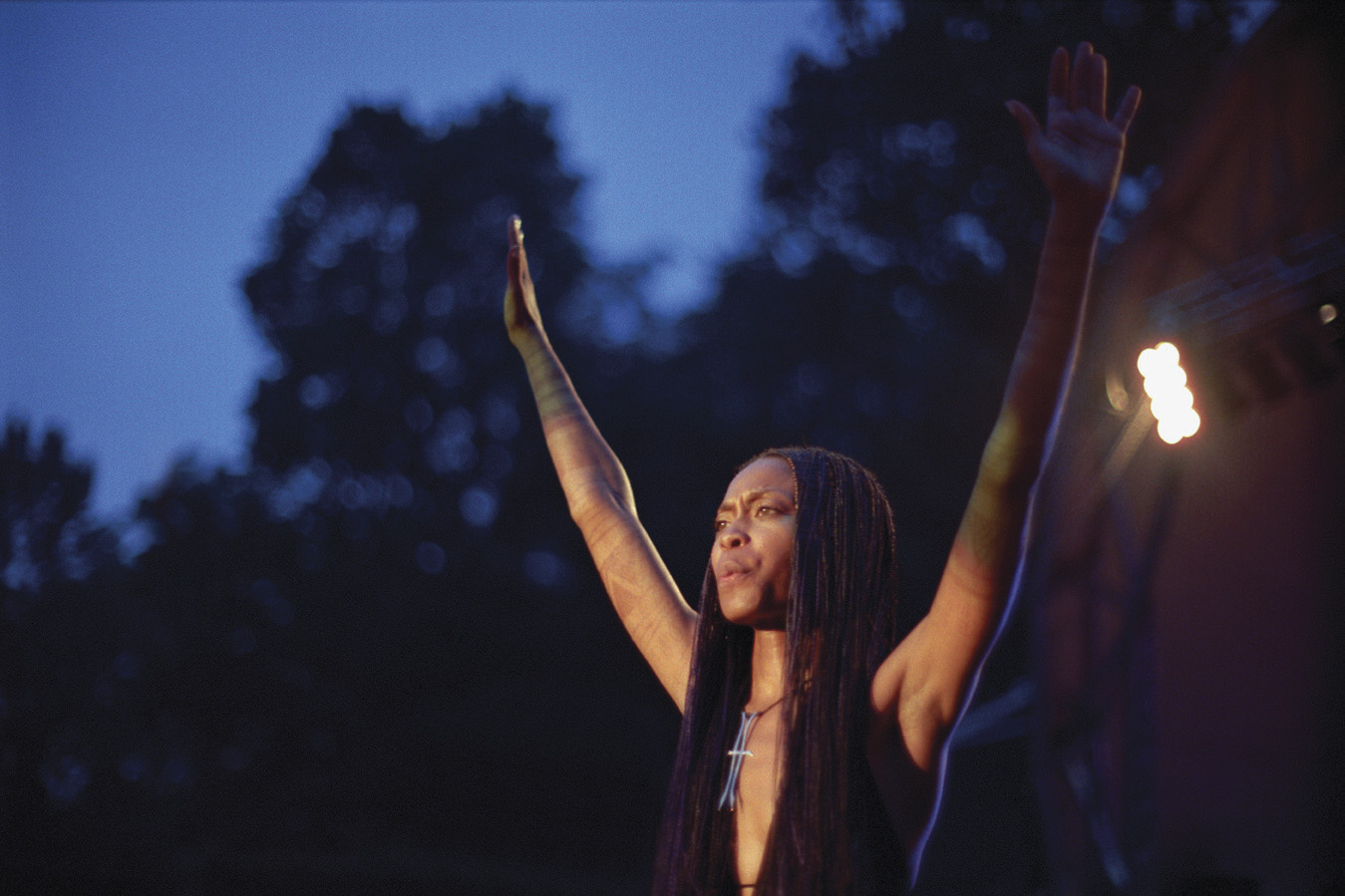
Badu in 2002

Following its release, Mama's Gun was widely recognized as a sophomore slump regarding commercial success. Though she initially expressed indifference towards sales, Badu later revealed her disappointment over the album's commercial performance, as she considered the album superior to Baduizm: "I worked really hard on Mama's Gun. I really felt I had something to prove. And when it came out, I was very pleased with my work. But the commercial success in the United States was not as great as I'd expected, and I was down for a little bit and doubted its power". However, she felt reassured by the exuberant response from attendees at her concerts during the Mama's Gun World Tour, concluding that "it was confirmation that the work is not always for commercial success. It's also for spiritual upliftment." Despite the commercial performance, numerous critics, such as Okayplayer's Sope Soetan and Pitchfork's Daphne A. Brooks, retrospectively declared the album superior to its predecessor, while Tom Breihan of Stereogum called Mama's Gun Badu's masterpiece. Reflecting on Mama's Gun World Tour, Soetan emphasized its impact on Badu's career progression, crediting the tour with solidifying her fanbase and establishing her as a touring artist. Jordan Blum of The Recording Academy attributed Badu's increasingly minimalist and experimental artistry on subsequent albums—Worldwide Underground (2003), New Amerykah Part One (4th World War) (2008), and New Amerykah Part Two (Return of the Ankh) (2010)—to the "idiosyncratic" Mama's Gun.

Mama's Gun was released during a period of peak creativity within the neo soul movement, following numerous distinguished albums of the genre, such as Lauryn Hill's The Miseducation of Lauryn Hill (1998), Macy Gray's On How Life Is (1999), D'Angelo's Voodoo, and Jill Scott's Who Is Jill Scott?: Words and Sounds Vol. 1 (2000). In 2001, Ginny Yu of Independent Weekly remarked that Mama's Gun had raised standards in the "often over-produced and under-thought realm" of pop music. The album was proclaimed the female counterpart to D'Angelo's Voodoo, regarding both musical style and lyricism, by numerous critics; (Note: attributed to multiple sources) in 2013, The New York Times's Ben Ratliff called the two albums "the great neo-soul records of 2000". Comparing Mama's Gun to The Miseducation of Lauryn Hill and Who Is Jill Scott?: Words and Sounds Vol. 1, Brooks noted that, like Hill and Scott, Badu was not willing "to sacrifice extolling narratives of black feminist self-care for ones that exposed black communal peril, trauma, and tragedy", further accentuating the influence of its feminist themes on Beyoncé's 2010s recordings. Blum and Kailyn Brown of Los Angeles Times both reflected on the album solidifying Badu's role as a leading artist of neo soul, R&B, and hip-hop. The former further credited it with extending the mainstream impact of neo soul and influencing artists such as Childish Gambino, Amy Winehouse, John Legend, Janelle Monáe, and Raheem DeVaughn. Jaelani Turner-Williams of Stereogum wrote that Mama's Gun set the foundation for the burgeoning of Afrofuturism in mainstream music throughout the 2010s, comparing Childish Gambino's "Me and Your Mama" opening his 2016 album "Awaken, My Love!" to "Penitentiary Philosophy" opening Mama's Gun. While interviewing Badu for The Fader in 2021, Mark Ronson revealed that Mama's Gun was his favorite album of its era.

== Track listing ==
All lyrics are written by Erykah Badu, except where noted.

Mama's Gun
No.	Title	Lyrics	Music	Producer(s)	Length
1.	"Penitentiary Philosophy"		Badu; James Poyser; Ahmir Thompson; Pino Palladino	Badu; Poyser; Thompson^{[a]}; Palladino^{[a]}	6:09
2.	"Didn't Cha Know"		Badu	Jay Dee; Badu	3:58
3.	"My Life"	Badu; Robert Bradford	Badu; Poyser	Badu; Poyser; Jay Dee^{[a]}	3:59
4.	"...& On"		Badu; Jahmal Cantero; Shaun Martin	Jah Born; Badu	3:34
5.	"Cleva"		Badu; Poyser	Badu; Poyser	3:45
6.	"Hey Sugah"	Badu; N'dambi	Badu; N'dambi	Badu	0:54
7.	"Booty"		Badu	Badu; Poyser^{[a]}	4:04
8.	"Kiss Me on My Neck (Hesi)"		Badu; James Yancey; Poyser; Jack DeJohnette	Badu; Jay Dee^{[a]}; Poyser^{[a]}	5:34
9.	"A.D. 2000"	Badu; Betty Wright	Badu; Wright	Badu; Poyser^{[a]}; Thompson^{[a]}; Palladino^{[a]}	4:51
10.	"Orange Moon"		Badu; Martin; Eugene "Snooky" Young; Braylon Lacy	Badu	7:10
11.	"In Love with You" (featuring Stephen Marley)	Marley; Badu	Marley; Badu	Badu; Marley	5:21
12.	"Bag Lady"		Badu; Martin; Isaac Hayes; Andre Young; Brian Bailey; Craig Longmiles; Ricardo Brown; Nathan Hale	Badu	5:48
13.	"Time's a Wastin"		Badu; Martin	Badu; Martin^{[a]}; Lacy^{[a]}; Geno Young^{[a]}; Gino Iglehart^{[a]}	6:42
14.	"Green Eyes"		Badu; Poyser; Vikter Duplaix	Badu; Poyser; Duplaix	10:04
Total length:					71:50

Japanese edition and European reissue
No.	Title	Producer(s)	Length
15.	"Bag Lady" (Cheeba Sac Radio Edit)	Badu; Tone the Backbone^{[a]}	4:11

Belgian and Dutch special edition bonus disc
No.	Title	Writer(s)	Producers(s)	Length
1.	"Tyrone" (live)	Badu; Norman Hurt		3:55
2.	"Hollywood"	David Wolinski; André Fischer	Badu	5:35
3.	"Drama"	Badu; Tyallen Macklin	Badu; Bob Power	6:04
4.	"Your Precious Love" (featuring D'Angelo)	Nickolas Ashford; Valerie Simpson	Kedar Massenburg; Bruce Carbone^{[a]}; Shante Paige^{[a]}	4:40
5.	"Bag Lady" (Basement Boys Afrocentric Mix)	Badu; Martin; Hayes; Young; Bailey; Longmiles; Brown; Hale	Badu; Basement Boys^{[b]}	8:22
6.	"Bag Lady" (music video)			4:08
7.	"Didn't Cha Know" (music video)			4:03

Notes

- ^{^[a]} signifies a co-producer
- ^{^[b]} signifies an additional producer

== Personnel ==
Credits are adapted from the liner notes of Mama's Gun.

- Jon Adler – engineering assistance (tracks 1, 3, 5, 9, 10, and 14)
- Vincent Alexander – engineering assistance (tracks 5, 10, and 13), mixing assistance (tracks 10 and 13)
- Roy Ayers – additional vocals (track 5), vibraphone (track 5)
- Erykah Badu – acoustic guitar (track 9), art direction, background vocals (tracks 1, 5, 6, 8, and 12), composition (all tracks), executive production, lyrical arrangement (track 14), MPC2000 (track 12), production (all tracks), songwriting (all tracks), vocals (all tracks)
- Brian Bailey – composition (Note: original songwriter of a sampled recording) (track 12)
- Davis Barnett – viola (tracks 3 and 13)
- Chris Bell – engineering (tracks 4, 6, 7, and 12)
- Sam Bowie – additional photography
- Robert Bradford – additional songwriting (track 2)
- Leslie Brathwaite – engineering (tracks 2, 3, 5, and 10), mixing (tracks 2, 3, 5, 10, and 13)
- Errol Brown – engineering (track 11)
- Ricardo Brown – composition (track 12)
- Chinah – background vocals (track 1)
- Tom Coyne – mastering
- Jason Dale – mixing assistance (track 4)
- Jack DeJohnette – composition (track 8)
- Vikter Duplaix – composition (track 14), production (track 14)
- Russell Elevado – engineering (tracks 1, 7, and 8), guitar (track 8), mixing (tracks 1, 7, 8, 12, and 14)
- Chris Gehringer – mastering
- Brian Geten – mixing assistance (track 6)
- Mitch Getz – engineering assistance (track 2)
- Leonard Gibbs – percussion (tracks 5, 7, and 8)
- Larry Gold – cello (track 13), string arrangement (tracks 3 and 13)
- Ramone Gonzalez – percussion (track 12)
- Mark "Exit" Goodchild – engineering (tracks 3 and 13)
- Paul Gregory – mixing assistance (track 6)
- Geff Grimes – engineering assistance (track 4)
- Nathan Hale – composition (track 12)
- Isaac Hayes – composition (track 12)
- Roy Hargrove – horn arrangements, trumpet (tracks 7 and 14)
- Carlos Henderson – acoustic bass (track 14)
- Gino "Lock Johnson" Iglehart – drums (tracks 6, 10, 12, and 13), production (track 13)
- William Jackson – engineering assistance (track 2)
- Jah Born – composition (track 4), production (track 4), programming (track 4)
- Jef Le Johnson – additional acoustic guitar (track 9), guitar (track 1)
- D'Wayne Kerr – flute (tracks 6, 8, 10, 12, and 14)
- Michael A. Knight – Appletree Cafe Inc. representation
- Olga Konopelsky – violin (tracks 3 and 13)
- Emma Kummrow – violin (tracks 3 and 13)
- Charles Kwas – violin (tracks 3 and 13)
- Braylon Lacy – bass (tracks 6, 10, 12, and 13), composition (track 10), production (track 13)
- Frank Lacy – trombone (track 7)
- Craig Longmiles – composition (track 12)
- Steve Mandel – engineering assistance (tracks 1, 5, 7, and 8), mixing assistance (tracks 1, 7, 8, 12, and 14)
- Stephen Marley – acoustic guitar (track 11), bass (track 11), composition (track 11), production (track 11), songwriting (track 11), vocals (track 11)
- Shaun Martin – composition (tracks 4, 10, 12, and 13), keyboard (tracks 6, 10, 12, and 13), production (track 13)
- Kedar Massenburg – executive production
- Robert Maxwell – cover art photography
- Shinobu Mitsuoka – engineering assistance (tracks 3–5, 8, and 9), mixing assistance (tracks 2, 3, 5, 9, and 11)
- Vernon J. Mungo – engineering (tracks 2 and 8–10)
- N'dambi – background vocals (tracks 6, 10, and 12), composition (track 6), songwriting (track 6)
- Peter Nocello – viola (tracks 3 and 13)
- Pino Palladino – bass (tracks 1, 5, and 9), composition (track 1), electric guitar (track 14), production (tracks 1 and 9)
- Charles Parker – violin (tracks 3 and 13)
- James Poyser – additional drum programming (track 3), ARP String Ensemble (tracks 5 and 7), associate production, clavinet (tracks 1 and 7), composition (tracks 1, 3, 5, 8, and 14), Minimoog (tracks 2, 8, and 9), organ (track 1), piano (tracks 3, 5, and 14), production (tracks 1, 3, 5, 7–9, and 14), Rhodes piano (tracks 1–5, 7–9, and 14)
- Lyonel "Kay-K" Rosemond – additional A&R coordination
- Jacques Schwarz-Bart – saxophone (tracks 7 and 14)
- Charlene Sheppard-Duncan – personal assistance
- Simone/Whitfield – design
- Jon Smeltz – engineering (tracks 3 and 13)
- Rob Smith – engineering assistance (track 10)
- Tom Soares – engineering (tracks 1–5, 8–10, and 14), mixing (tracks 4, 6, 9, and 11)
- Eric Steiner – Pro Tools (tracks 3 and 4)
- Igor Szwec – violin (tracks 3 and 13)
- Gregory Teperman – violin (tracks 3 and 13)
- Ahmir "Questlove" Thompson – composition (track 1), drums (tracks 1, 4, 5, 7–9, and 14), production (tracks 1 and 9)
- Don Thompson – additional photography
- Kelly Thompson – A&R project coordination, product management
- Kierstan "TNT" Tucker – A&R project coordination
- Mike "Shaggy" Turner – engineering assistance (tracks 3, 8, 9, and 13)
- Michael Verdes – engineering assistance (tracks 4, 6, 7, and 12)
- Ward White IV – Appletree Cafe Inc. representation
- Mickey Whitfield – art direction
- Betty Wright – additional vocals (track 9), background vocals (track 8), composition (track 9), songwriting (track 9)
- Yahzarah – additional vocal harmonies (track 11), background vocals (tracks 1, 2, 6, 10, and 12)
- James "Jay Dee" Yancey – bass (tracks 7 and 8), composition (track 8), drum programming (track 3), production (tracks 2, 3, and 8), programming (track 2)
- Andre "Dr. Dre" Young – composition (track 12)
- Eugene "Snooky" Young – composition (track 10)
- Geno "Junebugg" Young – background vocals (tracks 6, 10, and 12), production (track 13), Rhodes piano (track 12)
- Krystof Zizka – engineering assistance (track 3)

== Charts ==
=== Weekly charts ===
2000–2001 weekly chart performance
Chart	Peak position
Australian Albums (ARIA)	112
Austrian Albums (Ö3 Austria)	56
Canadian Albums (Nielsen SoundScan)	30
Canadian R&B Albums (Nielsen SoundScan)	6
Dutch Albums (Album Top 100)	7
Finnish Albums (Suomen virallinen lista)	9
French Albums (SNEP)	42
German Albums (Offizielle Top 100)	42
Italian Albums (FIMI)	44
Japanese Albums (Oricon)	24
Norwegian Albums (VG-lista)	20
Polish Albums (ZPAV)	31
Swedish Albums (Sverigetopplistan)	19
Swiss Albums (Schweizer Hitparade)	33
UK Albums (Official Charts)	76
UK R&B Albums (Official Charts)	11
US Billboard 200	11
US Top R&B/Hip-Hop Albums (Billboard)	3

2025 weekly chart performance
Chart	Peak position
Greek Albums (IFPI)	50

=== Year-end charts ===
2001 year-end chart performance
Chart	Position
Canadian R&B Albums (Nielsen SoundScan)	73
Dutch Albums (Album Top 100)	72
US Billboard 200	86
US Top R&B/Hip-Hop Albums (Billboard)	20

== Certifications ==
Certifications and sales
Region	Certification	Certified units/sales
Canada (Music Canada)	Gold	50,000^{^}
Denmark (IFPI Danmark)	Platinum	20,000^{‡}
Japan (RIAJ)	Gold	100,000^{^}
Netherlands (NVPI)	Gold	40,000^{^}
United Kingdom (BPI)	Gold	100,000^{‡}
United States (RIAA)	Platinum	1,000,000^{^}
^{^} Shipments figures based on certification alone.^{‡} Sales+streaming figures based on certification alone.

== Release history ==
Release dates and formats
Region	Date	Edition(s)	Format(s)	Label(s)	Ref.
Japan	November 18, 2000	Standard	CD	Universal	
United Kingdom	November 20, 2000	Standard	CD	Motown	
United States	November 21, 2000	Standard	Cassette; CD; vinyl	Motown	
Germany	November 27, 2000	Standard	CD	Universal	
Germany	March 12, 2001	Reissue	CD	Universal	
Belgium	July 9, 2001	Special	CD + enhanced CD	Universal	
Netherlands	July 9, 2001	Special	CD + enhanced CD	Universal	
Australia	July 8, 2014	Standard	Vinyl	Universal	
Germany	July 18, 2014	Standard	Vinyl	Universal	
France	July 28, 2014	Standard	Vinyl	Universal	
