= Icon: The Best of Erykah Badu =

ICON: The Best of Erykah Badu

Compilation album by Erykah Badu
- Released: August 31, 2010
- Recorded: Late 1990s, 2000s
- Genre: Neo soul; R&B; jazz; hip hop
- Label: Universal Motown
- Producer: Madukwu Chinwah, Erykah Badu, John Meredith, James Poyser; The Roots, Tone Scott; J Dilla, Raphael Saadiq; RC Williams, Rashad Smith, Norman Hurt, 9th Wonder

Erykah Badu chronology
New Amerykah Part Two (Return of the Ankh) (2010)	ICON: The Best of Erykah Badu (2010)

ICON: The Best of Erykah Badu is a compilation album by American R&B artist Erykah Badu, released in August 2010 under Universal Motown. It's the first compilation of Badu's hit songs throughout her music career. The collection consists of 12 hit songs, as "On & On", "Love of My Life", You Got Me with The Roots, "Tyrone" and "Bag Lady".

== Track listing ==
No.	Title	Length
1.	"On & On"	3:26
2.	"Next Lifetime"	6:46
3.	"Tyrone" (Live)	4:09
4.	"Appletree" (Live)	2:47
5.	"You Got Me" (featuring The Roots)	4:20
6.	"Southern Gul" (featuring Rahzel)	3:10
7.	"Bag Lady" (Cheeba Sac Mix)	4:10
8.	"Didn't Cha Know?"	3:59
9.	"Love of My Life (An Ode to Hip-Hop)" (featuring Common)	3:49
10.	"Back in the Day (Puff)"	4:46
11.	"Danger"	4:23
12.	"Honey"	4:30
