= But You Caint Use My Phone =

Mixtape by Erykah Badu
- Released: November 27, 2015
- Recorded: 2015
- Studios: The Badudio, World Witness Studios (Dallas, Texas)
- Genres: R&B; soul; electronic
- Length: 36:05
- Labels: Control Freaq; Motown
- Producers: Erykah Badu; Zach Witness; Aubrey Davis

Erykah Badu chronology
| New Amerykah Part Two (Return of the Ankh) (2010) | But You Caint Use My Phone (2015) | Before the World Blows (2026) |

But You Caint Use My Phone is a mixtape by American singer Erykah Badu. It was released on November 27, 2015, by Motown and Control Freaq. Following the release of New Amerykah Part Two (Return of the Ankh) (2010), Badu embarked on a five-year hiatus, during which she traveled to Africa in an attempt to record new music, though this never surfaced. After receiving a remix of "Bag Lady" from producer Zach Witness, Badu contacted him in order to record with him. Shortly thereafter, the pair met again and went to Witness's home in Dallas, Texas, and worked in his bedroom studio, where they recorded the mixtape in 11 days. The mixtape features appearances from rapper ItsRoutine and André 3000.

Described by Badu as "TRap & B", the mixtape takes influence from hip hop, R&B, jazz, and art rock, with lyrics that focus on the themes of communication, notably through phones, with lyrics that touch upon ideas of "missed connections, call waiting, answering machines". The mixtape debuted at number 14 on the Billboard 200, generating 35,000 album-equivalent units in its first week.

== Background ==
After releasing New Amerykah Part One (4th World War) (2008) and New Amerykah Part Two (Return of the Ankh) (2010), Badu was expected to release the third album in the series. However, Badu embarked on a five-year hiatus instead. In May 2013, Badu announced she was writing for her next project, but she was not placing a time constraint on it. In July 2014, Badu revealed she was still working on the album and had been recording in April in Africa, where she was "laying down drum tracks". She continued to reveal that prior to her trip to Africa she has meetings with her record label to set a deadline for the album. Later that year Badu expanded on the album, stating she was working with producer Flying Lotus, whom she met via Myspace years earlier; they later met in Los Angeles at guitarist Steve Wilson's house. The album's title is derived from the closing ad-lib line in Badu's "Call Tyrone": "But you can't use my phone".

== Recording ==
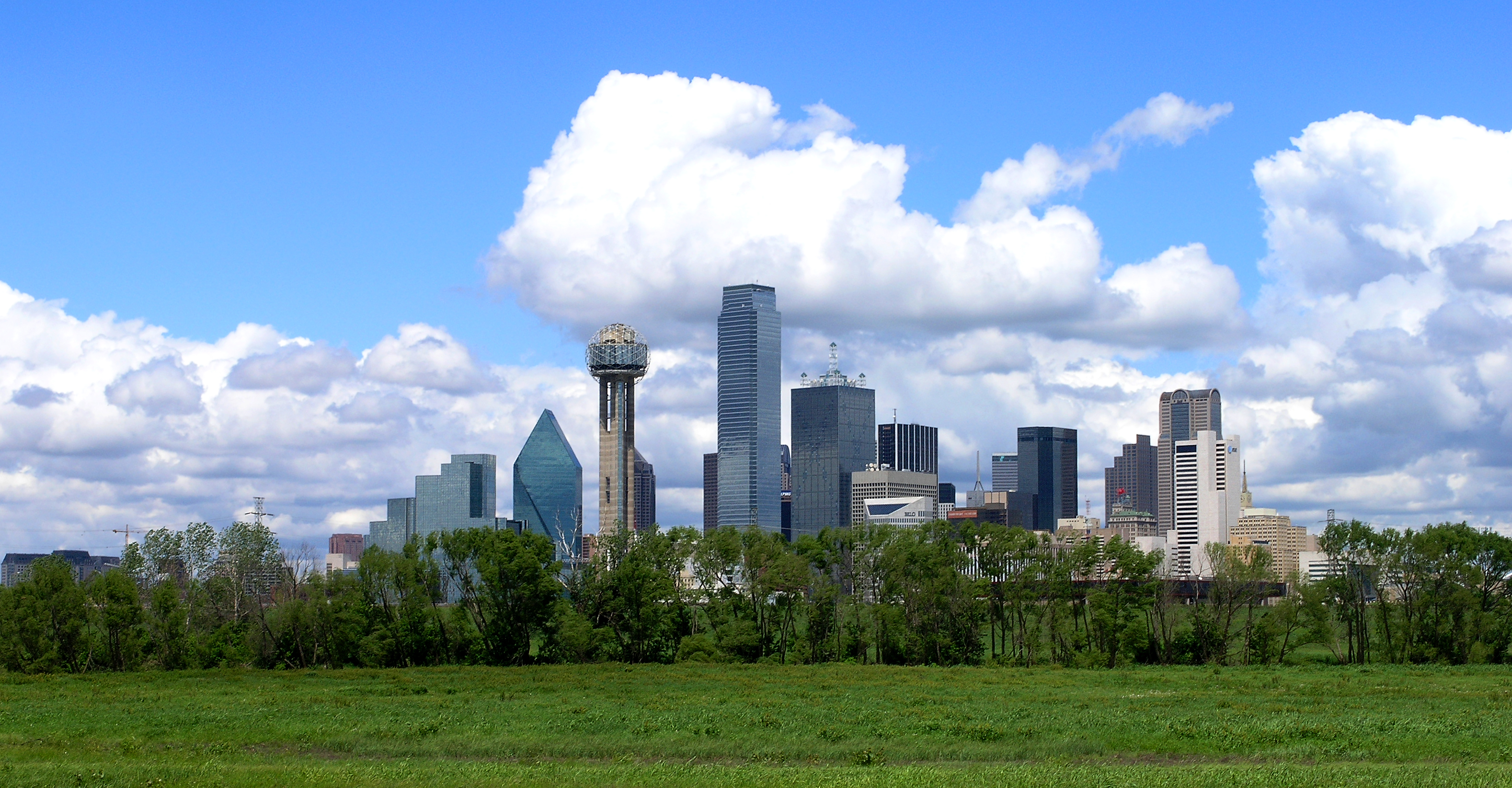
The mixtape was recorded over 11 days in Badu's hometown Dallas

The mixtape developed from a rewrite of rapper Drake's single "Hotline Bling", which Badu posted on SoundCloud. Zach Witness, also known as White Chocolate, was the mixtape's key producer. He did a remix of Badu's single "Bag Lady" and sent the remix through social media to Badu. Shortly thereafter, Badu decided to do a remix of Drake's 2015 single "Hotline Bling" and considered working with Witness. In the same week, Witness visited one of Badu's events where the pair exchanged numbers. The following week, the pair met again and went to Witness's home in Dallas, Texas, working in his bedroom studio.

The pair worked in his room for 11 days where they recorded the whole project; for two of the days Witness produced, reproduced, mixed, and mastered the project, while Badu recorded her vocals in one take for each song. The recording sessions were also visited by featured artists Drake, André 3000 and Aubrey Davis, where they coined the genre of the mixtape "TRap & B". During post-production, Badu and Witness focused on creating "sympathetic vibrations" between the music's frequency and vibration, utilizing a tuning fork and Tibetan singing bowls to find the precise wavelengths. Speaking on the post-production process, Badu stated, "It was fun, easy. I used tuning forks and singing bowls in the music in post production, just trying to create some frequencies that felt really good that I always use in all of my works. I wanted to make sure I implanted those things here too."

== Music and lyrics ==
Described by Badu as "TRap & B", she attempted to create "a sound that brings peace and tranquility to its listener." A press release for the mixtape described it as having "weaves" of Badu's soulful vocals with psychedelic soundscapes, hip hop-inflected beats, smooth R&B, jazz, and art rock. The mixtape focuses on the themes of communication, notably through phones, with lyrics that touch upon ideas of "missed connections, call waiting, answering machines".

But You Caint Use My Phone takes its title from a line in Badu's 1997 song "Tyrone". Themes of modern-day phone obsession appear throughout the project. Badu claims to have been "initiated into a new frequency" by listening to Toronto artists like Drake and The Weeknd, and felt incorporating that sound was "totally necessary for [her] evolution."

== Release and promotion ==
Badu released the mixtape on November 27, 2015, and made it available for digital download and streaming exclusively through Apple Music. After one week of exclusive release on iTunes, But You Caint Use My Phone was released to other digital retailers and streaming services on December 4, 2015. The mixtape was released without the knowledge of her label Universal, due to Badu releasing the record straight to iTunes. It also marked Badu's first release under her own record label, Control Freaq. Prior to the mixtape's release, Badu appeared on The Tonight Show on November 20, 2015, where she performed "Phone Down" and previewed new material in and out of commercial breaks. On November 25, 2016, a limited-edition LP of the mixtape was released as part of Record Store Day's Black Friday exclusive releases.

== Critical reception ==
Professional ratings
Review scores
| Source | Rating |
|---|---|
| AllMusic | 2.5/5 stars |
| Clash | 8/10 |
| Consequence of Sound | B |
| Exclaim! | 8/10 |
| Now | 4/5 |
| Pitchfork | 8.1/10 |
| Rolling Stone | 3.5/5 stars |
| Spin | 8/10 |
| Vice | (2-star Honorable Mention) |

But You Caint Use My Phone received generally positive reviews from music critics. At Metacritic, which assigns a normalized rating out of 100 to reviews from mainstream critics, the album received an average score of 74, based on nine reviews. Ryan Dombal of Pitchfork wrote that the mixtape "feels off-the-cuff, yet also steeped in history and wisdom." Kyle Mullin of Exclaim! praised it as "a fantastic collection of songs, and while Badu has dubbed the release a mixtape, it's as strong, cohesive and consistent as any proper soul LP put out in recent memory."

Parris O'Loughlin-Hoste of Clash commented, "Despite the continuing theme the mixtape is [sic] no way disappoints, exuding a level of excitement and appreciation of a body of work that Erykah displays both through music and her own style." Jason Gubbels of Spin opined that "what's most charming about But You Caint Use My Phone is how unpretentiously Badu comports herself, ever-mindful that one of her most special qualities as a vocalist remains her ability to entwine the resilient with the goofy." Kevin Ritchie of Now noted the mixtape's production as "experimental and improvisational but familiar", adding, "When [Badu] puts her psychedelic soul spin on the trappy drums of today (what she calls trap&B), it's the sound of an artist embracing change and all the new possibilities and complications that go with it."

Chuck Arnold of Rolling Stone felt that the mixtape "may be initially frustrating to those longing for a real album (and real, full songs), but it's full of rewards for deep listening." In a less enthusiastic review, Andy Kellman of AllMusic dubbed the mixtape "a trivial if fun diversion". Robert Christgau named "Dial'Afreaq" and "Hello" as highlights while writing in his column for Vice, "this free concept mini isn't the armed takedown of the distraction engine we need, but it's good to have those bee statistics out in memeland." Slant Magazine placed But You Caint Use My Phone at number 15 on its list of The 25 Best Albums of 2015, stating it is "the closest Badu has gotten to pure artistic improvisation since her underrated, amorphous jam session Worldwide Underground."

== Track listing ==
| No. | Title | Writer(s) | Producer(s) | Length |
|---|---|---|---|---|
| 1. | "Caint Use My Phone (Suite)" | Erykah Badu; Zach Witness | | 3:34 |
| 2. | "Hi" | Badu; Todd Rundgren | Badu; Witness | 0:35 |
| 3. | "Cel U Lar Device" | Aubrey Graham; Paul Jefferies; Timmy Thomas | Badu; Witness | 6:28 |
| 4. | "Phone Down" | Badu; Aubrey Davis; Witness; Jeremy Rose | Badu; Witness | 3:28 |
| 5. | "U Use to Call Me" (featuring ItsRoutine) | Davis; Graham | Davis | 1:13 |
| 6. | "Mr. Telephone Man" | Ray Parker Jr. | Badu; Witness | 3:11 |
| 7. | "U Don't Have to Call" | Badu; Pharrell Williams; Chad Hugo | Witness | 2:00 |
| 8. | "What's Yo Phone Number / Telephone (Ghost of Screw Mix)" | Badu; Witness; Seven Benjamin; James Poyser; Ahmir Thompson | Badu; Witness | 5:10 |
| 9. | "Dial'Afreaq" | Badu; Witness; Greg Broussard; Roger Clayton | Badu; Witness | 3:10 |
| 10. | "I'll Call U Back" | Badu; Witness; Thomas | Badu; Witness | 1:57 |
| 11. | "Hello" (featuring André 3000) | Badu; André Benjamin; Witness; Rundgren | Badu; Witness | 5:19 |
| Total length: | | | | 36:05 |

Sample credits

- "Hi" and "Hello" contain replayed elements of "Hello It's Me", written and performed by Todd Rundgren.
- "Phone Down" contains elements of "Loss Config.", written and performed by Zodiac.
- "U Don't Have to Call" contains re-sung elements from "U Don't Have to Call", written by Pharrell Williams and Chad Hugo, and performed by Usher.
- "What's Yo Phone Number / Telephone (Ghost of Screw Mix)" contains elements from "Telephone", written by James Poyser, Ahmir Thompson and Erica Wright, and performed by Erykah Badu.
- "I'll Call U Back" contains replayed elements from "Why Can't We Live Together", written and performed by Timmy Thomas.
- "Cel U Lar Device" contains replayed elements from "Hotline Bling", written and performed by Aubrey Graham.

== Personnel ==
Credits adapted from the liner notes of the Record Store Day exclusive LP release of But You Caint Use My Phone.

- Erykah Badu – vocals (all tracks); production (tracks 2–4, 6, 8–11); agogô bells (tracks 3, 7, 9); executive production
- André 3000 – vocals (track 11)
- Aubrey Davis – production, programming (track 5)
- ItsRoutine – vocals (track 5, 7, 8)
- FreeqLab Studio – art direction, design
- Ben Hixon – guitar (tracks 2, 3, 10, 11)
- Robert Vosgien – mastering
- RC Williams – Rhodes (tracks 2, 11)
- Zach Witness – engineering, mixing (all tracks); drums (tracks 2, 11); production, programming (tracks 2–4, 6–11); Rhodes (tracks 3, 10)
- Ethan Worland – drums (tracks 3, 10)

== Charts ==
=== Weekly charts ===
Weekly chart performance for But You Caint Use My Phone
| Chart (2015) | Peak position |
|---|---|
| Belgian Albums (Ultratop Flanders) | 153 |
| Canadian Albums (Billboard) | 96 |
| UK R&B Albums (Official Charts) | 19 |
| US Billboard 200 | 14 |
| US Top R&B/Hip-Hop Albums (Billboard) | 2 |

=== Year-end charts ===
Year-end chart performance for But You Caint Use My Phone
| Chart (2016) | Position |
|---|---|
| US Top R&B/Hip-Hop Albums (Billboard) | 61 |
