= Before the World Blows =

Studio album by Erykah Badu and the Alchemist
- Released: August 28, 2026
- Recorded: 2024–2026
- Genres: Neo-soul; hip-hop
- Length: 62:52
- Labels: Control Freaq; Young
- Producers: The Alchemist; Erykah Badu; Mike Chavarria; Jay Electronica

Erykah Badu chronology
But You Caint Use My Phone (2015)	Before the World Blows (2026)

The Alchemist chronology
Better Than McDonald's (2026)	Before the World Blows (2026)

Singles from Before the World Blows
- 1. "Witch Doctor" Released: August 13, 2026

Before the World Blows is a collaborative studio album by the American singer Erykah Badu and record producer the Alchemist. It was released on August 28, 2026, by Control Freaq and Young. The album merges Badu's use of melodic and atmospheric compositions with the Alchemist's sampling techniques. It marks Badu's first project in eleven years, following the mixtape But You Caint Use My Phone (2015).

Badu met the Alchemist during her annual Birthday Bash in Dallas, with both having interest in working with each other beforehand. The Alchemist learned about Badu's production approach by using her instruments into his sample-based beats. The duo recorded and produced the album in the span of over eighteen months in Dallas and Los Angeles.

In promotion of the album in 2025, Badu and the Alchemist released its initial lead single "Next to You", previewed the track "Echos 19 (mix 122)", performed three shows in Japan, and went on The Abi & Alan Tour, with all performances being phone-free. The album was initially set for release on August 29 but was postponed as the Alchemist denied it would release that day. The album resumed promotion the following year with a new release date and the release of its lead single "Witch Doctor". Badu and the Alchemist embarked on a North American tour with De La Soul and Smino in September 2026.

== Background ==
Erykah Badu met the Alchemist during her annual Birthday Bash in Dallas that began in 2013, which featured guests including Yasiin Bey, Dave Chappelle, and former partner André 3000. The Alchemist is a hip-hop record producer known for his boom bap revivalist-style, producing for artists including Freddie Gibbs, Boldy James, Armand Hammer, Roc Marciano, Earl Sweatshirt, Conway the Machine, Action Bronson, and Mike. Badu first connected with the Alchemist because she wanted to rap over the instrumental from Mobb Deep's "The Realest" (1999), which The Alchemist produced.

Prior to their collaborative album, Badu's latest project was the mixtape But You Caint Use My Phone (2015), and had not released a studio album since New Amerykah Part Two (Return of the Ankh) (2010). At the time of the collaborative album's announcement, Badu had recently featured on Jamie xx's "F.U." (2025) and received her fifth Grammy Award for her featured appearance on Rapsody's "3:AM" (2024).

== Development and production ==
In September 2025, during Badu and the Alchemist's appearance on Drink Champs, The Alchemist revealed that they produced the album together, and compared learning from Badu's approach to his experience with DJ Muggs from when he was a teenager. The Alchemist was interested in working with Badu for years prior to meeting.

After their initial meeting, the Alchemist sent Badu various instrumental beats, in which Badu brought her instruments into The Alchemist's samples. They recorded the tracks in person and split time in their personal studios from Los Angeles and Dallas for several months. In addition to production, from 2024 to 2025, the duo tested the album live in "intimate, phone-free settings", with Badu performing with her backing band the Cannibinoids and the Alchemist on the MPC. The Alchemist stated he was nervous when performing with Badu and the Cannabinoids, which lean on improvisation and intuition. Badu encouraged the Alchemist to perform with the MPC, having never used it on stage before.

The album was recorded and produced in the span of over eighteen months in Dallas and Los Angeles, and features seventeen tracks.

== Composition ==
=== Overview ===
According to a press release, Before the World Blows "moves from soul, blues, funk, rock, jazz, and underground hip-hop." The album blends the two's distinctive styles, with the Alchemist's discovery and manipulation of samples, and Badu's use of "melodic, beautiful and atmospheric" compositions.

=== Tracks ===
"Witch Doctor" is a "hypnotic zone-out" that runs for six minutes and a half, where Badu sings about breaking someone's curse because she's a "witch, oooh, doctor". In the middle of the track, she lists various witches that she does not represent: Elphaba, Glinda, Ursula, Sabrina, Maleficent, Stevie Nicks, Broom-Hilda, and Agatha. The Alchemist's "slow, heady beat" evolves the track Into a "campfire drum circle."

== Promotion and release ==
=== 2025 ===
It was reported in January 2025 that Badu was working on a collaborative album with the Alchemist, with the latter describing it as "life-altering." They previewed a snippet, seemingly titled "Valentine", on Instagram the following month. Badu officially announced the project on March 19, during an interview with Billboard. On June 5, she announced that the album would soon release under her own record label Control Freaq.

On June 20, 2025, Badu and the Alchemist released the single "Next to You" to streaming services, following the former's performance in Dallas the previous night, which was live streamed as part of Amazon Music's Juneteenth special Forever in Rotation. The single samples Mobb Deep's "The Realest" (1999), which was also produced by the Alchemist. It was initially the lead single for their collaborative album, which was originally titled Abi & Alan. "Next to You" quickly received criticism on social media for its AI-generated album artwork, also resembling the album cover for Sonic Youth's Goo (1990). The Alchemist later responded to the criticism with "humor, sarcasm, and a few philosophical jabs" on X. The duo additionally previewed another track titled "Echos 19 (mix 122)".

Shortly after release of "Next to You", Badu and the Alchemist performed three shows at KT Zepp Yokohama in Japan throughout June 24 to 30, 2025. On the former day, the duo announced The Abi & Alan Tour, which began on August 8, in Seattle and concluded on August 24, in Austin. Presale for tickets of the concerts were provided by using the code Abi122, with general on-sale being made available on June 27. On August 1, it was revealed that Badu and the Alchemist would preview Abi & Alan exclusively on their tour. Attendees were required by security to place their cellphones in locked pouches.

The album was initially set for release on August 29, 2025. However, the day before it was set for release, Badu announced that the album was postponed. The Alchemist would also deny announcing the release date for Abi & Alan, despite promotional material listing the date. On August 30, the duo appeared on Drink Champs. On September 27, the track list for the album surfaced online, which featured guest appearances from Westside Gunn, Thundercat, DRAM, Earl Sweatshirt, and Kamasi Washington.

=== 2026 ===
On June 24, 2026, following no announcements concerning the album for nearly a year, Badu announced a North American concert tour with the Alchemist, De La Soul, and Smino. The tour began on September 10, at Highland Park, and concluded on September 29, in Los Angeles. Additionally, in July, Badu performed four shows in Japan, and on August 9, performed at the Richmond Jazz and Music Festival.

On August 13, 2026, Badu and the Alchemist officially announced that their collaborative album would be released on August 28, through Control Freaq and Young, under the tentative title Sorry, We Don't Have an Album Title Yet.... The same day, they released the lead single "Witch Doctor". They would later announce a website where the symbols on the cover could be decoded, revealing the final title as Before the World Blows. On August 17, Badu and the Alchemist released the music video for "Witch Doctor", with consists of a running time of ten minutes.

== Critical reception ==
Professional ratings
Review scores
Source	Rating
Financial Times	3/5 stars
NME	4.5/5 stars
Pitchfork	7.5/10
Rolling Stone	4/5 stars
The Needle Drop	6/10

Will Dukes of Rolling Stone wrote that Before the World Blows "plays to both of their strengths and delivers exactly what fans have been waiting for". A.D. Amorosi of Flood Magazine praised the combination of Badu's vocals and the Alchemist's production, highlighting her melodies and songwriting. Writing for The Wall Street Journal, Mark Richardson described the album as "eccentric and often mesmerizing" and regarded it as a substantial collaboration, noting Badu's contributions to its production, instrumentation, arrangements and mixing. In a release-day article for HotNewHipHop, Alexander Cole described the album as "a gorgeous blending of sounds". Alice Vyvyan-Jones of DJ Mag likened the album to an extended studio jam, with the pair "trading sounds with an almost telepathic chemistry". Billboard's, Angel Diaz described the music as an "immersive experience" and praised the Alchemist's versatility.

Ludovic Hunter-Tilney of the Financial Times highlighted Badu's vocal range, describing the production as "flickering and shadowy". Kiana Mickles of Pitchfork described the album as "seductive" and "pleasantly rambly", praising the duo's production while finding its middle section less engaging.

Anthony Fantano of The Needle Drop offered a more reserved assessment, praising Badu's vocals and the Alchemist's production, while feeling that the songwriting needed further refinement, with some of the tracks underdeveloped and others overly long.

== Track listing ==
All lyrics are written by Erykah Badu, except where noted.

Before the World Blows track listing
No.	Title	Lyrics	Music	Length
1.	"Echos"		Erykah Badu; The Alchemist	7:22
2.	"I Just Play a Part" (featuring DJ Creole Princess, Westside Gunn, and Joi)	Badu; DJ Creole Princess	Badu; The Alchemist; DJ Creole Princess; Teo Macero	4:22
3.	"Crossfade"		Badu; The Alchemist; S. Kamala Bloom; Calvin Keys; BJ William	5:33
4.	"Witch Doctor"	Badu; Rob Free	Badu; The Alchemist; Wojciech Karolak	6:26
5.	"Valentine" (featuring DRAM)	Badu; DRAM	Badu; The Alchemist; Smead Hudman; Austin Johnson	2:28
6.	"Next 2 U"		Barbara Gaskins	2:58
7.	"Love Me Not"		Raymond Davies; Mars Merkaba	4:13
8.	"Breezy"		Badu; The Alchemist; Elbernita Clark	3:22
9.	"Abracadabra"	Jay Electronica	Mike Chavarria; Jay Electronica	1:03
10.	"To the Moon (Plan C)" (featuring Steve Lacy)	Badu; Steve Lacy	Badu; The Alchemist; Wilhelmus Koopman; Lacy; Anton Scherpenzeel	4:16
11.	"They Ain't You" (featuring Thundercat)		Badu; The Alchemist	4:49
12.	"What the People Say (Apostle 1)"		Badu; The Alchemist; Zoltán Nemeth; Iván Szenes	2:32
13.	"Hot BiBi (Apostle 2)"		Badu; The Alchemist; Shafiq Husayn; Om'Mas Keith; Nemeth; Szenes	2:05
14.	"No I.D." (featuring Westside Gunn)	Badu; Westside Gunn	Badu; The Alchemist; Karolak	3:52
15.	"I Know That Man" (featuring Earl Sweatshirt)	Badu; Earl Sweatshirt	Badu; The Alchemist; Oma Drake	3:15
16.	"Black Box" (featuring Kamasi Washington)		Badu; The Alchemist; Mickey Baker; Alex Sanders	4:16
Total length:				62:52

== Personnel ==
Credits are adapted from Tidal.

=== Musicians ===
- Erykah Badu – vocals, arrangement (all tracks); programming (tracks 1–6, 8–14, 16), kalimba (1, 2), Mellotron (3, 4), percussion (6, 8), handclaps (15)
- The Alchemist – programming (all tracks), percussion (2), handclaps (15)
- DJ Quik – percussion
- RC Williams – synthesizer (2), keyboards (8, 12, 13), piano (15)
- Westside Gunn – vocals (2, 14)
- Joi Gilliam – vocals (2, 16)
- Josef Leimberg – trombone (2)
- DJ Creole Princess – vocals (2)
- Thundercat – bass guitar (3, 4, 11)
- Amen Khum Ra – vocals (3)
- Carlos Perez – vocals (4), handclaps (15)
- Frank Moka – percussion (4)
- Rob Free – vocals (4)
- Cold Cris – vocals (5), handclaps (15)
- DRAM – vocals (5, 16)
- Jay Electronica – programming (9)
- Mike Chavarria – programming (9), handclaps (15)
- Steve Lacy – bass guitar (10)
- Young Guru – handclaps (15)
- Jack Miller – handclaps (15)
- Randy Brown – handclaps (15)
- Earl Sweatshirt – vocals (15)
- Kamasi Washington – saxophone (16)

=== Technical ===
- Erykah Badu – production, mixing
- The Alchemist – production
- Mike Chavarria – production, engineering, mixing
- Young Guru – engineering, mixing
- Zach Witness – engineering
- Chris Godbey – mixing
- Leslie Brathwaite – mixing
- Dave Kutch – mastering
- Jay Electronica – production (9)

== Charts ==
Chart performance for Before the World Blows
Chart (2026)	Peak position
Swiss Albums (Schweizer Hitparade)	50
UK Album Downloads (Official Charts)	10
UK Independent Albums (Official Charts)	47
UK R&B Albums (Official Charts)	7
US Independent Albums (Billboard)	32
US & Canadian College Radio Top 200 (NACC)	21
