= Emotional baggage =

Idiom

Emotional baggage is an idiom that generally refers to unresolved psychological trauma such as stressors, trust issues, fears, paranoia, guilt, regret, despair or grief that are usually detrimental to one's overall mental well-being and social relationships. The unresolved trauma can be rooted in issues such as emotional abuse, childhood trauma or prior stressful events.

As a metaphor, the term refers to one's carrying of the collective emotional load of the past into the present moment.

== Adult life ==
In adult life, emotional baggage comes to the fore in relationships in two main forms.

- First, there are the often negative expectations created by previous relationships, perhaps of an abusive nature—a kind of bondage to the past that can contaminate new and potentially more positive interactions. This may be particularly apparent in a second marriage where, in Virginia Satir's words, “shadows from the past are very real and must be dealt with by the new marital pair”.
- The second type of memory contributing to adult emotional baggage are recurrent bringing-up of the history of the current relationship, with the result that minor problems in the present become overwhelmed by negative currents from earlier times which cannot be resolved or set aside for good.

== Childhood ==
Behind adult problems, however, there may be deeper forms of emotional baggage rooted in the experiences of childhood, but continuing to trouble personality and behavior within the adult.

Men and women may be unable to leave the pain of childhood behind, and look to their partners to fix this, rather than to address more adult concerns.

Cultural and parental expectations and patterns of behavior drawn from the family of origin and still unconsciously carried around, will impact a new marriage in ways neither partner may be aware of.

Similarly, as parents, both sexes may find their own childhood pasts hampering their efforts at more constructive child-rearing, whether they repeat, or seek to overcompensate for, parental patterns of the past.

Psychotherapy addresses such emotional baggage of the client under the rubric of transference, exploring how early development can create an internalized 'working mode' through which all subsequent relationships are viewed; while the concept of countertransference on the therapist's part acknowledges that they too can bring their own emotional baggage into the analytic relationship.

== See also ==
- Backstory
- Personal equation
- Repetition compulsion
- Self-fulfilling prophecy
