= Soulquarians =

American musical collective

The Soulquarians
- Soulquarians in 2000 for Vibe Magazine; Left to right: Black Star, Common (kneeling), James Poyser, Erykah Badu, Questlove, D'Angelo, Q-Tip, J Dilla (kneeling), Bilal

Background information
- Origin: New York City, U.S.
- Genres: Soul; hip hop; avant-garde; jazz
- Years active: Late 1990s – early 2000s
- Spinoffs: Black Star; The Soultronics
- Spinoff of: Native Tongues
- Past members: Erykah Badu; Bilal; Common; D'Angelo; Roy Hargrove; Black Star; Pino Palladino; James Poyser; Q-Tip; Questlove; J Dilla

The Soulquarians were a rotating collective of experimental Black music artists active during the late 1990s and early 2000s. Initially, they were formed by singer and multi-instrumentalist D'Angelo, drummer and producer Questlove, and producer-rapper J Dilla. They were later joined by singer-songwriter Erykah Badu, trumpeter Roy Hargrove, keyboardist James Poyser, singer Bilal, bassist Pino Palladino, rapper-producers Q-Tip and Mos Def, and rappers Talib Kweli and Common. Prior to its formation, Q-Tip, Common, Mos Def, and Talib Kweli were members of the Native Tongues collective, whilst Q-Tip's original group A Tribe Called Quest served as one of the inspirations behind the Soulquarians.

Stylistically, the collective's music has been variously described as neo soul, alternative hip hop, progressive soul, avant-garde, soul, conscious rap, and jazz fusion. Their members often collaborated on each other's recordings, holding extensive and innovative sessions at Electric Lady Studios in New York, which produced several well-received albums. Questlove, of the hip hop band The Roots, acted as the "musical powerhouse" behind several of the collective's projects, including The Roots' Things Fall Apart (1999), D'Angelo's Voodoo (2000), Badu's Mama's Gun (2000), and Common's Like Water for Chocolate (2000). Reflecting on their recordings, Common told Spin in 2008: "It was one of those time periods that you don't even realize when you're going through it that it's powerful".

== Formation ==
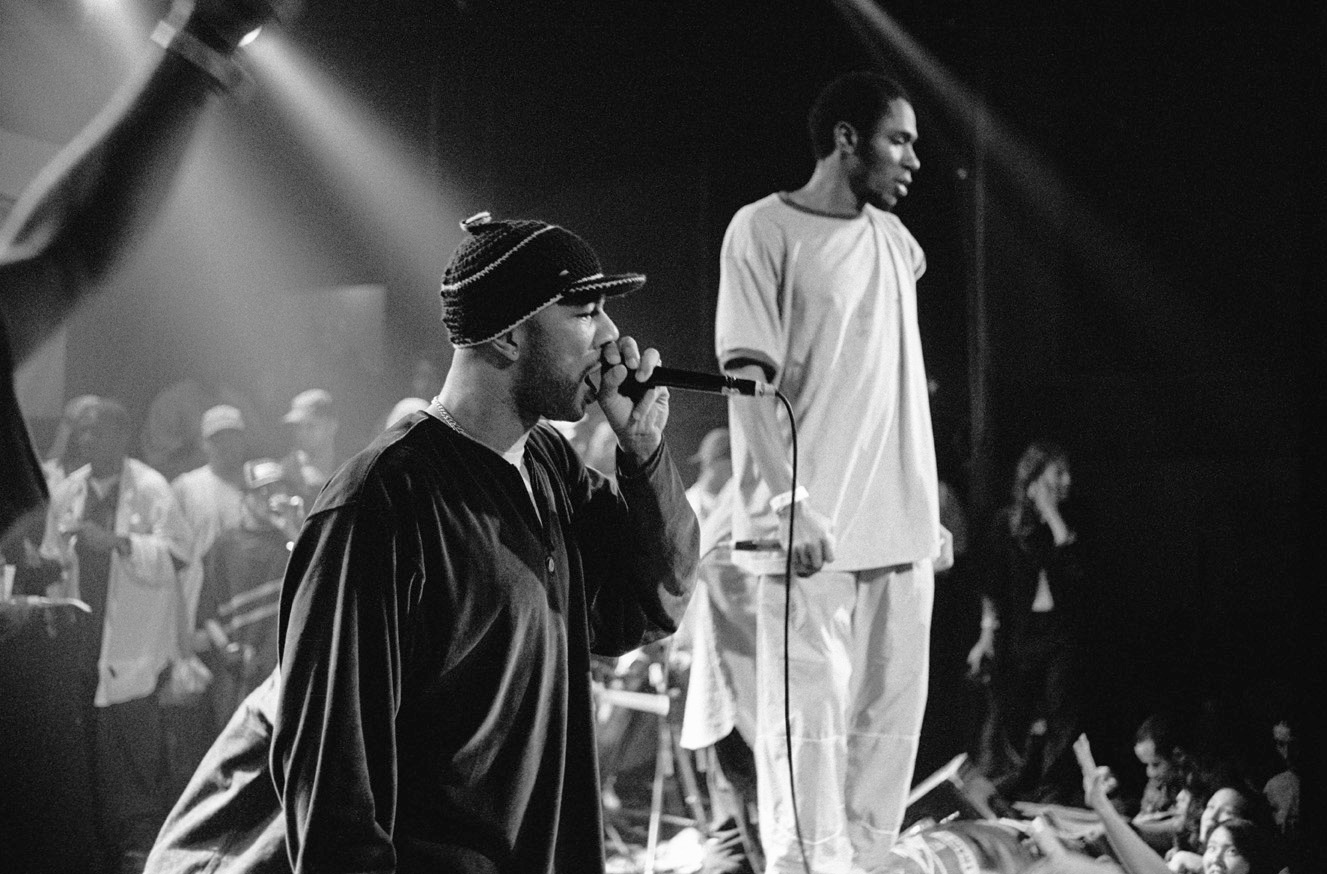
Soulquarians members Common (left) and Mos Def (right) performing in 1999

The name of the collective is derived from an astrology sign Aquarius, which is the shared birth sign of the founding members of the collective: Questlove from the Roots, D'Angelo, James Poyser, and J Dilla. Questlove, D'Angelo, Poyser, and J Dilla came together after discovering they had a common interest for the unconventional—offbeat rhythms, irregular chords, and other traits often exhibited by the underground urban music scene. The 1995 Source Awards were a pivotal moment in the founding, with the event highlighting tensions within the hip-hop community at the time and featuring a chance encounter between Questlove and D'Angelo.

Also around this time, D'Angelo and Welsh bassist Pino Palladino developed a connection over their mutual love of Motown and other classic soul music. Palladino then became active in the Soulquarians, playing on the majority of their discography and serving as a member of the Soultronics touring band that supported D'Angelo's Voodoo tour. Another influence on the Soulquarians was the 1990s hip hop group A Tribe Called Quest; rapper and producer Q-Tip was the leader of said group.

Many of these artists have performed on one another's records, creating a community of likeminded musicians forging a style that doesn't have a name yet. Organic soul, natural R&B, boho-rap—it's music that owes a debt to the old-school sounds of Marvin Gaye, Bob Marley, Jimi Hendrix and George Clinton without expressly mimicking any of them. It refreshes these traditions with cinematic production techniques gleaned from hip-hop and with attitude that is street-smart but above all highly individual, celebrating quirks instead of sanding them down for mass consumption. Instead of crooning about "booty and blunts" (sex, drugs, etc.), the subject matter on these albums is idiosyncratic and personal, ranging from the spiritual crises of [Lauryn] Hill, D'Angelo and Maxwell to the socio-political concerns of the Roots and Mos Def.

— Greg Kot

== Recording at Electric Lady ==
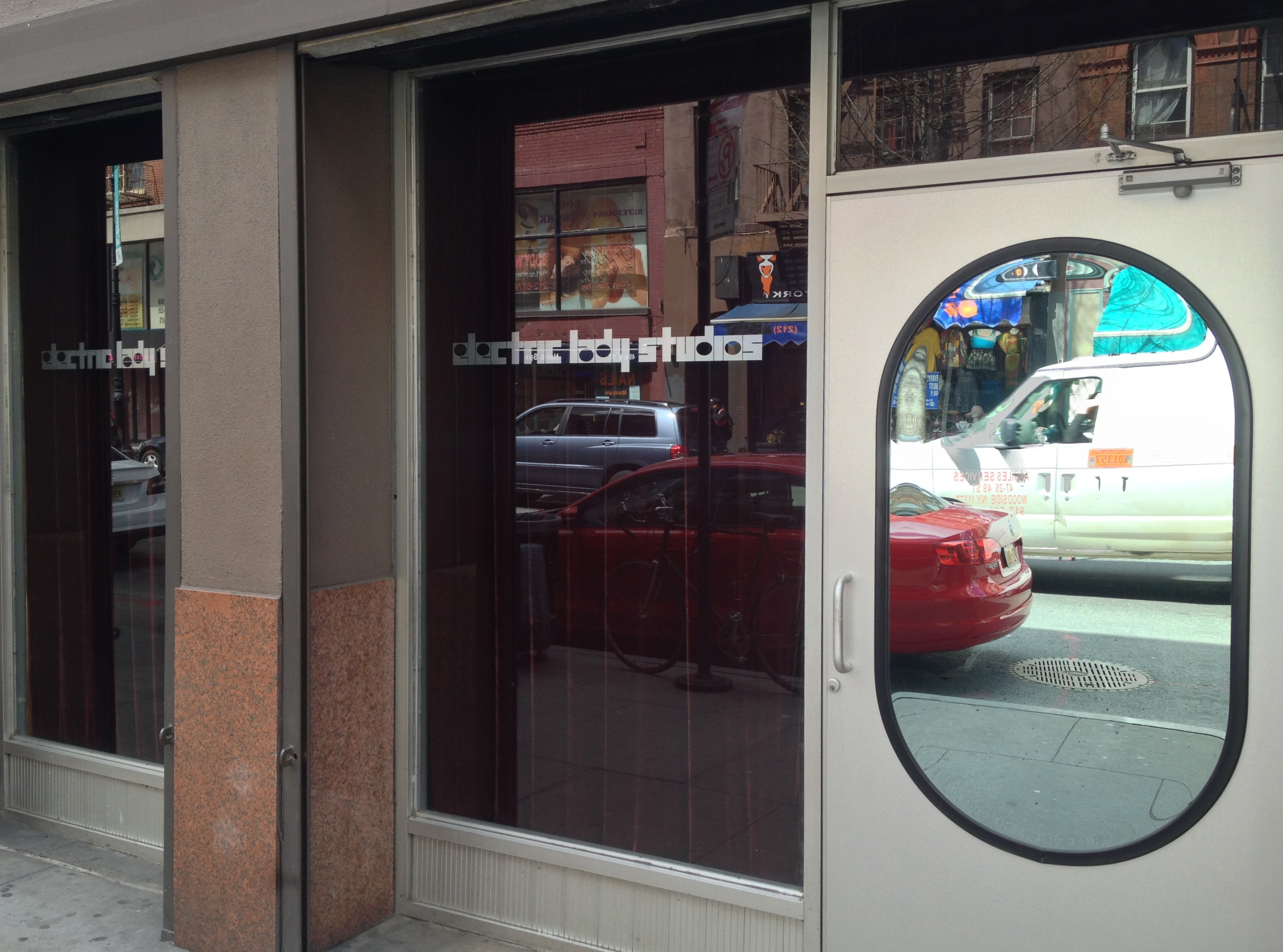
Electric Lady Studios in 2013

During the late 1990s and early 2000s, members of the collective held jam sessions while recording their respective albums at Electric Lady Studios in New York. The studio was chosen due to its history, having previously been used by Jimi Hendrix and Stevie Wonder, amongst others, and for the collection of vintage equipment available. It also presented new challenges for Questlove, who had to learn how to play drums in a softer style. Some of the equipment used included a Ludwig drum kit from 1968 and bass guitars from the 1950s.

Recording sessions began in 1997 when D'Angelo and Questlove prepared to record the former's Voodoo (2000) album at the studio. According to Russell Elevado, the engineer on Voodoo, they used over 200 reels of tape to record in 1997 alone.

The collective's sessions there over the next five years resulted in the Roots' albums Things Fall Apart (1999) and Phrenology (2002), Badu's second album Mama's Gun (2000), Common's Like Water for Chocolate (2000) and Electric Circus (2002), and singer Bilal's debut album 1st Born Second. According to music journalist Michael Gonzales, their sessions were marked by an experimentation with "dirty soul, muddy water blues, Black Ark dub science, mix-master madness, screeching guitars, old school hip-hop, gutbucket romanticism, inspired lyricism, African chats and aesthetics, pimpin' politics, strange Moogs, Kraftwerk synths and spacey noise". The musical approach also influenced the collective's associated musicians, including Mos Def's Black on Both Sides (1999), singer Res's How I Do (2001), and rapper Talib Kweli's Quality (2002).

Questlove served as what Jim DeRogatis called "the musical powerhouse" behind the collective's sessions at the studio. "I tried to do all in my power that I could to bring people together – to bring Common to Electric Lady, have him record here whenever so that he could record with some of these other artists", Questlove explained in 2002. "You'd just come into [the studio's] A Room, you don't even know who has a session, but you call me: 'Who's down there?' 'Common's in there today.' So you come down, you order some food, sit down and bullshit, watch a movie, and then it's, 'Let's play something.' And I say, 'Who wants this [track]?' And it would be, 'I want it!' 'No, I want it!'"

== Demise and legacy ==
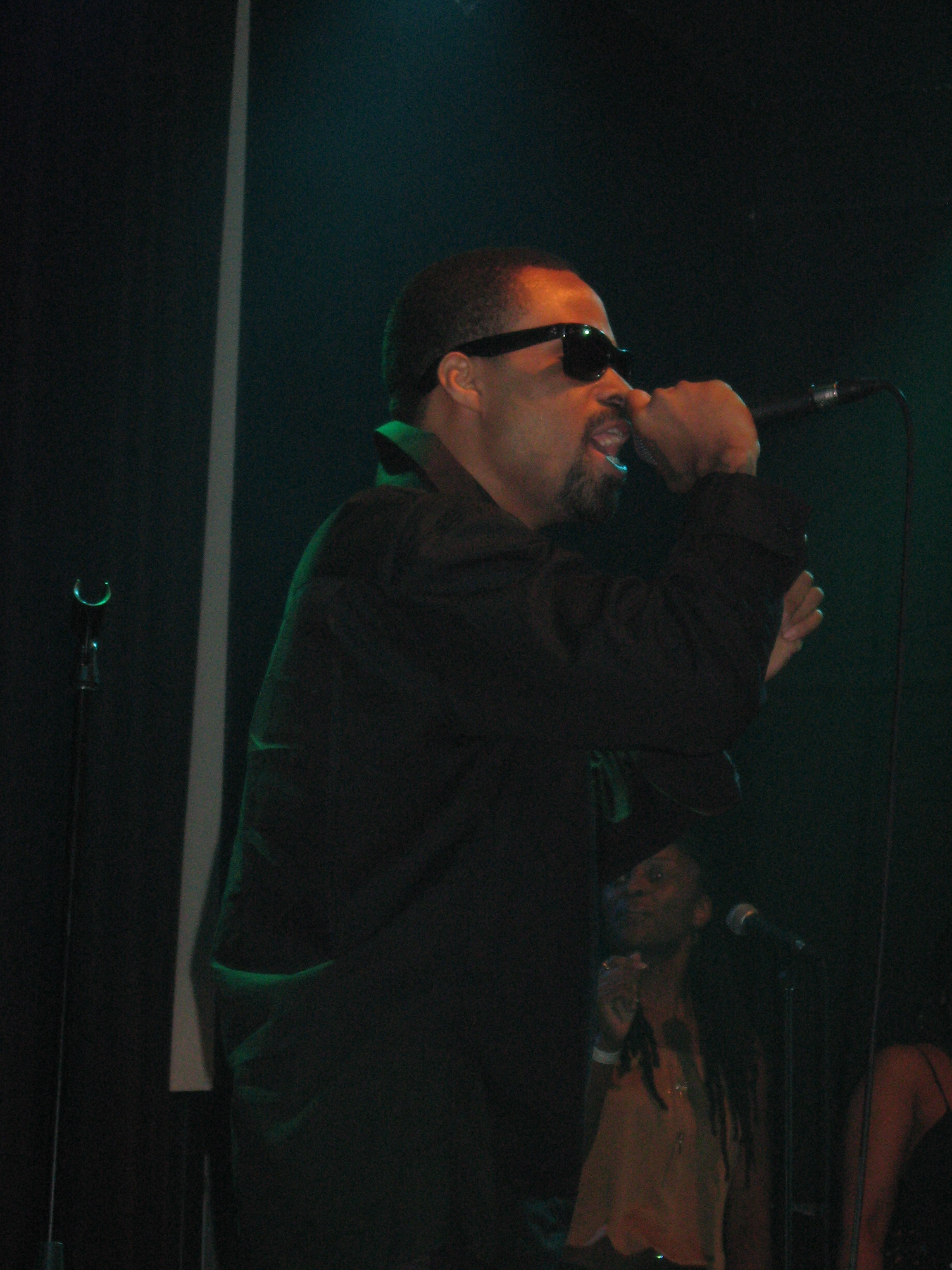
Bilal in 2007

The Soulquarians' period at the studio ended due in part to the experimental nature of some of their recordings becoming commercial liabilities. Bilal held improvisatory jam sessions at the studio for his second album, Love for Sale, but its experimental direction alienated his label from releasing it. Common's similarly experimental Electric Circus sold disappointingly, which discouraged MCA Records, Common and the Roots' label, from letting the artistically free environment at the studio continue.

Speaking about the end of The Soulquarians, in 2015, Questlove blamed a September 2000 magazine photo and article from Vibe as part of the reason for their eventual split:

The Vibe magazine photo was the beginning of the end. Because when that issue came out, motherfuckers were angry. The issue started out as a feature about me. The people at Vibe had a clue that I was working on D'Angelo, Erykah, The Roots, Jill Scott, Bilal, Mos Def, Talib Kweli, Common, Slum Village, and Nikka Costa's records. At the height of everything, I was working with 17 different artists. I was really gun shy on any unwelcomed praise. I came from a commune. It wasn't a one man act. I was very uncomfortable accepting a title or praise. I insisted to Vibe that they could get the story, but they had to make it about the family and not one person. The thing was we never had a title, but because the journalist was hanging with us the whole time, they were like you guys keep saying Soulquarians all of the time. I explained the difference. I said that the Soulquarians were me, James, D'Angelo, and J Dilla. The Soultronics was the group we were putting together with D'Angelo. So when we took the photo and then I saw the Vibe cover it said The Soulquarians. I was in Chicago when I saw it, and I said, "Oh shit. This is bad." The next thing you know, every phone call that came in people were saying, "Yo, man. It looks like I'm working for you. I'm not an Aquarian. I'm my own person." Literally, that's when it all fell apart.

In 2003, Questlove unequivocally stated that there were no plans for a Soulquarians album release for the foreseeable future. This was interpreted as a silent breakup of the outfit. However, according to an interview with Common (circa 2005), the collective continued to exist. In February 2006, founding member J Dilla died of cardiac arrest after prior health issues. That same year, Bilal's Love for Sale leaked and was indefinitely shelved by his label, although it developed an underground following and wide acclaim over the years. Reflecting on the collective's impact since then, Gonzales writes in 2015:

Without a doubt, the innovations the Soulquarians put down in that five-year period between 1997 and 2002 became eternal, their spirit still alive inside of us, their sound and vision later manifested into the work of photographers, writers, visual artists, indie directors and of course, musicians and rappers. Listening to ... Kendrick Lamar's newest album To Pimp a Butterfly, Bilal has transformed himself into an arty Nate Dogg for the post-Soulquarian generation that includes Robert Glasper, Esperanza Spalding and, now, Kendrick.

== Members ==
- Questlove – drums, keyboards, percussion, production
- D'Angelo – vocals, keyboards, guitar, production
- J Dilla – vocals, drum programming, production
- James Poyser – keyboards, production
- Erykah Badu – vocals, production
- Q-Tip – vocals, production
- Bilal – vocals
- Common – vocals
- Mos Def – vocals
- Talib Kweli – vocals
- Pino Palladino – bass
- Roy Hargrove – trumpet, flugelhorn

== Discography ==
Albums produced wholly or partly by the Soulquarians:

Year	Artist	Album	RIAA Certification
1999	The Roots	Things Fall Apart	Platinum
1999	Mos Def	Black on Both Sides	Gold
1999	Q-Tip	Amplified	Gold
2000	D'Angelo	Voodoo	Platinum
2000	Common	Like Water for Chocolate	Gold
2000	Slum Village	Fantastic, Vol. 2	—N/a
2000	Reflection Eternal	Train of Thought	—N/a
2000	Erykah Badu	Mama's Gun	Platinum
2001	J Dilla	Welcome 2 Detroit	—N/a
2001	Bilal	1st Born Second	—N/a
2002	Talib Kweli	Quality	Gold
2002	The Roots	Phrenology	Gold
2002	Common	Electric Circus	—N/a
2003	Erykah Badu	Worldwide Underground	Gold
2006*	Bilal	Love for Sale	—N/a
(*) leaked without commercial release

== See also ==
- Alternative R&B
- Jam session
