= Cleva =

2001 single by Erykah Badu

Single by Erykah Badu

from the album Mama's Gun
- Released: April 17, 2001
- Recorded: 2000
- Genre: Neo soul; jazz
- Length: 3:55
- Label: Motown
- Songwriter(s): Erykah Badu; James Poyser; James Yancey
- Producer(s): Erykah Badu; J Dilla; James Poyser

Erykah Badu singles chronology
"Didn't Cha Know?" (2001)	"Cleva" (2001)	"Sweet Baby" (2001)

"Cleva" is a song recorded by American singer Erykah Badu for her second studio album Mama's Gun (2000). It was written and produced by Badu, J Dilla, and James Poyser, a member of the Soulquarians and Badu's own production team Frequency. The song features Roy Ayers on vibraphone. It was released as the third and final single from Mama's Gun on April 17, 2001, by Motown Records.

Due to its limited, airplay-only release, "Cleva" failed to chart on the US Billboard Hot 100, but peaked at number 77 on the Hot R&B/Hip-Hop Songs.

== Track listing ==
US promotional 12-inch vinyl

1. "Cleva" (radio edit) – 3:55
2. "Cleva" (album version) – 4:33
3. "Cleva" (instrumental) – 4:32
4. "Cleva" (acappella) – 3:41

== Charts ==
Weekly chart performance for "Cleva"
Chart (2001)	Peak position
US Adult R&B Songs (Billboard)	20
US Hot R&B/Hip-Hop Songs (Billboard)	77

== Release history ==
Release dates and formats for "Cleva"
Region	Date	Format(s)	Label(s)	Ref.
United States	April 17, 2001	Urban adult contemporary radio; urban contemporary radio	Motown	
