= Bag Lady =

2000 single by Erykah Badu

Single by Erykah Badu

from the album Mama's Gun
- B-side: "On & On"
- Released: August 8, 2000
- Genre: Neo soul
- Length: 5:48 (album version); 4:04 (remix edit)
- Label: Motown
- Songwriters: Erykah Badu; Isaac Hayes
- Producers: Erykah Badu; Tone the Backbone

Erykah Badu singles chronology
"Southern Gul" (1999)	"Bag Lady" (2000)	"Didn't Cha Know?" (2000)

Music video
- "Bag Lady" on YouTube

"Bag Lady" is a song recorded by American singer Erykah Badu for her second studio album Mama's Gun (2000). Written by Badu and Isaac Hayes, the song is about a woman who is trying to begin a new relationship but has too much emotional baggage and can't get close to anyone. The song's message is to "pack light" and have hope for the future. It was released as the lead single from Mama's Gun on August 8, 2000, by Motown Records.

A commercial success, "Bag Lady" peaked at number six on the US Billboard Hot 100, becoming Badu's first top-ten hit on the chart, and topped the Hot R&B/Hip-Hop Singles & Tracks chart for six weeks. Critically acclaimed, it earned Badu two nominations at the 43rd Annual Grammy Awards (2001), for Best Female R&B Vocal Performance and Best R&B Song.

== Commercial performance ==
In the United States, "Bag Lady" debuted at number 67 on the Billboard Hot 100 on the issue dated August 19, 2000. After weeks of ascending and descending within the chart, it reached its peak at number six on October 7, 2000, thus becoming Badu's first top-ten hit on the chart. It spent a total of 20 weeks on the chart and finished at number 69 on the year-end Billboard Hot 100 for 2000. It also became Badu's second Hot R&B/Hip-Hop Singles & Tracks number-one hit, spending six consecutive weeks atop the chart and 33 weeks on the chart in total. Internationally, it charted only in the Netherlands, where it peaked at number 93 on the Dutch Single Top 100.

== Music video ==
The accompanying music video for "Bag Lady" was directed by Badu and designed by visual artist and designer Ron Norsworthy. It uses the Cheeba Sac remix of the song, which samples Dr. Dre's "Xxplosive" from his album 2001 (1999), which was based on the song "Bumpy's Lament" from the soundtrack for the film Shaft (1971). In a segment during the video, Erykah and her "bag ladies"–including singers Yahzarah and N'dambi, as well as Badu's mother and sister–dance to an excerpt of Johnny Hammond's "Gambler's Life" (1974). (Note: Badu also interpolated "Gambler's Life" on "Booty", another song from Mama's Gun.) The video was shot on Mini DV digital video—an unusual choice for a mainstream music video production–which gave it an appearance similar to a home movie.

== Track listings and formats ==
US 12-inch vinyl

1. "Bag Lady" (Cheeba Sac version) – 5:09
2. "Bag Lady" (Cheeba Sac radio edit) – 4:04
3. "Bag Lady" (radio edit) – 4:06
4. "Bag Lady" (Cheeba Sac instrumental) – 4:57
5. "Bag Lady" (instrumental) – 5:50
6. "Bag Lady" (a cappella) – 5:40

US cassette and CD single

1. "Bag Lady" (Cheeba Sac version) – 5:09
2. "Bag Lady" (album version) – 5:50

European maxi CD single

1. "Bag Lady" (Cheeba Sac radio edit) – 4:04
2. "Bag Lady" (radio edit) – 4:06
3. "Bag Lady" (Cheeba Sac instrumental) – 4:57
4. "On & On" (live) – 5:25

Japanese maxi CD single

1. "Bag Lady" (Cheeba Sac radio edit) – 4:04
2. "Bag Lady" (radio edit) – 4:06
3. "Bag Lady" (instrumental) – 5:50

== Charts ==
=== Weekly charts ===
Chart (2000)	Peak position
Canada (Nielsen SoundScan)	6
Netherlands (Single Top 100)	93
US Billboard Hot 100	6
US Adult R&B Songs (Billboard)	2
US Hot R&B/Hip-Hop Songs (Billboard)	1

=== Year-end charts ===
Chart (2000)	Position
US Billboard Hot 100	69
US Hot R&B/Hip-Hop Singles & Tracks (Billboard)	12

Chart (2001)	Position
Canada (Nielsen SoundScan)	143
US Hot R&B/Hip-Hop Singles & Tracks (Billboard)	77

== Release history ==
Release dates and formats for "Bag Lady"
Region	Date	Format(s)	Label(s)	Ref.
United States	August 8, 2000	Rhythmic contemporary radio; urban adult contemporary radio; urban contemporary radio	Motown	
United States	August 15, 2000	12-inch vinyl	Motown	
Japan	September 6, 2000	Maxi CD	Universal Music Japan	
United States	September 12, 2000	Cassette; CD	Motown	
France	September 25, 2000	Maxi CD	Barclay	

== See also ==
- List of Hot R&B/Hip-Hop Singles & Tracks number ones of 2000
