= Frustrated Artist Tour =

2003 concert tour by Erykah Badu

- Tour by Erykah Badu
- Associated album: Worldwide Underground
- Start date: January 12, 2003
- End date: February 22, 2003
- Legs: 3
- No. of shows: 30 in North America; 2 in Europe; 32 total

Erykah Badu concert chronology
- Mama's Gun World Tour (2001); Frustrated Artist Tour (2003); Worldwide Underground Tour (2004)

The Frustrated Artist Tour was a club and theater tour by American R&B singer Erykah Badu. During the summer of 2002, Badu at the time was getting writer's block from penning songs for her album Worldwide Underground. Hoping to find inspiration, she set out on a 2-month trek of theaters and small clubs, with additional dates added through the summer until December. During this tour, Erykah had the chance to showcase new songs from the album, "Danger", "I Want You", "Woo" and "Back in the Day (Puff)". A new song "Dear Misery" was performed well as hits.

Badu's show featured a DJ, laser lights, and audience participation as Erykah would perform songs requested from the audience. Badu would often stage dive into the audience, and singer Zap Mama would appear on select dates as a featured guest.

== Opening act ==
- Common (USA—Leg, select dates)
- Cody Chesnutt (USA—Leg)

== Set list ==
1. "Badu Show" (Intro)
2. "Bump It"
3. "No Love"^{1}
4. "Certainly"
5. "Back in the Day (Puff)"^{1}
6. "Otherside of the Game"
7. "Danger"
8. Medley: "On & On"/"...& On"
9. "Woo"
10. "Appletree"
11. "Penitentiary Philosophy"
12. "I Want You"
13. "Baby I'm Scared of You"^{1}
14. "Cleva"
15. "Dear Misery" (New song)
16. "Do You Wanna' Go to Hell?" (with Cody Chesnutt) (New song)
17. "Kiss Me on My Neck" (contains excerpts of "My Neck, My Back (Lick It)"
18. "Didn't Cha Know?"
19. "Time's a Wastin'"^{1}
20. "Ye Yo" ^{1}
21. "Next Lifetime"
22. "Orange Moon"^{1}
23. "Green Eyes"
24. "Love of My Life (An Ode to Hip-Hop)" (contains excerpts of "La Di Da Di" and "Rapper's Delight")
25. "Bag Lady"

^{1}performed only on selected dates in North America
^{2}performed on dates in Europe

== Notes ==
- Badu's boyfriend at that time was hip hop artist Common. On select dates for the performance of their number one R&B hit, "Love of My Life (Hip-Hop)", Common joined Erykah on stage, both performers delivering a rousing ovation of the song.
- Opening act Cody Chesnutt joined in for her performance of "Do You Want To Go To Hell" on selected dates during the tour.
- For her concert on June 30, in Chicago at the Petrillo Band Shell, R&B singer Syleena Johnson was featured as opening act before the show.

== Tour dates ==
Date	City	Country	Venue
North America
January 12, 2003	Seattle	United States	The Showbox
January 14, 2003	San Francisco	United States	The Fillmore
January 15, 2003	San Diego	United States	Belly Up
January 16, 2003	West Hollywood	United States	House of Blues
January 18, 2003	Las Vegas	United States	House of Blues
January 19, 2003	Phoenix	United States	Club Rio
January 20, 2003	Albuquerque	United States	Sunshine Theater
January 21, 2003	Denver	United States	Paramount Theatre
January 23, 2003	St. Louis	United States	The Pageant
January 24, 2003	Minneapolis	United States	First Avenue
January 25, 2003	Chicago	United States	House of Blues
January 27, 2003	Royal Oak	United States	Royal Oak Music Theatre
January 29, 2003	New York City	United States	S.O.B.'s
January 30, 2003	New York City	United States	S.O.B.'s
January 31, 2003	Washington, D.C.	United States	Dream
February 1, 2003	Atlantic City	United States	Xanadu Theater
February 3, 2003	Philadelphia	United States	Theatre of Living Arts
February 4, 2003	Pittsburgh	United States	Club Laga
February 5, 2003	Indianapolis	United States	The Vogue
February 8, 2003	Lake Buena Vista	United States	House of Blues
February 9, 2003	Miami	United States	The Level
February 13, 2003	Myrtle Beach	United States	House of Blues
February 14, 2003	Atlanta	United States	The Tabernacle
February 15, 2003	Robinsonville	United States	River Palace Arena
February 18, 2003	New Orleans	United States	House of Blues
February 20, 2003	Grambling	United States	Sandle Theater
February 21, 2003	Austin	United States	Austin Music Hall (Originally scheduled for Stubb’s Bar-B-Q/Waller Creek Ampitheater)
February 22, 2003	Dallas	United States	House of Blues
June 15, 2003	San Diego	United States	4th and B
June 30, 2003	Chicago	United States	Petrillo Music Shell
Europe
December 9, 2003	Milan	Italy	Teatro alla Scala
December 10, 2003	Warsaw	Poland	Sala Kongresowa

Notes

- The tour resumed that summer through December, not all tour dates listed.
