= Supermoon (Zap Mama album) =

Studio album by Zap Mama
- Released: August 7, 2007
- Studios: Luc Weytjen's Studio (Antwerp, BE); Irving's Place Studios (New York, NY); Dada Studios (Brussels, BE); Marie's Home (Brussels, BE)
- Length: 42:16
- Labels: Heads Up; Concord
- Producers: Chris McHale; Marie Daulne

Zap Mama chronology
Ancestry in Progress (2004)	Supermoon (2007)	ReCreation (2009)

Professional ratings
Review scores
Source	Rating
AllMusic	3/5 stars
Entertainment Weekly	B+
Now	3/5 Ns
Pitchfork	7.7/10
PopMatters	6/10
Tom Hull	B

Supermoon is the sixth studio album by Belgian afro-pop group Zap Mama. It was released on August 7, 2007 via Heads Up International and Concord Records. Recordind sessions took place at Luc Weytjen's Studio in Antwerp, at Irving's Place Studios in New York City, at Dada Studios and at Marie's Home in Brussels. Production was handled by Marie Daulne and Christopher McHale with co-producers Luc Weytjens, Anthony Tidd and Jack Splash. The album peaked at number 74 on the Ultratop charts in Flanders.

== Track listing ==
No.	Title	Writer(s)	Producer(s)	Length
1.	"1000 Ways"	Marie Daulne; Ida Kristine Nielsen	Marie Daulne	3:22
2.	"Hey Brotha"	M. Daulne; Michael Franti	Marie Daulne; Luc Weytjens (co.)	3:18
3.	"Supermoon"	M. Daulne; Christopher McHale; Michael Leonhart	Marie Daulne; Chris McHale	3:50
4.	"Go Boy"	M. Daulne; Yussef Ahmed	Marie Daulne; Chris McHale (co.)	3:37
5.	"Affection"	M. Daulne	Marie Daulne; Anthony Tidd (co.)	3:37
6.	"Toma Taboo"	M. Daulne; Fredy Massamba	Marie Daulne; Luc Weytjens (co.)	4:51
7.	"Kwenda"	M. Daulne	Marie Daulne; Jack Splash (co.)	3:54
8.	"Gati"	M. Daulne; Yassine Daulne; Gatti Bongo; Pelembir Dieudonné	Marie Daulne	3:53
9.	"Where Are You?"	M. Daulne; McHale; Leonhart	Marie Daulne; Chris McHale (co.)	4:29
10.	"Moonray"	M. Daulne; Gilbert Cohen; Nicolas Chaix; Jurgen Rogiers	Marie Daulne	3:15
11.	"Princess Kesia"	M. Daulne	Marie Daulne	4:10
Total length:				42:16

Bonus track
No.	Title	Writer(s)	Producer(s)	Length
12.	"Bee Song"	Marie Daulne; Anthony-Michael Alexander	Marie Daulne

Notes

- "Moonray" features an excerpt from "Superfight" as performed by Chateau Fight.

== Charts ==
Chart (2007)	Peak position
Belgian Albums (Ultratop Flanders)	74
