= Things Fall Apart (album) =

Studio album by the Roots
- Released: February 23, 1999
- Recorded: 1997–1998
- Studios: Electric Lady; Cutting Room (New York City)
- Genres: East Coast hip-hop; alternative hip-hop; jazz rap; progressive rap; art pop
- Length: 68:54
- Label: MCA
- Producers: Chaos; James Poyser; Jay Dee; Kamal Gray; Questlove; Rahzel; Scott Storch; The Grand Wizzards

The Roots chronology
Illadelph Halflife (1996)	Things Fall Apart (1999)	The Legendary (1999)

Singles from Things Fall Apart
- 1. "You Got Me" Released: January 22, 1999; 2. "The Next Movement" Released: May 30, 1999

Things Fall Apart is the fourth studio album by American hip-hop band the Roots, released on February 23, 1999, by MCA Records. Recording sessions for the album took place at Electric Lady during 1997 to 1998, coinciding with recording for other projects of the Soulquarians collective, including D'Angelo's Voodoo (2000), Erykah Badu's Baduizm (1997), and Common's One Day It'll All Make Sense (1997). According to Spin magazine, the album became a landmark moment for the Roots and the collective, as it "swelled the Roots clique into a movement-style posse".

The album has been considered by music writers as the Roots' breakthrough album, earning praise from major publications and critics, while becoming the group's first record to sell over 500,000 copies. It includes the song "You Got Me", which won the 2000 Grammy Award for Best Rap Performance by a Duo or Group, while Things Fall Apart was also nominated for the Grammy Award for Best Rap Album of the same year, losing to Eminem's The Slim Shady LP. Rolling Stone called it a "top-flight record", while AllMusic cited it as "one of the cornerstone albums of alternative rap." The album takes its title from Chinua Achebe's novel of the same name, which in turn took the phrase from William Butler Yeats's poem "The Second Coming". On April 5, 1999, Things Fall Apart was certified Gold by the Recording Industry Association of America (RIAA) for shipments of 500,000 units and on April 22, 2013, 14 years after its release, the album was certified Platinum by RIAA for shipments of 1,000,000 units.

== Recording ==
Recording for Things Fall Apart began in 1997 with engineer David Ivory and was completed in early 1998. Sessions for the album coincided with those for other Soulquarians projects at Electric Lady, including D'Angelo's Brown Sugar (1995), Erykah Badu's Baduizm (1997), and Common's One Day It'll All Make Sense (1997). Questlove has stated that during this period, the group recorded upwards of around 145 songs, later whittling down their choices to 14 songs (intros and interludes withstanding). The last song to be included to the final selection was "Double Trouble", featuring Mos Def. Initially, the song was supposed to feature a guest appearance from Mos Def's Black Star partner, Talib Kweli but due to the format of the track, it was decided to make it a throwback to the Run D.M.C./EPMD tag-team style of rap, with just two MCs.

== Music ==
The album's opening track, "Act Won", contains an excerpt from the Spike Lee film, Mo' Better Blues. The excerpt comes from a scene where Denzel Washington and Wesley Snipes are discussing the current state of African American music (or culture in general) after a gig. The track "Act Too (The Love of My Life)", originally an interlude that evolved into a full song, features Common, whose verse is a continuation of his song "I Used to Love H.E.R.", off his 1994 album Resurrection, in which Common speaks of hip-hop as a woman. However, Questlove has stated that this is not "I used to love H.E.R. (the daughter), rather it is a "reflection on the evolution of hip hop, through our eyes." Beanie Sigel made his recording debut on the track "Adrenaline!", after tagging along to a weekly jam session held by the group in Philadelphia. Eve (at the time, signed to Dr. Dre's Aftermath label, and known as Eve of Destruction) also made her debut on Things Fall Apart, on the track, "You Got Me".

"You Got Me" was co-written by Jill Scott who recorded vocals for the song's chorus and bridge. Scott's part was subsequently re-recorded by Erykah Badu at the insistence of MCA, who wanted a higher profile collaboration for the album's official lead single – as Scott was relatively unknown outside of Philadelphia at the time. When the group later went on tour, Scott joined them during performances of the song. "You Got Me" caught on quickly on the radio and later MTV, giving the group a much needed boost in terms of sales and exposure. Its Grammy win provided a second round of success. The outside musicians who contributed to the album (mainly D'Angelo, James Poyser, and Jay Dee) were part of the Soulquarians collective with Questlove and Pino Palladino.

== Cover artwork ==
For a limited time period, Things Fall Apart was made available with a choice of five different front covers. One such cover displays a photograph taken during a riot in the civil rights movement era. In the stark black-and-white photo, riot police are seen chasing two black teenagers on the streets of Bedford-Stuyvesant.

In 2005, this cover was included in the book The Greatest Album Covers Of All Time by Barry Miles, Grant Scott & Johnny Morgan, and published by Collins & Brown. Billboard ranked the cover number 46 in their list of the best album covers of all time, and number 43 in their list of the best hip-hop album covers of all time. Rolling Stone ranked the cover number 45 in their list of the best album covers of all time. The cover was also ranked one of the most iconic album covers by publications such as Highsnobiety and Yardbarker.

== Reception ==
Professional ratings
Review scores
Source	Rating
AllMusic	5/5 stars
Alternative Press	4/5
Entertainment Weekly	B
Muzik	5/5 stars
NME	8/10
Pitchfork	9.4/10
Q	4/5 stars
Rolling Stone	4/5 stars
Spin	9/10
The Village Voice	B+

Upon its release, Things Fall Apart was widely regarded as the group's most fully realized work. Critics praised the album for its sobering themes, sonic quality, and fluid, cohesive sequencing, with Touré of Rolling Stone calling it a "top-flight record" and lead MC Black Thought a "lyricist's lyricist with a hard, earnest voice that doesn't flow like water but bobs and weaves with less-predictable rhythms". Mojo commented that the album is "the stunner they've always promised: the first candidate for hip hop album of 1999 ... in a hip-hop world dominated by well-worn pop samples and rap rewrites of 80's chart hits, such risk-taking should be cherished". Marie Elsie St. Léger of Barnes & Noble wrote in her review that the album had "Unfussy yet precise production, irresistible beats, and smooth rhymes. Few albums manage to simultaneously be this informative, political, and downright groovy." Spin's Neil Kulkarni suggested that "the Roots have created perhaps rap's first melancholy masterpiece", noting "a downered, fragmented feel to the music that weaves through the lyrics' bleak resignation to instill real poignancy and effect."

Steve Jones of USA Today complimented the band's "jazzy, live instrumentation and dense, insightful lyrics" and commented that it "elevates hip-hop with literate, thoughtful grooves". In his consumer guide for The Village Voice, Robert Christgau criticized Kamal Gray's "omnipresent ostinato beds", but commended the band for "looking back to the old-school rap they loved before they discovered jazz lite", and stated "What's so consistently annoying on their earlier intelligent records is almost hooky on this one, integral to a flow that certainly does just that, which isn't to say you won't be relieved when it rocks the house instead". Fans responded with as much enthusiasm, and the album shipped Platinum in the United States.

=== Retrospect ===
AllMusic critic Steve Huey hailed Things Fall Apart as "one of the cornerstone albums of alternative rap", believing that it was "the point where the Roots' tremendous potential finally coalesced into a structured album that maintained its focus from top to bottom". Writing for The Root in 2018, Panama Jackson described "Act Too (The Love of My Life)" as "one of the best beats in hip-hop history...it's so ethereal and beautiful and fit perfectly with the verses".

In 2007, the album was featured in The Guardian's "1000 Albums to Hear Before You Die" list. In 2020, the album was ranked number 416 on Rolling Stone's list of the 500 Greatest Albums of All Time. In 2022, Rolling Stone ranked the album number 51 in their list of the 200 greatest hip-hop albums of all time. In 2024, the album was ranked number 81 in Billboard's list of the greatest rap albums of all time. In a 2025 poll by Pitchfork readers, the album was ranked number 44 on their list of the best rap albums of all time.

== Track listing ==
All tracks produced by The Grand Wizzards, except where noted.

No.	Title	Writer(s)	Producer(s)	Length
54.	"Act Won (Things Fall Apart)"	Ahmir Thompson; Shelton Lee		0:54
55.	"Table of Contents (Parts 1 & 2)"	Thompson; Tariq Trotter; Kamal Gray; Rahzel Brown; Kyle Jones; Leonard Hubbard; Malik Abdul-Bassit; Karl Jenkins	Questlove	3:37
56.	"The Next Movement" (featuring DJ Jazzy Jeff and Jazzyfatnastees)	Thompson; Trotter; Gray; Hubbard	Kamal Gray	4:10
57.	"Step into the Realm"	Thompson; Trotter; Gray; Hubbard; Abdul-Bassit; Kenyatta Williams		2:49
58.	"The Spark"	Thompson; Gray; Hubbard; Abdul-Bassit		3:53
59.	"Dynamite!" (featuring Rehani Sayeed)	Trotter; Rehani Sayeed; James Yancey	Jay Dee	4:46
60.	"Without a Doubt" (featuring Lady B)	Trotter; JB Weaver; Melvin Lewis	Chaos	4:15
61.	"Ain't Sayin' Nothin' New" (featuring Dice Raw)	Thompson; Trotter; Gray; Brown; Jones; Hubbard; Scott Storch; Jenkins	Scott Storch (co.)	4:34
62.	"Double Trouble" (featuring Mos Def)	Thompson; Trotter; Gray; Brown; Jones; Hubbard; Dante Smith; Jenkins; James Poyser	James Poyser (co.)	5:51
63.	"Act Too (The Love of My Life)" (featuring Common)	Thompson; Trotter; Gray; Brown; Jones; Hubbard; Lonnie Lynn; Jenkins; Poyser		4:55
64.	"100% Dundee"	Thompson; Trotter; Gray; Brown; Jones; Hubbard; Abdul-Bassit; Jenkins	Kamal Gray; Rahzel	3:54
65.	"Diedre vs. Dice" (featuring Dice Raw)	Thompson; Jenkins; Diedre Murray		0:47
66.	"Adrenaline!" (featuring Dice Raw and Beanie Sigel)	Thompson; Trotter; Gray; Brown; Jones; Hubbard; Abdul-Bassit; Storch; Jenkins; Dwight Grant	Scott Storch (co.)	4:28
67.	"3rd Acts: ? vs. Scratch 2... Electric Boogaloo"	Thompson; Gray; Hubbard; Abdul-Bassit		0:51
68.	"You Got Me" (featuring Erykah Badu and Eve)	Thompson; Trotter; Gray; Brown; Jones; Hubbard; Storch; Erica Wright; Eve Cooper; Jenkins; Jill Scott	Scott Storch (co.)	4:19
69.	"Don't See Us" (featuring Dice Raw)	Thompson; Trotter; Gray; Brown; Jones; Hubbard; Abdul-Bassit; Jenkins; Poyser		4:30
70.	"The Return to Innocence Lost" (featuring Ursula Rucker)	Thompson; Rucker; Anthony Tidd		5:40
71.	"Act Fore... The End?"	Thompson; Trotter	Questlove	4:45

- The track listing on some album releases denotes the first track as track 54, combining the track totals from Organix (17 tracks), Do You Want More?!!!??! (16 tracks), and Illadelph Halflife (20 tracks), making 53 total tracks. The rest of the tracks continue upward from 54 to "Act Fore... The End?" (being track 71)
- An edited version of the album exists in which "The Return of Innocence Lost" is substituted for a different spoken word outro, titled "Things Fall Apart...The Center Will Not Hold". Additionally, it uses a completely different hidden track, however it retains the title of "Act Fore...The End?".

== Personnel ==
- The Roots – Primary Artist
- Rehani Sayed - Vocals
- D'Angelo – Keyboards
- Marie Daulne – Background Vocals
- Larry Gold – Viola
- Bob Power – Mixing, Synthesizer
- James Poyser – Keyboards
- Scott Storch – Keyboards
- Dice Raw – Vocals
- Questlove – Drums
- Erykah Badu – Background Vocals
- Igor Szwec – Violin
- Leonard Hubbard – Bass
- Anthony Tidd – Guitar
- Common – Vocals
- Mos Def – Vocals
- Ursula Rucker – Poetry
- Eve – Vocals
- Beanie Sigel – Vocals

== Charts ==
=== Weekly charts ===
Chart performance for Things Fall Apart
Chart (1999)	Peak position
Canadian Albums (Billboard)	7
Dutch Albums (Album Top 100)	4
French Albums (SNEP)	9
German Albums (Offizielle Top 100)	11
Swiss Albums (Schweizer Hitparade)	2
UK Albums (Official Charts)	84
UK R&B Albums (Official Charts)	9
US Billboard 200	4
US Top R&B/Hip-Hop Albums (Billboard)	2

=== Year-end charts ===
Chart (1999)	Position
US Billboard 200	143
US Top R&B/Hip-Hop Albums (Billboard)	50

== Certifications ==
Region	Certification	Certified units/sales
Canada (Music Canada)	Gold	50,000^{^}
United Kingdom (BPI)	Silver	60,000^{*}
United States (RIAA)	Platinum	1,000,000^{^}
^{*} Sales figures based on certification alone.^{^} Shipments figures based on certification alone.
