= Brown Sugar (soundtrack) =

Soundtrack album by Various artists
- Released: September 24, 2002
- Recorded: 2001–2002
- Genres: Hip hop; R&B
- Length: 1:03:49
- Label: MCA Records
- Producers: David Gates (exec.); Gary Ashley (exec.); Jeff Harleston (exec.); Kathy Nelson (exec.); Tom Sarig (exec.); Kanye West; Hi-Tek; Angie Stone; Chief Xcel; Davel "Bo" McKenzie; Dre & Vidal; Eric B. & Rakim; Erykah Badu; Henri Charlemagne; Kenny Whitehead; Missy Elliott; Rahsaan Patterson; Raphael Saadiq; The Grand Wizzards

Singles from Brown Sugar
- 1. "Love of My Life (An Ode to Hip-Hop)" Released: August 20, 2002

Professional ratings
Review scores
Source	Rating
AllMusic	4/5 stars
RapReviews	7.5/10

Music from the Motion Picture Soundtrack Brown Sugar is the soundtrack to Rick Famuyiwa's 2002 film Brown Sugar. It was released on September 24, 2002 through MCA Records, and consists of hip hop and R&B music. The album peaked at number 16 on the Billboard 200, at number 2 on the Top R&B/Hip-Hop Albums, at number 1 on the Top Soundtracks, and was placed at number 40 on Pitchfork's the 50 Best Movie Soundtracks of All Time.

The album spawned Erykah Badu and Common's successful single "Love of My Life (An Ode to Hip-Hop)", which made it to number 9 on the Billboard Hot 100, number 1 on the Hot R&B/Hip-Hop Singles & Tracks, and won a Grammy Award for Best R&B Song.

== Track listing ==
No.	Title	Writer(s)	Producer(s)	Length
1.	"Brown Sugar (Extra Sweet)" (performed by Mos Def featuring Faith Evans)	Dante Smith; Kanye West; Darryl Toler-Shabazz; Douglas Wimbish; Dominic Durham; Lamar Mitchell; Faith Evans	Kanye West; Scott Storch (add.)	3:30
2.	"Love of My Life (An Ode to Hip-Hop)" (performed by Erykah Badu featuring Common)	Raphael Saadiq; Erykah Badu; Robert Ozuna; James Poyser; Glenn Standridge; Madukwu Chinwah; Rashid Lonnie Lynn	Erykah Badu; Raphael Saadiq; Jake and the Phatman (co.); James Poyser (co.)	5:39
3.	"Bring Your Heart" (performed by Angie Stone featuring Diamond Stone)	Angie Stone; Homer Talbert; Herscholt Polk	Angie Stone	4:50
4.	"Brown Sugar (Raw)" (performed by Black Star)	Smith; Talib Kweli Greene; West	Kanye West	3:44
5.	"Easy Conversation" (performed by Jill Scott)	Jill Scott; Vidal Davis; Andre Harris	Vidal Davis; Andre Harris	4:58
6.	"It's Going Down" (performed by Blackalicious featuring Lateef the Truth Speaker and Keke Wyatt)	Chief Xcel; Gift of Gab; Lateef; Jonell	Chief Xcel; Hi-Tek (co.)	3:58
7.	"Breakdown" (performed by Mos Def)	Smith; West	Kanye West	3:02
8.	"You Make Life So Good" (performed by Rahsaan Patterson)	Rahsaan Patterson; Davel "Bo" McKenzie	Davel "Bo" McKenzie; Rahsaan Patterson	3:59
9.	"Time After Time" (performed by Cassandra Wilson)	Cyndi Lauper; Rob Hyman		4:07
10.	"Paid in Full (7 Minutes of Madness - The Coldcut Remix)" (performed by Eric B. & Rakim)	Eric Barrier; William Griffin	Eric B.; Rakim	7:11
11.	"No One Knows Her Name" (performed by Hi-Tek featuring Big D and Piakhan)	Tony Cottrell; Delvin Geralds; David Stanford Jr.	Hi-Tek	3:56
12.	"Act Too (Love of My Life) (Remix)" (performed by The Roots)	Tariq Trotter; Ahmir Thompson; Lynn; Poyser; The Roots	The Grand Wizzards	3:37
13.	"Never Been" (performed by Mary J. Blige)	Missy Elliott; Henri Charlemagne; Gene McFadden; John Whitehead; Jerry Cohen	Missy Elliott; Henri Charlemagne	4:04
14.	"Brown Sugar (Fine)" (performed by Mos Def featuring Adaritha)	Smith; West; Bronisław Kaper; Paul Francis Webster	Kanye West	3:32
15.	"You Changed" (performed by Jully Black)	Kenny Whitehead; Jully Black	Kenny Whitehead	3:52
Total length:				1:03:49

Sample credits

- "Bring Your Heart" contains elements of "Ain't Understanding Mellow", performed by Jerry Butler, featuring Brenda Lee Eager.
- "Never Been" contains elements of "Why Oh Why"; written by Gene McFadden, John Whitehead, and Jerry Cohen; performed by McFadden & Whitehead.
- "Brown Sugar (Fine)" contains elements from "Invitation", performed by Norman Connors.

== Chart history ==
=== Weekly charts ===
Chart (2002)	Peak position
US Billboard 200	16
US Top R&B/Hip-Hop Albums (Billboard)	2
US Top Soundtracks (Billboard)	1

=== Year-end charts ===
Chart (2002)	Position
US Top R&B/Hip-Hop Albums (Billboard)	81
