= A Ma Zone =

Studio album by Zap Mama
- Released: 1999
- Label: Luaka Bop
- Producer: Marie Daulne

Zap Mama chronology
| 7 (1997) | A Ma Zone (1999) | Push It to the Max EP (2002) |

A Ma Zone is an album by the group Zap Mama, released in 1999. The group supported the album with a North American tour. The first single was "Rafiki".

== Production ==
Produced by frontwoman Marie Daulne, the album was recorded in part in the United States; Daulne was influenced by techno. The group, which included Daulne's sister, Anita, sang in Swahili and French, among other languages.

Manu Dibango played saxophone on "'Allo 'Allo". Black Thought rapped on "Rafiki". Speech also appeared on the album.

== Critical reception ==
Professional ratings
Review scores
| Source | Rating |
|---|---|
| AllMusic | 4/5 stars |
| Calgary Herald | 4/5 stars |
| Robert Christgau | (dud) |
| The Encyclopedia of Popular Music | 4/5 stars |
| Entertainment Weekly | B+ |
| Spin | 7/10 |

The Washington Post noted that "actual drums and bass ... now underpin the group's sound, but this album shifts the emphasis back toward interwoven female voices." Entertainment Weekly praised the "strong central voice—main Mama Marie Daulne—anchoring a rare album that’s both global and personal." The Chicago Tribune thought that A Ma Zone "taps into electronica, funk and folk with an inspired, gimmick-free dexterity."

Spin determined that, "at points, the gorgeously arranged vocal interplay suggests pan-rap paradise." The Calgary Herald concluded that "Zap Mama has lost a little of its originality, a little of its uniqueness—or perhaps its funky sound is simply more familiar in the global musical melting pot." Newsday stated that the "sound is an ethereal tumble of synthesizers and other instruments, anchored by muscular, percussive beats."

AllMusic wrote that "breakbeats, jazzy upright bass, and turntable manipulation are now a part of the mix—a mix that was already rich with European and West African influences."

== Track listing ==
| No. | Title | Length |
|---|---|---|
| 1. | "Rafiki" |
| 2. | "W'Happy Mama" |
| 3. | "Call Waiting" |
| 4. | "Gissié" |
| 5. | "Songe" |
| 6. | "Kemake" |
| 7. | "Comment Ça Va?" |
| 8. | "Ya Solo" |
| 9. | "My Own Zero" |
| 10. | "M'Toto" |
| 11. | "Gbo Mata (Station)" |
| 12. | "'Allo 'Allo" |
