= Worldwide Underground =

Studio album by Erykah Badu
- Released: September 16, 2003
- Recorded: 2001–2003
- Studios: Circle House Studios (Miami, FL); Compass Point Studios (Nassau, Bahamas); Electric Lady Studios (New York, NY); Palmyra Studios (Dallas, TX); The Kitchen (Dallas, TX); The Studio (Philadelphia, PA)
- Genres: R&B; hip hop; neo soul; funk
- Length: 54:21
- Label: Motown
- Producers: Erykah Badu; James Poyser; Rashad "Ringo" Smith; R.C. Williams; Dead Prez; Raphael Saadiq

Erykah Badu chronology
Mama's Gun (2000)	Worldwide Underground (2003)	New Amerykah Part One (4th World War) (2008)

Singles from Worldwide Underground
- 1. "Danger" Released: August 4, 2003; 2. "Back in the Day (Puff)" Released: October 2003

Worldwide Underground is the third studio album by American singer Erykah Badu, released September 16, 2003, by Motown Records. Recording sessions for the album took place during 2003, following Badu's period of writer's block, and her performances during the Frustrated Artist Tour. Production was handled primarily by the production group Freakquency, consisting of Badu, Rashad Smith, James Poyser, and RC Williams. Prominently influenced by old-school 1970s and 80s hip hop, soul, R&B and funk elements, the album features an unconventional musical structure; the songwriting took a path of somewhat less subliminal, metaphorical lyrics than Badu’s previous work, expressing more lighthearted (but sincere) feelings, instead. The album’s content mainly focused on the general state of hip hop culture, reminiscing on good times, friends, partying, young love, “hood life”, and some references to gang culture. The album features appearances from artists Dead Prez, Common, Queen Latifah, Bahamadia, and singer Angie Stone.

The album debuted at number three on the U.S. Billboard 200 chart, selling 143,561 copies in its first week. It was certified gold by the Recording Industry Association of America, and produced three singles that achieved moderate chart success, while the album was underpromoted and sold less than her previous albums. Upon its release, Worldwide Underground received generally lukewarm reviews from critics. The album has sold 609,000 copies in the United States.

== Background ==
After taking some time off to raise her child, Badu returned in 2000 with Mama's Gun. The album was characterized as more organic in sound than her previous studio album, and primarily produced by the Soulquarians and noted bassist Pino Palladino. A remix of one of the album's songs, "Bag Lady", was issued as the first single and topped the R&B charts for seven weeks. The album was well-received, with the lyrical content winning notices from many publications. Reviewers found some of her lyrics hard to decipher on her initial releases. Despite not charting as high as her first two albums, Mama's Gun was another platinum-selling success, and "Bag Lady" was nominated for a Grammy Award. In 2001 Badu embarked on the Mama's Gun World Tour. The tour started in North America on February 10 in Cleveland, Ohio at the Allen Theatre. Badu will perform two nights in Washington, D.C. and Chicago. After the release of Mama's Gun and "Love of My Life", Badu suffered writer's block.

== Release and reception ==
Professional ratings
Review scores
Source	Rating
AllMusic	3.5/5 stars
Blender	3/5 stars
Entertainment Weekly	B+
Los Angeles Times	3/4 stars
Mojo	4/5 stars
Pitchfork	6.7/10
Q	2/5 stars
Rolling Stone	2/5 stars
Slant Magazine	2.5/5 stars
Uncut	3/5 stars

Worldwide Underground was released on September 16, 2003, by Motown Records. It debuted at number three on the U.S. Billboard 200 chart in the week of October 4, selling 143,561 copies in its first week. Ultimately spending 11 weeks on the Billboard 200, it also entered at number two on Billboard's Top R&B/Hip-Hop Albums and spent 30 weeks on the chart. By December 2003, the album had sold 394,000 copies domestically. Its first single, "Love of My Life (An Ode to Hip Hop)", peaked at number nine on the Billboard Hot 100 and at number one on the Hot R&B/Hip-Hop Songs chart. The second single "Danger" reached number 82 on the Hot 100 and number 27 on the Hot R&B/Hip-Hop Songs, while the third single "Back in the Day (Puff)" peaked at number 62 on the Hot R&B/Hip-Hop Songs chart. On October 28, 2003, Worldwide Underground was certified gold in sales by the Recording Industry Association of America, following sales in excess of 500,000 copies in the United States. According to Nielsen SoundScan, the album has sold 609,000 copies in the United States.

Worldwide Underground received generally lukewarm reviews from critics. At Metacritic, which assigns a normalized rating out of 100 to reviews from mainstream publications, the album received an average score of 71, based on 14 reviews. Andy Kellman from AllMusic said the record sounded "more like a weekend jam session than an endlessly labored-over, polished project. For the most part, this is a good thing". PopMatters critic Mark Anthony Neal commended Badu for her themes relating to hip hop culture and for her musical direction, writing that "it finds the artist 'Stepping into Tomorrow', with a new production collective in tow and some straight-up, free-floating, funky-ass R&B. And for the first time in her career, Badu is wearing her own voice and it is unmistakably Badu". Georgia Christgau from The Village Voice wrote that "although sometimes her reliance on mood threatens to get the better of Worldwide Underground, Badu remains faithful to the old school of flow, a blend of drums and rhythm designed to service soul's best instruments: its vocalists." Slant Magazine ranked the record number 90 on its list of the Best Albums of the Aughts.

In a less enthusiastic review, Uncut deemed Worldwide Underground oft-interesting but too groove-oriented music, while Blender observed "rambling, digital fiddling and self-indulgent sprawl here, but a sense of purpose, too, even as her lips move on autopilot." Jon Caramanica from Rolling Stone was more critical and said apart from "Danger" and "Love of My Life Worldwide", most of the songs sounded aimless, "variations on some atmospheric theme ... slither[ing] along unthreateningly".

== Tour ==
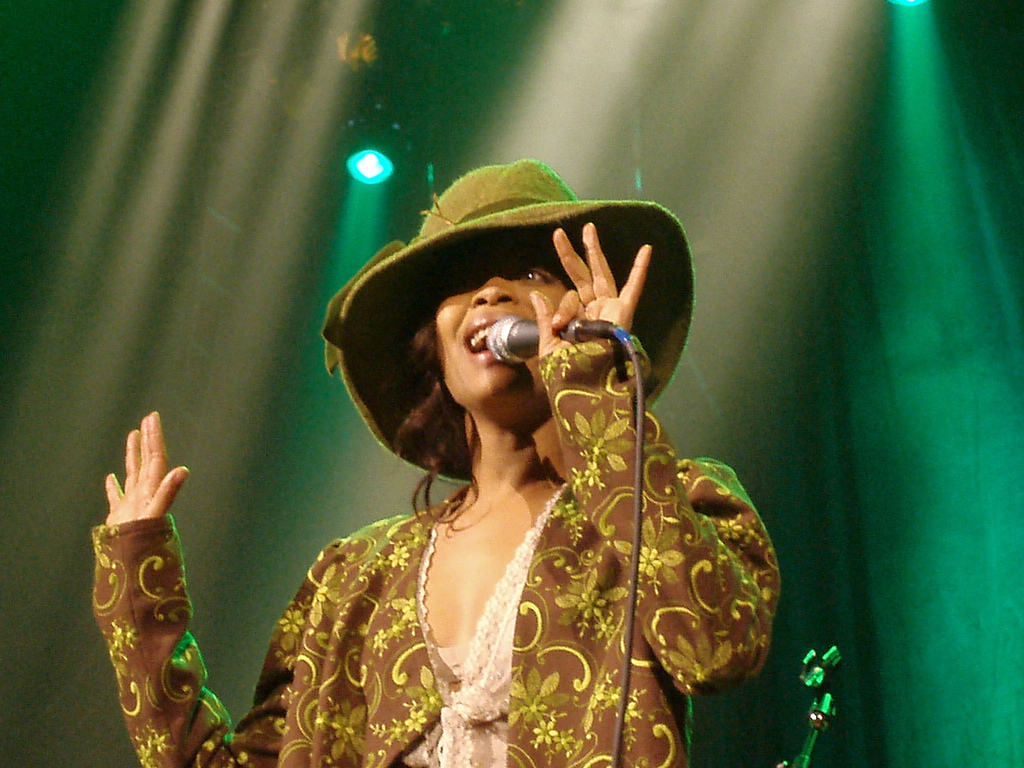
Badu in 2005.

Badu embarked on the Worldwide Underground Tour in 2004. The US trek kicked off on February 3 in New Orleans. and ran through the winter and spring with supporting act Floetry joining the tour February 5 in Houston. The Roots made a special opening act appearance at the February 11, show in Los Angeles. Badu resumed the tour during the fall with additional dates in America and Europe.

Badu co-founded the Sugar Water Festival with Queen Latifah and Jill Scott. The trek played to amphitheaters and arenas in the United States during the summer of 2005 and 2006. It began in 2005 as an event to bring awareness to health issues to African-American women. British duo Floetry opened shows during the 2005 run. The festival was relaunched briefly in 2006 with Kelis opening the show and comedian Mo'Nique hosting the festival. 2006 was the final year for the outing.

The festival was to expand into Europe and Asia, however, this did not come to fruition. The Summer Tour was a concert tour in 2006 by Badu. The tour started on June 10, in Knoxville, TN, with three shows in the U.S. and resumed in July for several shows in Europe. In August, Badu co-headlined dates with Jill Scott and Queen Latifah at the "Sugar Water Festival".

== Track listing ==
No.	Title	Writer(s)	Producer(s)	Length
1.	"World Keeps Turnin' (Intro)"	Erykah Badu	Erykah Badu	1:39
2.	"Bump It"	James Poyser, Rashad Smith, Badu, Audrie Magget	Badu, James Poyser, Rashad Smith	8:49
3.	"Back in the Day (Puff)"	Poyser, Smith, Magget, Badu	Badu, Poyser, Smith	4:46
4.	"I Want You"	Poyser, Badu, Smith, Magget	Badu, Smith, Poyser	10:53
5.	"Woo"	Williams, Badu	Badu, R.C. Williams, Smith	3:14
6.	"The Grind" (featuring Dead Prez)	Dead Prez, Stic.man, M-1	Dead Prez, Badu, Smith	2:49
7.	"Danger"	Badu, Williams, Smith, Poyser	Badu, Poyser, Williams, Smith	5:49
8.	"Think Twice"	Donald Byrd	Badu, Poyser, Smith	3:02
9.	"Love of My Life Worldwide" (featuring Queen Latifah, Bahamadia and Angie Stone)	Badu, Poyser, Smith, Queen Latifah, Angie Stone, Bahamadia	Badu, Williams, Smith, Poyser	5:25
10.	"World Keeps Turnin' (Outro)"	Badu	Badu	4:01

United Kingdom and Japan edition bonus tracks
No.	Title	Writer(s)	Producer(s)	Length
11.	"Love of My Life (An Ode to Hip-Hop)" (featuring Common)	Raphael Saadiq, Badu, Poyser, Robert Ozuna, Glen Standridge	Raphael Saadiq, Badu, add. producers: Poyser, Jake and the Phatman	3:50
12.	"Hollywood"	David Wolinski, Andre Fischer	Badu	5:32

== Personnel ==
=== Musicians ===
Freakquency

- Erykah Badu – vocals, arrangements, funk box (track 2, 5), drum programming (6)
- James Poyser – keyboards (2–4, 6–9, 11), additional programming (2), drums (11)
- Rashad "Ringo" Smith – drum programming (except 1, 4, 10), "funk cuts" (5), "cuts, spices and herbs" (11)
- R.C. Williams – keyboards (5, 7), additional programming (3)

with

- Braylon "Brother B." Lacy – bass (2–5, 7–9), handclaps (5)
- Doc Gibbs – percussion (2–4)
- Zap Mama, Caron Wheeler – vocals (2)
- Chinah Blac – background vocals (2, 7)
- Lenny Kravitz – electric guitar (4 [not 3 as stated in album credits])
- Dwayne Kerr – flute (5, 11, 12)
- Jazz Bell, Sam Bell, Tisha Creer, Alfredo Gray, Robert Pack, A. Pérez – background vocals (5)
- Eevin Wright, Rod Rice – handclaps (5)
- M-1, Stic.man – vocals (6)
- Dead Prez – rap, drum programming (6)
- Roy Hargrove – trumpet, vocals (8)
- Queen Latifah, Angie Stone, Bahamadia – vocals (9)
- Common – vocals (11)
- Raphael Saadiq – bass guitar (11)

=== Production ===
- Producers: Freakquency, Dead Prez, Raphael Saadiq
- Executive producers: Erykah Badu, Kedar Massenburg
- Co-executive producers: James Poyser, Rashad Smith, Tom Soares, R.C. Williams
- Recording Engineer: Tom Soares
- Assistant engineers: Shinobu Mitsuoka (4), Tim Olmstead (5)
- Mixing: Tom Soares, Leslie Brathwaite (7), Brian Stanley (8)
- Mastering: Chris Athens (exc. 7), Robert Wechsler (7)
- Creative director: Sandy Brummels
- Vocal Coaching: Erykah Badu, Lis Lewis, David Angerstein
- Art direction: Erykah Badu, Kenny J. Gravillis
- Drawing: Erykah Badu
- Photography: Marc Baptiste
- Make-up: Melanie Harris
- Stylist: Carlton Jones

== Charts ==
=== Weekly charts ===
Chart (2003)	Peak position
Australian Albums (ARIA)	169
Austrian Albums (Ö3 Austria)	64
Canadian Albums (Nielsen SoundScan)	47
Danish Albums (Hitlisten)	11
Dutch Albums (Album Top 100)	42
Finnish Albums (Suomen virallinen lista)	14
German Albums (Offizielle Top 100)	57
Italian Albums (FIMI)	15
Japanese Albums (Oricon)	42
Norwegian Albums (VG-lista)	9
Polish Albums (ZPAV)	32
Swedish Albums (Sverigetopplistan)	7
Swiss Albums (Schweizer Hitparade)	32
UK Albums (Official Charts)	93
UK R&B Albums (Official Charts)	17
US Billboard 200	3
US Top R&B/Hip-Hop Albums (Billboard)	2

=== Year-end charts ===
Chart (2003)	Position
US Billboard 200	191
US Top R&B/Hip-Hop Albums (Billboard)	68
