= Hotel Memling =

Coordinates: 4.304337684899321°S 15.312232515120382°E

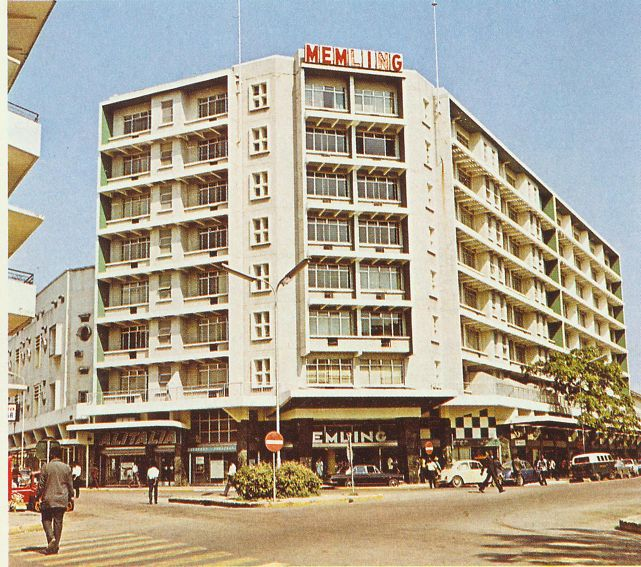
- Hotel Memling in the 1970's
- Interactive map of the Hotel Memling area

General information
- Location: Avenue du Tchad 5B, Kinshasa / Gombe, DR Congo
- Opened: 1937 (89 years ago)
- Owner: Sabena Hotels

Other information
- Number of stores: 20
- Number of rooms: 159
- Number of suites: 21
- Number of restaurants: 2
- Number of bars: 2
- Facilities: 3 banquet halls

Website
- Official website

The Hotel Memling is a five-star hotel in Kinshasa, Democratic Republic of the Congo.

== History ==
Hotel Memling was built between 1937 and 1964, in Léopoldville (modern-day Kinshasa) in Belgian Congo by Sabena, the former Belgian airline, offering accommodation to its passengers and clients. It is located near the river in the neighborhood that is today known as Gombe, in the center of the city, between Boulevard du 30 juin and the Grand Market of Kinshasa.

The hotel, modernised by numerous renovations since 1964, including in 1989 by architectural firm Henri Montois and after the 1991 and 1993 Kinshasa riots, now has a number of rooms, banquet halls and conference rooms. Along with Grand Hotel of Kinshasa and the Hotel Venus, it is one of the most famous and prestigious hotels in the city.

Following the collapse of Sabena in 2001, the future of the hotel was uncertain. At the end of 2001, it was managed (in bankruptcy) by the Compagnie des Grands Hôtels Africains.

The hotel is named after Belgian painter Hans Memling.

== The hotel today ==
The hotel has been the site of seminars, receptions, protests, openings, press conferences and shows in Kinshasa. International agreements have also been signed there, including the agreement for a EUFOR mission in the country.

In 1994, the hotel was the site of a party honoring Congolese singer Abeti Masikini.

In 2009, the FIFA World Cup trophy made a stop at the hotel on the way to South Africa for the games.

On June 29 and 30, 2010, Belgian journalist Nathalie Maleux presented her news broadcast live from the hotel on RTBF, to commemorate the 50th anniversary of Congolese independence.
