= You Got Me (The Roots song) =

Single by the Roots featuring Erykah Badu and Eve

from the album Things Fall Apart
- Released: January 25, 1999
- Genre: Neo soul
- Length: 4:19
- Label: MCA
- Songwriters: Ahmir Thompson; Tariq Trotter; Kamal Gray; Rahzel Brown; Karl Jenkins; Kyle Jones; Leonard Hubbard; Scott Storch; Eve Jeffers; Jill Scott
- Producers: The Grand Wizzards; Scott Storch (co.)

The Roots singles chronology
"Adrenaline!" (1998)	"You Got Me" (1999)	"The Next Movement" (1999)

Erykah Badu singles chronology
"One" (1998)	"You Got Me" (1999)	"Southern Gul" (1999)

Eve singles chronology
"You Got Me" (1999)	"Girlfriend/Boyfriend" (1999)

"You Got Me" is a song by American hip-hop band The Roots, featuring vocals from Erykah Badu (who sings the chorus) and Eve, then known as Eve of Destruction, who raps the second verse but does not appear in the music video. The track was released as a single from the band's fourth studio album, Things Fall Apart (1999), in January 1999.

== Background ==
"You Got Me" was co-written by musician Jill Scott, who recorded vocals for the song's chorus and bridge. Her part was subsequently re-recorded by Badu at the insistence of MCA Records, who wanted a higher-profile collaboration for the album's official lead single (at the time, Scott was relatively unknown outside Philadelphia). When the group later went on tour, Scott joined them during performances of the song. The original version was later released on the 2005 compilation Home Grown! The Beginners Guide to Understanding the Roots, Volume One.

The song garnered the Roots and Badu a Grammy Award for Best Rap Performance by a Duo or Group in 2000. In 2011, the Roots, Badu and Scott all performed the song together at VH1 Divas Celebrates Soul.

In 2026, after 26 years of the Grammy win, The Recording Academy and The Black Music Collective, fixed a technicality at the 2026 Recording Academy Honors by awarding Eve the Grammy Award for her contribution to the song. The award was presented by Harvey Mason Jr. In Eve's acceptance speech, she acknowledges that "what is yours, never can miss you" and credited radio personality Ebro for not giving up about the issue, placing it at forefront.

== Music video ==
The music video for "You Got Me" was directed by Charles Stone III and features cameos from rapper and actor Common, plus Tracy Morgan as a rider on the bus.

== Track listing ==
European maxi-CD single

1. "You Got Me"
2. "Adrenaline!"
3. "New Year's @ Jay Dee's"
4. "You Got Me" (Me Tienes Remix)
5. "You Got Me" (Cris Remix) bka Cris Prolific

== Charts ==
=== Weekly charts ===
Weekly chart performance for "You Got Me"
Chart (1999)	Peak position
Canada Top Singles (RPM)	55
France (SNEP)	28
Germany (GfK)	25
Netherlands (Single Top 100)	46
New Zealand (Recorded Music NZ)	37
Scottish Singles Sales (Official Charts)	80
Switzerland (Schweizer Hitparade)	15
UK Singles (Official Charts)	31
UK Dance (Official Charts)	3
UK Hip Hop/R&B (Official Charts)	7
US Billboard Hot 100	39
US Hot R&B/Hip-Hop Songs (Billboard)	11
US Hot Rap Songs (Billboard)	19
US Rhythmic Airplay (Billboard)	35

=== Year-end charts ===
Year-end chart performance for "You Got Me"
Chart (1999)	Position
US Hot R&B/Hip-Hop Songs (Billboard)	45

== Certifications ==
Certifications for "You Got Me"
Region	Certification	Certified units/sales
New Zealand (RMNZ)	Gold	15,000^{‡}
United Kingdom (BPI)	Silver	200,000^{‡}
^{‡} Sales+streaming figures based on certification alone.

== Release history ==
Region	Date	Format(s)	Label(s)	Ref(s).
United States	January 25–26, 1999	Rhythmic contemporary; urban radio	MCA	
United Kingdom	February 22, 1999	12-inch vinyl; CD	MCA	
