= 7 (Zap Mama album) =

Studio album by Zap Mama
- Released: February 25, 1997
- Genre: Worldbeat
- Length: 60:04
- Labels: Luaka Bop, Virgin
- Producers: Marie Daulne, Yannick Fonderie, Michael Franti

Zap Mama chronology
Sabsylma (1994)	7 (1997)	A Ma Zone (1999)

7 or Seven is an album by Zap Mama, released in 1997 on Luaka Bop Records.

I made music on Seven the same way as on the other albums. I only used acoustic instruments... I'm looking for instruments that have vocal sounds, forgotten instruments like the guimbri... The first and second albums were about the voice, what came before. This album is about introducing those sounds into modern, Western life.

— Marie Daulne

== Production ==
The album moved away from strictly a capella forms, incorporating more instrumentation and hip hop influences.

== Critical reception ==
Professional ratings
Review scores
Source	Rating
AllMusic	4/5 stars
Robert Christgau	(2-star Honorable Mention)
The Encyclopedia of Popular Music	3/5 stars

Westword wrote that "the songs feature percussion, guitar, drums and assorted string instruments ... the all-female format has been ditched in favor of a more diverse crew of musicians who work to support Daulne's haunting vocals." The Chicago Tribune wrote that "Daulne's already eclectic vision is stretched to the breaking point, incorporating blues, hip hop, funk and reggae voicings with rhythms from Morocco and Mali." Tucson Weekly wrote that the songs "open a sensual, multicultural dialogue, seamlessly weaving together diverse genres--Pygmy chants, pop world beats, hip hop, and reggae--and incorporating the influences of collaborators like rasta man U-Roy and Spearhead's Michael Franti."

== Track listing ==
1. Jogging à Tombouctou (Anita Daulne, Bachir Attar, Fadimata Wallet, Mama Camberlin, Marie Daulne, Sabine Kabongo; arr. M. Daulne/S. Kabongo) 4:59
2. New World (A, Daulne, M. Daulne, U-Roy; arr. JL Daulne, Ange Nawasadio) 3:15
3. Baba Hooker (M. Daulne, Michael Franti; arr. M. Daulne, Franti) 5:24
4. Belgo Zaïroise (M. Daulne; arr. M. Daulne, S. Kabongo) 5:22
5. African Sunset (Alpheus Mnyandu; arr. M. Daulne, S. Kabongo) 4:53
6. Damn Your Eyes (Barbara Myrick, Steve Bogard; arr. A. Daulne, M. Daulne, Aningi, S. Kabongo) 4:07
7. Poetry Man (Phoebe Snow; arr. Franti) 4:57
8. Warmth (M. Daulne, Angilique Willkie; arr. M. Daulne) 5:33
9. Téléphone (M. Daulne, Cecilia Kankonda; arr. A. & M. Daulne) 3:48
10. Nostalgie Amoureuse (Willkie, M. Daulne; arr. M. Daulne) 5:13
11. Timidity (M. Daulne, Kabongo, A Horse A Bucket and a Spoon; arr. M. Daulne, S. Kabongo) 3:05
12. Eie Buma (A. Daulne, M. Daulne; arr. A. & M. Daulne) 3:19
13. Kesia Yanga (M. Daulne; arr. M. Daulne) 5:23
14. Illioi (M. Daulne, Willkie; arr. M. Daulne) 5:33

== Personnel ==
- Marie Daulne: Lead Vocal, Percussion, Didgeridoo, Guimbri, Shekere (Kashishi)
- Fatimata Wallet, Mama Camberlin, Sabine Kabongo, Watanga Rema, U-Roy, Michael Franti, Angilique Willkie, Jean-Louis Daulne, Bernadette Aningi, Quental Kesia: Additional Vocals
- Amanou, Dizzy Mandjeku, David James, Tom Van Stiphout: Guitars
- Yannic Fonderie, Hans Francken: Keyboards
- Carl Young: Bass, Keyboards
- Luk Michiels, Michel Hatzidjordju: Bass (Michiels also played double bass)
- Vincent Piernes: Double Bass
- Otti Van Der Werf: Guimbri
- Charlie Hunter: Harmonica
- Stephane Galland, Bruno Meeus, Bilou Doneaux: Drums, Percussion
- Sidiki Diabat: Shekere

Production

- Produced By Marie Daulne, Yannick Fonderie & Michael Franti
- Co-Producers: Anita Daulne & Sabine Kabongo
- Recorded & Engineered By Mister Big Jo Francken (instruments) & Erwin Autrique (vocals)
- Mixed By Erwin Autrique, Mister Big Jo Francken & Michael Franti
- Mastered By Tony Cousins
- Photography By Jurgen Rogiers
