= The Next Movement =

Single by The Roots

from the album Things Fall Apart
- Released: 1999
- Genre: Alternative hip-hop
- Length: 4:10
- Label: MCA
- Songwriters: Ahmir Thompson; Tariq Trotter; Kamal Gray; Leonard Hubbard
- Producer: Kamal Gray

The Roots singles chronology
"You Got Me" (1998)	"The Next Movement" (1999)	"Break You Off" (2002)

"The Next Movement" is a single by The Roots from their fourth album Things Fall Apart (1999). The track features scratching from DJ Jazzy Jeff and background vocals from R&B duo Jazzyfatnastees. Randall Roberts of the Riverfront Times called it "one of the best singles of the '90s". Charles Stone III directed the song's music video.

== Track listing ==
1. "The Next Movement" (radio version) – 3:45
2. "You Got Me (The Q-Cru Radio Mix)" (featuring Erykah Badu) – 3:45
3. "Without a Doubt" (radio version) – 3:08
4. "The Next Movement" (instrumental) – 4:30
