= Danger (Erykah Badu song) =

Single by Erykah Badu

from the album Worldwide Underground
- Released: August 4, 2003
- Recorded: 2002
- Studio: Electric Lady Studios (New York, NY)
- Genre: R&B; hip hop soul
- Length: 5:49
- Label: Motown
- Songwriter(s): Erykah Badu; James Poyser; Rashad Smith; R.C. Williams
- Producer(s): Erykah Badu; R.C. Williams; James Poyser; Rashad Smith

Erykah Badu singles chronology
| "Love of My Life (An Ode to Hip-Hop)" (2002) | "Danger" (2003) | "Back in the Day (Puff)" (2003) |

"Danger" is a song recorded by American singer Erykah Badu for her third studio album Worldwide Underground (2003). It was written and produced by Badu, James Poyser, Rashad Smith and R.C. Williams. The song samples and is a sequel to Badu's single "Otherside of the Game" (1997), being set further along in the couple's relationship, after the protagonist's boyfriend has been arrested. It was released as the lead single from Worldwide Underground on August 4, 2003, by Motown Records.

A minor commercial success, "Danger" peaked at number 82 on the US Billboard Hot 100 and number 27 on the Hot R&B/Hip-Hop Songs. Since its release, the song has been performed live on almost all of Badu's concert tours.

== Track listings and formats ==
US 12-inch vinyl

1. "Danger" (album version) – 6:29
2. "Danger" (radio edit) – 4:24
3. "Danger" (radio edit instrumental) – 4:24

European CD single

1. "Danger" (radio edit) – 4:24
2. "Danger" (Edroc Remix) – 4:26

European maxi CD single

1. "Danger" (radio edit) – 4:24
2. "Danger" (album version) – 6:29
3. "Danger" (Edroc Remix) – 4:26
4. "Danger" (Afreex Remix) (featuring Thundastorm) – 4:47

== Charts ==
Weekly chart performance for "Danger"
| Chart (2003) | Peak position |
|---|---|
| US Billboard Hot 100 | 82 |
| US Hot R&B/Hip-Hop Songs (Billboard) | 27 |

== Release history ==
Release dates and formats for "Danger"
| Region | Date | Format(s) | Label(s) | Ref. |
|---|---|---|---|---|
| United States | August 4, 2003 | Urban contemporary radio | Motown | |
| United States | August 5, 2003 | 12-inch vinyl; rhythmic contemporary radio | Motown | |
