= Ancestry in Progress =

Studio album by Zap Mama
- Released: 2004
- Genres: Afropop, soul, hip hop
- Label: Luaka Bop/V2
- Producers: Marie Daulne, Anthony Tidd, Richard Nichols

Zap Mama chronology
A Ma Zone (1999)	Ancestry in Progress (2004)

Ancestry in Progress is an album by Zap Mama, released in 2004. Marie Daulne, Zap Mama's leader, deemed the music "Afropean".

The album peaked at No. 1 on Billboard's World Albums chart.

== Production ==
The album was mostly recorded in Philadelphia, where Daulne worked with musicians associated with the Roots. It contains contributions from Talib Kweli, Erykah Badu, Questlove, Bahamadia, and Common. Daulne sings in French and English, while also employing chants from Pygmy music.

== Critical reception ==
Professional ratings
Review scores
Source	Rating
AllMusic	3.5/5 stars
Robert Christgau	(3-star Honorable Mention)
The Encyclopedia of Popular Music	4/5 stars
Philadelphia Daily News	B+
Rolling Stone	2/5 stars
USA Today	3.5/4 stars

Exclaim! thought that "'Bandy Bandy', with Erykah Badu, stands out because of its polished immediacy." The Baltimore Sun determined that "Daulne blends the ancient (her trademark pygmy onomatopoeic vocal techniques and chants) with the present (smoothed- out, atmospheric grooves)."

The New York Times concluded: "Half of the album comes across simply as neo-soul with a Belgian accent. But the other half—especially 'Show Me the Way'—meshes Zap Mama's dizzying, ping-ponging vocal polyphony with pithy hip-hop beats and a pan-African assortment of guitar curlicues." The Sydney Morning Herald opined: "Singing in both French and English, she's a breathy African Bjork one minute, an operatic Afro-funk diva the next." Rolling Stone considered that "despite rap cameos and world-beat sound effects, the grooves are as bland as bad neosoul, and the songs sound like bundles of self-consciously eclectic singing."

AllMusic wrote that "this is far more an urban recording, where urban pop and nu-soul are informed by worldbeat esthetics rather than the other way around."

== Track listing ==
1. Intro
2. Sweet Melody
3. Vivre
4. Bandy Bandy (feat. Erykah Badu)
5. Yelling Away (feat. Questlove, Common, Talib Kweli)
6. Show Me the Way (feat. Questlove, Bahamadia and Lady Alma
7. Follow Me
8. Miss Q'N
9. Yaku
10. Ca Varie Varie
11. Alright
12. Cache Cache
13. LeÇon N°5
14. Wadidyusay? (feat. Scratch)
15. Zap Bébés
