= Back in the Day (Puff) =

Single by Erykah Badu

from the album Worldwide Underground
- Released: October 6, 2003
- Studio: Palmyra Studios (Dallas, TX); The Studio (Philadelphia, PA); Electric Lady Studios (New York, NY)
- Genre: Funk; soul; R&B
- Length: 4:47
- Label: Motown
- Songwriter(s): Erykah Badu; James Poyser; Rashad Smith; Audrie Magget
- Producer(s): Erykah Badu; James Poyser; Rashad "Ringo" Smith

Erykah Badu singles chronology
"Danger" (2003)	"Back in the Day (Puff)" (2003)	"Get Live" (2006)

"Back in the Day (Puff)" is a song recorded by American singer Erykah Badu for her third studio album Worldwide Underground (2003). It was written and produced by Badu, James Poyser and Rashad Smith, and was co-written by Audrie Magget. The song was released as the second and final single from Worldwide Underground on October 6, 2003, by Motown Records.

== Track listing ==
US 12-inch vinyl

1. "Back in the Day (Puff)" (album version) – 4:47
2. "Back in the Day (Puff)" (radio edit) – 4:27
3. "Back in the Day (Puff)" (instrumental) – 4:24

== Charts ==
Weekly chart performance for "Back in the Day (Puff)"
Chart (2003–2004)	Peak position
US Adult R&B Songs (Billboard)	13
US Hot R&B/Hip-Hop Songs (Billboard)	62

== Release history ==
Release dates and formats for "Back in the Day (Puff)"
Region	Date	Format(s)	Label(s)	Ref.
United States	October 6, 2003	Urban adult contemporary radio	Motown	
