= Love of My Life (An Ode to Hip-Hop) =

Single by Erykah Badu featuring Common

from the album Brown Sugar and Worldwide Underground
- Released: August 5, 2002
- Recorded: 2001
- Studio: Electric Lady Studios (New York, NY); The Kitchen (Dallas, TX)
- Genre: R&B; hip hop
- Length: 3:50 (radio edit); 5:37 (soundtrack version)
- Label: MCA
- Songwriters: Erykah Badu; Lonnie Rashid Lynn; Madukwu Chinwah; Robert Ozuma; James Poyser; Raphael Saadiq; Rashad Smith; Glen Standridge
- Producer: Raphael Saadiq

Erykah Badu singles chronology
"Sweet Baby" (2001)	"Love of My Life (An Ode to Hip-Hop)" (2002)	"Danger" (2003)

Common singles chronology
"Dance for Me" (2002)	"Love of My Life (An Ode to Hip-Hop)" (2002)	"While I'm Dancin'" (2002)

"Love of My Life (An Ode to Hip-Hop)" is a song recorded by American singer Erykah Badu for the Brown Sugar soundtrack (2002). It features American rapper Common, who co-wrote the song alongside Badu, Madukwu Chinwah, Robert Ozuma, James Poyser, Rashad Smith, Glen Standridge and the song's sole producer Raphael Saadiq. The song follows the film and its soundtrack's common lyrical theme of personifying hip hop. It was released as the lead single from Brown Sugar on August 5, 2002, by MCA Records.

A commercial success, "Love of My Life (An Ode to Hip-Hop)" spent four weeks atop the US Hot R&B/Hip-Hop Songs and reached number nine on the Billboard Hot 100. Critically acclaimed, the song won the Soul Train Lady of Soul Award for Best Solo R&B/Soul Single and the Grammy Award for Best R&B Song. A year after its release, it was included on international editions of Badu's third studio album Worldwide Underground (2003).

== Remix ==
The official remix of "Love of My Life (An Ode to Hip-Hop)", entitled "Love of My Life Worldwide" appeared on Badu's third studio album Worldwide Underground (2003). The remix featured guest raps by Queen Latifah, Bahamadia and Angie Stone, and sampled "Funk You Up" by the rap group the Sequence, of which Stone was a member. Another version of the remix, titled "Funk You Up! (Love Of My Life Remix)", features Badu rapping different lyrics.

== Track listings and formats ==
US 12-inch vinyl

1. "Love of My Life (An Ode to Hip Hop)" (radio edit) – 3:50
2. "Love of My Life (An Ode to Hip Hop)" (instrumental) – 4:28
3. "Love of My Life (An Ode to Hip Hop)" (album version) – 3:50
4. "Love of My Life (An Ode to Hip Hop)" (a cappella) – 4:25

European CD single

1. "Love of My Life (An Ode to Hip Hop)" (radio edit) – 3:50
2. "Danger" (Mercury Remix) – 3:59

European maxi CD single

1. "Love of My Life (An Ode to Hip Hop)" (radio edit) – 3:50
2. "Love of My Life (An Ode to Hip Hop)" (album version) – 3:50
3. "Love of My Life (An Ode to Hip Hop)" (instrumental) – 4:28
4. "Danger" (Mercury Remix) – 3:59

== Charts ==
=== Weekly charts ===
Chart (2002–2003)	Peak position
US Billboard Hot 100	9
US Adult R&B Songs (Billboard)	4
US Hot R&B/Hip-Hop Songs (Billboard)	1

=== Year-end charts ===
Chart (2002)	Position
US Hot R&B/Hip-Hop Songs (Billboard)	67

Chart (2003)	Position
US Billboard Hot 100	78
US Hot R&B/Hip-Hop Songs (Billboard)	19

== Release history ==
Release dates and formats for "Love of My Life (An Ode to Hip-Hop)"
Region	Date	Format(s)	Label(s)	Ref.
United States	August 5, 2002	Urban contemporary radio	MCA	
United States	August 20, 2002	12-inch vinyl	MCA	
