= Marie Daulne =

Belgian Congolese singer (born 1964)

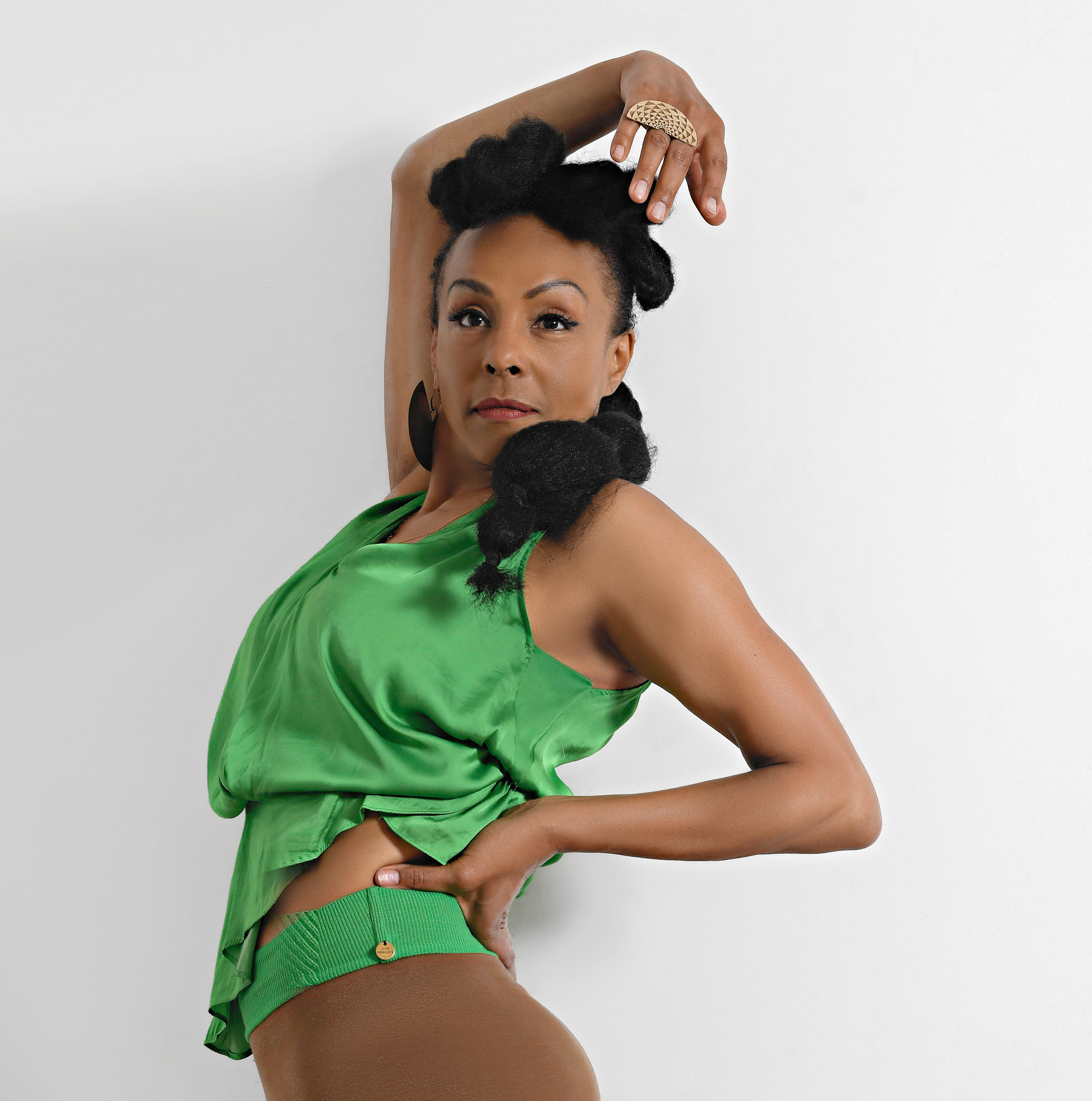
- Daulne in October 2010

Background information
- Also known as: Zap Mama
- Born: October 20, 1964 (age 61); Isiro, Zaire
- Genres: R&B; hip-hop
- Occupations: Singer; songwriter; composer; performer; artist; activist

Marie Daulne /ˈduːlɪn/ (born 20 October 1964), also known as Zap Mama, is a Belgian singer-songwriter, performer, composer, lyricist, activist, video artist, and ethnic-vocal therapist born in the Democratic Republic of the Congo. Daulne is the founder and lead singer of the music group Zap Mama, whose second album, Adventures in Afropea 1, was the best-selling world music album in 1993.

Daulne specializes in polyphonic, harmonic music with a mixture of African instruments, R&B, and hip-hop, and emphasizes voice in her music. She has said her mission is to be a bridge between the European and the African and bring the two cultures together with her music. Daulne calls her music "Afro-European".

As a solo artist, her remix of James Crawford's 1953 song "Iko-iko" was featured in the film Mission: Impossible 2.

== Early life ==
Daulne was born in the city of Isiro in east Zaire (now the Democratic Republic of the Congo). Her father, Cyrille Daulne, was a white Walloon (French-speaking Belgian); her mother, Bernadette Aningi, was a black Congolese Bantu woman from Kisangani. She was their fourth child. When she was a few days old, her father was captured and killed by Simba rebels, who were opposed to mixed-race relationships, during the Congo Crisis. Marie's mother, with her brother and two sisters, survived by hiding in the forest. Her three older siblings were sent to be protected by Pygmies. Several months later, they were airlifted by Belgian paratroopers and flown to Belgium.

During her youth, Daulne trained in athletics and volleyball with aspirations of competing professionally, but a leg injury led her to abandon sports and focus on music. Daulne studied at the Academie Royale des Beaux Arts de Bruxelles and La Cambre, and also received training in dance, choreography, acrobatics, and jazz performance. Her early musical influences included Congolese vocal traditions as well as jazz, blues, reggae, and hip-hop.

=== Musical interests ===
Daulne was exposed to both Congolese and Belgian musical traditions while growing up. Her mother maintained Congolese vocal traditions within the family, while her father's relatives introduced her to Walloon and liturgical music. During adolescence, she also developed an interest in American jazz, blues, reggae, hip-hop, and vocal harmony traditions.

Although Daulne recalled her mother singing songs from Congo Kinshasa around the house, she did not teach them to her children, fearing they would "grow up too African" and instead stressing mastery of French. However, while Daulne was encouraged to adopt Belgian language and culture, her mother kept Congolese music alive in the household. For example, she taught Daulne to "sing to call the spirits of the peace ... before you eat or do something". Daulne's mother also made Daulne and her sister learn polyphonic singing.

Daulne said she rejected African traditional music growing up, as it wasn't discussed or practiced in school, seeing it as boring and somewhat shameful. However, while Daulne was away at school, she missed those African traditional songs. As such, she and her sister started to sing African melodies, leading to the formation of Zap Mama.

After hearing a recording of traditional Pygmy music, Daulne returned to Congo-Kinshasa in 1982 or 1984 to learn about her heritage and train in pygmy onomatopoeic vocal techniques. Although Daulne draws inspiration from Africa, she does not call Africa home, feeling she was treated as a Belgian tourist during her trip back to the Congo.

== Musical career ==
Zap Mama has released nine full-length albums: Zap Mama (1991; re-released in 1993 as Adventures in Afropea 1, minus the single track Etupe), Sabsylma (1994), Seven (1997), A Ma Zone (1999), Ancestry in Progress (2004), Supermoon (2007), ReCreation (2009), Eclectic Breath (2018) and Odyssée (2022).

=== Group formation, Adventures in Afropea 1 and Sabsylma ===
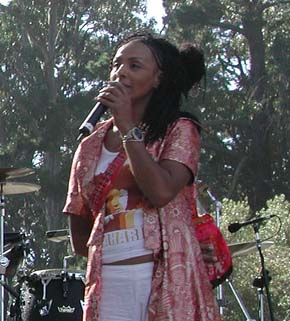
Marie Daulne says her mission is to be a bridge between the European and the African and bring the two cultures together with her music. Daulne specializes in polyphonic, harmonic music with a mixture of heavily infused African instruments, R&B, and Hip-hop. Daulne emphasizes voice in all her music, as she says "the voice is an instrument itself."

After returning from Zaire to Belgium, Daulne spent several years singing in jazz cafes in Brussels.

In 1990, Daulne founded the group Zap Mama. The original idea behind the group was a vocal ensemble in which no singer would dominate the others, having no lead voice.

Daulne first met Sylvie Nawasadio when they sang together on the train to school; they met again at university in Brussels, when Daulne asked Nawasadio to be part of a "cultural singing group". She subsequently met Sabine Kabongo in Brussels as well.

Daulne auditioned many female singers looking for the right combination of voices for an a cappella ensemble, specifically looking for girls that, like Daulne, were both African and European; according to Daulne, "I wanted to put these two sounds together to prove that to have blood from white and black was perfect harmony on the inside." Through her audition, Daulne discovered Marie Alfonso, and later Sally Nyolo.

Marie Daulne eventually recruited her sister Anita Daulne, Sylvie Nawasadio, Sabine Kabongo, Cecilia Kankonda, Céline T'hooft, and Fanchon Nuyens. Daulne said she called the group "Zap Mama" instead of naming it after herself because "it was like the spirit of the ancestors talking to me and using me to translate what's going on". She has said that the "Zap" stands for “zapping culture from the north and south”, and the "Mama" means that the group uses “traditional sounds from mother earth.”

Zap Mama received initial support from the French Belgian Community Government's cultural department. The group came to the attention of Teddy Hillaert when he saw them perform at the Ancienne Belgique in Brussels; he later became their manager. The group began recording their first record, Zap Mama, at Studio Daylight in Brussels. The album was completed in October 1991 and released by Crammed Discs, the Belgian record label of Marc Hollander and Vincent Kenis.

==== Adventures in Afropea 1 ====
In 1992, Zap Mama came to the United States for the first time to perform at New Music Seminar in New York City. There, they met David Byrne and agreed to let him reissue Zap Mama's first recordings as Adventures in Afropea 1 through Luaka Bop Records. By the end of the year, the first album stayed at the top of the Billboard charts for 11 weeks in the world music chart.

Luaka Bop Records repackaged the first Crammed Discs release for American listeners in 1993 as Adventures in Afropea 1. By the end of the year, Billboard announced it was the top seller for "world music." Zap Mama went on tour, playing in Central Park, Olympia, and the jazz festival of Montreux, among other locations. After the success of Adventures in Afropea 1, Daulne said the record company "wanted to mould us into a poppy girl band, but I said, 'No, you'll kill me', and I stopped. Everyone was asking why I wanted to stop when we'd finally arrived at the top. But I felt that it was completely wrong. I wasn't ready. I wasn't strong enough. The manager said that if I stopped then, I'd be killing my career, but it was my decision."

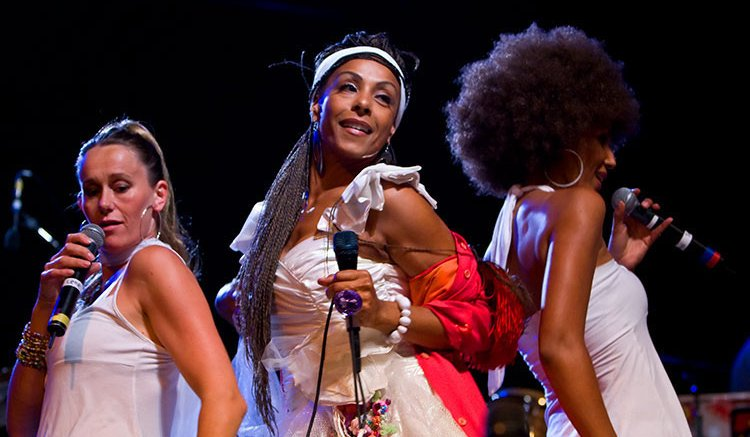
Daulne (center) performs with Zap Mama at Bumbershoot 2007 in Seattle on 3 September 2007.

==== Sabsylma ====
Their next album, Sabsylma, was released in 1994. It contained music with Indian, Moroccan and Australian influences and earned Zap Mama a Grammy nomination for Best World Music Album. Daulne explained that the sharper sound of Sabsylma was due to the influence of American music and exposure to the hectic sounds from being on the road. Daulne also broadened her music to embrace other cultures on Sabsylma.

Daulne used an organic process to improvise her music in the studio. According to Daulne, "[d]uring the rehearsals, we light some candles, start a tape-recorder, close our eyes, and start making up a story. On that, we start adding sounds. We let ourselves go. We are carried away by the music."

Zap Mama was invited to perform with the Neville Brothers, Ai Jarreau and Bobby Mcferrin. Zap Mama has toured the United States, Japan and Europe. The group also contributed to the soundtrack of Mathieu Kassovitch's film La Haine.

While Sabsylma was being created, Director Violaine de Villers made a documentary, Mizike Mama (1993), that presents a group portrait of Zap Mama. The film focuses on Daulne and discusses the implications of membership in a racially mixed group that fuses African rhythms and vocal tones with European polyphony. The documentary won the International Visual Music award for Best Popular Music TV Documentary.

In 1995, Marie Daulne signed, co-created and performed an advert for Coca-Cola which was broadcast worldwide during the 1996 Summer Olympics in Atlanta (single: Brrlak /Take me KoKo).

=== Solo artistry, Seven and A Ma Zone ===
After the success of the first two albums, Daulne put her music on hold for a few years to birth and mother her daughter Kezia Quental, who later adopted the stage name K.ZIA. In 1996, Daulne decided to dissolve the group and make a formal break from a cappella, retaining the Zap Mama name but looking for new collaborators in the United States. Daulne was the only member of Zap Mama to return for the recording of Seven. Unlike the group's past albums, she included male musicians and vocalists, and increased the number of instruments and the number of songs in English. "I made music on Seven the same way as on the other albums. I only used acoustic instruments... I'm looking for instruments that have vocal sounds, forgotten instruments like the guimbri... The first and second albums were about the voice, what came before. This album is about introducing those sounds into modern, Western life," said Daulne. Daulne had help on the album from Wathanga Rema, from Cameroon. Daulne's sister Anita also contributed to both songwriting and vocals.

Daulne's third album, Seven, was released in 1997. Its title refers to the seven senses of a human being: the traditional five, in addition to emotion and "the power to heal with music, calm with color, to soothe the sick soul with harmony", according to Daulne.

Daulne's next album was A Ma Zone (1999). The title is a wordplay meaning both "Amazone," the female warrior, and "A Ma Zone" (in my zone). That same year, Zap Mama made "Iko-Iko" for Mission: Impossible 2 soundtrack, a cover of "Jock-A-Mo" by Sugar Boy & the Cane Cutters.

=== Ancestry in Progress and Supermoon ===
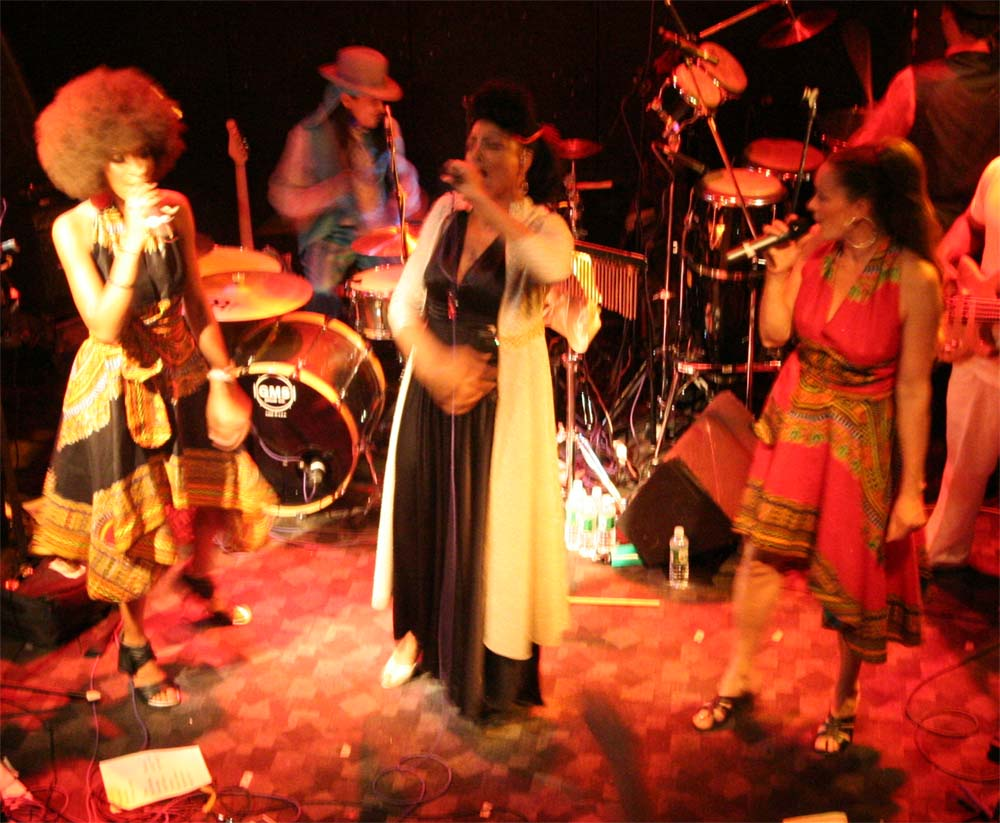
Daulne (center) toured in 2007 to support the release of Supermoon appearing at the 8 x 10 in Baltimore, Maryland on 1 November 2007.

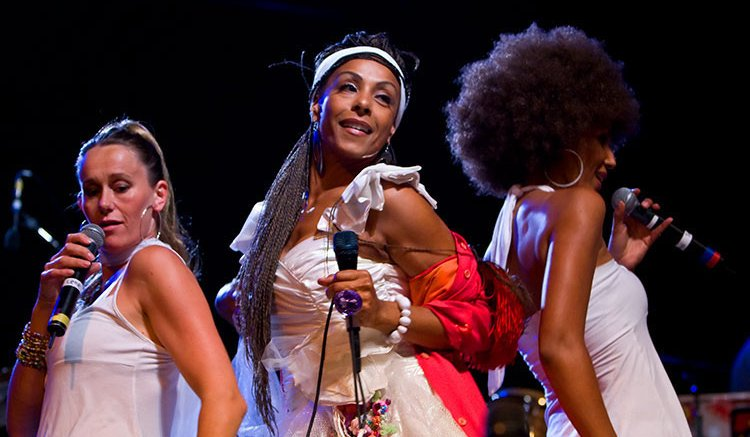
Daulne (center) performs with Zap Mama at Bumbershoot 2007 in Seattle on September 3, 2007.

Daulne moved to New York in 2000. "I've never been welcome in any country as my own country," says Daulne. "In Europe, they talk to me as if I'm from Congo. In Congo, they act like I'm from Europe. The first time I felt at home was in New York. I said, ‘Here is my country. Everybody is from somewhere else. I feel so comfortable here.'" Ancestry in Progress (2000) reflects Daulne's new life in the United States. "The American beat is a revolution all over the world," Daulne says. "Everybody listens to it and everybody follows it. But the beat of the United States was inspired by the beat coming from Africa. Not just its structure, but the sound of it. This is the source of modern sounds, the history of the beat, starting from little pieces of wood banging against one another, and arriving on the big sound-systems today. It's genius. So I wanted to create an album about the evolution of old ancestral vocal sounds, how they traveled from Africa, mixing with European and Asian sounds, and were brought to America."

In 2001 Daulne gave birth to her second child, Zekye Daulne Rogiers.

Daulne collaborated with the Roots collective in Philadelphia who acted as producers for her 2004 album Ancestry in Progress. "They invited me to do some of my sounds in one of their albums, and that was where the relationship develop[ed]," says Daulne. "The hardest [thing was] that at the time my English was so little that I had no way to express myself, so I didn’t know how it happened in the Philly world or the United States, or the way it work[ed] with studios. I was there, like in the middle of an ocean with my sounds, my spirit and my vibe." "What I like about the Roots is their instruments, the jazz background, which is helping to have a real, acoustic, organic sound," says Daulne. "If you take it and make it groovy, it seems like our life is lighter and easier. ... And I loved the beatbox which some of their members were doing, grooving with only [their] mouth." One of the tracks includes baby sounds from Daulne's youngest child, Zekey.

Ancestry in Progress (2004) reflects Daulne's new life in the United States, as it synthesizes her traditional African and European influences with American musical styles like hip-hop and R&B. "The American beat is a revolution all over the world," Daulne says. "Everybody listens to it and everybody follows it. But the beat of the United States was inspired by the beat coming from Africa. Not just its structure, but the sound of it. This is the source of modern sounds, the history of the beat, starting from little pieces of wood banging against one another, and arriving on the big sound-systems today. It's genius. So I wanted to create an album about the evolution of old ancestral vocal sounds, how they traveled from Africa, mixing with European and Asian sounds, and were brought to America."

Ancestry in Progress reached #1 on the Billboard World Music Album chart. A music video for the single "Bandy Bandy", featuring Erykah Badu, directed by Bill Fishman and produced by David Herrera (music video director), aired on VH1.

Daulne moved back to Belgium after three years in the United States and now calls Brussels home. "I lived in the United States from 2000 to 2004 and it is a place with so many stars. When I met a lot of big celebrities I realized I was not a big star and that I didn't want to be, because your life would be a habit, stuck in this and that. I prefer the singularity. I prefer to be me." Daulne finds life easier in Belgium. "I used to live in New York, and the system in Belgium is much better than in America. It’s much easier for families here." "With my family, my husband, my children, the people I love — that is home." Daulne still draws inspiration from her travels. "Currently, I feel the need to go to England, because a lot of interesting things are happening over there. In my band, there are a lot of young musicians who teach me completely new things. They challenge me - and that is the way I like it," Daulne says. Daulne also found American interests and values different from Europe. "American people are so addicted to music — sports and music," says Daulne. "Where I live, with the French influence, it's the foods that are very important, and literature — all this probably more important than sports and music."

The loss of Daulne's friend Nina de Goeyse plunged her into a deep depression and follows by the separation from the father of her second child. This forces Daulne to live between two cities, New York and Brussels.

In Supermoon (2007), Daulne's vocals take center stage. "When the audience appreciates the art of the artist, the audience becomes the sun and makes the artist shine as a full moon," says Daulne. Supermoon is also one of Daulne's most personal statements with songs like "Princess Kesia," an ode to her daughter and how she is no longer a baby but a beautiful girl. "With Supermoon, I reveal the way I chose to live when I started my career," says Daulne. "It’s very intimate…You’re seeing me very close up. I hope that’s a kind of intimacy that people will understand. I’m opening a door to who I am." "I always used to hide myself, and I'm not complaining about it, but now it is time to show my eyes and my femininity and my delicate side," said Daulne. "I am proud to be so feminine, because I have taken the time to develop the inside of my femininity. Now that I have that, I can face anybody. And if anybody challenges me, there is no problem."

=== ReCreation ===
In 2009, Zap Mama released her 7th album ReCreation, (with Terlac label CONCORD music USA), which celebrates her tradition of global influences and expresses her new attitude to her life and music. Daulne describes the inspiration behind the album as her realization that she was learning and experiencing "something new all the time." The album title refers to recreation in both senses of the word, both as self-renewal and as relaxation and pleasure. Almost all the songs on the album are collaborations with other artists, including G. Love, Vincent Cassel, and Bilal. ReCreation was nominated by the NAACP Image Awards in the Best World Music Album category.

In 2018, Zap mama released her Eighth album, Eclectic Breath a return to vocal techniques blending a cappella and beatbox Pumzi is a gathering of vocalists and human beatboxers engaged in polyphonic techniques and other catchy tunes infused with Afro, Latin and house rhythms. Zap Mama will be releasing this album without the support of a record label.

In 2019, Daulne was given an honorary master's degree by the jazz department of the Antwerp Conservatory of Music.

=== Odyssée and Body and Mind ===
Zap Mama returns with Odyssée, a resolutely modern album open to the world, written entirely in French and in which she defends the concept of Afropeanity. "In our country, unlike in the United States, Belgian-Congolese history is not documented: we have to go and find the unsung heroes. For the texts, Daulne was able to count on the help of her brother Jean-Louis Daulne and Salvatore Adamo. Daulne reaches an age when legacy is essential. Daulne's humanitarian commitment includes support for a living hero, Dr. Mukwegue, winner of the 2018 Nobel Prize.

In 2020 to 2021, Daulne undergoes training in Sonotherapy and Music Therapy, to bring her support to the women survivors of the Panzi hospital in Bukavu (Eastern Democratic Republic of the Congo).

In 2022 Daulne travels to Goma and Bukavu where she runs Ethno Vocal Therapy workshops, composes and records music with young women, and provides psychological support for the socio-economic reintegration of survivors treated by DR. Denis MUKWEGE. Daulne will be back after the screening of Thierry Michel's documentary on Chaine RTBF Belgique, in which she participated in the debate to testify about the strength of the eastern congoles woman in the name and honor of her mother, Nabindibo Aningi, a heroine and survivor of the massacres in the region and puts together the pieces of a complex jigsaw puzzle of successive wars involving hundreds of armed groups, some Congolese, some foreign, guilty of mass crimes whose primary victims are women. In the Congo, rape has become a weapon of war, with victims now numbering several generations. And it continues to this day. A debate moderated by Nathalie Maleux will take stock of the situation in the Democratic Republic of the Congo. It will bring together the documentary's director, Thierry Michel, experts in international law, geopolitics and human rights, Marie Daulne of Zap Mama, and Bernard Cadière, surgeon at Hôpital Saint-Pierre and Dr. Mukwege's right-hand man.

Daulne co-composed the soundtrack for "Enkai", the final episode of the Afrocentric animated anthology series Kizazi Moto: Generation Fire, alongside her daughter K.Zia.

Daulne continues her musical journey by offering a therapeutic experience through her online digital release, "DAY by DAY." This wellness music incorporates affirmations that aim to uplift and inspire listeners.

In 2024, Marie Daulne narrated lines written by Andrée Blouin in the documentary film Soundtrack to a Coup d'État, presented at the 2024 Sundance Film Festival. The film was later nominated for Best Documentary Feature at the 97th Academy Awards in 2025. At the awards ceremony, Zap Mama's red carpet appearance, where her outfit carried a political message in support of Congo, was covered by outlets such as The New York Times, BBC, Huffington Post, WBAL-TV, and Euronews.

That same year, Zap Mama celebrated the 30th anniversary of her career with two major concerts produced by Green House Talent: one at Ancienne Belgique in Brussels, and another at Roma in Antwerp. They featured special guests from the Belgian diaspora, including Selah Sue, K.Zia, Coely, and Fredy Massamba. In 2025, she will present a new concert concept titled Ancestry in Motion, a collaborative performance with her daughter K.Zia, centered on the theme of love and intergenerational connection, touring across Europe.

Marie Daulne officially made her debut as a theater actress in 2025, performing at the KVS Theatre in Brussels in the multilingual play Amour/Liefde, directed by Pitcho Konga Wamba. Sharing the stage with four other actresses, the production is based on L’amour est très surestimé (2007), a collection of short stories by Franco-Algerian author Brigitte Giraud.

== Other work ==
Back in Belgium, Marie Daulne teaches African polyphony and polyrhythm in private music schools in Brussels.

An active humanitarian, Daulne devotes much of her time working to protect human rights and fight global poverty with organizations such as Amnesty International, Doctors Without Borders, CARE, and the United Nations.

== Musical style ==
Daulne defines her music over the years as evolving from an a cappella quintet to instruments and a lead voice. "I’m a nomad. I like to discover my sound with different instruments, different genres. For me it’s normal. My name is Zap Mama – it’s easy to understand that it’s easy for me to zap in from one instrument to another, a culture, a style. I’m more a citizen of the world, not an American or Belgian." The word Zap also means to switch TV channels or in this context to switch cultures.

The ensemble combined the sound styles of Congolese Pygmies with the vocal styles of European choral traditions.

Daulne's music is a hybrid of African and European influences. "If people want to know where my sounds are from, I say I’m an African European," says Daulne. "There is the African American, and then there is the African European like me. My background is from Africa, and I grew up in the urban world of Europe. And I would say Afro-urban is easy to understand because it is urban music, but at the same time you have African elements in it." "I think it’s because I’m born of two cultures. From my African heritage, I receive a lot of different harmonies and sounds and ways to express melody and probably all of this makes up what I do," says Daulne. "Some say it’s African music that I do, but definitely not. I’m not African at all. My harmony is from Europe. I use things from all over the place. I use all these sounds and people can hear it. It’s because we are all human-we all want the same things."

Daulne has made trips to Africa for musical inspiration. "I've been all over Africa. I started where I was born, in the forest of Zaire. Then I went to West Africa, to discover the Tuareg, Mandingo music and griots, to South Africa in Soweto, to East Africa with the Masai and to North Africa with the Gnawa. "I focused mainly on vocal techniques," explains Daulne.

Other influences in Daulne's music include Brazil where she visited in 2008. "I fell in love. The weather, the music — I was like a child. It's amazing," Daulne says. Daulne went to Brazil "to first discover the country. The beauty of the city, the people walking, and haircuts — just feel what it is to be a woman in Brazil. I did my braid over there with a woman from the favelas and I have a friend who speaks Portuguese who was able to translate and have conversations. Now my music will have a Brazilian touch on my next album, definitely."

Daulne has traveled the world to seek cultural connections with people around the planet. "Inside me, I feel like a citizen of the world," Daulne says. "In New York, it was the case that I found a lot of people from all over the place and what we talk about is what the human being can exchange as a person. The main thing I want in songs is what the feeling of the human being is."

== Discography ==
- Zap Mama (1991)
- Adventures in Afropea 1 (US re-issue in 1993 of the 1991 debut album)
- Sabsylma (1994)
- Seven (1997)
- A Ma Zone (1999)
- Ancestry in Progress (2004)
- Supermoon (2007)
- ReCreation (2009)
- Eclectic Breath (2018)

=== Notable collaborations ===
- "Soundtrack to a Coup d'Etat," (2024) narration for documentary film premiering at 2024 Sundance Film Festival, directed by Johan Grimonprez
- Ng'endo Mukii "ENKAI" (2023) DISNEY+
- Laurent Perez Del Mar : "La montagne blanche", "l'arrivée au Banian" (2015), "Drifting"
- Antiballas (2015)
- Google doodle for International Women's Day (2014)
- G. Love & Special Sauce, "Drifting," ReCreation (2009)
- Vincent Cassel, "Paroles Paroles" and "Non Non Non," ReCreation (2009)
- Bilal, "Sorrow, Tears & Blood", Love for Sale (2001–03)
- Hans Zimmer, "Iko Iko" Paramount Mission impossible II (2000)
- Speech of Arrested Development, "I Wonder", The Grown Folks Table (2009); "Each Step Moves Us On," 1 Giant Leap 2 Sides 2 Everything Soundtrack (2008) and "W'happy Mama," A Ma Zone (1999)
- Alanis Morissette, "Arrival," 1 Giant Leap 2 Sides 2 Everything Soundtrack (2008)
- Michael Franti, "High Low," All Rebel Rockers (2009); "Hey Brotha," Supermoon (2007); "Listener Supported," Stay Human (2001); "Poetry Man" and "Baba Hooker," Seven (1997)
- Sérgio Mendes, "Waters of March," Encanto (2008)
- Kery James, "Après la pluie," À l’ombre du show business (2008)
- Tony Allen, "African Diamond," ReCreation (2009) and "1000 Ways," Supermoon (2007)
- David Gilmore, "Toma Taboo," Supermoon (2007)
- Arno, "Toma Taboo," Supermoon (2007) and "Brussels Mabel," Arno (2002)
- Ladysmith Black Mambazo, "Hello to My Baby," Long Walk to Freedom (2006)
- Carl Craig, "Bandy Bandy," Luaka Bop Remixes (2005)
- Common, Talib Kweli, and Questlove, "Yelling Away," Soundbombing III (2002)/Ancestry in Progress (2004)
- Questlove, Bahamadia, and Lady Alma, "Show Me the Way," Ancestry in Progress (2004)
- Scratch, "Wadidyusay?," Ancestry in Progress (2004)
- Erykah Badu, "Bandy Bandy," Ancestry in Progress (2004) and "Bump It," Worldwide Underground (2003)
- Common, "Ferris Wheel," Electric Circus (2002)
- DJ Krush, "Danger of Love," Zen (2001)
- Black Thought, "Rafiki," A Ma Zone (1999)
- The Roots, "Act Won (Things Fall Apart)," Things Fall Apart (1999)
- Boyd Jarvis, "Alibokolijah," Alibokolijah (1999)
- Maria Bethânia, "Glytzy," Ambar (1997)
- King Britt, "Poetry Man," Seven (1997)
- U-Roy, "New World," Seven (1997)
- Michael Franti, "Comin' to Glitcha", Chocolate Supa Highway (1997)
- Dana Bryant, "Food," Wishing from the Top (1996)
- Al Jarreau "I Shall Be Released" (1994) TARATA
- Jacques Hugelin "Le Grand REX" (1993)

=== Music in film, television, and video games ===
- Kizazi Moto (ENKAI) Disney + (2023 ) animated film
- Baadasssss (Coucou) Mario Van Peebles
- Metisse/Cafe au Lait ("Take Me Coco")
- Harsenio hall show (PLEKETE)
- So You Think You Can Dance Australia TV (Brrlak)
- Belpop classic CANVAS VRT documentary
- Pourquoi j'ai pas mangé mon père PATHE Jamel Debouz animated film)
- EA Sports' FIFA 10 ("Vibrations")
- So You Think You Can Dance ("Take Me Coco," "Moonray" and "W'happy Mama")
- Cashmere Mafia ("1000 Ways")
- Brothers & Sisters ("Supermoon")
- MTV's Road Rules ("Rafiki")
- MTV's 9th Annual Music Awards ("Iko Iko")
- Sesame Street ("Brrrlak")
- The Man ("Bandy Bandy")
- The God Who Wasn't There ("A Way Cuddy Dis")
- In the Cut ("Allo Allo")
- Tortilla Soup ("Call Waiting")
- Mission: Impossible 2 ("Iko Iko")
- La Haine ("J'attends," "Discussion," and "Songe")
- Elle Magazine commercial ("Sweet Melodie")
- Mercedes-Benz commercial ("Din Din")
- Nokia 7250 commercial ("Take Me Coco")
- BMW commercial ("Danger of Love")
- Fiat commercial ("Allo Allo")
- Where in the World Is Carmen Sandiego? ("Brrrlak")
