= James Poyser =

American record producer and songwriter

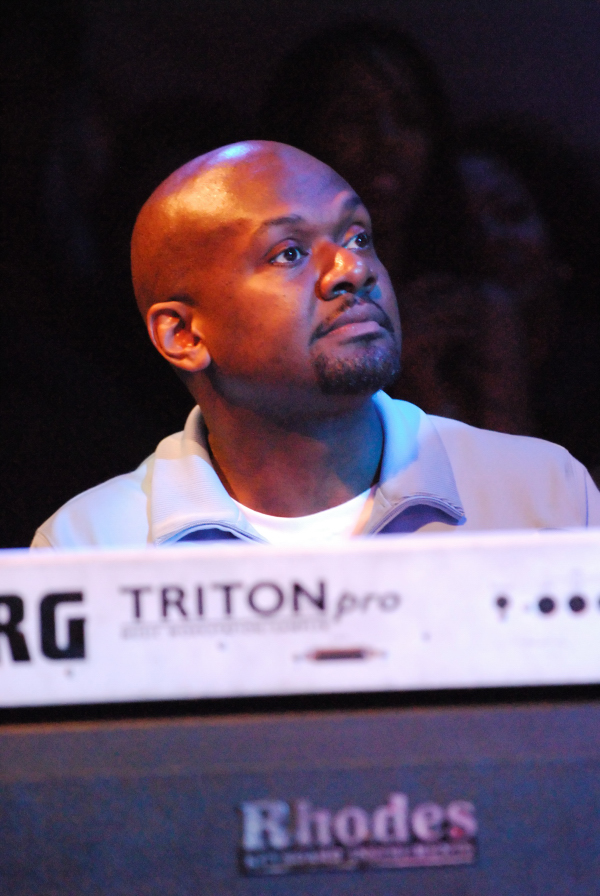
- Poyser at the Black Lily Film & Music Festival in 2007

Background information
- Also known as: Soul Glo; I Don't Want Any Trouble, I Just Want to Get Paid; I Gotta Eat; Make Sure I Get Credit For This; Y'all Goin to Pay Me, Right?; Downtown Jimmy Brown; Jimmy Baseball
- Born: James Jason Poyser
- Origin: Philadelphia, Pennsylvania, U.S.
- Genres: Neo soul; progressive soul; soul; hip-hop; jazz; pop; rock; film; gospel
- Occupations: Record producer; songwriter; multi-instrumentalist
- Instruments: Keyboards; bass; drums; percussion; guitar; vocals
- Years active: 1993–present
- Member of: The Roots, The Tonight Show Band
- Formerly of: Soulquarians; The Soultronics; The Randy Watson Experience

James Jason Poyser is an American record producer, multi-instrumentalist, and songwriter from Philadelphia, Pennsylvania. He has been a member of the hip-hop band The Roots since 2009, and plays with The Roots in the house band for The Tonight Show Starring Jimmy Fallon and formerly, Late Night with Jimmy Fallon.

== Early life and career ==
Poyser was born in Sheffield, England to Jamaican parents, and raised in West Philadelphia, Pennsylvania. He has written and produced songs for numerous artists including Erykah Badu, Mariah Carey, John Legend, Rihanna, Lauryn Hill, Common, Anthony Hamilton, D'Angelo, the Roots, Jill Scott, Al Green, Emeli Sandé, Talib Kweli, Big Sean, and Andra Day, among others.

Throughout his career, Poyser has toured and played for with high-profile artists including DJ Jazzy Jeff & The Fresh Prince, Cece Peniston, Jay-Z, Usher, Queen Latifah, D'Angelo, Elvis Costello, Hezekiah Walker, and Aretha Franklin, among others. An active session musician, he has contributed to the works of prominent musical acts such as Adele, Norah Jones, Eric Clapton, Elton John, Ozzy Osbourne, Nas, Ziggy Marley, Citizen Cope, Yebba, Snoh Aalegra, and Femi Kuti among others.

In film, he composed the score for the Academy Award-winning Two Distant Strangers, Boxing Day, and Totally Awesome, while contributing music and arrangements of Fame, Dave Chappelle's Block Party, and Jeymes Samuel's The Harder They Fall and The Book of Clarence (both for Netflix). He also scored the Hulu docu-series, The 1619 Project and the WNBA documentary, Unfinished Business by Alison Klayman, in addition to serving as a composer for the CBS television series, The Equalizer. Poyser also contributed music to the television shows The Chappelle Show, Black-ish and also composed the theme songs for Wyatt Cenac's Problem Areas, Hawthorne, and The Break with Michelle Wolf.

Poyser received a Grammy Award for Best R&B Song in 2003 for his work on Erykah Badu and Common's hit single "Love of My Life (An Ode to Hip-Hop)." He was also the executive producer on Badu's highly celebrated albums, Mama's Gun and Worldwide Underground. Poyser received two Grammy Awards, including Best R&B album, for producing John Legend's Wake Up! album in 2010. Along with his production partner Ahmir "Questlove" Thompson, he produced Al Green's album Lay it Down, which also won two Grammy Awards in 2008.

A collaborator with The Roots dating back to their fourth album, Things Fall Apart in 1999, Poyser officially joined the band in 2009. He met Jimmy Fallon in 2013 and performs in The Roots as part of the in-house band on NBC's Late Night with Jimmy Fallon, and subsequently The Tonight Show Starring Jimmy Fallon. He sometimes acts on the show, as comic foil, using deadpan facial expressions, such as in the popular recurring sketch, "Thank-You Notes". Poyser also tours with the band and regularly performs at their live shows.

== Discography ==
=== Production and songwriting ===
- Erykah Badu – "On & On", "Other Side of the Game", "Afro", "Sometimes", "Penitentiary Philosophy", "My Life", "Cleva", "Kiss Me on My Neck", "Green Eyes", "Bump It", "Back in the Day (Puff)", "I Want You", "Danger", "Love of My Life (An Ode to Hip-Hop)", "Master Teacher", "Window Seat", "Out My Mind, Just in Time"
- Mariah Carey – "I Wish You Well", "Mine Again", "When Christmas Comes"
- John Legend – "Wake Up!"
- Rihanna – "No Love Allowed"
- The Roots – "The Lesson Part III"
- Common – "*69", "Aquarius", "Between Me, You & Liberation", "Common Free Style", "Electric Wire Hustle Flower", "Ghetto Heaven Part 2", "Heaven Somewhere", "Jimi Was a Rock Star", "New Wave", "Soul Power", "The Questions", "Time Travelin"
- Anthony Hamilton – "Amen", "Corn Bread, Fish and Collard Greens", "I Tried", "Don't Get Me to Lying"
- Corinne Bailey Rae – "The Blackest Lilly"
- Bilal – "Sometimes", "Bring 2"
- D'Angelo – "Chicken Grease"
- Eric Benet – "Love of My Own", "When You Think of Me", "Spanish Fly"
- Lauryn Hill – "Superstar"
- Musiq Soulchild – "Someone", "Mother Father", "Real Love"
- Jill Scott – "Cant Explain", "Talk to Me", "Exclusively", "Try"
- Sy Smith – "Deep Sleep", "Do Things", "Bruise", "Drop That"
- Esthero – "Melancholy Melody"
- Angélique Kidjo - "Free & Equal", "Take It Or Leave It"
- Keyshia Cole – "No Other"
- Estelle – "Maybe","Wonderful Life"
- Al Green – "Lay It Down"
- Jaheim – "In My Hands"
- Ruben Studdard – "Our Story"
- Nao Yoshioka - "Make the Change (James Poyser Remix)”
- Stacy Barthe - "Angel"
- Hezekiah Walker - "Sweeter As The Days Go By", "To Be Like Jesus"
- The Rebel Yell - "Love & War" (Rapster, 2009)
- "Sessions...Vol 1" (Spotify, 2018)

=== As session musician ===
Erykah Badu

- "Mama's Gun" (Motown, 2000)
- "Worldwide Underground" (Motown, 2003)

Roy Hargrove

- "Hard Groove" (Verve, 2003)
- "Strength" EP (Verve, 2004)

The Roots

- "Things Fall Apart" (MCA, 1999)
- "The Roots Come Alive" (MCA, 1999) – 2 tracks
- "Phrenology" (MCA, 2002)

Others

- Adele, "21" (XL, 2011)
- Eric Clapton, "Clapton" (Reprise, 2010)
- Common, "Like Water for Chocolate" (MCA, 2000)
- Citizen Cope, "The Rainwater LP" (Rainwater Recordings, 2010)
- Aretha Franklin, "A Rose is Still a Rose" (Arista, 1998)
- Lauryn Hill, "The Miseducation of Lauryn Hill" (Ruffhouse, 1998)
- Elton John, "The Lockdown Sessions" (Interscope, 2021)
- Norah Jones, "The Fall" (Blue Note, 2009)
- Ziggy Marley, "Family Time" (Tuff Gong, 2009)
- Ozzy Osbourne, "Patient Number 9" (Epic, 2022)

== Film and television ==
- 2 Distant Strangers score composer
- Maxine's Baby: The Tyler Perry Story score composer
- Boxing Day score composer
- The Tonight Show Starring Jimmy Fallon house band, performer, theme and sketch music composer
- The Equalizer score co-composer (CBS)
- The 1619 Project score composer (Hulu)
- Unfinished Business score co-composer
- The Harder They Fall additional music/arrangements
- Wyatt Cenac's Problem Areas theme and sketch music composer (HBO)
- The Break with Michelle Wolf theme music composer
- Hawthorne theme music composer (TV)
- Chappelle's Show original sketch music (TV)
- Fame writer and producer of songs on soundtrack (movie)
- The Wash writer and producer of a song on soundtrack (movie)
- The Fighting Temptations writer and producer of a song on soundtrack (movie)
- Baby Boy writer and producer of song on soundtrack (movie)
- The Goods: Live Hard, Sell Hard writer and/or performer of songs on soundtrack (movie)
- Totally Awesome score composer
- Planters "The Roast of Mr. Peanut" ad composer
- Cherish the Day season 2 score composer
- Password score composer
- Gatorade "Don't Go Missing" ad composer
