= Zap Mama =

Belgian-Congolese Afro-pop musician

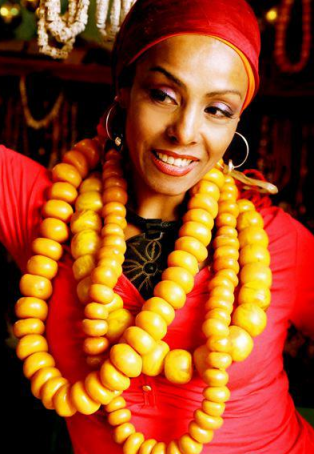
- Zap Mama visits merchant in Mali.

Background information
- Also known as: Zap Marie
- Born: Marie Daulne
- Origin: Belgium
- Genres: World music; Afro pop; Afro fusion
- Years active: 1991–present
- Labels: Crammed Discs; Luaka Bop; Heads Up International; Virgin EMI; Concord Music Group
- Members: Marie Daulne
- Past members: Tanja Daese, Lene Norgaard Christensen, Sabine Kabongo, Celine T'hooft, Sylvie Nawasadio, Anita Daulne, Ida Kristine Nielsen
- Website: zapmama.com

Zap Mama is a Belgian singer-songwriter, performer, composer, lyricist, activist, video artist and ethno-vocal therapist born in the Democratic Republic of Congo and raised in Belgium. Zap Mama sings polyphonic and afro pop music, a harmonic music with a mixture of infused African vocal techniques, urban, hip hop with emphasis on voice. In order to explore and discover the vast world of oral tradition music, she travels throughout Africa, learning, exchanging and sharing information about healing songs, lullabies, mourning, and practising polyphony with griots, Tartit tuareg women, Dogons, Peulhs, Pygmies, Mangbetus, Zulus and others.

Zap Mama's worldwide success began with a quintet of polyphonic female singers, whose unique vocal polyphony style has inspired influences in American hip hop, nu-soul, jazz and elements of pop. Her song "Iko-Iko" was featured in the film Mission: Impossible II.

"The voice is an instrument in itself," says Daulne, "it's the original instrument. It's the original instrument. The main instrument. It's the instrument that gives the most soul, the human voice. We sing songs in French and English with African and world roots."

== Early life ==
=== Democratic Republic of Congo ===
Marie Daulne was born in the city of Isiro in east Zaire (now the Democratic Republic of the Congo). Her father was a white Walloon (French-speaking Belgian); her mother was a black Congolese Bantu woman from Kisangani. When she was a few days old, her father was captured and killed by Simba rebels during the Congo Crisis. Marie's mother, with her brother and two sisters, survived by hiding in the forest. Several months later, they were airlifted by Belgian paratroopers and flown to Belgium.

=== Belgium ===
Growing up in Belgium was not easy for the family. "The afro community was very under-represented and not at all prominent at that time in Belgium," said Daulne. "It became easier as I grew older". There were black role models seen in music and sports. At home, the Congolese culture remained present through traditional songs, which her mother and sisters sang together. The paternal family of Marie's father provided liturgical music and the Walloon popular songs. From early adolescence, Marie trained and competed in track, field and volleyball, with aspirations to one day compete in the Olympics. Marie graduated from the Academie Royale des Beaux Arts de Bruxelles and the Nationale Superieure des Arts Visuales de La Cambre. Daulne also trained in modern dance, choreography and acrobatics at the Ecole du Cirque, and briefly attended the Antwerp School of Jazz.

Daulne's mother sang songs and polyphonies with Daulne and her sisters so the children benefited from a heritage of oral tradition. Daulne grew up and listened to European music. "Belgian radio stations programmed European music mainly from France, UK and American which were very popular throughout Europe. Since our mother did not want us to watch TV at home, we entertained ourselves by creating our own music. We were very musical." Daulne was introduced to black music watching television. "When I was growing up, there were only a few Afro families, and they were mostly isolated. However, we would often come together in a renowned district of Brussels known as "Matongue," around the La Maison Africane. It was there that my mother established several shops specializing in African items. Then I saw an American musical comedy called Carmen Jones with black people on TV. And I couldn't believe it. I said, "That's us!" My whole fantasy life was based on that movie." Daulne said she felt a special connection to blues songs like "Damn Your Eyes" by Etta James. "When I was a teenager I listened to a lot of American blues," she said. "That song brought me happiness while I was going through the pain of a broken love. It helped me to open the door and see the life in front of me. I sing it now and I hope, in my turn, that I can help another teenager to do the same if they are having pain from love."

When Daulne was 14 years old, she frequently visited London, England and discovered British Jamaican reggae artists. "My first vinyl was Kaya by Bob Marley. I know that whole album by heart." Then Daulne became interested in the rap music of Run-DMC and the Beastie Boys. "I was into breakdancing at the time. I formed a girl group, and we used to show off with break-dance acrobatics and beatbox influences from Doug E Fresh and Fat Boys." It was during this time that she began incorporating the polyphonic sounds of African rhythms into her music.

After Daulne left her family home, she came to realize the profound richness of the African songs that her mother had sung to her during her childhood. "In the school choir, I wondered why we didn't use African harmonizations or rhythms. So I started recording music that reflected this mix of influences from traditional African melodies, British reggae, USA beatbox, French and American funk songs, and Zap Mama was born. I wrote my first song when I was 15, and since then, I haven't stopped." However, Daulne's true professional involvement in music began after an unfortunate accident that hindered her ability to continue her athletics training. This incident forced her to redirect her energy and passion towards her musical pursuits. "I wanted to have a career in sports, but I tore my ligaments during an acrobatic breakdance performance. It marked the end of my journey in the world of sports I stayed at home, listening to music. I recorded sounds all the time and I listened to sounds that went on for hours. But I still needed something, and that's when I decided to go to Africa, to the deep Ituri forest where I was born."

=== Return to Africa ===
In the documentary film Mizike Mama, Daulne and her family talk about a backwards cultural struggle to win her allegiance as a child. Her mother, having lived through a period of Belgian colonial rule, feared that Daulne would speak with an African accent and so did not teach her the language.

Daulne first heard a recording of Pygmy ritual music from the colonial period exposed in a toy library in Brussels, and recognized the same musical ranges as her mother's songs. She returned to Congo-Kinshasa in 1984 to learn about her heritage and train in pygmy onomatopoeic vocal techniques. "When I went to the Congo, I hadn't thought of becoming the vocal artist I am today. Not at all. But I was there, to understand the family history, and I was in the middle of the forest, hearing the music that had been part of my earliest memories, and it was like an illumination, like a light," Daulne said. Daulne made further trips to Africa. "I've been all over Africa. I started where I was born, in the forest of Zaire. Then I went to West Africa, to discover the Tuareg, Mandingo music and griots, to South Africa in Soweto, to East Africa with the Masai and to North Africa with the Gnawa. "I focused mainly on vocal techniques," explains Daulne. Daulne considers herself a citizen of the world. "You know, when I went back to Congo, I thought I'd be welcomed as if I were part of the community, part of the country, but that wasn't the case," says Daulne. "They treated me like a Belgian coming to visit. I saw that no where would I find a place where I could feel at home."

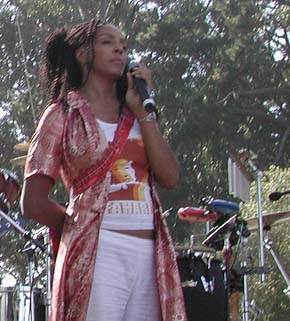
Marie Daulne, the founder and leader of Zap Mama.

Daulne's music has evolved over the years from an a cappella quintet to a lead voice accompanied by instruments. "I'm a nomad. I like to discover my sound with different instruments, different genres. For me it's normal. My name is Zap Mama...it's easy for me to zap in from one instrument to another, a culture, a style. I'm more a citizen of the world, not an American or Belgian." Zap Mama has released nine full-length albums: Zap Mama (1991) (re-released in 1993 as Adventures in Afropea 1, minus the single track Etupe), Sabsylma (1994), Seven (1997), A Ma Zone (1999), Ancestry in Progress (2004), Supermoon (2007), ReCreation (2009), Eclectic Breath (2018) and Odyssée (2022) that fall into five cycles.

=== First Cycle: Adventures in Afropea (album1) and SabSylMa (album 2) ===
Back in Belgium, Marie Daulne teaches African polyphony and polyrhythm in private music schools in Brussels. She founded the female a cappella quintet "Zap Mama" to fuse the African and European aspects of her identity Marie Daulne auditioned dozens of female singers in search of the right combination of voices for an a cappella ensemble. "When I made my first album, I was looking for girls who, like me, had grown up with a double culture", she said. "I wanted to put these two sounds together." The group evolved by meeting singers with different timbres: Marie Daulne, her sister Anita Daulne, Sylvie Nawasadio, Sabine Kabongo, Cecilia Kankonda, Céline T'hooft, and Fanchon Nuyens. This ensemble of timbres combined the sound styles of Congolese Pygmies with the vocal styles of European choral traditions. The original idea behind Zap Mama was "five singers who would be as one", said Marie Daulne. "The strength of polyphony is unity through the voice. "I wanted to show the world the capacity of five authentic, strong women, proud of their Afropean culture, exploring a futuristic African world... our voices and our spirits, nothing else."

Zap Mama performed their first concert in 1989. In 1991, the group recorded their first record, Zap Mama, at Studio Daylight in Brussels, Belgium. The album was released by Crammed Discs, the Belgian record label of Marc Hollander and Vincent Kenis (who produced the album) and Luakabop Independent Music Label. In 1992, Zap Mama came to the United States for the first time to perform at New Music Seminar in New York. There, they met David Byrne and agreed to let him reissue Zap Mama's first recordings as Adventures in Afropea 1 on Luaka Bop Records. By the end of the year, the first album stayed at the top of the Billboard charts for 11 weeks in the world music chart. Zap Mama went on tour, playing New York's Central Park, Paris' Olympia, the Montreux Jazz Festival. After the success of Adventures in Afropea 1, Zap Mama parted ways with Crammed Disc Records, remark Ftrance a tumultuous legal battle for the reason of artistic and marketing choices. According to Daulne, the record company "wanted to turn us into a French poppy girl group, but I said, 'our intention is to bring the music of forgotten people to enrich the music of tomorrow', and I end up by leaving the label. Everyone wandered why I wanted to stop when we had reached such dazzling peak. But I felt that it was completely wrong. I wasn't ready. I wasn't strong enough. The manager said that if I stopped then, I'd be killing my career, but it was my decision."

The next album SabSylMa (Crammed Discs, 1994) featured Indian, Moroccan, and Australian influences and earned Zap Mama a Grammy for Best World Music Album. She was invited to perform with the Neville Brothers, Ai Jarreau and Bobby Mcferrin. Zap Mama has toured the United States, Japan and Europe, appeared on numerous television programmes, including Sesame Street, Studio 54th, ABC TV, Arsenio Hall Show, BET, Jools Holland, Taratata, and BBC News. The group also contributed to the soundtrack of Mathieu Kassovitch's film "La Haine".

Daulne explained that the sharper sound of SabSylMa was due to the increasing influence of American music, as a result of being on the road. "We've been touring so intensively. Adventures in Afropea 1 was a soft, African record with a natural, round sound. SabSylMa is hectic, sharper. Not on purpose, mind you. I can't help it. If you're driving in a van for months, and you constantly hear the sounds of traffic, TV, hard rock on the radio ... those sounds hook up in your ears, and come out if you start to sing."

In the studio, Daulne used an organic process of improvisation to create her music. "I'm always looking for sounds. Most of the time, I work with colors. Each sound needs different colors of voices. I dissect sounds, cut them in little pieces, order them, and reassemble them," says Daulne. "During the rehearsals, we light some candles, start a tape-recorder, close our eyes, and start making up a story. On that, we start adding sounds. We let ourselves go. We are carried away by the music."

While Zap Mama worked in the studio on their 1st album "Adventure afropéenne", Director Violaine de Villers made a documentary, Mizike Mama (1990), a portrait of the group. The film focuses on Daulne as the driving force behind the group and discusses the implications of membership in a racially mixed group that consciously fuses African rhythms and vocal tones with European polyphony.

In 1995, Marie Daulne signed, co-created and performed an advert for Coca-Cola which was broadcast worldwide during the 1996 Summer Olympics in Atlanta (single: Brrlak /Take me KoKo) the women's quintet achieves worldwide fame and embarks on a world tour.

=== Second Cycle: Seven and A Ma Zone ===
After the success of her first two albums, Daulne gave birth in 1993 to her first child Kezia Quental known as K.zia. Upon returning to her music, Daulne took a new direction. She chose to record Seven as the sole remaining member of the original Zap Mama. Her music had evolved stylistically as well. Adventures in Afropea 1 and Sabsylma had both been largely a cappella, but Seven broke with the past by including male musicians and vocalists, an increased number of instruments, and more songs in English. "I'm looking for instruments that have vocal sounds, forgotten instruments like the guimbri... The first and second albums were about the voice, what came before. This album is about introducing those sounds into modern, Western life," says Daulne. The title of Seven (1997) refers to the seven senses of a human being. When Daulne traveled to Mali in 1996, she had learned the Malian belief that in addition to the five senses known in the West, some have a sixth sense of emotion. "But not everyone has the seventh. It is the power to heal with music, calm with color, to soothe the sick soul with harmony. [The man who taught me about this belief] told me that I have this gift, and I know what I have to do with it," Daulne says.

Daulne's next album was A Ma Zone (1999). The title is a wordplay meaning both "Amazone," the female warrior, and "A Ma Zone," (in my zone) which "means that I feel at ease wherever I am," Daulne says. "Naturally an Amazon is a rebel, a fighter who, once she has set her heart on something, pulls out all the stops to achieve her goal. I feel this way as well when I'm standing on the stage with the group-- as a team we share the same aim of winning over the audience with our music," Daulne says. That same year, Zap Mama made "Iko-Iko" for Mission: Impossible 2 soundtrack, a cover of "Jock-A-Mo" by Sugar Boy & the Cane Cutters.

=== Third Cycle: Ancestry in Progress and Supermoon ===
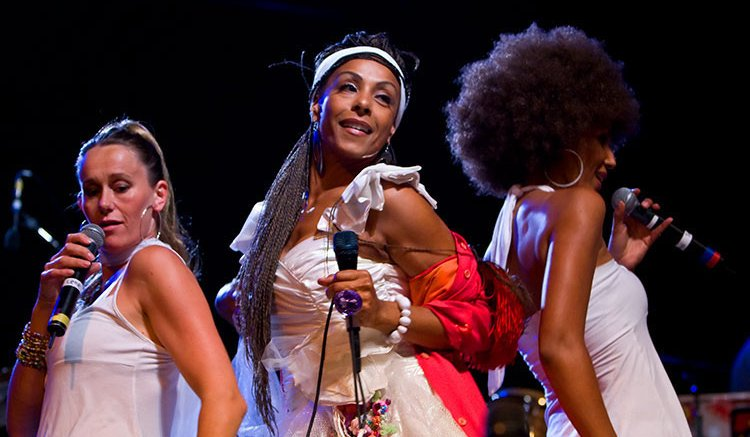
Daulne (center) performs with Zap Mama at Bumbershoot 2007 in Seattle on September 3, 2007.

Daulne moved to New York in 2000. "I've never been welcome in any country as my own country," says Daulne. "In Europe, they talk to me as if I'm from Congo. In Congo, they act like I'm from Europe. The first time I felt at home was in New York. I said, 'Here is my country. Everybody is from somewhere else. I feel so comfortable here.'"

In 2001 She gives birth to he second child Zekye Daulne ROGIERS.

Ancestry in Progress (2004) reflects Daulne's new life in the United States, as it synthesizes her traditional African and European influences with American musical styles like hip-hop and R&B. "The American beat is a revolution all over the world," Daulne says. "Everybody listens to it and everybody follows it. But the beat of the United States was inspired by the beat coming from Africa. Not just its structure, but the sound of it. This is the source of modern sounds, the history of the beat, starting from little pieces of wood banging against one another, and arriving on the big sound-systems today. It's genius. So I wanted to create an album about the evolution of old ancestral vocal sounds, how they traveled from Africa, mixing with European and Asian sounds, and were brought to America." Ancestry in Progress (2004) reached No. 1 on the Billboard World Music Album chart. A music video for the single "Bandy Bandy," featuring Erykah Badu, directed by Bill Fishman and produced by David Herrera (music video director), aired on VH1.

In Supermoon (2007), Daulne's vocals take center stage. The loss of her best friend Nina de Goeyse plunges her into a deep depression and follows by the separation from the father of her second child. This forces Daulne to live between two cities, New York and Brussels.

=== Fourth Cycle: ReCreation ===
In 2009, Zap Mama released her 7th album ReCreation, (with Terlac label CONCORD music USA), which celebrates her tradition of global influences and expresses her new attitude to her life and music. Daulne describes the inspiration behind the album as her realization that she was learning and experiencing "something new all the time." The album title refers to recreation in both senses of the word, both as self-renewal and as relaxation and pleasure. Almost all the songs on the album are collaborations with other artists, including G. Love, Vincent Cassel, and Bilal. ReCreation was nominated by the NAACP Image Awards in the Best World Music Album category.

In 2018, Zap mama released her Eighth album, Eclectic Breath a return to vocal techniques blending a cappella and beatbox Pumzi is a gathering of vocalists and human beatboxers engaged in polyphonic techniques and other catchy tunes infused with Afro, Latin and house rhythms. Zap Mama will be releasing this album without the support of a record label.

In 2019, Daulne will be honored with an Honorary Maestro of world music, Marie Daulne aka ZAP MAMA. By the jazz department of the Antwerp Conservatory of Music

=== Fifth Cycle: Odyssée and Body and Mind ===
Zap Mama returns with Odyssée, a resolutely modern album open to the world, written entirely in French and in which she defends the concept of Afropeanity. "In our country, unlike in the United States, Belgian-Congolese history is not documented: we have to go and find the unsung heroes. For the texts, Daulne was able to count on the help of her brother Jean-Louis Daulne and Salvatore Adamo. Daulne reaches an age when legacy is essential. Daulne's humanitarian commitment includes support for a living hero, Dr. Mukwegue, winner of the 2018 Nobel Prize.

In 2020 to 2021, Daulne undergoes training in Sonotherapy and Music Therapy, to bring her support to the women survivors of the Panzi hospital in Bukavu (Eastern Democratic Republic of the Congo).

In 2022 Daulne travels to Goma and Bukavu where she runs Ethno Vocal Therapy workshops, composes and records music with young women, and provides psychological support for the socio-economic reintegration of survivors treated by DR. Denis MUKWEGE. Daulne will be back after the screening of Thierry Michel's documentary on Chaine RTBF Belgique, in which she participated in the debate to testify about the strength of the eastern congoles woman in the name and honor of her mother, Nabindibo Aningi, a heroine and survivor of the massacres in the region and puts together the pieces of a complex jigsaw puzzle of successive wars involving hundreds of armed groups, some Congolese, some foreign, guilty of mass crimes whose primary victims are women. In the Congo, rape has become a weapon of war, with victims now numbering several generations. And it continues to this day. A debate moderated by Nathalie Maleux will take stock of the situation in the Democratic Republic of the Congo. It will bring together the documentary's director, Thierry Michel, experts in international law, geopolitics and human rights, Marie Daulne of Zap Mama, and Bernard Cadière, surgeon at Hôpital Saint-Pierre and Dr. Mukwege's right-hand man.

Daulne co-composed the soundtrack for "Enkai", the final episode of the Afrocentric animated anthology series Kizazi Moto: Generation Fire, alongside her daughter K.Zia.

Daulne continues her musical journey by offering a therapeutic experience through her online digital release, "DAY by DAY." This wellness music incorporates affirmations that aim to uplift and inspire listeners.

In 2024, Marie Daulne narrated lines written by Andrée Blouin in the documentary film Soundtrack to a Coup d'État, presented at the 2024 Sundance Film Festival. The film was later nominated for Best Documentary Feature at the 97th Academy Awards in 2025. At the awards ceremony, Zap Mama's red carpet appearance, where her outfit carried a political message in support of Congo, was covered by outlets such as The New York Times, BBC, Huffington Post, WBAL-TV, and Euronews.

That same year, Zap Mama celebrated the 30th anniversary of her career with two major concerts produced by Green House Talent: one at Ancienne Belgique in Brussels, and another at Roma in Antwerp. They featured special guests from the Belgian diaspora, including Selah Sue, K.Zia, Coely, and Fredy Massamba. In 2025, she will present a new concert concept titled Ancestry in Motion, a collaborative performance with her daughter K.Zia, centered on the theme of love and intergenerational connection, touring across Europe.

Marie Daulne officially made her debut as a theater actress in 2025, performing at the KVS Theatre in Brussels in the multilingual play Amour/Liefde, directed by Pitcho Konga Wamba. Sharing the stage with four other actresses, the production is based on L’amour est très surestimé (2007), a collection of short stories by Franco-Algerian author Brigitte Giraud.

== Discography ==
- Zap Mama (1991)
- Adventures in Afropea 1 (1993)
- Sabsylma (1994)
- Seven (1997)
- A Ma Zone (1999)
- Ancestry in Progress (2004)
- Supermoon (2007)
- ReCreation (2009)
- Eclectic Breath (2018)
- Odyssée (2022)

== Notable collaborations ==
- "Soundtrack to a Coup d'Etat," (2024) narration for documentary film premiering at 2024 Sundance Film Festival, directed by Johan Grimonprez
- Ng'endo Mukii "ENKAI" (2023) DISNEY+
- Laurent Perez Del Mar :"La montagne blanche"," l'arrivée au Banian"(2015)"Drifting"
- Antiballas (2015)
- Google doodle for International Women's Day (2014)
- G. Love & Special Sauce, "Drifting," ReCreation (2009)
- Vincent Cassel, "Paroles Paroles" and "Non Non Non," ReCreation (2009)
- Bilal, "Sorrow, Tears & Blood", Love for Sale (2001–03)
- Hans Zimmer, "Iko Iko" Paramount Mission impossible II (2000)
- Speech of Arrested Development, "I Wonder", The Grown Folks Table (2009); "Each Step Moves Us On," 1 Giant Leap 2 Sides 2 Everything Soundtrack (2008) and "W'happy Mama," A Ma Zone (1999)
- Alanis Morissette, "Arrival," 1 Giant Leap 2 Sides 2 Everything Soundtrack (2008)
- Michael Franti, "High Low," All Rebel Rockers (2009); "Hey Brotha," Supermoon (2007); "Listener Supporter," Stay Human (2001); "Poetry Man" and "Baba Hooker," Seven (1997)
- Sérgio Mendes, "Waters of March," Encanto (2008)
- Kery James, "Après la pluie," À l’ombre du show business (2008)
- Tony Allen, "African Diamond," ReCreation (2009) and "1000 Ways," Supermoon (2007)
- David Gilmore, "Toma Taboo," Supermoon (2007)
- Arno, "Toma Taboo," Supermoon (2007) and "Brussels Mabel," Arno (2002)
- Ladysmith Black Mambazo, "Hello to My Baby," Long Walk to Freedom (2006)
- Carl Craig, "Bandy Bandy," Luaka Bop Remixes (2005)
- Common, Talib Kweli, and ?uestlove, "Yelling Away," Soundbombing III (2002)/Ancestry in Progress (2004)
- Questlove, Bahamadia, and Lady Alma, "Show Me the Way," Ancestry in Progress (2004)
- Scratch, "Wadidyusay?," Ancestry in Progress (2004)
- Erykah Badu, "Bandy Bandy," Ancestry in Progress (2004) and "Bump It," Worldwide Underground (2003)
- Common, "Ferris Wheel," Electric Circus (2002)
- DJ Krush, "Danger of Love," Zen (2001)
- Black Thought, "Rafiki," A Ma Zone (1999)
- The Roots, "Act Won (Things Fall Apart)," Things Fall Apart (1999)
- Boyd Jarvis, "Alibokolijah," Alibokolijah (1999)
- Maria Bethânia, "Glytzy," Ambar (1997)
- King Britt, "Poetry Man," Seven (1997)
- U-Roy, "New World," Seven (1997)
- Dana Bryant, "Food," Wishing from the Top (1996)
- Al Jarreau "I Shall Be Released" (1994) TARATA
- Jacques Hugelin "Le Grand REX" (1993)

== Music in film, television, and video games ==
- Kizazi Moto (ENKAI) Disney + (2023 ) animated film
- Badasss (Coucou) Mario Van Peebles' half-documentary
- Metisse/Cafe au Lait ("Take Me Coco")
- Harsenio hall show (PLEKETE)
- So You Think You Can Dance Australia TV (Brrlak)
- Belpop classic CANVAS VRT documentary
- Pourquoi j'ai pas mangé mon père PATHE Jamel Debouz animated film)
- EA Sports' FIFA 10 ("Vibrations")
- So You Think You Can Dance ("Take Me Coco," "Moonray" and "W'happy Mama")
- Cashmere Mafia ("1000 Ways")
- Brothers & Sisters ("Supermoon")
- MTV's Road Rules ("Rafiki")
- MTV's 9th Annual Music Awards ("Iko Iko")
- Sesame Street ("Brrrlak")
- The Man ("Bandy Bandy")
- The God Who Wasn't There ("A Way Cuddy Dis")
- In the Cut ("Allo Allo")
- Tortilla Soup ("Call Waiting")
- Mission: Impossible 2 ("Iko Iko")
- La Haine ("J'attends," "Discussion," and "Songe")
- Elle Magazine commercial ("Sweet Melodie")
- Mercedes-Benz commercial ("Din Din")
- Nokia 7250 commercial ("Take Me Coco")
- BMW commercial ("Danger of Love")
- Fiat commercial ("Allo Allo")
- Where in the World Is Carmen Sandiego? ("Brrrlak")
