= Nathalie Maleux =

Belgian television journalist

Nathalie Maleux (born 4 July 1973 in Waremme) is a Belgian television presenter and journalist. Since April 2007, she has served as head presenter for La Une.
