= Anthony Tidd =

African American musician

Anthony Tidd is a British-born bass player, composer, music producer, curator and Guggenheim Fellow who has been based in the United States since 1999. A well-known name on the international jazz scene and veteran touring bass player, he has graced stages alongside many staple names, including Steve Coleman, The Roots, Rudresh Mahanthappa, Wayne Krantz, Meshell Ndegeocello, Common, and Jill Scott. Currently, Tidd regularly tours and records with alto saxophonist Steve Coleman, is the Creative Music Program Director at the Kimmel Center for the Performing Arts in Philadelphia. and is the owner of recording/production studio Tidbit Sonos.

== Early life ==
Anthony Tidd was born in London, England to Trinidadian immigrants. At the age of 5 he enrolled at London's prestigious Newham Academy of Music and began studying classical violin. Tidd said "There, I got a whole classical background, playing in orchestras and learning how to read music, and they also taught me music theory." Tidd went on to learn how to play the electric bass. He was enrolled at Newham Academy of Music until age 16 and then he moved on to Thurrock College, followed by Goldsmiths University.

== Music career ==
Tidd's professional music career began as a teenager with the group Quite Sane in the 90s. The group was formed with guitarist Eric Appapoulay and drummer Richard Cassell. Tidd said of the group, "We started out playing James Brown covers and stuff that was popular at the time, like Michael Jackson, and it wasn't long before we arrived at fusion music like Chick Corea and the Yellowjackets". The group went on to record the critically acclaimed album The Child of Troubled Times.

During that same time period of the late 1990s Tidd was introduced to the music of saxophonist Steve Coleman by another Quite Sane band member. Shortly thereafter the manager of the then unsigned band The Roots, Richard Nichols, and Steve Coleman made a trip to London to hear Tidd play. Coleman's frequent collaborator Greg Osby had recommended the young British bassist so highly that the saxophonist flew across the Atlantic to hear for himself. As Tidd recalls, "He put on a cassette — that's how long ago this was — and I said, 'This is amazing. Who programmed the drums?' He said, 'That's a live drummer, a guy called Ahmir Thompson'".

Tidd went on to live with The Roots while they spent some time in London with the help of Richard Nichols. In 1996 with the help of resources from Nichols and Coleman Tidd moved to the U.S. and formed the production team Noize Trip with Melvin "Chaos" Lewis. Through his work as a producer and musician Tidd has worked with well-known names such as Common, Jill Scott, The Black Eyed Peas and Macy Grey. He continues to work regularly with members of The Roots on various projects.

In 2010 Anthony Tidd began working for the Kimmel Center for the Performing Arts in Philadelphia as the Creative Music Program Director. Tidd has grown the program from the ground up creating content and educating students in a variety of areas including theory, harmony, rhythm skills, ear training, improvisation, sight reading and jazz history. In addition to his role as the Creative Music Program Director Tidd is the curator of a free monthly jam session at the Kimmel Center called "Sittin In." Tidd's arrival in the states was during the height of the Black Lily era and his position at the Kimmel has created a great opportunity to revive the essence of a live jam session and showcase the talented artist and musicians in Philadelphia and the surrounding area. Tidd has said, "If I could sum up my mission, it's to bring the public at large back into the fold of appreciating creative music".

Currently, Tidd continues to work with Steve Coleman recording albums and touring domestically and internationally with several of Steve Coleman's ensembles.

== Other work ==
Tidd has composed music for the United Nations, the BBC, American Airlines, the London Philharmonic Orchestra, as well as film & television. In 2016 he was chosen for the Jazz Composers Orchestra Institute in which he wrote an orchestral piece for the Buffalo Philaharmonic Orchestra.
