= The Way I See It =

Studio album by Raphael Saadiq
- Released: September 16, 2008
- Recorded: 2008
- Studio: Blakeslee Recording Company (Los Angeles); Harmonie Park (Detroit); The Music Shed (New Orleans)
- Genre: Soul
- Length: 42:07
- Label: Columbia
- Producer: Raphael Saadiq

Raphael Saadiq chronology
Ray Ray (2004)	The Way I See It (2008)	Stone Rollin' (2011)

Singles from The Way I See It
- 1. "Love That Girl" Released: August 5, 2008; 2. "100 Yard Dash" Released: March 30, 2009; 3. "Never Give You Up" Released: May 27, 2009; 4. "Let's Take a Walk" Released: August 7, 2009; 5. "Staying in Love" Released: October 5, 2009

The Way I See It is the third album by the American R&B singer, songwriter, and producer Raphael Saadiq. It was released on September 16, 2008, by Columbia Records – his first for the label. Prior to signing with Columbia, Saadiq had independently released his 2004 album Ray Ray, recorded with the songwriting and production duo Jake and the Phatman. He developed a creative partnership with their colleague, audio engineer Charles Brungardt, who shared Saadiq's fascination with historic recording techniques and equipment. In 2008, the singer returned from a vacation that had inspired him to pursue classic soul music and recorded The Way I See It primarily at his North Hollywood studio with Brungardt.

Saadiq and Brungardt disregarded their previous experience in recording production while making The Way I See It. Instead, they experimented with older recording techniques in an attempt to recreate the Motown music aesthetic of the 1960s, producing a traditional soul album that emphasizes upbeat hooks and draws on the Motown Sound and Philadelphia soul styles. Saadiq, whose lyrics mostly deal with romantic subject matter, described it as a series of love songs about music and remaining faithful to it despite trends. The album's title reflects his singular vision for the music, while the packaging is fashioned after the musical eras that inspired Saadiq, evoking dramatic and colorful LP covers by artists such as the Temptations and Ray Charles.

Initially overlooked by consumers, The Way I See It charted steadily on the Billboard 200 and became a sleeper hit, selling 282,000 copies in the United States by 2011. It also performed well in European countries such as France, where it charted for 51 weeks. The album received mostly positive reviews from critics and was nominated for the 2009 Grammy Award for Best R&B Album. An exemplary release of the classic soul revival at the time, it garnered Saadiq a newer, more diverse audience as he toured extensively in support of the album, performing concerts in the US, Europe, and Asia.

== Background ==
After independently releasing his second studio album Ray Ray in 2004, Raphael Saadiq continued working as a producer, composer, and instrumentalist on other recording artists' music. He was introduced to audio engineer Charles Brungardt through production and songwriting team Jake and the Phatman, who had worked on Ray Ray. Brungardt interned at Blakeslee Recording Company, Saadiq's North Hollywood recording studio, and eventually became his principal sonic partner on projects. The two shared a fascination with historic recording techniques and equipment. They also studied the 2006 book Recording the Beatles together and had an interest in the knowledge of recording gear by engineers and technicians for the English rock band the Beatles. Brungardt increased his engineering output, and in 2007, Saadiq enlisted him to engineer and mix English singer Joss Stone's studio album Introducing Joss Stone, which Saadiq produced.

While vacationing in the Bahamas and Costa Rica in 2008, Saadiq observed people there listening to classic soul music and was inspired to pursue it as a musical direction for his next album. He recounted the experience in an interview for Blues & Soul, saying that "I was like 'Wow, maybe I should tap into this vibe, because it's actually what I LOVE!' ... I realised that, though you can hear it in many of the records I've done throughout my career, I'd never paid 100% attention to going in that direction before. So the difference this time is that I took a more focused route." As a part of Tony! Toni! Toné! during the late 1980s and 1990s, Saadiq had incorporated influences from the music of Motown in his songwriting for the group. Before recording The Way I See It, Saadiq signed to Columbia Records. Label executive Rick Rubin visited Saadiq's home studio and was impressed by his material there. He said of Rubin's visit and advice to him as a solo artist, "He told me to never box myself in. I just have to be myself. You've got to follow your own path. I've always gone down the road less traveled, but now I do it even more aggressively."

== Recording and production ==
After returning from his vacation, Saadiq started writing and recording The Way I See It, which took four months. In an interview for Sound on Sound, he discussed his comfort level when returning to Blakeslee Recording Company: "The music for this album flowed organically, naturally, and since I have my own studio I was able to perfect it and take my time to make it right. I was able to live with it day after day, and I think that had a lot to do with how the album turned out." He wrote the songs extemporaneously, often by playing guitar and improvising riffs. He subsequently sung them while playing each instrument one at a time, including guitar, bass, and basic piano parts that he planned to include on the recordings. He attributed this secluded approach to "the state of the industry" and idealized "bounc[ing] ideas off other people, do some writing with them, take the material to my band and say, 'OK, let's cut it,' with the orchestra already there. That's my dream. I'd crank records out weekly if I had staff writers like they did at Stax and Motown".

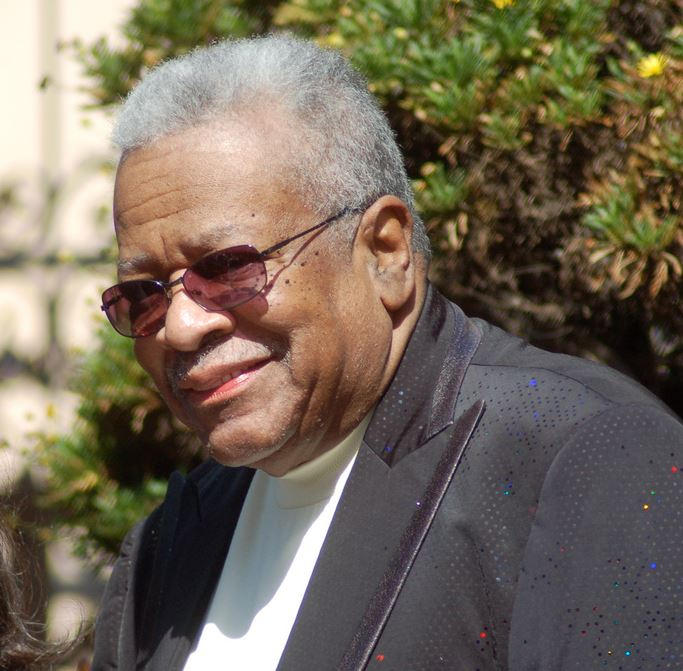
Jack Ashford (pictured in 2013), of Motown's Funk Brothers band, played percussion for several songs.

Saadiq recorded mostly at Blakeslee Recording Company; additional sessions took place at Harmonie Park Studios in Detroit and the Music Shed Studios in New Orleans. While recording, he immersed himself in a composite character of classic soul singers from videos he watched, including Al Green, Gladys Knight & the Pips, the Four Tops, and the Temptations. He recorded his vocals with only Brungardt present in the studio, a preference he felt prevented him from "looking for answers from somebody who may not really know". Saadiq said he tended to "record complete takes, and if something isn't quite right but it's got a feel that I know I can never ever capture again, I'll leave it, even if it's flat. I mean, there are flat parts on my record, because it's not about perfection, it's about the soul." He recorded background vocals for all songs. Saadiq played most of the instruments, including drums, guitar, piano, sitar, and bass guitar, his instrument of choice throughout his career. He viewed the bass playing of James Jamerson as an integral part of Motown recordings, citing it as the inspiration for his own bass sound on the album.

Saadiq worked with other musicians, including Joss Stone, percussionist Jack Ashford, string arranger Paul Riser, multi-instrumentalist Bobby Ozuna, singer CJ Hilton, and recording artist Stevie Wonder. Ashford and Riser were members of the Funk Brothers, a group of session musicians for Motown Records during the 1960s. Ashford played tambourine, vibraphone, bells, and shakers on songs such as "100 Yard Dash", "Love That Girl", and "Staying in Love". Ozuna, one-half of Jake and the Phatman, co-produced and co-wrote three songs and played several instruments, including bongos, tambourine, and drums. Hilton co-wrote "Never Give You Up" and played its drum and keyboard parts. Wonder's contribution of a harmonica solo on the song was impromptu, as Saadiq reached out to Wonder after recording the song's vocal parts with the improvised line, "I'd like to invite Mr. Stevie Wonder to my album. Come on, Stevie!" After having the idea recommended to him by rapper Q-Tip, Saadiq also reached out to Jay-Z to record a featured rap for a remix of "Oh Girl"; it was included on the album as a bonus track.

=== Sound engineering ===
The Way I See It was engineered by Saadiq, Gerry Brown, James Tanksley, and Brungardt, who mixed the album with Saadiq. Saadiq and Brungardt both liked to layer multiple instruments and, prior to recording, had contemplated techniques such as sampling and drum programming. However, they ultimately found live instrumentalists more dynamic and challenged themselves to reproduce older music productions and the Motown aesthetic of the 1960s. To familiarize themselves with vintage recording techniques, they studied Mark Lewisohn's 1988 book The Complete Beatles Recording Sessions, books about Motown Records, and images of the label's studio personnel, setup of instruments, and microphone placement. They also studied Motown EQs to achieve a tone they found adequate for songs' rhythm guitar parts. Saadiq said that he had to disregard "about 85 to 90 percent of the new techniques ... People used to take recording very seriously. They used to wear lab coats at Abbey Road. So I got serious with what I was trying to do, both mentally and physically." Brungardt said in an interview for Mix that he abandoned the approach learned on previous records he had engineered, where "they wanted it clean with no distortion. I was taught to make sure it was polish, polish, polish, and to make sure everything fits right, the bass hits and things are clean for the big pop vocal."

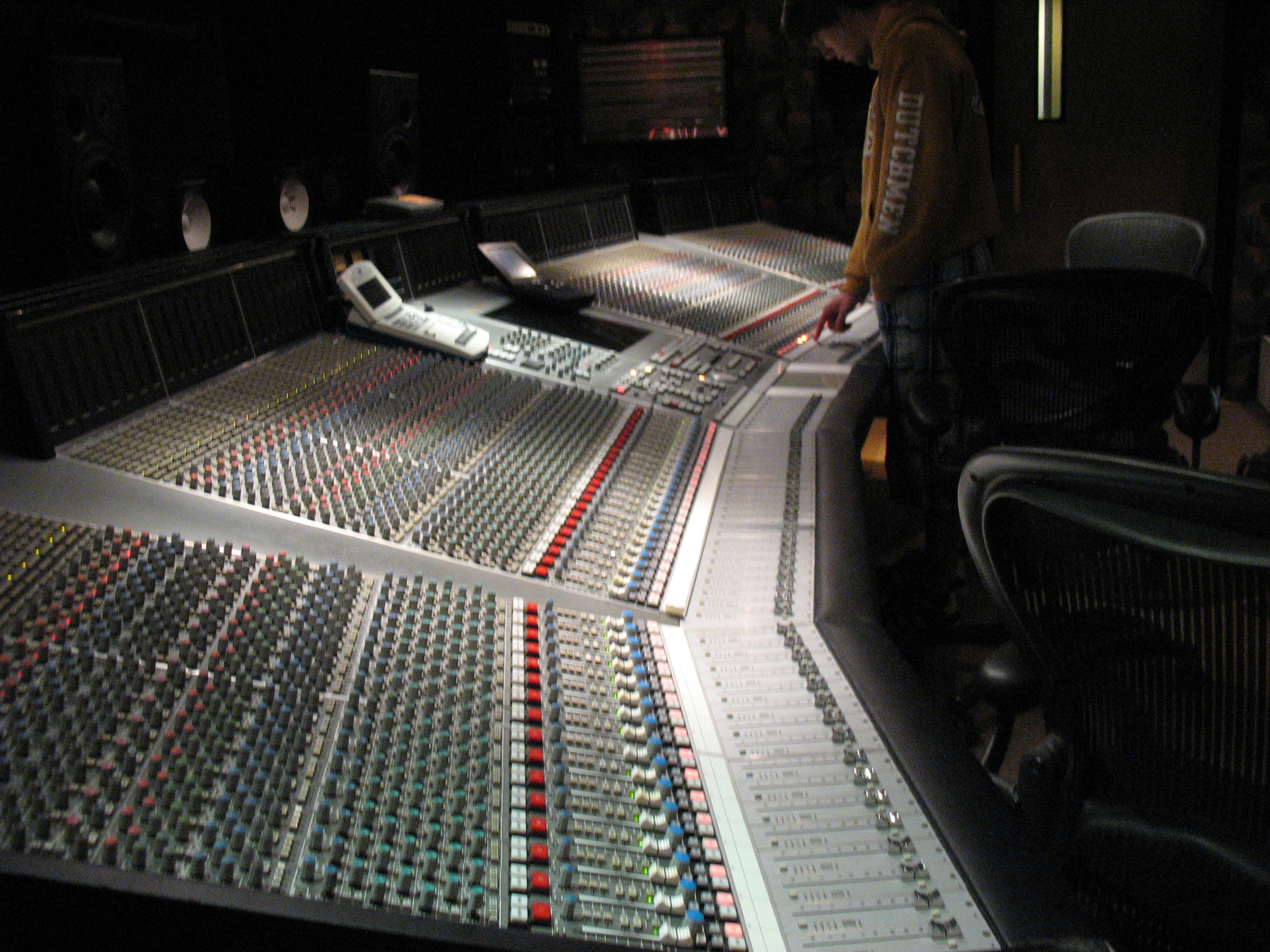
Saadiq's recording studio featured an SSL 9000 mixing console (pictured).

Saadiq's studio integrated modern equipment such as a Pro Tools digital workstation and an SSL 9000 mixing console, and featured various vintage gear, including Saadiq's 1960s Ludwig drum kit and a kick-drum mic purchased from Abbey Road Studios. In the studio, Saadiq and Brungardt experimented with techniques and equipment. They wanted the songs to have slower attacks like older recordings, as producers in the past did not have advanced compressors, audio tools that manipulate the dynamic content of signals and affect certain sounds in a recording's mix. Their production applied tube preamps and tube compressors, with the former used as a front end for Pro Tools.

To record vocals for the album, Saadiq used a Shure SM7 dynamic microphone to thicken and distort his voice and embellish his characteristically clean delivery, while Brungardt employed a compressor and a Pro Tools plug-in during the mix. Saadiq sought a certain "edge" for his vocals and an unpolished sonic element for the album. They also tried to record tracks onto cassette tapes in order to produce a grittier, older sound. Brungardt used a FilterBank plug-in when mixing the album to uncompress vocals and roll off high-end sound from tracks.

It became almost like a bet with some of the guys who were saying, 'You can't really re-create this old-sounding stuff because the power-flow back then was different, or the way this worked or that worked was different.' So Raphael and I just locked ourselves in the studio and tried everything.

— Charles Brungart (2011)

Although they wanted to reproduce an older sound, Saadiq and Brunghardt also wanted to capture more of the bass and drum parts to add a louder, modern element to the mix. They applied a more basic approach to miking the instruments and utilizing the outboard gear, using a Neumann U47 for guitars, alternating overhead microphones for Saadiq's drum kit, a combination of dynamic and condenser mics for the kit's bass drum, and Ampex tape machines for extra warmth to the kit. Brungardt used various standard mics for the snare drum to achieve a more solid cracking sound, rather than capturing the drum's overall tone. Their miking of the guitars' amps was adapted from The Complete Beatles Recording Sessions, and as Brungardt recounted, "It really gave us warmth and character. It allowed the amp to breathe and we got the tones of the amp along with the room. For me, that really opened things up so that I could play with the live room, using different reverbs to get a sound." For Saadiq's bass, they used a DI unit to connect a microphone preamplifier, increased the gain on a plug-in for less compression, and adjusted the low-end tones with an equalizer plug-in.

== Music and lyrics ==
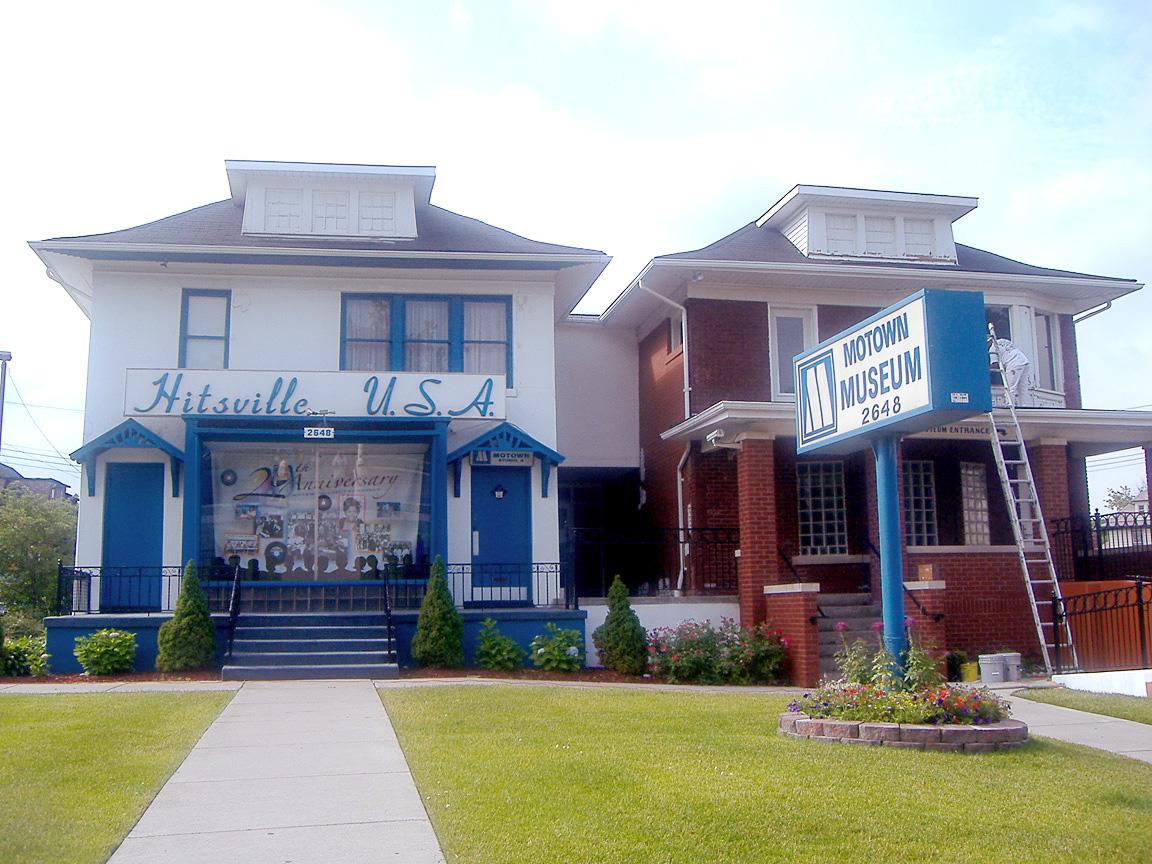
The Way I See It draws on the music of 1960s Motown (former headquarters pictured).

The Way I See It has a traditional soul style fashioned after the 1960s Motown Sound and Philadelphia soul. It is a departure from Saadiq's previous work with neo soul, which bears a hip hop influence. J. Gabriel Boylan of The New York Observer said that Saadiq expands further beyond his work as a producer for other recording artists, for whom he encouraged a "classic aesthetic, heavy on organic sounds and light on studio magic, deeply indebted to the past and distrustful of easy formulas". BBC Music's Chris Jones interpreted Saadiq's use of 1960s soul as the album's source material to be a reflection of "America's most recent great political and cultural shift ... the first true post-Obama expression of hope in record form." Saadiq viewed his rootsy direction as a response to the state of popular music and found it analogous to modern politics: "You force so many terrible things on people, they get tired of it. We have a black president now."

The album's songs draw on Motown's grooves, driving rhythms, tight drumming, tambourines in the rhythm section, guitar melodies, layered vocal arrangements, and two- to four-minute durations. They also feature bright melodies, swinging bass, sweeping strings, and snare drums that emit reverb. Cameron Carrus of The Lawrentian said that the most hook-oriented riffs are played on the bass and guitar, which blend "the low with the high", and cited "Keep Marchin'", "Love That Girl", and "Staying in Love" as examples. Jon Pareles of The New York Times viewed that Saadiq follows the example of 1960s Motown artists such as Marvin Gaye, Smokey Robinson, Stevie Wonder, and Holland–Dozier–Holland, the label's songwriting and production team. Robert Christgau wrote that the album shares Holland–Dozier–Holland's "bright, swift, clearly hooked aesthetic". Saadiq sings in a tenor voice, which is slightly distorted as a result of the album's post-production.

Saadiq's songwriting is characterized by straightforward romanticism, positive exhortations, pining ballads, and message songs. Christgau interpreted Saadiq's persona on the album to be "a romantic who stays true to the deliberate simplicity" of the song titles, but "never threatens to assume the fetal position if he doesn't get the extreme cuddling he craves." Patrick Varine of the Observer-Dispatch asserted that Saadiq deviates significantly from contemporary R&B lyrics: "there are no thinly-veiled food-sex metaphors or pimp fantasies". His songwriting also paraphrases classic soul lyrics and, on the album's slower songs, expresses tightly coiled emotions. Saadiq said that some songs were written about his life experiences. He described the album as "basically a series of love songs about music, how falling in love can be easy, but staying true to it can be tricky." He elaborated on this interpretation in an interview for the Chicago Tribune: "You have to watch out for those curves. Trendy music comes out, and how do you stay true to what you love? I'm not saying everything has to sound like a '60s record to stay true, but you should never take the relationship lightly."

=== Songs ===
The opening track, "Sure Hope You Mean It", features slightly off-beat percussion, tambourine shakes, and lyrics about a man who awaits a sign of approval from the woman he admires. "Keep Marchin'", which evoked socially conscious and positive sentiments, was composed in the vein of the Civil rights movement era soul music by artists such as Sam Cooke and the Staple Singers. Gail Mitchell from Billboard compared the song to Curtis Mayfield and the Impressions' 1968 song "We're a Winner". Saadiq said "Keep Marchin'" was also inspired by his journey in the music industry.

"Big Easy"
"Big Easy"'s tragic theme of losing a lover to Hurricane Katrina is juxtaposed with upbeat music, which Saadiq felt would evoke the spirit of New Orleans' jazz funerals.

"Big Easy", featuring New Orleans-style brass playing, was sung from the point of view of a man in New Orleans who reacts to Hurricane Katrina and looks for his lost lover. J. Gabriel Boylan of The New York Observer remarked that the song "manages to cast Hurricane Katrina as the villain in a romance, tearing lovers apart." Its composition—mixing a blissful sound with disheartening lyrics—is similar to the songwriting technique used by Holland–Dozier–Holland. Saadiq was inspired to write "Big Easy" after watching the 2006 documentary film When the Levees Broke. He explained its upbeat composition in an interview for All Things Considered: "In New Orleans, when they mourn, they really celebrate and have a great time. I wanted to give it that same spirit."

"Sometimes"
"Sometimes", a tribute to both Saadiq's mother and his own perseverance, incorporates a contemporary musical element—pulsating digital sounds—in its lush string arrangements.

According to Saadiq, "Just One Kiss" can be interpreted as a song devoted to a female love interest, "but I'm really talking about music and what it did for me. That one guitar line, that certain drum beat, how it turned my life into a ball of gold." The song incorporates cinematic strings, xylophone, and a rolling crescendo. The ballad "Calling", featuring Mexican balladeer Rocio Mendoza, draws on Motown's late 1950s R&B roots and doo-wop music, and incorporates Latin style guitar, and Spanish language lyrics. "Staying in Love", an uptempo rhythm and blues song, was written by Saadiq after he thought of an ex-girlfriend. Incongruous with its 1960s-inspired sound, "Let's Take a Walk" has sexually forward lyrics and come-ons, which the narrator uses to bluntly proposition his love interest. The midtempo "Never Give You Up" is fashioned in Motown's early 1970 sound and, unlike other songs on the album, also incorporates elements from more modern soul music.

"Sometimes" was inspired by Saadiq's upbringing in a tough neighborhood in Oakland, and is about dealing with the fatigue of universal hardships when they are worsened by the burden of racism. The line "now I know what they meant by 'Keep Your Head to the Sky'" makes reference to Earth, Wind & Fire, whose music Saadiq immersed himself in while growing up. Saadiq said of the song's message, "That's just giving dap to my moms and grandmother and the people who raised me in the neighborhood to let them know its easy but not as easy as it seems all the time and sometimes we have to back up and cry but I'm just giving thanks to the people that helped me along the way."

== Title and packaging ==
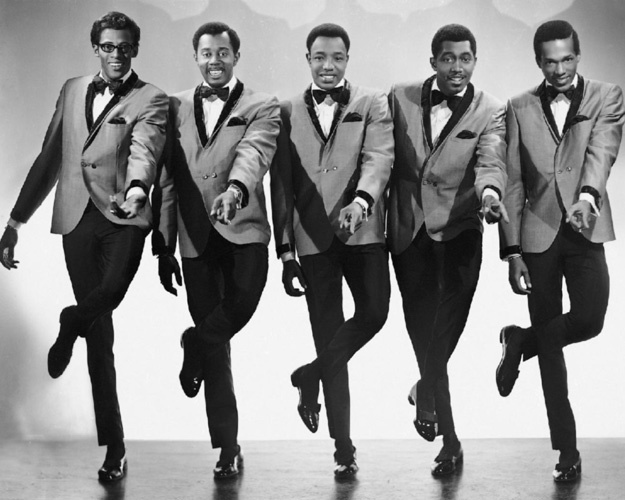
According to PopMatters, the cover shows Saadiq dressed as "a veritable one-man Temptations" (the group pictured above, in 1968), "mirroring the lithe physique and bespectacled eyes of David Ruffin" (far left).

Saadiq titled The Way I See It as a declaration to listeners about how his perspective was more informed by classic soul than before in his career. "This is what I really love", he later explained. "And everything you've heard from me before has been based on the roots of this music."

The cover photo was taken at a show in 2006 at Sweet's Ballroom in Oakland, in which Saadiq performed Marvin Gaye's 1965 song "Ain't That Peculiar". It showed Saadiq singing into a microphone with his arms raised and wearing a suit, tie, and thick-rimmed glasses: a look similar to that of Temptations singer David Ruffin. According to Saadiq, the photo "set the tone for the whole album ... me singing that song, me wearing that suit, it said everything that this album should be." Music journalist Greg Kot believed the cover "evokes the dramatic portraits and color schemes of old-school jazz and soul albums. Think Ray Charles on Atlantic, Sonny Rollins on Blue Note, Sam and Dave on Stax ... With arms raised, he looks like he's testifying as much as singing." The rest of the album's packaging also adheres to a retro aesthetic with its crimson-tinted cover's font and 1960s Columbia Records logo. The packaging's photography was taken by Norman Seeff.

== Marketing and sales ==
Before completing The Way I See It, Saadiq previewed its songs in May 2008 to music industry associates and journalists at the Sony Club in New York City. He also planned a grassroots marketing strategy for the record, which evolved from his difficulty with Columbia executives to promote the album and their idea of issuing its songs as vinyl records. He felt that "nobody at the label knew" him in an interview with The Dallas Morning News: "They had this record that I turned in that sounded like a '60s record. 'What the hell do we do with this record?' It was quality. There was not a lot of marketing and promotion, but they knew I had the credibility so you don't just throw it in the garbage ... I don't mind being a slow burn because that's actually a better road to take. I have to go in one more time and prove myself again because I am starting over again."

In September 2008, Columbia released the album both on CD and as a collector's edition box set with 7-inch vinyl singles. In the United Kingdom, it was issued with two bonus tracks—a "Euro version" of "Big Easy" and the song "Come On Home". In the week leading up to the album's release, Saadiq made promotional appearances at V-103's For Sisters Only, the International Soul Music Summit, and the Uptown Restaurant & Lounge in Atlanta. He also performed songs from the album on VH1 Soulstage.

The Way I See It was largely overlooked by consumers at first. The album debuted at number 19 on the US Billboard 200 chart, selling 23,000 copies in the week of October 4. Nonetheless, it was Saadiq's highest-charting album in the United States at the time and eventually became a sleeper hit, steadily selling 76,000 copies by November. Five singles were released from the album—"Love That Girl" on August 5, 2008, "100 Yard Dash" on March 30, 2009, "Never Give You Up" on May 27, "Let's Take a Walk" on August 7, and "Staying in Love" on October 5. "Love That Girl", "Never Give You Up", and "Staying in Love" all charted on the US Hot R&B/Hip-Hop Songs, peaking at number 45, number 26, and number 74, respectively.

During 2009, Saadiq travelled for promotional television appearances and press in Europe, where The Way I See It had charted in several countries. In France, the record spent 51 weeks on the country's albums chart, peaking at number 13 in the week of February 24. In August, it re-entered the American chart at number 101 and had sold 215,000 copies. The album charted for 41 weeks on the Billboard 200, serving as the longest chart-run of Saadiq's career. By May 2011, it had sold 282,000 copies, according to Nielsen SoundScan.

== Critical reception ==
The Way I See It ratings
Aggregate scores
Source	Rating
AnyDecentMusic?	7.2/10
Metacritic	79/100
Review scores
Source	Rating
AllMusic	4/5 stars
Blender	4/5 stars
Entertainment Weekly	A
The Guardian	4/5 stars
The Independent	5/5 stars
MSN Music (Consumer Guide)	A
Pitchfork	6.8/10
Q	3/5 stars
Rolling Stone	4/5 stars
Uncut	4/5 stars

The Way I See It was met with generally positive reviews. At Metacritic, which assigns a normalized rating out of 100 to reviews from professional publications, the album received an average score of 79, based on 20 reviews. Aggregator AnyDecentMusic? gave it 7.2 out of 10, based on their assessment of the critical consensus.

Reviewing the album for The Guardian in April 2009, Caroline Sullivan found it flawlessly produced and performed by Saadiq, while Rolling Stone magazine's Will Hermes said the record showcased an original take on classic Northern soul. Andy Gill of The Independent wrote that it was one of 2008's most captivating albums because "few have managed to retro-fabricate that classic sound so accurately, nor in as many subtle variations" like Saadiq. AllMusic's Andy Kellman stated, "Here's where a modern master, backed by living and breathing session musicians ... masters the masters with startling accuracy." In The Observer, Kitty Empire called the album "both feather-light and substantial" because of how, "unlike most modern records, Saadiq's tunes gather weight the deeper in you go". Writing for MSN Music, Christgau said Saadiq sang with Smokey Robinson's detailed sentimentality and Dennis Edwards' amenable personality. He expanded on his praise in Slate, finding that, while "painstakingly retro", Saadiq's achievement "isn't replicating the Motown Sound but writing consistently charming and catchy songs in that style". Q was more critical, finding the record devoid of a "fresh approach" to elevate it from a simple homage. According to PopMatters writer Christian John Wikane, "one's total enjoyment of the album depends on their appreciation of classic soul and R&B and whether such appreciation is contingent on absolute authenticity."

At the end of 2008, The Way I See It was included in a number of critics' best albums lists. It was named one of the year's 10-best records by the Los Angeles Times, The Wall Street Journal, and the Houston Chronicle, which cited it as ninth best. It was also ranked at number five by Exclaim!, number seven by The Irish Times, number one by NPR, number five by The Observer, number three by Time Out, and number two by USA Today. The Way I See It was voted the 18th best album of 2008 in the Pazz & Jop, an annual poll of American critics nationwide, published in The Village Voice; the poll's singles list had six of the album's songs voted in, including "100 Yard Dash" at number 114 and both "Love That Girl" and "Big Easy" at number 250. Nate Chinen of The New York Times included "100 Yard Dash" in his top-five singles list for 2008. The Way I See It also nominated for the 2009 Grammy Award for Best R&B Album. "Love That Girl" was nominated for Best Traditional R&B Vocal Performance, while "Never Give You Up" was nominated for Best R&B Performance by a Duo or Group with Vocals.

== Touring ==
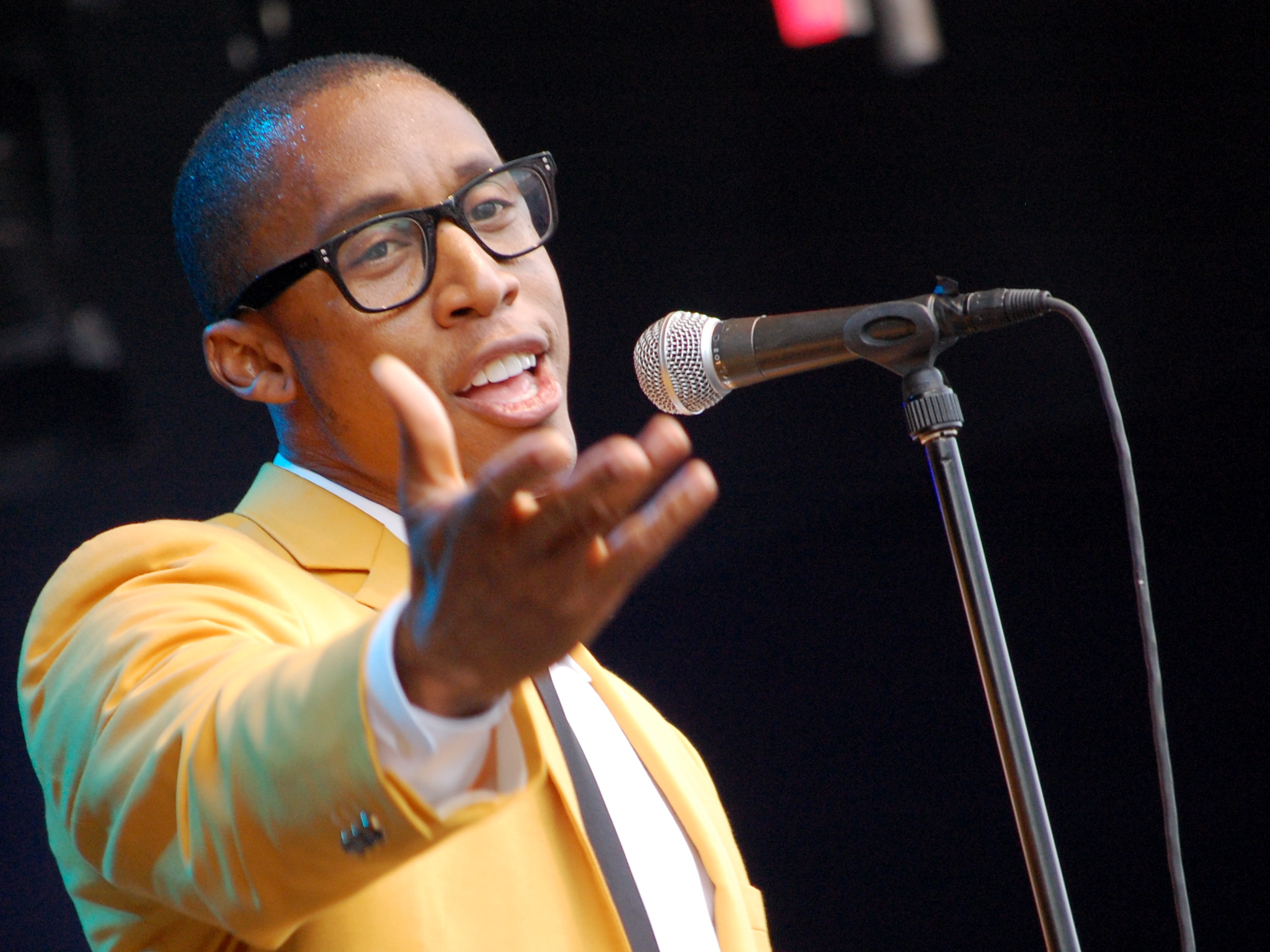
Saadiq performing at the 2009 Stockholm Jazz Festival

Saadiq toured for about two years to promote The Way I See It, performing in venues throughout the United States, Europe, and Asia. He was originally apprehensive at the prospect of touring extensively, having toured minimally as a solo act, but reconsidered at the advice of his rhythm guitarist Rob Bacon. "The money was just OK, so I was like, 'I don't know – I could probably stay home and find something better,'" Saadiq recounts to the Los Angeles Times. "But then Rob reminded me, 'You know, all those cats you love, that's exactly what they did. Little Richard? He played 10 shows a day at the Apollo.' I said, 'OK, let's go.'" To complement his songs' style, Saadiq adopted a vintage soul image and, having studied footage of classic soul groups and album sleeves, donned old-fashioned attire and performed R&B dance moves at shows. He wore a yellow tailored suit, while his nine-piece backing band wore black suits. The band included a horn section and backup singer Erika Jerry.

Before the album's release, Saadiq had toured Europe during the summer in 2008. In November and December, he served as a supporting act for John Legend. He also opened for Seal and the Dave Matthews Band. Throughout his touring in the US and Europe, Saadiq played various music festivals, including Austin City Limits, Bonnaroo, Lollapalooza, South by Southwest, Voodoo Experience, Bumbershoot, Outside Lands, and Pori Jazz. In February 2009, he performed at the Harvard Club of Boston as part of the music television series Live from the Artists Den. On June 25, he played the Blue Note Tokyo in Japan. His performance at the Bataclan in Paris on July 11 was filmed and released as a DVD, entitled Live in Paris, in 2010.

After a stretch of summer festival performances in 2009, Saadiq embarked on another leg of concerts during November and December, with Melanie Fiona, Janelle Monáe, and Anjulie as supporting acts. The tour featured dates in North America, but Saadiq also performed at the Paradiso in Amsterdam on November 13. He continued touring for the album into 2010, including performances at the JazzReggae Festival in May, the Essence Music Festival in July, and a headlining performance at Central Park SummerStage in August.

== Legacy ==
I just wanted to get a record out there that I thought would match the world – every type of person, people all over the world from the States to Europe to Russia to everywhere. I felt like that style of music works all over the world, and I wanted to make a contribution in '08 and '09 and '10 and create something that would take me around the world.

— Raphael Saadiq (2008)

The Way I See It was an exemplary release of the classic soul revival during its peak in 2008. The music scene was marked by similarly retro-minded work from mainstream artists such as Amy Winehouse and Adele, independent acts such as Sharon Jones & the Dap-Kings and Mayer Hawthorne, and older artists attempting comebacks such as Al Green and Bettye LaVette. Oliver Wang cited Saadiq's album, along with Solange Knowles' 2008 record Sol-Angel and the Hadley St. Dreams, as one of the "retro-soul" efforts that were released by contemporary R&B artists as the music scene peaked in popularity. Wang wrote that The Way I See It "showcased a mastery of any number of past R&B styles, including those out of Memphis, Muscle Shoals, Philadelphia, New Orleans, and of course, Detroit." Estelle said in 2008, "Every song is like a different era of Motown ... Everything sounds exactly like it did back in the day. Not to take away from Amy, but this is the real shit." It was described by David Nathan as the "contemporary album that was the closest to authentically recreating the great soul music sound of the late '60s and early '70s." Ken Tucker found it distinct from other soul revival music: "You can reproduce variations on melodies and rhythm, but without an emotional commitment, it's all tedious pandering to baby boomers. For Raphael Saadiq, there's a glowing vibrancy in soul music that allows him to work out themes and ideas."

The Way I See It also earned Saadiq the highest international profile of his career. In promoting the album, he broadened his audience demographic and expanded his repertoire as a touring artist. His extensive touring in the US and Europe garnered the attention of younger, white audiences who were not exposed to his previous solo albums and work with Tony! Toni! Toné!. The Press of Atlantic City wrote that the album "brought in a whole new generation of Saadiq fans, with songs such as '100 Yard Dash' striking a chord with even ironic teenagers." According to Gail Mitchell of Billboard, The Way I See It helped Saadiq reach "the major-market hipster crowd, music supervisors and festival bookers." He also attained a following among Japanese audiences. Saadiq's touring for the album influenced his approach for recording his next album, Stone Rollin', in 2011, as he noted the louder, raw sound and general feeling of performing live. It also continued his partnership with Charles Brungart, who assisted Saadiq in recording Stone Rollin'.

Saadiq called The Way I See It "the culmination of a lifetime of experiences informed by the music I grew up on." Kristal Hawkins of The Village Voice said that he "hit his artistic maturity" with the album. Robert Christgau remarked on its place in his solo career, "In 1996, Saadiq turned the climactic Tony! Toni! Toné! album into a virtuoso history lesson. Six years later, he tried to dazzle Maxwell in his own reflected glory. Six years later yet again, he outd[id] himself with a fearless return to retro." Elton John, a fan of Saadiq's music since his beginnings with Tony! Toni! Toné!, said that he was "blown away" by The Way I See It, citing it as "my album of the year – a soul record of the highest quality." He subsequently called Saadiq to congratulate him for the album and ask him to play at his AIDS Foundation Academy Award Party in 2009. In an interview for Blues & Soul, Saadiq elaborated on the album's impact on his career: "before that record – after I'd been in Tony Toni Tone! and Lucy Pearl – most people had thought 'Oh well, he's a producer now. He's never gonna be an artist, he's not gonna put the time in' ... The Way I See It showed them that yes, I could put the time in still and be an artist!"

== Track listing ==
The Way I See It track listing
No.	Title	Writer(s)	Producer(s)	Length
1.	"Sure Hope You Mean It"	Raphael Saadiq	Saadiq	3:40
2.	"100 Yard Dash"	Saadiq; Bobby Ozuna	Saadiq; Ozuna^{[a]}	2:18
3.	"Keep Marchin'"	Saadiq	Saadiq	2:37
4.	"Big Easy" (featuring The Infamous Young Spodie and The Rebirth Brass Band)	Saadiq	Saadiq	3:18
5.	"Just One Kiss" (featuring Joss Stone)	Saadiq	Saadiq	2:32
6.	"Love That Girl"	Saadiq; Ozuna	Saadiq; Ozuna^{[a]}	3:04
7.	"Calling" (featuring Rocio Mendoza)	Saadiq; Rocio Mendoza	Saadiq	3:44
8.	"Staying in Love"	Saadiq	Saadiq	2:53
9.	"Oh Girl"	Saadiq	Saadiq	3:34
10.	"Let's Take a Walk"	Saadiq; Greg Curtis	Saadiq	2:28
11.	"Never Give You Up" (featuring Stevie Wonder and CJ Hilton)	Saadiq; Charles L. Hilton	Saadiq	4:12
12.	"Sometimes"	Saadiq; Ozuna	Saadiq; Ozuna^{[a]}	4:06
13.	"Oh Girl (Remix)" (featuring Jay-Z) (bonus track)	Saadiq	Saadiq	3:41

7-inch vinyl bonus track
No.	Title	Writer(s)	Producer(s)	Length
14.	"Seven"	Saadiq	Saadiq	3:01

iTunes bonus track
No.	Title	Writer(s)	Producer(s)	Length
14.	"Kelly Ray"	Saadiq; Howard Lilly	Saadiq	3:29

UK bonus tracks
No.	Title	Writer(s)	Producer(s)	Length
14.	"Big Easy" (Euro version)	Saadiq	Saadiq	4:47
15.	"Come On Home"	Saadiq	Saadiq	3:47

Notes

- ^{^[a]} signifies a co-producer

== Personnel ==
Information is taken from the album credits.

- Jack Ashford – bells, shaker, tambourine, vibraphone
- Rob "Fonksta" Bacon – rhythm guitar
- Paul Baker – harp
- Robert Berg – viola
- Sally Berman – violin
- Robert Brosseau – violin
- Gerry "The Gov" Brown – audio engineer, string engineer
- Charles "Biscuits" Brungardt – audio engineer, engineer, mixing
- Tom Coyne – mastering
- Greg Curtis – organ, piano, Wurlitzer
- Timothy P. Davis – copyist
- Maurice Draughn – harp
- Assa Drori – violin
- Jerry Epstein – viola
- Brent Fischer – concert master
- Armen Garabedian – violin
- Agnes Gottschewski – violin
- Lynn Grants – viola
- Maurice Grants – cello
- Al Hershberger – violin
- Charles "CJ" Hilton Jr. – bongos, drums, piano, vocals
- Michelle Holme – art direction
- Molly Hughes – violin
- Infamous Young Spodie – guest appearance, horn arrangements
- Vahe Jayrikyan – cello
- Kyoko Kashiwagi – violin
- Joe Ketendjian – violin
- Ralph Koch – cover photo
- Johana Krejci – violin
- Jeremy Levy – copyist
- Diane Louie – copyist
- Shanda Lowery – viola
- Leah Lucas – viola
- John Madison – viola
- Constance Markwick – violin
- Rocío Marron – soloist, violin
- Miguel Martinez – cello
- Karolina Naziemiec – viola
- Bobby Ozuna – blocks, bongos, drums, producer, shaker, tambourine
- Raphael Price – violin
- Robert Reed – cello
- Paul Riser – string arrangements
- Jody Robin – viola
- Carl Robinson – string engineer
- Lucas Rojas – horn engineer
- Anatoly Rosinsky – violin
- Elizabeth Rowin – violin
- Raphael Saadiq – audio engineer, audio production, bass, bass guitar, drums, engineer, guitar, keyboards, mixing, piano, producer, sitar, vocals
- Norman Seeff – photography
- Marla Smith – violin
- Christina Soule – cello
- Daniel Stachyra – violin
- Scott Stefanko – viola
- Joss Stone – vocals
- James Tanksley – engineer
- Raymond Tischer – viola
- Judith VanderWeg – cello
- Elizabeth Wilson – violin
- Stevie Wonder – guest appearance, harmonica
- Melody Wootton – violin
- Andrew Wu – violin

== Charts ==
=== Weekly charts ===
Chart performance for The Way I See It
Chart (2008–2009)	Peak position
Belgian Albums (Ultratop Flanders)	69
Belgian Albums (Ultratop Wallonia)	70
Finnish Albums (Suomen virallinen lista)	24
French Albums (SNEP)	13
Dutch Albums (Album Top 100)	64
Norwegian Albums (VG-lista)	16
Swiss Albums (Schweizer Hitparade)	66
UK Albums (Official Charts)	75
US Billboard 200	19
US Top R&B/Hip-Hop Albums (Billboard)	8

=== Year-end charts ===
2009 year-end chart performance for The Way I See It
Chart (2009)	Position
French Albums (SNEP)	87
US Top R&B/Hip-Hop Albums (Billboard)	49

== Release history ==
Release dates for The Way I See It
Region	Date	Label	Ref.
Canada	September 16, 2008	Columbia Records	
France	September 16, 2008	Columbia Records	
United States	September 16, 2008	Columbia Records	
Netherlands	October 10, 2008	Columbia Records	
Japan	March 18, 2009	Sony Music Japan	
Poland	April 6, 2009	Sony BMG	
Germany	April 17, 2009	Sony Music	
Ireland	April 27, 2009	Sony Music	
United Kingdom	April 27, 2009	Sony Music	

== See also ==
- Raphael Saadiq production discography
- Retro style
