= Raphael Saadiq production discography =

This is the discography documenting songs and albums produced by American R&B singer Raphael Saadiq.

== Production discography ==
=== Albums ===
- Introducing Joss Stone by Joss Stone (2007)
- Say That to Say This by Trombone Shorty (2013)
- A Legendary Christmas by John Legend (2018)

=== Tracks ===
Title	Year	Artist(s)	Album
"Yo Baby Yo"	1991	Ralph Tresvant	House Party 2 (soundtrack)
"Ask of You"	1995	Raphael Saadiq	Higher Learning (soundtrack)
"Lady"	1995	D'Angelo	Brown Sugar
"Kissin' You"	1996	Total	Total
"Do You Think About Us?"	1996	Total	Total
"Every Time I Close My Eyes (House of Music Remix)"	1996	Babyface	Every Time I Close My Eyes 12"
"Stressed Out (Remix)"	1996	A Tribe Called Quest, Faith Evans	Stressed Out 12"
"With My Eyes Closed"	1997	Bee Gees	Still Waters
"Don't Say (Raphael Saadiq Remix)"	1997	Jon B.	Don't Say 12"
"Boys and Girls"	1997	Tony! Toni! Toné!	Soul Food (soundtrack)
"Just Me and U" (co-produced by DJ Quik)	1997	Luniz, Raphael Saadiq	Lunitik Muzik
"She's Always in My Hair"	1997	D'Angelo	Scream 2: Music from the Dimension Motion Picture
"Can't Get Enough" (co-produced by Lathan Grady)	1998	Raphael Saadiq, Willie Max	Ride (soundtrack)
"Touch Me"	1998	Solo	4 Bruthas & a Bass
"Nights Like This"	1998	Solo	4 Bruthas & a Bass
"Serious" (co-produced by Antron Haile)	1998	11/11, Monet,	Creepin' Off to da Hide-a-Way
"Somethin' Bout Yo Bidness"	1999	Snoop Dogg, Raphael Saadiq	No Limit Top Dogg
"Because of You"	1999	Joey McIntyre	Stay the Same
"Get Involved" (co-produced by Q-Tip)	1999	Raphael Saadiq, Q-Tip	The PJs (soundtrack)
"Untitled (How Does It Feel)"	2000	D'Angelo	Voodoo
"Soul Sista"	2000	Bilal	Love & Basketball (soundtrack) / 1st Born Second
"Fine" (co-produced by Q-Tip)	2000	Whitney Houston	Whitney: The Greatest Hits
"Don't Come Around" (featuring Sunshine Anderson) (co-produced by Darryl Swann)	2001	Macy Gray	The Id
"2 Way"	2001	Ginuwine	The Life
"Just a Man" (co-produced by Jake and the Phatman)	2001	Devin the Dude, Raphael Saadiq	Baby Boy (soundtrack) / Just Tryin' ta Live
"Move Your Body" (co-produced by Jake and the Phatman)	2001	The Isley Brothers	Eternal
"You Didn't See Me" (co-produced by Jake and the Phatman)	2001	The Isley Brothers	Eternal
"Ernie's Jam" (co-produced by Jake and the Phatman)	2001	The Isley Brothers	Eternal
"Come to Me" (co-produced by Battlecat)	2001	Kenny Lattimore	Weekend
"Brotha" (co-produced by Jake and the Phatman)	2001	Angie Stone	Mahogany Soul
"Brotha Part II" (featuring Alicia Keys and Eve) (co-produced by Jake and the Phatman)	2001	Angie Stone	Mahogany Soul
"Makin' Me Feel" (co-produced by Jake and the Phatman)	2001	Angie Stone	Dr. Dolittle 2 (soundtrack) / Mahogany Soul
"Love of My Life (An Ode to Hip-Hop)" (featuring Common)	2002	Erykah Badu	Brown Sugar (soundtrack)
"So So Dumb" (co-produced by Jake and the Phatman)	2002	TLC	3D
"So Sweet" (co-produced by Jake and the Phatman)	2003	Kelly Price	Priceless
"Leave This Morning"	2003	Nappy Roots, Raphael Saadiq	Wooden Leather
"Work in Progress" (co-produced by Jake and the Phatman)	2003	Nappy Roots	Wooden Leather
"Falling Out" (co-produced by Jake and the Phatman)	2003	Calvin Richardson	2:35 PM
"She's Got the Love" (co-produced by Jake and the Phatman)	2003	Calvin Richardson	2:35 PM
"Glow" (co-produced by Kelvin Wooten and Jake & The Phatman)	2003	Kelis	Tasty
"Attention" (featuring Raphael Saadiq)" (co-produced by Kelvin Wooten and Jake & The Phatman)	2003	Kelis	Tasty
"Marathon" (co-produced by Kelvin Wooten and Jake & The Phatman)	2003	Kelis	Tasty
"Ready Now" (co-produced by Kelvin Wooten)	2004	Truth Hurts	Ready Now
"Phone Sex" (co-produced by Kelvin Wooten)	2004	Truth Hurts	Ready Now
"Lifetime"	2004	Truth Hurts	Ready Now
"U"	2004	Truth Hurts	Ready Now
"Spring Summer Feeling" (co-produced by Kelvin Wooten)	2004	Jill Scott	Beautifully Human: Words and Sounds Vol. 2
"The Boogie Man Song" (co-produced by Mos Def)	2004	Mos Def	The New Danger
I Found My Everything" (co-produced by Jake and the Phatman)	2005	Mary J. Blige, Raphael Saadiq	The Breakthrough
"So Lady" (co-produced by Jake and the Phatman)	2005	Mary J. Blige, Raphael Saadiq	The Breakthrough
"Soul Food"	2005	Leela James	A Change Is Gonna Come
"Rain" (co-produced by Jake and the Phatman)	2005	Leela James	A Change Is Gonna Come
"Ask of You"	2005	Mashonda, Raphael Saadiq	January Joy
"So Amazing"	2005	Beyoncé and Stevie Wonder	So Amazing: An All-Star Tribute to Luther Vandross
"Show Me the Way"	2005	Earth, Wind & Fire	Illumination
"Work It Out"	2005	Earth, Wind & Fire	Illumination
"Pass You By"	2005	Earth, Wind & Fire	Illumination
"The Way You Move" (with Kenny G)	2005	Earth, Wind & Fire	Illumination
"Imagination" (co-produced by Kelvin Wooten)	2005	Floetry	Flo'Ology
"Walk These Streets" (co-produced by Jake and the Phatman)	2005	Warren G, Raphael Saadiq	In the Mid-Nite Hour
"Coming Home" (co-produced by Jake and the Fatty)	2005	Bizarre, Raphael Saadiq	Hannicap Circus
"Ain't Nobody Worryin'" (co-produced by Jake and the Phatman)	2005	Anthony Hamilton	Ain't Nobody Worryin'
"Take Me"	2005	Teedra Moses, Raphael Saadiq	Complex Simplicity
"Dance with Yesterday"	2006	Joi	Tennessee Slim Is the Bomb
"Living Proof" (co-produced by Jake and the Phatman)	2006	Kelis	Kelis Was Here
"Circus" (co-produced by Jake and the Phatman)	2006	Kelis	Kelis Was Here
"Show Me"	2006	John Legend	Once Again
"Better Man" (co-produced by Jake and the Phatman)	2007	Musiq Soulchild	Luvanmusiq
"P.Y.T."	2008	Noel Gourdin	After My Time
"Special"	2008	Chanté Moore	Love the Woman
"Love Never Changes"	2009	Ledisi	Turn Me Loose
"Please Stay"	2009	Ledisi	Turn Me Loose
"Every Time I Turn Around"	2009	Joss Stone	Colour Me Free!
"Color"	2009	Mary J. Blige	Stronger with Each Tear
"I Want You Back" (featuring Victoria Justice)	2011	Victorious Cast	Victorious: Music from the Hit TV Show
"Can't Wait" (featuring Estelle)	2013	Booker T. Jones	Sound the Alarm
"Mouth to Mouth"	2014	Paloma Faith	A Perfect Contradiction
"Love Only Leaves You Lonely"	2014	Paloma Faith	A Perfect Contradiction
"Walk Out on Me"	2015	Courtney Love	Empire: Original Soundtrack from Season 1
"Flesh"	2015	Miguel	Wildheart
"Gin & Juice (Let Go My Hand)"	2015	Andra Day	Cheers to the Fall
"Champions" (with Rubén Blades)	2016	Usher	Hard II Love
"Rise"	2016	Solange	A Seat at the Table
"Weary"	2016	Solange	A Seat at the Table
"Interlude: The Glory Is in You"	2016	Solange	A Seat at the Table
"Cranes in the Sky"	2016	Solange	A Seat at the Table
"Interlude: Dad Was Mad"	2016	Solange	A Seat at the Table
"Mad" (featuring Lil Wayne)	2016	Solange	A Seat at the Table
"Where Do We Go"	2016	Solange	A Seat at the Table
"Junie"	2016	Solange	A Seat at the Table
"Mighty River"	2017	Mary J. Blige	Mudbound
"Peace of Mind" (featuring Faith Evans)	2017	Little Dragon	Non-album single
"Wolf" (featuring Quiñ)	2017	Miguel	War & Leisure
"Just Friends" (featuring Amber Mark)	2018	Chromeo	Head over Heels
"I'm Good"	2018	En Vogue	Electric Café
"Easy"	2018	Anna Wise & Xavier Omär	Insecure: Music from the HBO Original Series, Season 3
"We Need Love"	2019	John Legend	Songland
"Bigger Than the Both of Us" (featuring Gin Gin)	2020	Too $hort	The Vault
"I Do"	2020	John Legend	Bigger Love
"Slow Cooker"	2020	John Legend	Bigger Love
"Pain Away" (featuring Lil Durk)	2020	Meek Mill	QUARANTINE PACK
"Tigress & Tweed"	2021	Andra Day	The United States vs. Billie Holiday (Music from the Motion Picture)
"Chain of Fools"	2021	Cynthia Erivo	Genius: Aretha
"Formwela 1"	2021	Esperanza Spalding	Songwrights Apothecary Lab
"Formwela 2" (featuring Ganavya)	2021	Esperanza Spalding	Songwrights Apothecary Lab
"Formwela 3"	2021	Esperanza Spalding	Songwrights Apothecary Lab
"Dream in Color" (co-produced by Terrace Martin)	2021	Cordae	Just Until...
"You Deserve It All"	2021	John Legend	Non-album single
"Skydive"	2021	Alicia Keys	Keys
"Best of Me"	2021	Alicia Keys	Keys
"Love When You Call My Name"	2021	Alicia Keys	Keys
"Only You"	2021	Alicia Keys	Keys
"Jean-Michel" (co-produced by Kid Culture)	2022	Cordae	From a Birds Eye View
"Loose Change"	2022	Brent Faiyaz	Wasteland
"Ghetto Gatsby" (featuring Alicia Keys)	2022	Brent Faiyaz	Wasteland
"Angel"	2022	Brent Faiyaz	Wasteland
"Cuff It"	2022	Beyoncé	Renaissance
"Pure/Honey"	2022	Beyoncé	Renaissance
"Go in Light" (featuring Monica Martin)	2022	Marcus Mumford	Self-Titled
"Moon Girl Magic"	2022	Diamond White	Moon Girl and Devil Dinosaur
"Do You Like Me?" (co-produced by Daniel Ceasar)	2023	Daniel Caesar	Never Enough
"16 Carriages"	2024	Beyoncé	Cowboy Carter
"Texas Hold Em"	2024	Beyoncé	Cowboy Carter
"Bodyguard"	2024	Beyoncé	Cowboy Carter

== Composition discography ==
Year	Title	Format	Network
2024	Freaky Tales	Film	Lionsgate
2023	Moon Girl and Devil Dinosaur	Series	Disney Channel
2020	Lovecraft Country, Season 1	Series	HBO
2019	Godfather of Harlem, Season 1	Series	Epix
2018	Insecure, Season 3	Series	HBO
2018	The After Party	Film	Netflix
2018	The Red Line	Series	CBS
2018	Murder	Pilot	
2018	L.A.'s Finest	Series	Sony Television
2017	"A Mighty River" from Mudbound	Song from Film	Netflix
2017	Insecure, Season 2	Series	HBO
2017	Underground, Season 2	Series	WGN
2017	Step	Film	Fox Searchlight Pictures
2017	Rebel	Series	BET
2016	Insecure, Season 1	Series	HBO
2016	Underground, Season 1	Series	WGN
2013	Black Nativity	Film	Fox Searchlight
