= 100 Yard Dash =

2009 single by Raphael Saadiq

Single by Raphael Saadiq

from the album The Way I See It
- Released: March 30, 2009
- Recorded: 2008
- Genre: Soul
- Length: 2:18
- Label: Columbia
- Songwriters: Bobby Ozuna, Raphael Saadiq
- Producer: Raphael Saadiq

Raphael Saadiq singles chronology
"Love That Girl" (2008)	"100 Yard Dash" (2009)	"Never Give You Up" (2009)

"100 Yard Dash" is a song by American recording artist Raphael Saadiq, released as a single on March 30, 2009, by Columbia Records. It was the second single from Saadiq's 2008 album The Way I See It. "100 Yard Dash" is an upbeat soul song about love as a fast, impulsive race. Although it did not chart, the song was well received by music critics.

== Music and lyrics ==
"100 Yard Dash" sample

"100 Yard Dash" is a short, upbeat song with a traditional soul style, tambourine shakes, and a stiff backbeat. Percussionist Jack Ashford played characteristically funky, tambourine shuffle notes on the song.

The song's lyrics express playful physicality, and liken love to a fast race that impels a man's heart: "My heart is pumping but still running in place". Arts critic Ken Tucker views "100 Yard Dash" as exemplary of "top-rate" soul songwriting, writing that, "Saadiq takes an unorthodox metaphor ... and he earns it by the variations he sustains verbally, increasing the tension in the song." Saadiq sings at an uncharacteristically high pitch, the highest of any song on the album.

== Music video ==
A music video for the song was released on January 27, 2009. It was filmed in black-and-white and incorporated splashes of color in graphics inspired by classic Reprise and Blue Note Records album covers. Saadiq wanted the video to serve as an "extension" of the song's album and evoke the music era that inspired its sound.

== Live performances ==
Saadiq performed the song on Live from the Artists Den on December 3, 2008. He also performed the song on The Tonight Show with Jay Leno on February 10, 2009, and on Dancing with the Stars on May 13. Niccole Culver of Creative Loafing cited the song as a "crowd favorite" in a review of Saadiq's performance at the Variety Playhouse in Atlanta.

== Reception ==
Luke Grundy of The Independent called "100 Yard Dash" "irrepressibly funky", and Time Out's Areif Sless-Kitain cited it as one of the "strongest tracks" on The Way I See It. Thomas Fawcett of The Austin Chronicle commented that it "demands a sprint to the dance floor." Misha Berson of The Seattle Times complimented "Saadiq's high, sweet voice" and the song's "slick soul arrangement," writing that it "evokes happy memories of '60s Motown stars like Marvin Gaye and The Temptations in their prime." Ken Tucker of NPR praised the song's "propulsive melody" and viewed it as "a brilliant take on Smokey Robinson and the Miracles." Michael Menachem of Billboard found the song to be "complemented by Saadiq's vocal, with emphasis in all the right places", and "recorded in the classic tradition of short R&B songs: It leaves listeners wanting more, so they play the record again and again."

Nate Chinen of The New York Times named "100 Yard Dash" one of the top-five singles of 2008. The single did not chart.

== Personnel ==
Credits adapted from liner notes for The Way I See It.

- Jack Ashford – bells, shaker, tambourine, vibraphone
- Charles Brungardt – recording engineer
- Tom Coyne – mastering
- Bobby Ozuna – co-producer, composer
- Raphael Saadiq – composer, instrumentalist, mixing, producer, recording engineer, vocals
