= After My Time =

Studio album by Noel Gourdin
- Released: July 22, 2008
- Length: 47:57
- Label: Epic
- Producers: Terence "Tramp-Baby" Abney; D'Mile; Dre & Vidal; Eddie F; KayGee; Darren Lighty; Balewa Muhammad; Thomas Oliveira; Salaam Remi; Raphael Saadiq; Soundz; StayBent Krunk-a-Delic; Trendsettas; Weswind

Noel Gourdin chronology
After My Time (2008)	Fresh: The Definition (2011)

Singles from After My Time
- 1. "The River"

After My Time is the debut studio album by American R&B singer Noel Gourdin. It was released by Epic Records on July 22, 2008. The album includes the single "The River".

== Critical reception ==
Professional ratings
Review scores
Source	Rating
About.com	3.5/5 stars
AllMusic	3.5/5 stars
USA Today	3/4 stars

AllMusic editor Andy Kellman found that while "even the productions that are synth-spiked or more hip-hop-oriented [...] don't register as flagrant attempts to top the pop chart; yet, at the same time, they add a necessary dimension and another level of appeal to Gourdin's debut." Boston Globe critic Siddhartha Mitter called After My Time an "album of assured R&B for grown folks." She remarked that "at 13 songs, the program is concise and there's little filler - this is an album worth hearing in full [...] He's a real singer, with texture and control." Steve Jones of USA Today praised Gourdin's debut for its timeless R&B appeal, highlighting his soulful storytelling, smooth vocals, and blend of classic influences with contemporary themes.

== Track listing ==
After My Time track listing
No.	Title	Writer(s)	Length
1.	"One Love"	Natasha Bouknight; Antwann Frost; Ronald Frost; Noel Gourdin; Brande Kelly	3:37
2.	"Better Man"	Peter Zora; Nickolas Ashford; Antea Birchett; Anesha Birchett; Brian Coleman; Keir Gist; Otis Shelton; Valerie Simpson	3:47
3.	"The River"	Terence "Tramp-Baby" Abney; Gist; Arama Brown; Raeford Gerald; Gourdin; Luther Lynch; Balewa Muhammad; Frank Oliphant; Kosha Dawson; Marcellus "Handz Down" Dawson	3:32
4.	"Open"	Rico Love; Salaam Remi	3:43
5.	"Hurts Like Hell"	Damien Desandes; Gourdin; Wesley McClinton; Muhammad; Oliphant; Thomas Oliveira; Minnie Riperton	3:55
6.	"Led You On"	Kenneth Coby; Pierre Medor	3:19
7.	"Reach"	Kadis & Sean; Ezekiel "Zeke" Lewis; Muhammad; Candice Nelson; Patrick "J. Que" Smith; Oliveira	3:28
8.	"I Fell"	Christopher Breaux; Antwoine "T-Wizz" Collins; Brian Seals	3:57
9.	"P.Y.T."	Gourdin; Robert Ozuna; Raphael Saadiq	3:19
10.	"Sorry"	Dernst Emile; Ronnie Foster	3:32
11.	"Summertime"	Andrian Adams; Vidal Davis; Andre Harris; Ezekiel Lewis; Muhammad; Thabiso Nkhereanye	4:01
12.	"Too Late"	Adams; Edward "DJ Eddie F" Ferrell; Gourdin; Darren Lighty; Clifton Lighty; Muhammad; Addarlly Wilson	3:45
13.	"Make the Most"	Brown; Desandes; Gourdin; Hende; McClinton; Muhammad; Oliphant; Oliveira	4:02
Total length:			47:57

Sample credits

- "The River" contains sampled elements from "How Do You Feel the Morning After?" as performed by Millie Jackson.

== Personnel ==
- A&R – Brandon Creed, Chad Elliott, Juli Knapp
- A&R [Administration] – Ryan Santomauro
- A&R [Operations] – Jennifer Gray, Julie Ann Marsibilio
- Art Direction, Design – Denise Trotman
- Executive-Producer – Balewa Muhammad, Thomas "T.O." Oliveira
- Legal [Counsel] – Amilcar Priestley, COI Consulting
- Legal [Trakaddix Legal Representation] – Amilcar Priestley
- Management – Larry "Lucky" Fernandes, Stalin Entertainment
- Management [Marketing] – Courtney Adams
- Mastered By – Dave Kutch
- Mixed By – "You Can Ask" Giz (tracks: 1), Danny Romero (tracks: 9), Manny Marroquin (tracks: 2 to 6, 8), Rich Keller (tracks: 5, 7, 13), Sheldon Goode (tracks: 12), Vincent DiLorenzo (tracks: 11)
- Mixed By [Assistant] – Aljulah Cutts (tracks: 1), Christian Plata (tracks: 2, 4, 6), Jared Robbins (tracks: 3), Loren Howard (tracks: 12), Mike Tsarfati (tracks: 11)
- Photography By – Mike Schreiber
- Public Relations [Publicity] – Courtney Lowery, Simone Smalls
- Recorded By – Adam Miele (tracks: 2), Charles Brungardt (tracks: 9), David Hyman (tracks: 7), D. Emile (tracks: 10), Eddie "ShyBoogs" Timmons (tracks: 1), Frank "Sekay" Oliphant (tracks: 3, 5, 13), Franklin Emmanuel Socorro (tracks: 4), Karl Heibron (tracks: 6), Loren Howard (tracks: 12), T.O. (tracks: 5, 13), Vincent DiLorenzo (tracks: 11)
- Recorded By [Assistant] – Erick Ferrell (tracks: 12), Kevin Perry (tracks: 12), Mike Tsarfati (tracks: 11), Trent Privat (tracks: 6)

== Charts ==
Chart performance for After My Time
Chart (2008)	Peak position
US Billboard 200	36
US Top R&B/Hip-Hop Albums (Billboard)	4
