= Stone Rollin' =

Studio album by Raphael Saadiq
- Released: March 25, 2011
- Studio: Blakeslee Recording Company (Los Angeles)
- Genres: Rhythm and blues; rock; soul; blues; funk; psychedelia; progressive soul
- Length: 43:11
- Label: Columbia
- Producer: Raphael Saadiq

Raphael Saadiq chronology
The Way I See It (2008)	Stone Rollin' (2011)	Jimmy Lee (2019)

Singles from Stone Rollin'
- 1. "Radio" Released: December 21, 2010; 2. "Good Man" Released: February 15, 2011; 3. "Stone Rollin'" Released: March 22, 2011

Stone Rollin' is the fourth studio album by the American R&B singer, songwriter, and producer Raphael Saadiq. It was released on March 25, 2011, by Columbia Records and recorded at Saadiq's studio Blakesee Recording Company in Los Angeles over the course of a year.

Saadiq was inspired by the loud, raw quality of his concert performances in support of the 2008 album The Way I See It, leading him to pursue a grittier, more aggressive sound for Stone Rollin'. Joined again by sound engineer Charles Brungardt, he expanded on its predecessor's traditional soul music style with sounds from rhythm and blues, rock, funk, blues, and psychedelic music. Most of the album's instrumentation was played by Saadiq, including the prominently featured Mellotron keyboard. With the help of arranger Paul Riser and engineer Gerry Brown, the singer also incorporated string and orchestral arrangements to the songs.

A widespread critical success, Stone Rollin' was deemed by some reviewers as Saadiq's best work and noted for its stylistic breadth, groove-based compositions, and varied subject matter. It also became the singer's highest-charting album in the United States, reaching number 14 on the Billboard 200. He supported the release with a concert tour from March to August 2011.

== Background ==
In 2008, Raphael Saadiq released his third album The Way I See It, which featured 1960s Motown Sound-inspired songs with traditional soul music influences. The album was also an exemplary release of the "classic soul revival" during its peak at the time, a music scene marked by similarly retro-minded work from mainstream artists such as Amy Winehouse and Adele, independent acts such as Sharon Jones & the Dap-Kings and Mayer Hawthorne, and older artists making comebacks such as Al Green and Bettye LaVette. In promoting the album, Saadiq broadened his audience demographic and expanded as a touring artist, playing various music festivals throughout Europe and the United States. Along with the musical aesthetic of the album, Saadiq himself adopted a vintage soul image, donning old-fashioned attire and performing traditional R&B dance moves at shows. His touring also inspired his approach for Stone Rollin', as he considered the louder, raw sound and general feeling of performing live.

Saadiq has said of his creative intentions with the follow-up, "I’ve never shut my ears to anything, really. It's not like I’m always looking for things, either, but I can't close my ears to any music. Any guitar, any drums, any rhythm section— I’ve always been open to those things, trying to understand what makes them work in a song". He was influenced by early rock and roll artists such as Chuck Berry and Bo Diddley, and has cited blues musician Howlin' Wolf as an influence on the album's sound, which he described as "bluesy" and "harder" than that of his previous album, with more aggressive tempos. In an interview for Bullett Magazine, Saadiq explained his idea of the album's title, stating "Stone Rollin' basically symbolizes the action of throwing dice and taking chances with life. That's what I've done my whole career—taking chances with different styles of music and making choices that other people would be afraid to take. Stone Rollin' means I'm going all the way out there this time".

== Recording and production ==
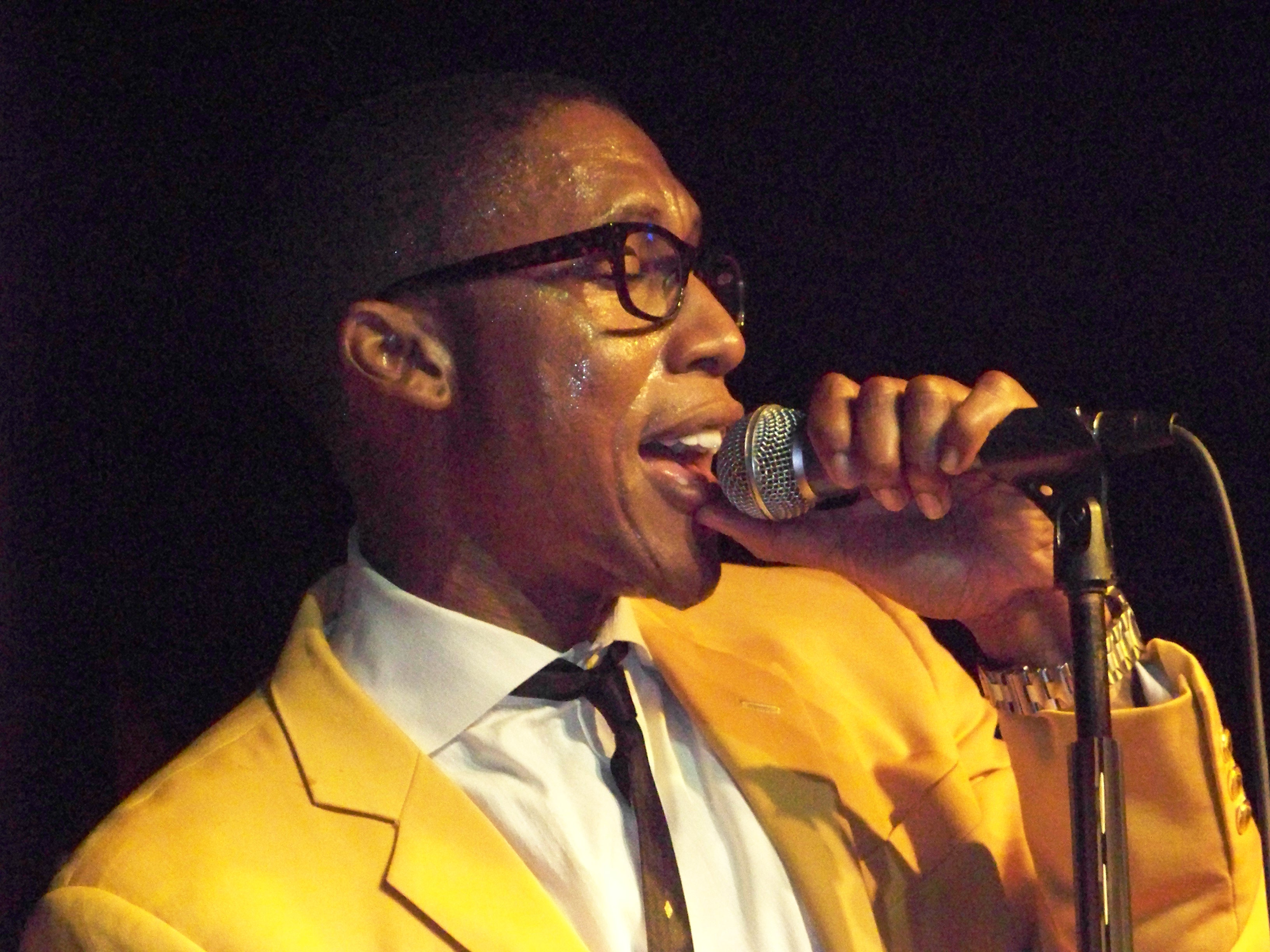
Saadiq (pictured in 2008) recorded his vocals using a dynamic microphone, due in part to its grainy sonic character.

Saadiq recorded Stone Rollin' at Blakeslee Recording Company, his recording studio complex in Los Angeles, California. He spent approximately one year working on the album, including writing its music and lyrics. He worked on the album's production with recording engineer and long-time collaborator Charles Brungardt. The two shared an interest in collecting vintage musical gear and studying historic recording techniques, which they had applied in recording The Way I See It. However, for Stone Rollin', they sought to eschew its predecessor's Motown aesthetic for a more eclectic style, in keeping with Saadiq's other musical projects.

According to Brungardt, the recording of the project's earlier songs, "Heart Attack", was critical in their decision for the album. The song was recorded during Saadiq's break from touring for The Way I See It and had originally featured that album's sound, with which they were not satisfied. When they revisited the song, Saadiq reconstructed the original recording after stripping track's individually recorded instrument parts, with the exception of the vocals and some of its drums. In an interview for EQ Magazine, Brungardt said of their approach, "We wanted to evolve the songs, and I wanted to evolve the engineering, as well. On The Way I See It, everything was pretty much tube pre's and tube compressors. On this one, I wanted to play around with some of the more solid-state gear".

For the majority of the recordings, Saadiq played most of the instruments, including bass, keyboard, guitar, Mellotron, percussion, and drums, and he also layered each recorded instrumental part afterwards. Brungardt used a Neumann U47 microphone to record each of Saadiq's instrument parts. Saadiq recorded his vocals on a dynamic microphone alone in the recording studio's control room, an approach encouraged to him earlier in his career by record producer and audio engineer Gerry Brown. According to Brungardt, "[Saadiq's] voice benefits from a dynamic mic because it tends to give him more bottom and presence. Plus dynamic mics can sound a little older when pushed".

Instead of just having a string section off in the background, I wanted on certain songs for the strings to be more expressive, so I talked to [arranger] Paul Riser about the titles and what I was going for in the songs. I'd say, 'For this word, I want it to be orchestrated this way. When I listen to the song 'Go to Hell', I want to hear the winds in the valley rushing into me'.

— Gerry Brown (2011)

For several songs, Saadiq incorporated lush orchestration and strings as predominant elements. He worked on the orchestral recording with Brown and arranger Paul Riser at Ocean Way Recording's Studio B in Los Angeles, while the songs' horn parts were mostly recorded at the Blakeslee studio. Brown also worked with Saadiq on the album's tracking at Blakeslee. With the songs' guitar parts, Brungardt wanted to create additional distortion in order to produce a grittier guitar sound for the songs, a stylistic preference Saadiq and he had acquired from listening to a great deal of indie rock at the time. He applied several techniques to achieve this sound, including increasing the gain on Saadiq's Fender Twin guitar amplifier, using a software plug-in for the recordings in post-production, and re-amping Saadiq's guitar parts. In his interview for EQ Magazine, Brungardt discussed using a Massey TapeHead, one of his preferred plug-ins, in the recording process, stating "I’ll use that on a lot of things to get a little more grit. It thickens stuff up nicely if you record something that's a little too bright. I usually go a lot for darker tones when recording and mixing".

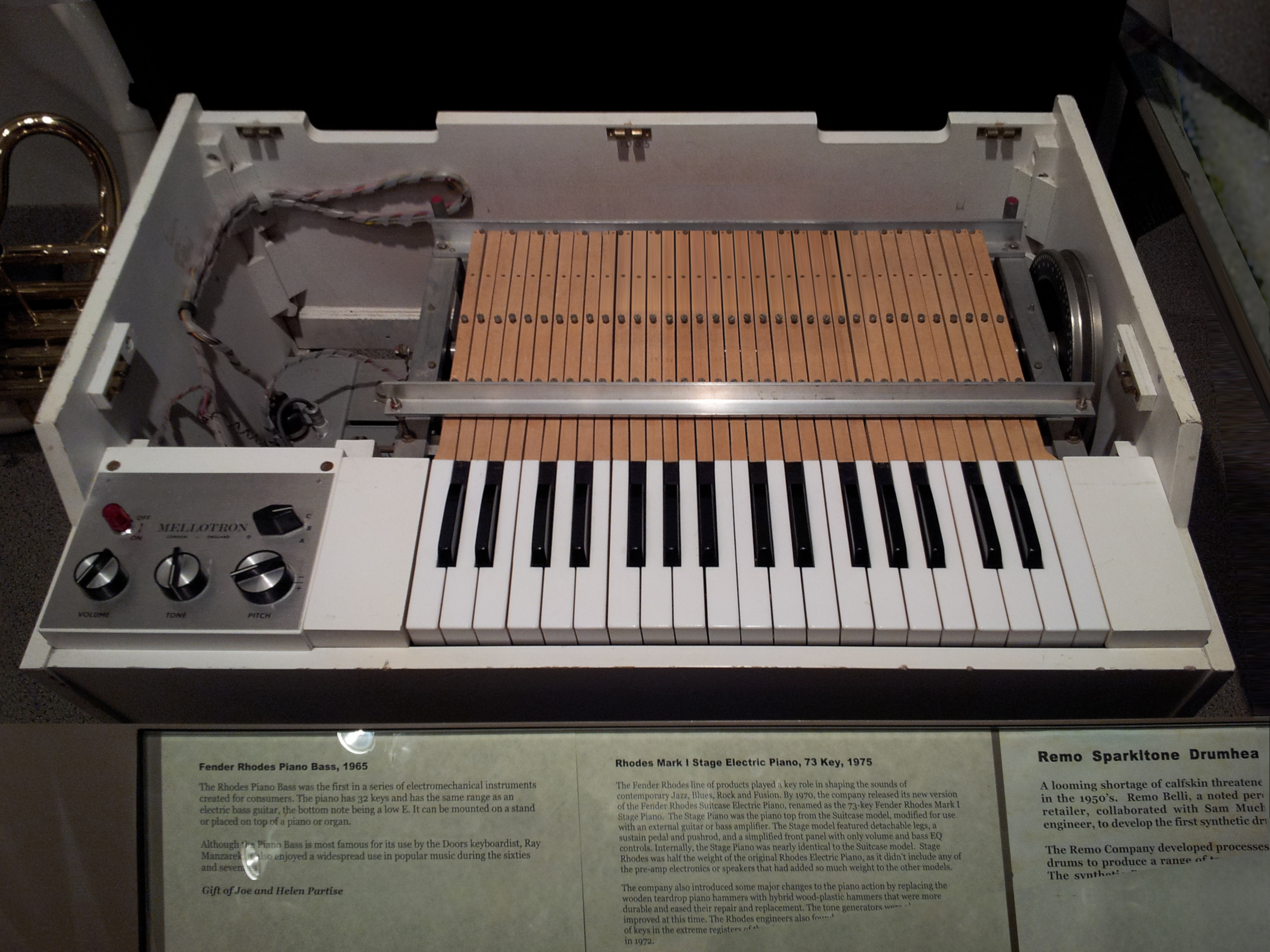
The Mellotron, an old-fashioned keyboard instrument from which Saadiq incorporated sounds

Some of the album's songs were recorded by Saadiq with his live band, which included drummer Lemar Carter, bassist Calvin Turner, and guitarist Rob Bacon. Bacon, who had played with Saadiq since 2002, said of their grittier approach to guitar, "I have relative pitch, as opposed to perfect pitch, so there'd be times when I'd spend 15 or 20 minutes tuning my instrument. Then he'd come in and pick up his guitar and just start playing it however it was left the day before. On one of the tracks I had to play over all this stuff that was out of tune. Raphael was like, 'That's what makes it funky!'". Musical guests such as vocalist Yukimi Nagano, keyboardist Larry Dunn, bass player Larry Graham, keyboardist Amp Fiddler, and pedal steel guitarist Robert Randolph also contributed to the album's recording sessions, with Saadiq selecting their parts for certain tracks. The song "Go to Hell" was conceived from one of Amp Fiddler's Mellotron ideas. Saadiq recorded a duet with Graham called "The Perfect Storm", included as a hidden track on the album: "I played bass, but I put my bass down [laughs]. The first day I tried to play bass for him, I couldn't even play. I froze three times. He's my all-time idol!".

The album was mixed using Pro Tools in Blakeslee Recording Company's Studio A, with the SSL 4000 used mostly for monitoring, and using the SSL 9000 in the "C" room. During mixing, Brungardt used equalization filters such as a McDSP FilterBank plug-in and Waves Renaissance EQ to handle excessive high end in spots, and he utilized other equipment for additional sound effects, including a Line 6 Echo Farm, a Roland Space Echo, and an Echoplex clone.

== Music and lyrics ==
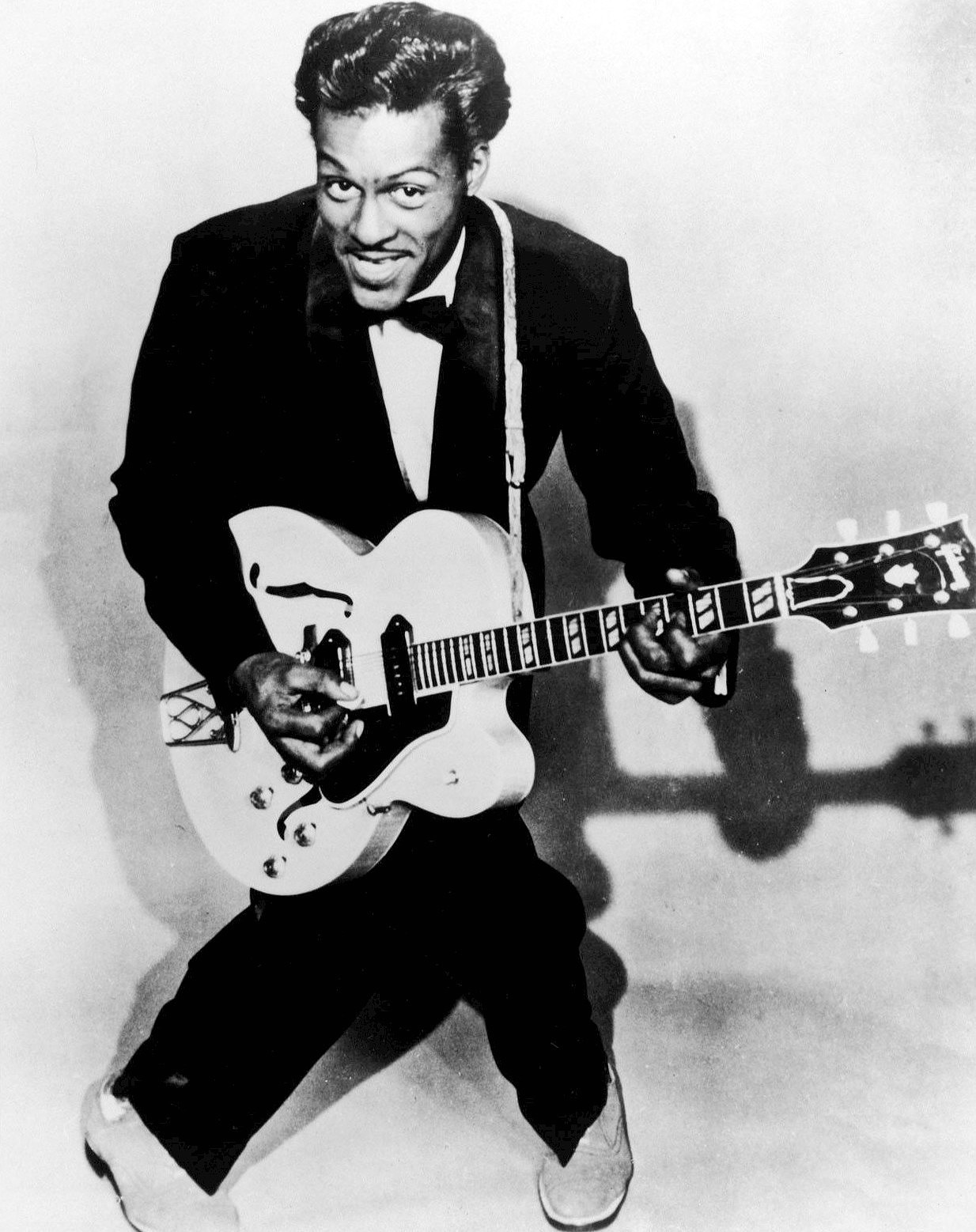
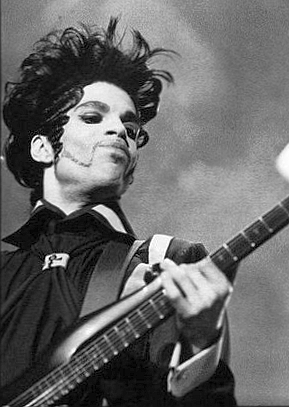
Chuck Berry (left) and Prince (right) have been noted as influences on the album.

Musically, Stone Rollin' expands on the Motown-inspired material of Saadiq's previous album and includes various other R&B styles. Along with mid-tempo soul songs, Stone Rollin' features styles such as early R&B-rooted rock and roll, rock-inspired funk, Chess Records-blues, and the more expansive orchestral sound of post-Detroit Motown and 1970s Philadelphia soul. Disc jockey Chris Douridas described Saadiq's sound as "a hybrid form that's rooted in these familiar elements from classic soul but recontextualized with a modern sound". Nick Butler of Sputnikmusic called the album's songs "belters" and "guitar-heavy", and wrote of its musical influences, "While Prince informs the sound of this more than anybody, it's a very early-'70s sounding album on the whole [...] but there are influences that go back even further than that – Ray Charles and Little Richard in particular inform some of this record's more energetic moments." Los Angeles Times journalist Mikael Wood said of the album's sound and production, "Where Saadiq's previous efforts luxuriated in the layering and the fine-tuning made possible by modern recording gear, Stone Rollin' presents a rawer, rowdier soul-rock sound modeled after his energetic stage show".

Music writer Robert Christgau said Saadiq's compositions are characterized by "groove rather than song". Andy Kellman of AllMusic wrote that the songs are "tied together by the Mellotron, a vintage keyboard – commonly associated with psychedelic and progressive rock recordings, but not foreign to soul – that evokes diseased flutes and wheezing strings", adding that "Saadiq tends to use the instrument for shading". Music journalist Jim DeRogatis observed "a little less Motown gloss" than The Way I See It and "a little more rock grit in Saadiq's grooves, heavy on the Sly Stone (witness the opening 'Heart Attack'), late '50s/early '60s Isley Brothers (the joyful 'Radio'), and Ray Charles ('Day Dreams'), to say nothing of the skillful use of Mellotron orchestrations as a connecting thread throughout the disc, sort of like the Moody Blues suddenly finding the funk ('The Answer')." Steve Horowitz from PopMatters found the songs' subject matter to be assorted and said that Saadiq "personalizes each song so they seem connected as just the many aspects of one man's existence and experience".

"Go to Hell"
"Go to Hell" heavily incorporates the Mellotron keyboard, gospel music, and spiritual views of hardship, redemption, and love.

The opening track, "Heart Attack", is a rock and roll/soul song that incorporates driving bass, reverberating rhythm guitar, and a four-on-the-floor drum beat. It is an homage to one of Saadiq's musical idols, Sly Stone, and was inspired by Sly and the Family Stone songs "M'Lady" and "Dance to the Music", whose burbling background vocals are referenced in "Heart Attack". Saadiq said he wanted to open Stone Rollin' "with that sense of urgency, that global soul and rock & roll feel". On "Go to Hell", he alludes to his adopted surname with the line "I'm going to be a warrior of everything I say"; "Saadiq" means "man of his word" in Arabic. He played a rockabilly style of guitar on "Radio", which portrays a disapproving woman as the personification of mainstream radio: "I met this girl named Radio / said her signal was low / she wasn't getting my sound". According to Saadiq, the line "I tried to move away / she found me the very next day" alludes to his affinity for his musical roots and those of rock and roll.

The album's title track was written as an ode to curvaceous, full-figured women, backed by a sound Saadiq described as "dirty, more of like a Chicago blues, Rolling Stones dirty record ... the bluesiest joint" on the album. "Movin' Down the Line", an ode to a love unrequited, features mellow horns, jangling guitar, heavy bass lines, and a swelling string and piano conclusion. In the opinion of Lloyd Bradley, the song exemplifies the album's combination of traditional styles and contemporary production: "It has every bit of digital snap needed to succeed among today’s sounds; but Saadiq's masterful use of a big brass section lurking w-a-a-ay into the background picks the tune up and puts it down in a completely different era. The song turns out both laidback and urgent at the same time, and is utterly irrepressible for it".

"Good Man"
"Good Man" features classic soul and Brill Building sounds, and a slow-burning narrative about betrayal.

Containing a psychedelic funk sound, "Just Don't" is sung from the point of view of a dejected narrator as realizes his woman has moved on from him. The song features guest vocals by Yukimi Nagano and an extended Moog solo played by Larry Dunn. "Good Man" contains plaintive lyrics, a hook co-written and sung by vocalist Taura Stinson, and lyrics about a man mourning his partner's unfaithfulness. The album's closing track, "The Answer", features a wistful, jazz-funk sound, and lyrics expressing a call for collective and individual responsibility. Saadiq said, "I always have a song similar to that on my albums. I was just thinking about growing up in Oakland and all the older people and mentors who helped me out at the time. So I just wanted to throw it back and say thank you, and tell all the kids out there to listen to the people trying to guide them".

== Marketing and sales ==
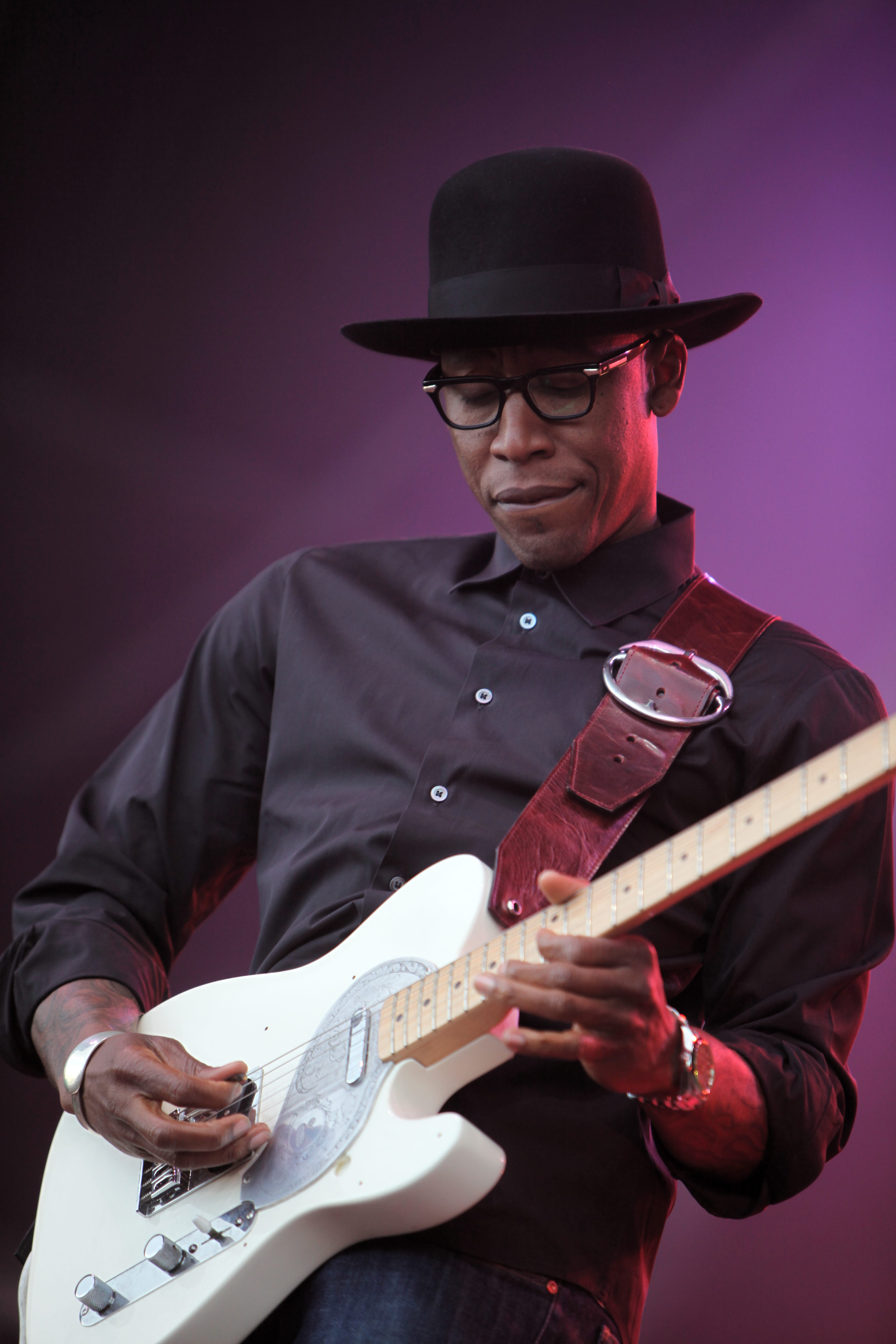
Saadiq performing at France's Eurockéennes de Belfort in July 2011

Stone Rollin' was promoted with the release of three singles: "Radio" on December 21, 2010, "Good Man" on February 15, 2011, and the title track on March 22. A music video for "Good Man" was filmed by Isaiah Seret, featuring fashion model Yaya DaCosta and actor Chad L. Coleman. Saadiq performed the title track on The Tonight Show with Jay Leno in March, and on Conan in May. The album was released in March 2011 by Columbia Records and debuted at number 14 on the US Billboard 200, selling 21,000 copies in its first week of release there. It was Saadiq's highest-charting album on the Billboard 200 and reached 32,100 copies in May, according to Nielsen SoundScan.

Saadiq toured in further support of the album throughout North America on a tour that began March 15 at the House of Blues in Dallas and concluded June 8 at Stubb's in Austin, Texas. Some concert dates featured electronic music duo Quadron as an opening act. including performances at music festivals such as South by Southwest and Coachella Valley Music and Arts Festival, for which Saadiq played songs from The Way I See It and Stone Rollin', as well as unreleased material. To reproduce the recorded music onstage, Saadiq performed with an eight-piece band that included bass player Calvin Turner, drummer Lemar Carter, keyboardist Charles Jones, guitarists Rob Bacon and Josh Smith, and backing singers Erika Jerry and BJ Kemp. In contrast to his touring for The Way I See It, Saadiq did not include a horn section for certain shows and played on guitar for a more rock-oriented sound. While travelling between concert dates, Saadiq and his bandmates watched music documentaries for inspiration, including a documentary on Bob Marley and the Wailers and the 1973 film Wattstax. Saadiq expanded his touring for the album into August 2011, with concerts alternating between North American headlining dates and European music festivals, and also toured Europe through March 2012, including as an opening act on Lenny Kravitz's tour.

== Critical reception ==
Stone Rollin' ratings
Aggregate scores
Source	Rating
AnyDecentMusic?	7.6/10
Metacritic	86/100
Review scores
Source	Rating
AllMusic	5/5 stars
The A.V. Club	A−
Entertainment Weekly	B+
The Independent	4/5 stars
Los Angeles Times	3.5/4 stars
Mojo	4/5 stars
MSN Music (Expert Witness)	A−
Rolling Stone	3.5/5 stars
Spin	7/10
USA Today	3.5/4 stars

Stone Rollin' was met with widespread critical acclaim and proved among 2011's best reviewed records. At Metacritic, which assigns a normalized rating out of 100 to reviews from professional publications, the album received an average score of 86, based on 20 reviews. Aggregator AnyDecentMusic? gave it 7.6 out of 10, based on their assessment of the critical consensus.

Reviewing the album for AllMusic, Kellman deemed it not just a "period-piece" but also "the high point of Saadiq's career, his exceptional output with Tony! Toni! Toné! included", while Kevin Ritchie of Now said he exhibited "the electrifying fervour and meticulous musicianship typical of his stage show" on the record. Steve Horowitz from PopMatters wrote that the album "shows off Saadiq's genius as a singer, writer, instrumentalist, and producer of modern rhythm and blues that pays homage to its traditions", adding that it does not have "a false step or even a dull note". In MSN Music, Robert Christgau said Saadiq "plays with himself to beat the band" like Prince and "makes these 10 tracks bump and pulse. And then you notice even the less pneumatic ones connecting as songs." However, he perceived a drop-off from The Way I See It in terms of songwriting and catchiness, singling out "Go to Hell", "Day Dreams", and "Good Man" as the highlights. Slant Magazine's Matthew Cole was more critical, finding the record too involved in fabricating retro sensibilities "to leave a lasting impression of its own ... even the highlights are complacent genre exercises".

At the end of 2011, Stone Rollin' was named one of the year's best albums in several critics' top-10 lists; it was ranked at number one by Thomas Fawcett from The Austin Chronicle, number three by James Reed of The Boston Globe, number six by Los Angeles Times critic Todd Martens, and number seven by Chicago Tribune critic Greg Kot, who also called it Saadiq's greatest work: "He's always written songs steeped in soul and R&B, but now he gives them a progressive edge with roaming bass lines and haunted keyboard textures. He's no longer a retro stylist – he's writing new classics." "Good Man" was nominated for the 2012 Grammy Award for Best Traditional R&B Performance.

== Track listing ==
All songs were produced by Raphael Saadiq and co-produced by Charles Brungardt.

Stone Rollin' track listing
No.	Title	Writer(s)	Length
1.	"Heart Attack"	Raphael Saadiq	3:03
2.	"Go to Hell"	Saadiq; Taura Stinson	4:20
3.	"Radio"	Saadiq	3:22
4.	"Over You"	Saadiq	2:31
5.	"Stone Rollin'"	Saadiq	3:37
6.	"Day Dreams"	Saadiq	3:20
7.	"Movin' Down the Line"	Saadiq	4:25
8.	"Just Don't" (featuring Yukimi Nagano)	Saadiq; Stinson	5:17
9.	"Good Man"	Saadiq; Stinson	3:46
10.	"The Answer"	Saadiq	9:30

Notes

- "The Answer" contains a hidden track, known as "The Perfect Storm".

== Personnel ==
Credits are adapted from the album's liner notes.

=== Musicians ===
- Mark Adams – horn (track 10)
- Sarah Bach – horn (tracks 2, 7, 8)
- Rob Bacon – guitar (track 2)
- Brian Benning – violin (tracks 2, 7, 8)
- Robert Brosseau – violin (track 10)
- Alex Budman – woodwind (track 10)
- Mark Cargill – violin (tracks 2, 7, 8, 10)
- Carl Lemar Carter – drums (tracks 2, 7), additional drums (track 1), snare drums (track 10)
- Giovanna Clayton – cello (tracks 2, 7, 8)
- Dan Foreno – trumpet (tracks 2, 7, 8)
- Jeff Driskill – saxophone (tracks 2, 7, 8), woodwind (track 10)
- Assa Drori – violin (track 10)
- Erika Duke – cello (track 10)
- Larry Dunn – piano (tracks 7, 8), Minimoog (track 8)
- Karen Elaine – viola (tracks 2, 7, 8)
- Garrett Ellis – alto saxophone (track 7)
- Charles Evertt – violin (track 10)
- Amp Fiddler – Mellotron (track 2)
- Samuel Formicola – viola (track 10)
- Todd French – cello (track 10)
- Miguel Gandelman – tenor saxophone (track 7)
- Alex Gorlovsky – violin (track 10)
- Maurice Grants – cello (track 10)
- Dan Higgins – saxophone (tracks 2, 7, 8)
- Johannes Joergensen – guitar (track 10)
- Charles Jones – piano (track 6)
- Vahe Karykian – cello (tracks 2, 7, 8)
- B.J. Kemp – snare drums (track 10)
- Harry Kim – trumpet (tracks 2, 7, 8)
- Paul Klintworth – horn (track 10)
- Johanna Krejci – violin (tracks 2, 7, 8, 10)
- Gina Kronstadt – violin (tracks 2, 7, 8)
- Gayle Levant – harp (tracks 2, 7, 8)
- Jon Lewis – trumpet (track 10)
- Darrell Mansfield – harmonica (track 5)
- Jean Marinelli – horn (tracks 2, 7, 8)
- Miguel Martinez – cello (tracks 2, 7, 8)
- Joe Meyer – horn (track 10)
- Dennis Molchan – violin (track 10)
- Raymond Monteiro – trumpet (track 7)
- Jorge Moraga – viola (tracks 2, 7, 8)
- Yukimi Nagano – vocals (track 8)
- Karolina Naziemiec – viola (track 10)
- Stephanie O'Keefe – horn (tracks 2, 7, 8)
- Mone't Owens – background vocals (tracks 3, 6, 8)
- Robert Randolph – steel guitar (track 6)
- Paul Riser – conductor (track 10), horn arrangement (track 2), orchestral arrangement (track 10), string arrangements (tracks 2, 7, 8, 10)
- Kathleen Robertson – violin (tracks 2, 7, 8)
- Anatoly Rosinsky – violin (tracks 2, 7, 8, 10)
- Robin Ross – viola (tracks 2, 7, 8)
- Raphael Saadiq – bass (tracks 1, 3, 5, 6, 8–10), Clavinet (track 9), drums (tracks 1, 3–5, 8–10), guitar (tracks 5–7), guitars (tracks 1, 3, 4, 8, 9), horn arrangement (track 9), Mellotron (tracks 1, 4, 5, 7–10), producer, percussion (track 1), tambourine (track 9), vocals
- Rob Schaer – trumpet (track 10)
- Harry Shirinian – viola (tracks 2, 7, 8, 10)
- Haim Shtrum – violin (tracks 2, 7, 8)
- Garret Smith – trombone (track 7)
- Taura Stinson – vocals (track 9)
- Lesa Terry – violin (tracks 2, 7, 8, 10)
- JoAnn Tominaga – concertmaster (tracks 2, 7, 8)
- Calvin Turner – bass (tracks 2 and 7), snare drums (track 10), horn arrangement (track 7)
- Wah Wah Watson – additional guitar (track 7)
- Elizabeth Wilson – violin (tracks 2, 7, 8, 10)
- Rodney Wirtz – viola (track 10)
- John Wittenberg – violin (tracks 2, 7, 8)
- Jorge Wittenberg – viola (tracks 2, 7, 8)
- Shari Zippert – violin (tracks 2, 7, 8)

=== Production ===
- Lauren Barford – production coordination
- Mathieu Bitton – art direction, package design
- Gerry "The Gov" Brown – engineer
- Charles Brungardt – engineer, mixing, co-producer
- Bernie Grundman – mastering
- Michelle Holme – art direction
- Marlon Marcel – assistant engineer, engineer
- Alex Prager – photography
- Ricardo Ribeiro – assistant engineer
- Wesley Seidman – assistant engineer

== Charts ==
Chart performance for Stone Rollin'
Chart (2011)	Peak position
Australian Hitseekers Albums Chart	19
Belgian Flanders Alternative Albums Chart	40
Belgian Albums (Ultratop Flanders)	1
Belgian Albums (Ultratop Wallonia)	11
Canadian Albums Chart	82
Dutch Albums (Album Top 100)	38
French Albums (SNEP)	22
Japanese Albums (Oricon)	175
Norwegian Albums (VG-lista)	7
Swiss Albums (Schweizer Hitparade)	56
UK Albums (Official Charts)	84
UK R&B Albums (Official Charts)	8
US Billboard 200	14
US Top R&B/Hip-Hop Albums (Billboard)	3

== Release history ==
Release dates for Stone Rollin'
Region	Date	Ref.
Austria	March 25, 2011	
Belgium	March 25, 2011	
France	March 25, 2011	
Netherlands	March 25, 2011	
Norway	March 25, 2011	
Sweden	March 25, 2011	
Switzerland	March 25, 2011	
United Kingdom	April 4, 2011	
Germany	April 22, 2011	
United States	May 10, 2011	
Australia	May 20, 2011	
