= Love That Girl =

Single by Raphael Saadiq

from the album The Way I See It
- Released: August 5, 2008
- Recorded: 2008
- Genre: Soul
- Length: 3:04
- Label: Columbia
- Songwriters: Bobby Ozuna, Raphael Saadiq
- Producer: Raphael Saadiq

Raphael Saadiq singles chronology
"I Want You Back" (2004)	"Love That Girl" (2008)	"100 Yard Dash" (2009)

"Love That Girl" is a song by American recording artist Raphael Saadiq, released as a single on August 5, 2008, by Columbia Records. It was the lead single for Saadiq's 2008 album The Way I See It. The song was written by Saadiq and co-producer Bobby Ozuna. "Love That Girl" is a Motown-inspired soul song with sweet-natured, innocent lyrics about affection.

The single peaked at number 45 on the Billboard Hot R&B/Hip-Hop Songs. It was nominated for a Grammy Award for Best Traditional R&B Vocal Performance.

== Music and lyrics ==
"Love That Girl" sample

"Love That Girl" is a Motown-inspired soul song with repetitive bass lines, echo chamber-like claps, and call and response choruses. It also features Motown-styled instruments by Jack Ashford, including tambourine, vibraphone, bells, and shakers. Gail Mitchell of Billboard characterizes it as "a swing tune that calls to mind the Temptations' signature brand of suave grooves". Andy Gill of The Independent writes that the song has "the poise of the David Ruffin-era Temptations." The song's lyrics are sweet, innocent, and expressing affection for a love interest. They also feature rhyme schemes similar to those of classic soul songs and restrained falsetto vocals by Saadiq. About.com's Mark Edward Nero finds its subject matter reminiscent of Mary Wells' 1964 song "My Guy".

== Release and reception ==
"Love That Girl" was released as the lead single from The Way I See It. It was released as a digital download on August 5, 2008, by Columbia Records. Its music video was released on August 27, and featured Saadiq and his band in vintage attire, including matching suits and a flowing red dress worn by the backing vocalist. "Love That Girl" was later used as the theme song for the sitcom of the same name, on which Saadiq served as executive producer.

"Love That Girl" charted for 20 weeks on the US Billboard Hot R&B/Hip-Hop Songs, peaking at number 45 on November 15, 2008. It also charted for four weeks and peaked at number 15 in Belgium. The song was nominated for the 2009 Grammy Award for Best Traditional R&B Vocal Performance.

== Personnel ==
Credits adapted from liner notes for The Way I See It.

- Jack Ashford – bells, shaker, tambourine, vibraphone
- Charles Brungardt – recording engineer
- Tom Coyne – mastering
- Bobby Ozuna – co-producer, composer
- Raphael Saadiq – composer, instrumentalist, mixing, producer, recording engineer, vocals

== Charts ==
Chart (2008–09)	Peak position
Belgium (Ultratip Bubbling Under Flanders)	15
US Hot R&B/Hip-Hop Songs (Billboard)	45

== Release history ==
Region	Date	Label	Format
Canada	August 5, 2008	Columbia Records	digital download
United States	August 5, 2008	Columbia Records	digital download
United Kingdom	February 10, 2010	Columbia Records	digital download
