= The River (Noel Gourdin song) =

Single by Noel Gourdin

from the album After My Time
- Released: August 27, 2007
- Genre: R&B
- Length: 3:36
- Label: Epic
- Songwriters: Marcellus "Handz Down" Dawson; Terence Abney; Keir Gist; Arama Brown; Raeford Gerald; Noel Gourdin; Luther Lynch; Balewa Muhammad; Frank Oliphant
- Producers: KayGee for Divine Mill & Lady & A Tramp (Terence "Tramp-Baby" Abney & Marcella Precise) For Lady & A Tramp/Divine Mill & The Trendsettas

Noel Gourdin singles chronology
"The River" (2007)	"The River" (2008)

The River is the debut single from Noel Gourdin from his debut album After My Time. Its intro features a sample from Millie Jackson's 1974 single "How Do You Feel The Morning After". The two songs share the same chord progression and have melodical similarities. Consequently, its two writers, Luther Lynch and Raeford Gerald, received songwriting credits on this song.

The single spent 15 weeks on the Hot Adult R&B Airplay and peaked at #7. It spent 22 weeks on the Hot R&B/Hip-Hop Songs, and peaked at #23. The song appears in the film Welcome Home, Roscoe Jenkins.

== Chart ==
Chart (2008)	Peak Position
U.S. Billboard Hot Adult R&B Airplay	1
Hot R&B/Hip-Hop Singles & Tracks	23

This song is also played on many radio stations.
