= Raphael Saadiq =

American contemporary R&B singer (born 1966)

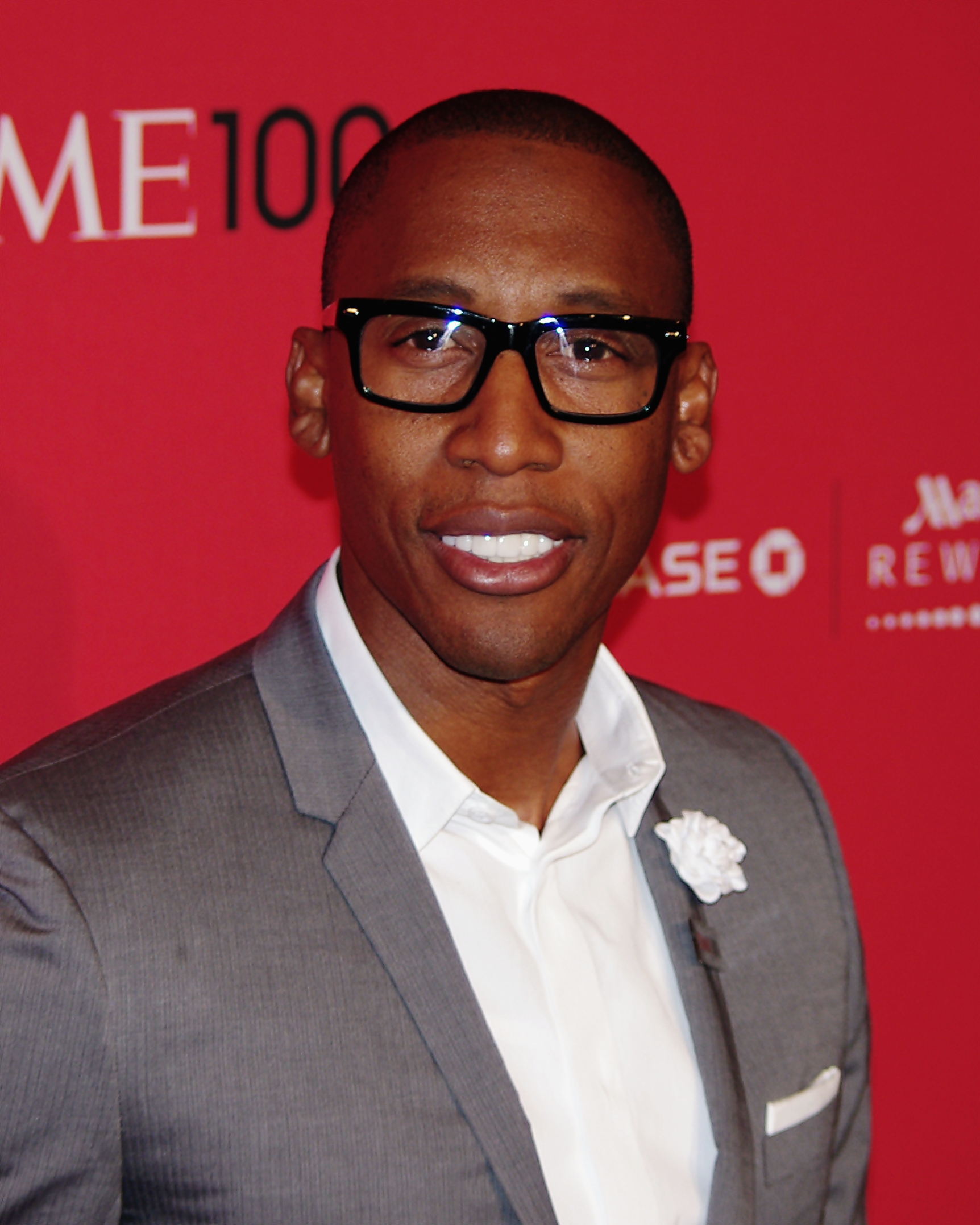
- Saadiq at the 2012 Time 100

Background information
- Born: Charles Ray Wiggins; May 14, 1966 (age 60); Oakland, California, U.S.
- Genres: R&B; soul; progressive soul; hip hop
- Occupations: Singer; songwriter; multi-instrumentalist; record producer
- Instruments: Vocals; piano; keyboards; synthesizer; guitar; bass guitar
- Years active: 1983–present
- Labels: Columbia; Pookie; Universal
- Member of: Tony! Toni! Toné!
- Formerly of: Lucy Pearl; The Ummah
- Website: raphaelsaadiqmusic.com

Raphael Saadiq (/səˈdiːk/ sə-DEEK; born Charles Ray Wiggins; May 14, 1966) is an American singer, songwriter, multi-instrumentalist, and record producer. He rose to prominence as a vocalist and bassist for the R&B band Tony! Toni! Toné!, which he formed with his brother D'Wayne and cousin Timothy Christian Riley in 1986. Originally, the band went by the name "Tony, Toni, Toné" as a joke, until they realized it "had a nice ring to it". Along with his groupwork and solo career, he has produced and written songs for other R&B artists, including Erykah Badu, D'Angelo, Jill Scott, Stevie Wonder, Beyoncé, Total, Earth, Wind & Fire, Joss Stone, TLC, En Vogue, Kelis, Mary J. Blige, Ledisi, Whitney Houston, Solange Knowles and John Legend.

After touring with Prince, Sheila E. and Sheena Easton as a bassist in the mid-1980s, Saadiq co-founded Tony! Toni! Tone!. He went on to release four albums—Who! (1988), The Revival (1990), Sons of Soul (1993), and House of Music (1996)—with the band before their indefinite hiatus. Prior to House of Music, Saadiq released his 1995 debut solo single, "Ask of You", for the soundtrack to the John Singleton film Higher Learning, and he formed the music production unit the Ummah (with D'Angelo, Q-Tip, Ali Shaheed Muhammad, and J Dilla). "Ask of You" peaked within the top 20 of the Billboard Hot 100 and led him to briefly sign with the now-defunct Universal Records as a solo act. In 1999, he formed the supergroup Lucy Pearl with singer Dawn Robinson, as well as Ummah cohort Ali Shaheed Muhammad; the group's self-titled debut album (2000) was supported by the Hot 100-top 40 single "Dance Tonight", and served as their only project before disbanding in 2001.

Saadiq has since released five solo albums, including the critically acclaimed Instant Vintage (2002), Ray Ray (2004), as well as the retro-styled The Way I See It (2008) and Stone Rollin' (2011). The contemporary-sounding Jimmy Lee was released in 2019, and earned Saadiq further acclaim.

Music critic Robert Christgau has called Saadiq the "preeminent R&B artist of the '90s". Saadiq has won three Grammy Awards for his songwriting work out of 22 nominations, as well as two Academy Award nominations, two Golden Globe Award nominations and a Primetime Emmy Award nomination. Outside of music, Saadiq also co-founded the independent video game developer IllFonic in 2007, which has developed Friday the 13th: The Game (2017), Predator: Hunting Grounds (2020) and Ghostbusters: Spirits Unleashed (2022), among other titles.

== Early life ==
Saadiq was born in Oakland, California, and was the second-youngest of 14 siblings. He attended Castlemont High School. He has had four siblings die at early ages. Saadiq states that he does not want his music to be reflective of the tragedies he experienced, saying that "And through all of that I was makin' records, but it wasn't comin' out in the music. I did it to kinda show people you can have some real tough things happen in your life, but you don't have to wear it on your sleeve."

He has been playing the bass guitar since the age of six, and first began singing at age nine in a local gospel group. At the age of 12, he joined a group called "The Gospel Humminbirds". In 1984, shortly before his 18th birthday, Saadiq heard about tryouts in San Francisco for Sheila E.'s backing band on Prince's Parade Tour. At the audition, he chose the name "Raphael", and had difficulty remembering to respond to the name when he heard that he got the part to play bass in the band. He says of the experience, "Next thing I was in Tokyo, in a stadium, singin' Erotic City. We were in huge venues with the biggest sound systems in the world; all these roadies throwin' me basses, and a bunch of models hangin' round Prince to party. For almost two years. That was my university."

== Career ==
=== 1986–1999: Tony! Toni! Toné! and The Ummah ===
As far back as his work with Tony! Toni! Toné!, Raphael Saadiq has been a singer of doubt, of psychic wounds, of romance undergoing a test.

— Ken Tucker, NPR

After returning to Oakland from touring with Prince, Saadiq began his professional career as the lead vocalist and bassist in the rhythm and blues and dance trio Tony! Toni! Toné! He used the name Raphael Wiggins while in Tony! Toni! Toné!, along with his brother Dwayne Wiggins, and his cousin Timothy Christian. In the mid-1990s, he adopted the last name Saadiq, which means "man of his word" in Arabic. His change of surname led many to speculate that he had converted to Islam at that point; in reality, Saadiq is not a Muslim, but rather just liked the way "Saadiq" sounded and changed his last name simply to distinguish himself from and avoid potential confusion with his brother, Dwayne Wiggins. As he confirmed by telling noted R&B writer Pete Lewis of Blues & Soul magazine in May 2009: "I just wanted to have my own identity!"

In 1995, Saadiq had his biggest solo hit to date, when "Ask of You", featured on the Higher Learning Soundtrack peaked at #19 on the Billboard Hot 100 and #2 on the R&B chart. In 1995, Saadiq produced and performed on Otis & Shug's debut album, We Can Do Whatever.

Tony! Toni! Toné! would become major R&B superstars throughout the late 1980s and 1990s. However, after the 1996 album entitled House of Music failed to duplicate the group's previous success, Tony! Toni! Toné! went their separate ways in 1997.

=== 1999–2004: Lucy Pearl and first string of solo albums ===
In 1999, Saadiq's next big project became the R&B supergroup Lucy Pearl. He recorded the self-titled album with Dawn Robinson (En Vogue) and Ali Shaheed Muhammad (A Tribe Called Quest). The group only lasted for one album.

Also in 1999, he collaborated with rapper Q-Tip on the single "Get Involved", from the animated television series The PJs. It samples The Intruders' 1973 song "I'll Always Love My Mama" and charted at number 21 on the US Hot R&B/Hip-Hop Singles & Tracks.

His 2000 song collaboration "Untitled (How Does It Feel)" won D'Angelo a Grammy Award for Best Male R&B Vocal Performance; it was also nominated for Grammy Award for Best R&B Song. The song was ranked #4 on Rolling Stone's "End of Year Critics & Readers Poll" of the top singles of 2000. D'Angelo's album Voodoo won a Grammy Award for Best R&B Album at the 2001 Grammy Awards.

In 2002, Saadiq founded his own record label, Pookie Entertainment. Among the artists on the label are Joi and Truth Hurts. In 2002, he released his first solo album Instant Vintage, which earned him three Grammy Award nominations in addition to another two Grammy nominations for his writing work on “Love of My Life (An Ode to Hip-Hop)” the following year. He released a two-disc live album All the Hits at the House of Blues in 2003, and his second studio album Ray Ray in 2004, both on Pookie Entertainment.

=== 2004–2010: Expanded output and second string of albums ===
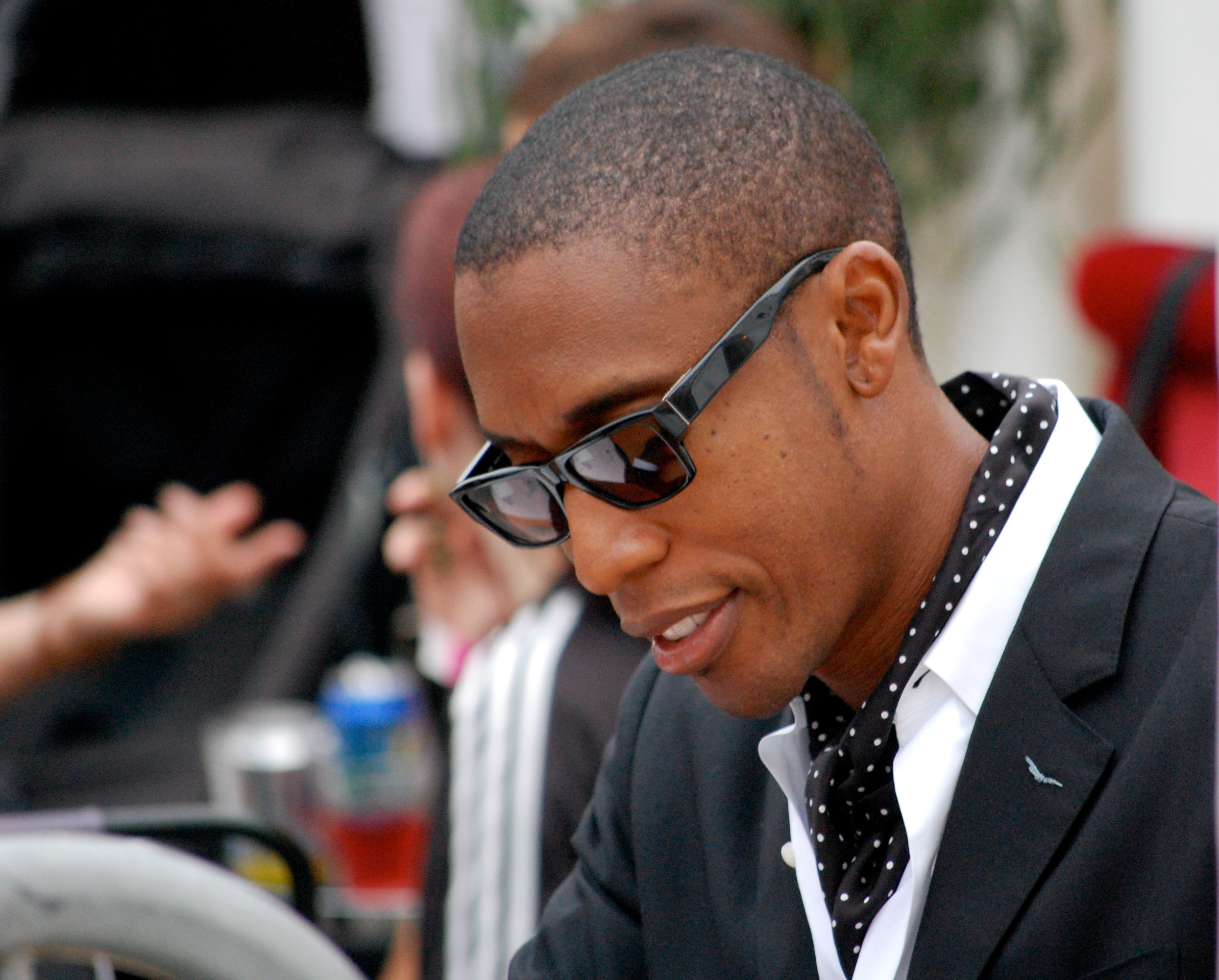
Saadiq in 2009

In 2004, Saadiq produced a remix of the song "Crooked Nigga Too" by Tupac Shakur, which is featured on the album Loyal to the Game. Other artists he has collaborated with include Whitney Houston, Mary J. Blige, The Isley Brothers, A Tribe Called Quest, Teedra Moses, The Roots, Erykah Badu, Jill Scott, Macy Gray, Angie Stone, Snoop Dogg, Mac Dre, Devin the Dude, DJ Quik, Kelis, Q-Tip, Lil' Skeeter, Ludacris, The Bee Gees, Musiq Soulchild, Jaguar Wright, Chanté Moore, Lionel Richie, Marcus Miller, Noel Gourdin, Nappy Roots, Calvin Richardson, T-Boz from TLC, Jody Watley, Floetry, Leela James, Amp Fiddler, John Legend, Joss Stone, Young Bellz, Anthony Hamilton, Babyface, Ledisi, Goapele, Ghostface Killah, Ginuwine, The Grouch, Stevie Wonder, Earth, Wind & Fire, Bilal, Chali 2na, Larry Graham, Luniz as well as many others. In 2007, Saadiq produced Introducing Joss Stone, the third album of British soul singer Joss Stone. According to J. Gabriel Boylan of The New York Observer, "he's produced artists including Macy Gray, the Roots, D'Angelo, John Legend, Whitney Houston, Mary J. Blige, and more. With all of them he's pushed a classic aesthetic, heavy on organic sounds and light on studio magic, deeply indebted to the past and distrustful of easy formulas."

Saadiq's third solo album, The Way I See It, released on Columbia Records on September 16, 2008, available in a collector's edition box set of 7" 45 rpm singles as well as on traditional CD, was critically well-received, made several critics' 2008 best albums lists, and garnered three Grammy nominations including Best R&B Performance by a Duo Or Group With Vocals (for "Never Give You Up", featuring Stevie Wonder & CJ Hilton); Best Traditional R&B Vocal Performance (for "Love That Girl") and Best R&B Album for The Way I See It. Music from The Way I See It was featured in the following motion pictures: Madea Goes To Jail, Bride Wars, Cadillac Records, Secret Life of Bees, In Fighting (Rogue), and It's Complicated.

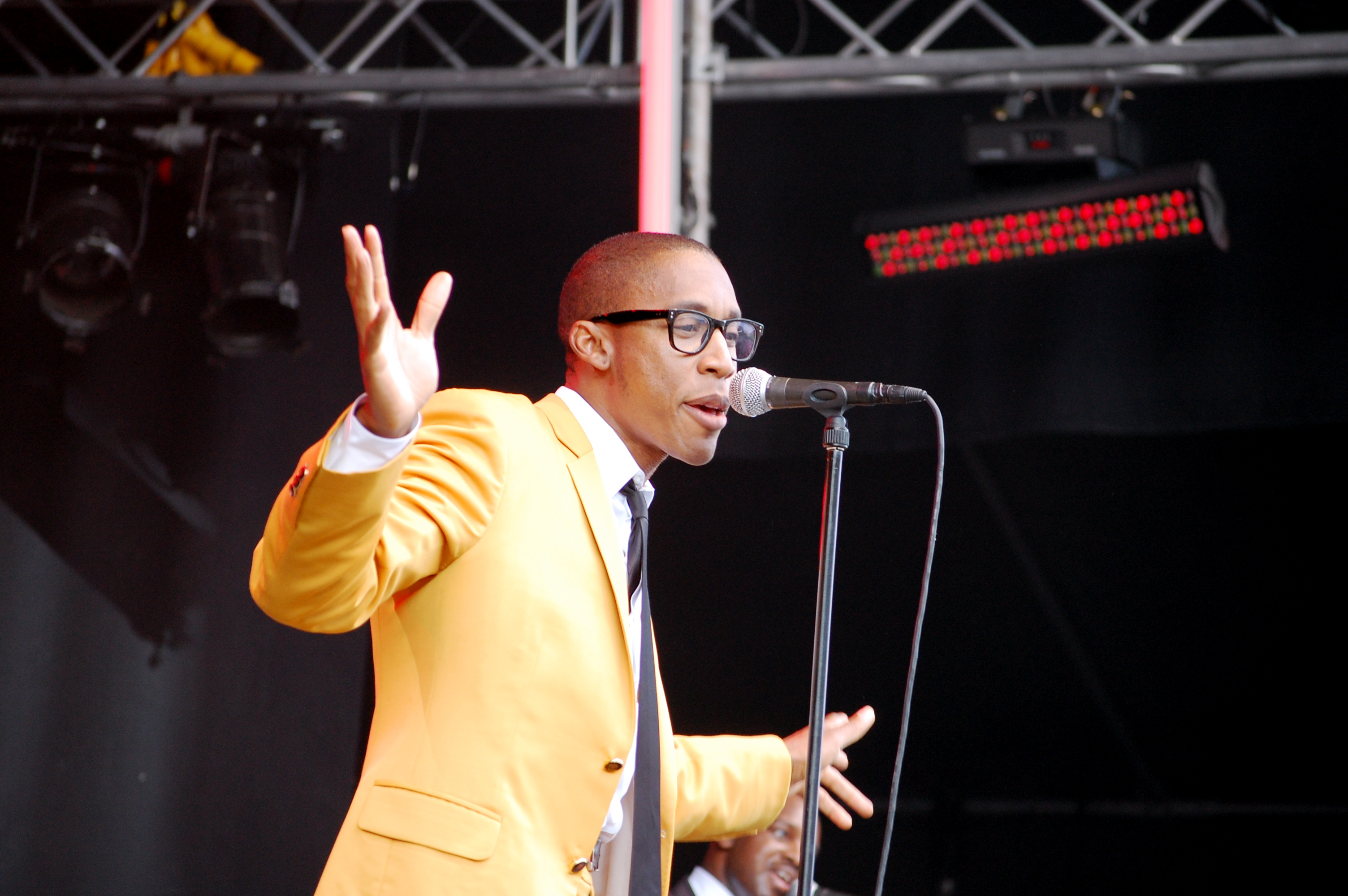
Saadiq performing at the 2009 Stockholm Jazz Festival, promoting The Way I See It.

Touring with a nine-piece band, Saadiq hit the 2009 summer music festival circuit with performances at Bonnaroo, Hollywood Bowl, Outside Lands, Pori Jazz, Stockholm Jazz Festival, North Sea Jazz, Essence Music Festival, Summer Spirit Festival, and Nice Jazz Festival, Bumbershoot Music Festival and Austin City Limits. Saadiq has been touring Europe extensively, and held a five-night residency at the House of Blues in Tokyo, Japan, in June 2009. In 2008, Saadiq formed a new label called Velma Records, a place where he promises "people can express themselves like I did with The Way I See It... where they can dream something up and just go with it".

He produced songs for LeToya Luckett's forthcoming second album Lady Love, released August 2009. In 2009, Saadiq produced "Please Stay" and "Love Never Changes" for Ledisi's August 2009 release "Turn Me Loose". Saadiq also was the executive producer for an emerging group called Tha Boogie. Tha Boogie's first EP was released on iTunes and is titled Love Tha Boogie, Vol. 1 (Steal This Sh*t).

==== Video game development and new music ====
In 2009, Saadiq announced his video game development company called IllFonic. The first video game in development by IllFonic was Ghetto Golf, with an expected release late in 2010. It was later cancelled. Several other titles have followed.

In 2009, Saadiq teamed up Bentley Kyle Evans, Jeff Franklin, Martin Lawrence, and Trenten Gumbs to create a new sitcom called Love That Girl! starring Tatyana Ali. Raphael is an executive producer and composer for Love That Girl! The show airs on TV One and debuted on January 19, 2010. That same year, Saadiq performed The Spinners hit "It's A Shame" in a legendary Levi's commercial and sang as part of the chorus in the 2010 remake of "We Are the World" for Haiti.

=== 2011–present: Stone Rollin', Jimmy Lee and Beyoncé ===
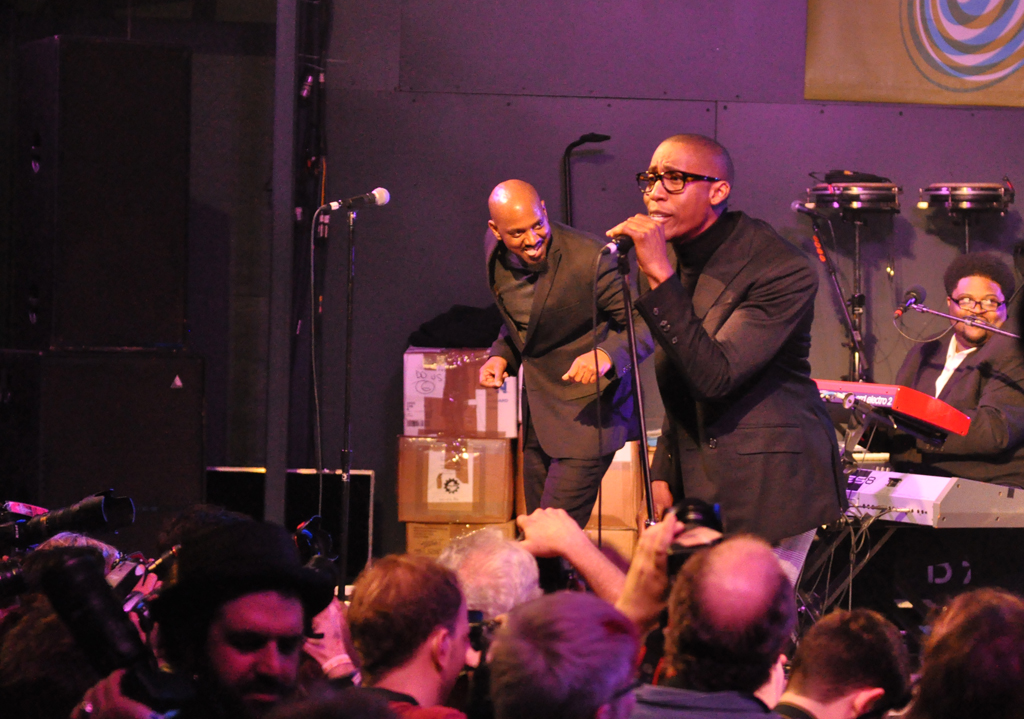
Saadiq performing at South by Southwest in 2011, promoting Stone Rollin'.

In 2011, Saadiq was the guitarist/bandleader for the group backing Mick Jagger for Jagger's tribute performance of the Solomon Burke R&B classic, "Everybody Needs Somebody to Love" at the 53rd Grammy Awards in Los Angeles and on CBS. The band that accompanied the performance was Saadiq's touring band called Stone Rollin. In 2011 he and his band performed as the ESPY's house band for the night, where he performed his latest compositions.

Saadiq's 2011 album Stone Rollin' was released to great critical acclaim. "He's always had a boyish enthusiasm for performing, and a flexible, naturally joyous voice that suggests a young Stevie Wonder," wrote Greg Kot of the Chicago Tribune, "but with his latest album, Saadiq finds a new gear. The album and his current tour demonstrate that there's a big difference between retro and classic, and the artist consistently finds himself on the right side of that divide." Kot ranked the album number seven in his year-end list, in which he dubbed it Saadiq's "finest achievement" and stated, "He's always written songs steeped in soul and R&B, but now he gives them a progressive edge with roaming bass lines and haunted keyboard textures. He's no longer a retro stylist – he's writing new classics." Critic Jim Derogatis called it "a stone cold gas of a party disc."

In the fall of 2011, he performed on the fourth results show of Dancing with the Stars season 13. In December 2011, he performed a cover compilation of several Neil Diamond songs at the Kennedy Center Honors award ceremony.

In 2012 he signed a deal with Toyota to do a TV commercial for the Toyota Prius. In 2013 Raphael partnered with Bay Area/ Atlanta Production company EL Seven Entertainment/ Republic Records and then-new R&B singer Adrian Marcel and released his first promotional mixtape Raphael Saadiq Presents Adrian Marcel 7 Days of Weak.

Saadiq is a featured bass guitar player on Elton John's 2013 album, The Diving Board.

In 2016 he executive produced Solange Knowles' album, A Seat at the Table, which debuted at number one on the Billboard 200 and the Top R&B/Hip-Hop Albums chart in the United States. He also guest starred in Luke Cage, where he performs his songs "Good Man" and "Angel" at Harlem's Paradise.

In 2017 he appeared in the award-winning documentary film The American Epic Sessions, directed by Bernard MacMahon, where he recorded the Memphis Jug Band's 1928 song "Stealin' Stealin'". live on the restored first electrical sound recording system from the 1920s. Of recording on the system he said, "it's amazing to just look at how it's built, you know just look at the machine itself. It just has this like magical sound the way that it's built. It's true. It's just the truest sound you could ever get".

In 2017, Saadiq collaborated with Mary J. Blige as a songwriter for the movie Mudbound (2017), for which they both received Academy Award nominations for Best Original Song.

In 2018, he produced the John Legend holiday themed album, A Legendary Christmas.

On August 23, 2019, Saadiq released his fifth album Jimmy Lee, to critical acclaim.

During the COVID-19 pandemic, he released a song on his website called "Rony! Roni! Roné!", as a nod to his group "Tony! Toni! Toné!".

In 2022, Saadiq collaborated on multiple songs from Brent Faiyaz's album Wasteland, which debuted at number two on the Billboard 200 chart. Saadiq also collaborated with Beyoncé on her seventh and eighth studio albums Renaissance, for which he received two Grammy award nominations, and 2024's Cowboy Carter, for which he was nominated for four Grammys, winning Album of the Year as a songwriter.

== Equipment ==
Through the course of his career, Saadiq has often played Fender Telecaster and Stratocaster electric guitars.

=== Signature guitar ===
In 2024, Fender announced a collaboration with Saadiq to produce a signature guitar model he designed to be available for purchase. The limited edition Raphael Saadiq Telecaster features a Dark Red Metallic finish, black binding, black headstock, custom acrylic pickguard, and custom Raphael Saadiq single-coil pickups. The model was designed with help from fellow musician Eric Gales, and aesthetically inspired by Saadiq's debut album, Instant Vintage.

== Discography ==
=== Solo albums ===
- Instant Vintage (2002)
- Ray Ray (2004)
- The Way I See It (2008)
- Stone Rollin' (2011)
- Jimmy Lee (2019)

=== With Tony! Toni! Toné! ===
- Who? (1988)
- The Revival (1990)
- Sons of Soul (1993)
- House of Music (1996)

=== With Lucy Pearl ===
- Lucy Pearl (2000)

=== Singles ===
- "Ask of You" (1995)
- "Can't Get Enough" (Duet with Willie Max, 1998)
- "Get Involved" (Duet with Q-Tip, 1999)
- "Be Here" (Duet with D'Angelo, 2002)
- "Still Ray" (2002)
- "Love That Girl" (2008)
- "Never Give You Up" (With Stevie Wonder & CJ Hilton, 2009)
- "100 Yard Dash" (2009)
- "Staying In Love" (2009)
- "Something Keeps Calling" (2019)

=== Guest vocals ===
Title	Year	Artist	Album
"Midnight"	1993	A Tribe Called Quest	Midnight Marauders
"Stressed Out (Remix)"	1996	ATCQ, Faith Evans	—N/a
"What They Do"	1996	The Roots	Illadelph Halflife
"Jus Mee & U"	1997	Luniz	Lunitik Muzik
"Something Bout Yo Bidness"	1999	Snoop Dogg	No Limit Top Dogg
"Well"	2000	DJ Quik	Balance & Options
"Just a Man"	2001	—N/a	Baby Boy soundtrack
"Just a Man"	2002	Devin the Dude	Just Tryin' ta Live
"Leave This Morning"	2003	Nappy Roots	Wooden Leather
"Glow"	2003	Kelis	Tasty
"Take Me"	2004	Teedra Moses	Complex Simplicity
"Harvest for the World"	2004	Kelvin Wooton	Isley Brothers: Taken to the Next Phase
"Ask of You"	2005	Mashonda	January Joy
"I Found My Everything"	2005	Mary J. Blige	The Breakthrough
"Walk These Streets"	2005	Warren G	In the Mid-Nite Hour
"Show Me the Way"	2005	Earth, Wind and Fire	Illumination
"Coming Home"	2005	Bizarre	Hannicap Circus
"We Get Down"	2006	Hi-Tek, Mos Def, Bootsy Collins	Hi-Teknology²: The Chip
"Waste of Time"	2008	Snoop Dogg	Ego Trippin'
"Show You the World"	2008	The Grouch	Show You the World
"We Fight/We Love"	2008	Q-Tip	The Renaissance
"What Dudes Do"	2009	Chali 2na	Fish Outta Water
"Without You"	2009	Dwele	Dwele
"All the Money in the World"	2010	Rick Ross	Teflon Don
"Heart Attack"	2011	—N/a	Abduction (OST)
"Balmain Jeans"	2014	Kid Cudi	KiD CuDi presents SATELLITE FLIGHT: The journey to Mother Moon
"Soul Food"	2014	Big K.R.I.T.	Cadillactica
"Gonna Miss You"	2016	Rapsody	Crown
"Hero"	2016	Dame D.O.L.L.A.	The Letter O
"Apple of My Eye"	2017	Rick Ross	Rather You Than Me
"Bullets in the Street and Blood"	2017	Cody Chestnutt	My Love Divine Degree
"Soul Sista Remix"	2019	Bilal	Queen & Slim (soundtrack)
"If It's Good"	2020	—N/a	Insecure: Season 4
"The Sun"	2020	KYLE, Bryson Tiller	See You When I Am Famous
"Season Ticket Holder"	2020	Rick Ross, D. Wade, Wale	—N/a
"GOAT Spirit"	2021	Dame D.O.L.L.A.	Different on Levels the LORD Allowed
"No Wish"	2023	Black Milk, Phonte	Everybody Good?
"Crash"	2025	No ID, Saba, Kelly Rowland	From the Private Collection

== Awards and nominations ==
=== Academy Awards ===
Year	Category	Nominated work	Result	Ref.
2017	Best Original Song	"Mighty River" (from Mudbound)	Nominated	
2025	Best Original Song	"I Lied to You" (from Sinners)	Nominated	

=== BET Awards ===
Year	Category	Nominated work	Result	Ref.
2009	BET Centric Award	—N/a	Nominated	

=== Emmy Awards ===
Year	Category	Nominated work	Result	Ref.
Primetime Emmy Awards
2021	Outstanding Music Composition for a Series (Original Dramatic Score)	Lovecraft Country (Episode: "Rewind 1921")	Nominated	
2026	Outstanding Music Composition for a Documentary Series or Special (Original Dramatic Score)	High Horse: The Black Cowboy (Episode: "F*ck Westerns")	Nominated	

=== Golden Globe Awards ===
Year	Category	Nominated work	Result	Ref.
2017	Best Original Song	"Mighty River" (from Mudbound)	Nominated	
2020	Best Original Song	"Tigress & Tweed" (from The United States vs. Billie Holiday)	Nominated	
2025	Best Original Song	"I Lied to You" (from Sinners)	Nominated	

=== Grammy Awards ===
Year	Category	Nominated work	Result	Ref.
1994	Best R&B Performance by a Duo or Group with Vocal	"Anniversary"	Nominated	
1994	Best Rhythm & Blues Song	"Anniversary"	Nominated	
2001	Best R&B Performance by a Duo or Group with Vocal	"Dance Tonight"	Nominated	
2001	Best R&B Song	"Untitled (How Does It Feel)"	Nominated	
2003	Best Urban/Alternative Performance	"Be Here" (with D'Angelo)	Nominated	
2003	Best R&B Song	"Be Here" (with D'Angelo)	Nominated	
2003	Best R&B Song	"Love of My Life (An Ode to Hip-Hop)"	Won	
2003	Best Song Written for a Motion Picture, Television or Other Visual Media	"Love of My Life (An Ode to Hip-Hop)"	Nominated	
2003	Best R&B Album	Instant Vintage	Nominated	
2005	Best R&B Performance by a Duo or Group with Vocals	"Show Me the Way" (with Earth, Wind & Fire)	Nominated	
2007	Best Traditional R&B Performance	"I Found My Everything" (with Mary J. Blige)	Nominated	
2009	Best R&B Performance by a Duo or Group with Vocals	"Never Give You Up" (featuring Stevie Wonder and CJ Hilton)	Nominated	
2009	Best R&B Album	The Way I See It	Nominated	
2009	Best Traditional R&B Performance	"Love That Girl"	Nominated	
2012	Best Traditional R&B Performance	"Good Man"	Nominated	
2021	Album of the Year	Donda	Nominated	
2023	Album of the Year	Renaissance	Nominated	
2023	Best R&B Song	"Cuff It"	Won	
2025	Album of the Year	Cowboy Carter	Won	
2025	Record of the Year	"Texas Hold 'Em"	Nominated	
2025	Song of the Year	"Texas Hold 'Em"	Nominated	
2025	Best Country Song	"Texas Hold 'Em"	Nominated	
2026	Best Song Written for Visual Media	"I Lied to You" (from Sinners: Original Motion Picture Soundtrack)	Nominated	

=== Soul Train Music Awards ===
Year	Category	Nominated work	Result	Ref.
2009	Best Male R&B/Soul Artist	—N/a	Nominated	
2011	Centric Award	—N/a	Won	
2016	The Ashford & Simpson Songwriter's Award	"Cranes in the Sky"	Won	
