= Stockholm Jazz Festival =

- Genre: Jazz, free improvisation, world music
- Dates: October
- Location(s): Stockholm, Sweden
- Coordinates: 59°19′46″N 18°4′7″E
- Years active: 1980–present
- Attendance: 21,000
- Website: Official site

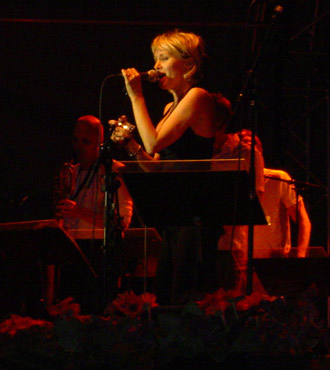
Louise Hoffsten at the Stockholm Jazz Festival in 2003

Stockholm Jazz Festival is an annual music festival that was established in 1980 in Stockholm, Sweden, originally called the Stockholm Jazz and Blues Festival. A portion of the first festival was broadcast on Swedish television.

== Overview ==
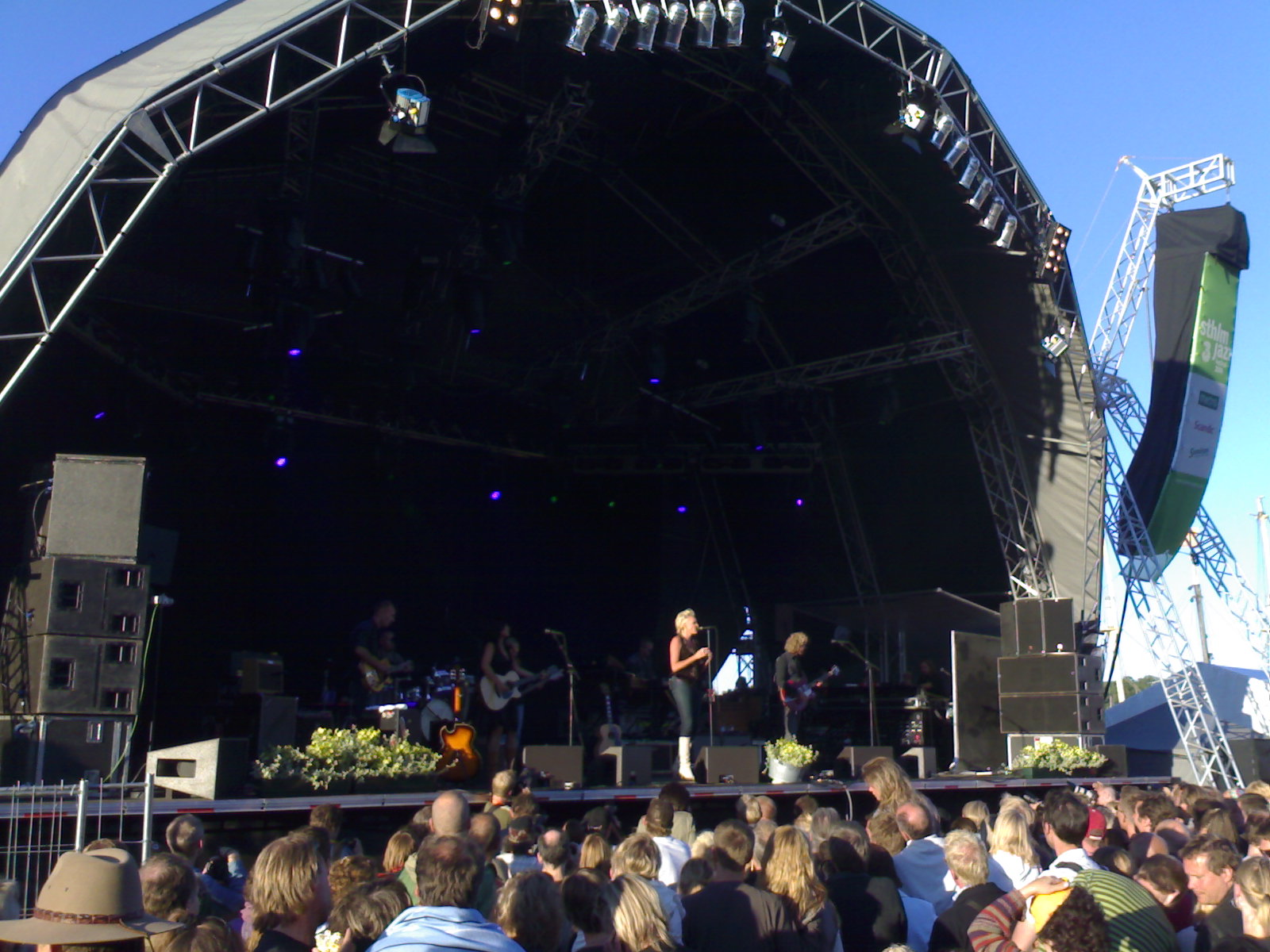
Eva Dahlgren on stage at Skeppsholmen in 2006

Claiming to be one of the oldest festivals in Sweden, the Stockholm Jazz Festival celebrated its 20th birthday in 2003, refusing to give up its main venue on Skeppsholmen since long having a status as the soul of the festival, the backdrop of the Stockholm harbor regarded as the distinguishing mark of the festival.

The festival has hosted Swedish musicians such as Arne Domnérus, Monica Zetterlund, Nils Landgren, Peps Persson, and Lisa Ekdahl, in addition to Pepper Adams, Count Basie, B.B. King, Stan Getz, Dizzy Gillespie, and Miriam Makeba.

For the festival of 2007, a national project called Jazzens år 2007 ("Year of Jazz 2007") was started.

The festival is housed indoors since 2012 and in 2014 expanded to 10 full days with attendance exceeding 21,000.

The festival emphasizes world music and improvisational music. In October 2016 acts from around the world included Kristin Amparo, Peter Asplund, Dee Dee Bridgewater, Tony Buck, Avishai Cohen, Fatoumata Diawara, Itamar Doari, Tia Fuller, Steve Gadd, Abdullah Ibrahim, Magnus Lindgren, Hailu Mergia, Roscoe Mitchell, Omri Moealso, Lina Nyberg, Cecilia Persson, Alfredo Rodriguez, and Archie Shepp. Venues ranged from small clubs to concert halls.

Past venues have included Glenn Miller Café, Stockholm Concert Hall, Fasching, Skeppsholmen, Scandic Anglais, Kungsträdgården, Moderna Museet.
