= Noel Gourdin =

American singer (born 1981)

- Born: March 14, 1981 (age 45); Brockton, Massachusetts
- Genres: R&B
- Occupation: Singer
- Instrument: Vocals
- Years active: 2007–present
- Labels: Epic Records, E1 Music, Shanachie Records
- Website: Noel Gourdin's website

Noel Gourdin (born March 14, 1981), is a singer and an R&B artist from Boston, Massachusetts. He is most known for his song called "The River", which appeared on the Billboard charts.

== Discography ==
=== Albums ===
Information
After My Time
- Released: July 22, 2008
- Chart positions: 36
- U.S. sales:
- RIAA Certification: N/A
- Singles: "The River"
Fresh: The Definition
- Released: April 12, 2011
- Chart positions:
- U.S. sales:
- RIAA Certification:
- Singles "Beautiful" "The River", "Not Around"
City Heart, Southern Soul
- Released: January 28, 2014
- Chart positions:
- U.S. sales:
- RIAA Certification:
- Singles: "Foxxxy", "Heaven Knows"

=== Singles ===
Year	Title	Chart Positions		Album
Year	Title	US Adult R&B	US R&B	Album
2008	"The River"	1	21	After My Time
2011	"Beautiful"^{A}		53	Fresh: The Definition

^{A}Current single.
