= Joss Stone discography =

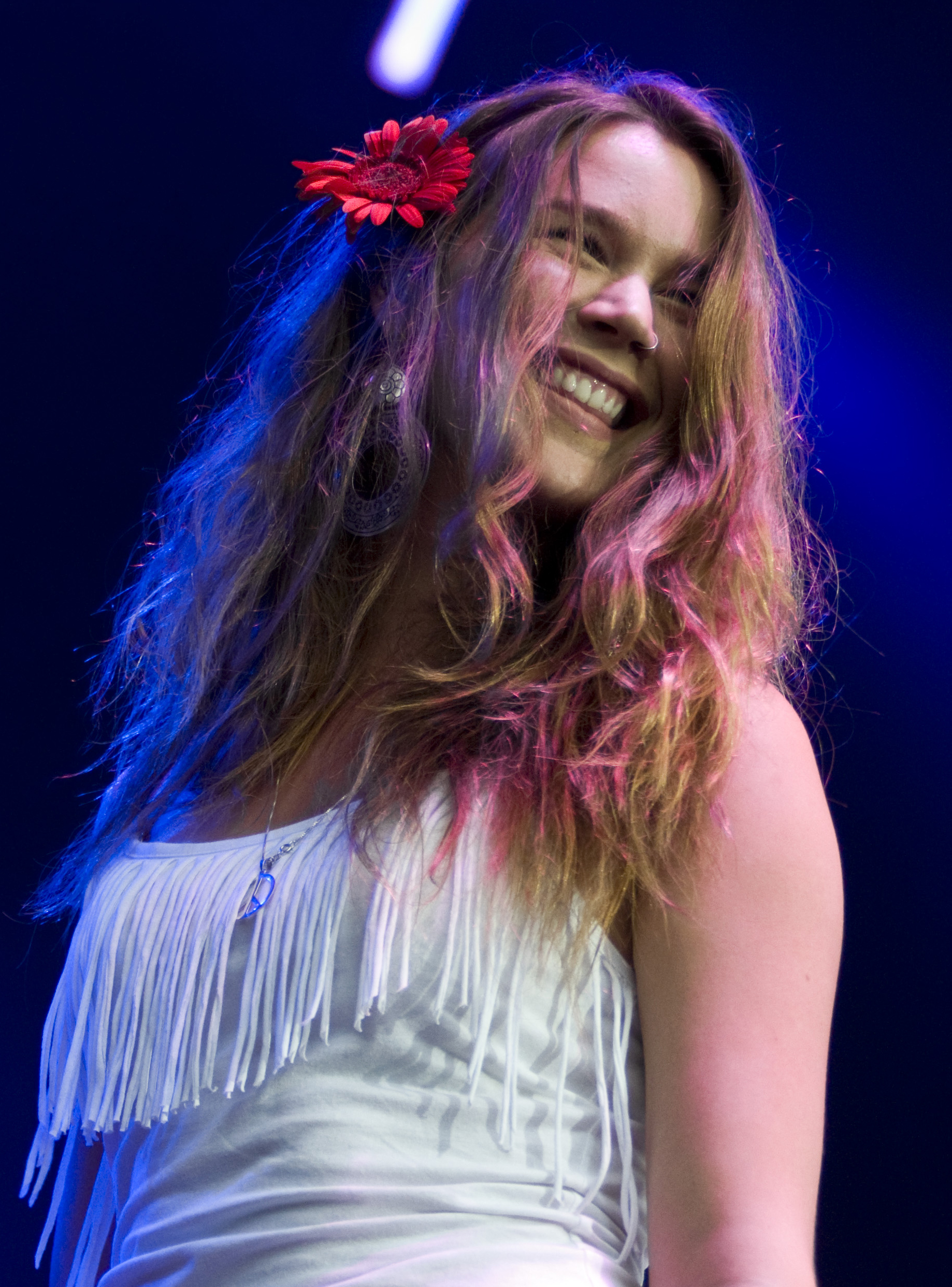
- Stone performing at Stockholm Jazz Festival in July 2009
- Studio albums: 9
- Extended plays: 3
- Compilation albums: 1
- Singles: 47
- Video albums: 1
- Music videos: 32
- Promotional singles: 5

English singer Joss Stone has released nine studio albums, one compilation album, three extended plays, 47 singles (including 16 as a featured artist), five promotional singles, one video album and 21 music videos. As of May 2015, Stone had sold more than 14 million albums worldwide.

Stone's debut studio album, The Soul Sessions, was released in September 2003, consisting mostly of cover versions of soul songs from the 1960s and 1970s. The album peaked at number four on the UK Albums Chart and was later certified triple platinum by the British Phonographic Industry (BPI). It produced the singles "Fell in Love with a Boy" and "Super Duper Love", both of which peaked at number 18 on the UK Singles Chart. The Soul Sessions has sold five million copies worldwide.

In September 2004, Stone released her second studio album and her first of original material, Mind Body & Soul. It debuted at number one on the UK Albums Chart, making Stone the youngest female solo artist to top the chart. The album spawned four singles, including "You Had Me", which reached number nine on the UK Singles Chart and became Stone's highest-peaking single on the chart to date. Like its predecessor, Mind Body & Soul was certified triple platinum by the BPI.

Stone's third studio album, Introducing Joss Stone, was released in March 2007. It failed to match the commercial success of Stone's previous albums in her native United Kingdom, reaching number 12 on the UK Albums Chart and being certified silver by the BPI. Nevertheless, the album debuted at number two on the Billboard 200 in the United States, becoming the highest-charting debut by a British female solo artist on the chart in the Nielsen SoundScan era at the time.

Following a highly publicised battle with EMI, Stone released her fourth studio album, Colour Me Free!, in October 2009. It reached number 75 on the UK Albums Chart, her lowest-peaking album to date. After parting ways with EMI in 2010, Stone launched her own record label, Stone'd Records, and released her fifth studio album, LP1, in July 2011, in partnership with independent label Surfdog Records. Stone also joined Mick Jagger, Dave Stewart, A. R. Rahman and Damian Marley to form the supergroup SuperHeavy, who released their eponymous debut album in September 2011. Later that month, EMI released her first compilation album, The Best of Joss Stone 2003–2009. In July 2012, Stone released her sixth studio album, The Soul Sessions Vol. 2, a follow-up to The Soul Sessions that also consists of cover versions of classic soul songs. The album peaked at number six on the UK Albums Chart, earning Stone her first top-10 album since Mind Body & Soul.

== Albums ==
=== Studio albums ===
List of studio albums, with selected chart positions, sales figures and certifications
Title	Details	Peak chart positions										Sales	Certifications
Title	Details	UK	AUS	AUT	BEL (FL)	CAN	FRA	GER	NLD	SWI	US	Sales	Certifications
The Soul Sessions	Released: 16 September 2003; Label: S-Curve; Formats: CD, LP, digital download	4	16	4	7	19	23	4	4	14	39	WW: 5,000,000; UK: 1,075,492; US: 981,000	BPI: 3× Platinum; ARIA: Platinum; BEA: Platinum; BVMI: Gold; IFPI AUT: Platinum; IFPI SWI: Gold; MC: Platinum; NVPI: Platinum; RIAA: Gold; SNEP: Gold
Mind Body & Soul	Released: 15 September 2004; Label: S-Curve; Formats: CD, LP, digital download	1	7	5	3	13	9	7	3	6	11	UK: 940,617; US: 1,300,000	BPI: 3× Platinum; ARIA: Gold; BVMI: Platinum; IFPI AUT: Platinum; IFPI SWI: Gold; NVPI: Platinum; RIAA: Platinum
Introducing Joss Stone	Released: 9 March 2007; Label: Virgin; Formats: CD, LP, digital download	12	15	8	5	6	22	6	1	2	2	WW: 1,300,000; US: 652,000	BPI: Silver; BVMI: Gold; IFPI AUT: Gold; IFPI SWI: Platinum; MC: Gold; RIAA: Gold
Colour Me Free!	Released: 20 October 2009; Label: Virgin; Formats: CD, digital download	75	— (Note: Colour Me Free! did not enter the Australian Albums Chart, but peaked at number 36 on the Australian Digital Albums Chart.)	17	50	26	63	26	16	5	10	UK: 14,071; US: 93,000	
LP1	Released: 21 July 2011; Label: Stone'd, Surfdog; Formats: CD, LP, digital download	36	58	15	12	15	46	5	6	2	9		
The Soul Sessions Vol. 2	Released: 20 July 2012; Label: S-Curve, Stone'd; Formats: CD, LP, digital download	6	42	6	25	23	82	7	2	5	10	US: 70,000	
Water for Your Soul	Released: 31 July 2015; Label: Stone'd; Formats: CD, LP, digital download	13	—	13	27	25	77	11	3	1	34		
Never Forget My Love	Released: 11 February 2022; Label: Bay Street; Formats: CD, LP, digital download	— (Note: Never Forget My Love did not enter the UK Albums Chart, but peaked at number 20 on the UK Album Downloads Chart.)	—	—	—	—	—	—	—	16	—		
Merry Christmas, Love	Released: 30 September 2022; Label: S-Curve; Formats: CD, LP, digital download	—	—	—	—	—	—	—	—	—	—		
"—" denotes a recording that did not chart or was not released in that territory.

=== Compilation albums ===
List of compilation albums, with selected chart positions
Title	Details	Peak chart positions		
Title	Details	AUT	ITA	SWI
The Best of Joss Stone 2003–2009	Released: 23 September 2011; Label: Virgin; Formats: CD, digital download	58	98	57

== Extended plays ==
List of extended plays, with selected chart positions
Title	Details	Peaks
Title	Details	UK
Sessions@AOL	Released: 30 November 2004; Label: S-Curve; Format: Digital download	—
Live Session EP (iTunes Exclusive)	Released: 15 May 2007; Label: Virgin; Format: Digital download	200
Live at Austin City Limits Music Festival 2007	Released: 6 November 2007; Label: Virgin; Format: Digital download	—
"—" denotes a recording that did not chart or was not released in that territory.

== Singles ==
=== As lead artist ===
List of singles as lead artist, with selected chart positions, showing year released and album name
Title	Year	Peak chart positions										Album
Title	Year	UK	AUS	AUT	CAN	GER	IRE	NLD	NZ	SWI	US	Album
"Fell in Love with a Boy"	2004	18	—	—	—	—	46	80	23	—	—	The Soul Sessions
"Super Duper Love"	2004	18	—	—	—	78	—	—	—	—	—	The Soul Sessions
"You Had Me"	2004	9	23	54	29	77	34	14	26	40	—	Mind Body & Soul
"Right to Be Wrong"	2004	29	66	—	—	—	—	31	—	46	—	Mind Body & Soul
"Spoiled"	2005	32	—	—	—	—	—	46	—	—	—	Mind Body & Soul
"Cry Baby/Piece of My Heart" (with Melissa Etheridge)	2005	—	—	—	—	—	—	—	—	—	32	Non-album single
"Don't Cha Wanna Ride"	2005	20	—	—	—	100	—	54	—	93	—	Mind Body & Soul
"Tell Me 'bout It"	2007	28	—	60	—	64	—	5	—	33	83	Introducing Joss Stone
"Tell Me What We're Gonna Do Now" (featuring Common)	2007	84	—	—	53	96	—	36	—	66	—	Introducing Joss Stone
"L-O-V-E"	2007	100	—	—	—	—	—	—	—	75	—	Non-album singles
"All I Want for Christmas"	2007	—	—	—	—	—	—	—	—	—	—	Non-album singles
"Baby Baby Baby"	2007	—	—	—	—	—	—	—	—	—	—	Introducing Joss Stone
"Free Me"	2009	—	—	—	—	—	—	—	—	50	—	Colour Me Free!
"Stand Up to Cancer" (with Dave Stewart)	2010	—	—	—	—	—	—	—	—	—	—	Non-album singles
"Back in Style"	2011	—	—	—	—	—	—	—	—	—	—	Non-album singles
"Somehow"	2011	—	—	—	—	—	—	—	—	—	—	LP1
"Karma"	2011	—	—	—	—	—	—	—	—	—	—	LP1
"Don't Start Lying to Me Now"	2011	—	—	—	—	—	—	—	—	—	—	LP1
"While You're Out Looking for Sugar"	2012	—	—	—	—	—	—	—	—	—	—	The Soul Sessions Vol. 2
"Take Good Care" (with Dave Stewart)	2012	—	—	—	—	—	—	—	—	—	—	Non-album single
"Pillow Talk"	2012	—	—	—	—	—	—	—	—	—	—	The Soul Sessions Vol. 2
"Teardrops"	2013	—	—	—	—	—	—	—	—	—	—	The Soul Sessions Vol. 2
"No Man's Land (Green Fields of France)" (featuring Jeff Beck)	2014	49	—	—	—	—	—	—	—	—	—	Non-album single
"Stuck on You"	2015	—	—	—	—	—	—	—	—	—	—	Water for Your Soul
"The Answer"	2015	—	—	—	—	—	—	—	—	—	—	Water for Your Soul
"Molly Town"	2015	—	—	—	—	—	—	—	—	—	—	Water for Your Soul
"Free Me 2017"	2017	—	—	—	—	—	—	—	—	—	—	Non-album singles
"Oceans"	2017	—	—	—	—	—	—	—	—	—	—	Non-album singles
"Walk with Me"	2020	—	—	—	—	—	—	—	—	—	—	Non-album singles
"Never Forget My Love"	2021	—	—	—	—	—	—	—	—	—	—	Never Forget My Love
"Breaking Each Other's Hearts"	2021	—	—	—	—	—	—	—	—	—	—	Never Forget My Love
"Oh to Be Loved by You"	2022	—	—	—	—	—	—	—	—	—	—	Never Forget My Love
"What Christmas Means to Me"	2022	—	—	—	—	—	—	—	— (Note: "What Christmas Means to Me" did not enter the NZ Top 40 Singles Chart, but peaked at number 23 on the NZ Hot Singles Chart.)	—	—	Merry Christmas, Love
"Golden" (with Change + Check Choir)	2023	— (Note: "Golden" did not enter the UK Singles Chart, but peaked at number three on the UK Singles Sales Chart.)		—	—	—	—	—	—	—	—	Non-album singles
"Loving You"	2024	—		—	—	—	—	—	—	—	—	Non-album singles
"No Thankyou"	2025	—		—	—	—	—	—	—	—	—	Non-album singles
"—" denotes a recording that did not chart or was not released in that territory.

=== As featured artist ===
List of singles as featured artist, with selected chart positions, showing year released and album name
Title	Year	Peak chart positions										Album
Title	Year	UK	AUS	FRA	GER	IRE	ITA	NLD	NOR	SWI	US	Album
"Do They Know It's Christmas?" (as part of Band Aid 20)	2004	1	9	72	7	1	1	3	1	7	—	Non-album single
"Come Together Now" (with various artists)	2005	—	—	—	—	—	—	—	—	—	— (Note: "Come Together Now" did not enter the Billboard Hot 100, but peaked at number 13 on the Hot Singles Sales chart.)	Hurricane Relief: Come Together Now
"Cry Baby Cry" (Santana featuring Sean Paul and Joss Stone)	2006	71	—	142	47	—	19	63	—	29	—	All That I Am
"Sing" (Annie Lennox featuring various artists)	2007	161	—	—	—	—	—	—	—	—	—	Songs of Mass Destruction
"Tip of My Tongue" (Something Sally featuring Joss Stone)	2008	—	—	—	—	—	—	—	18	—	—	Familiar Strangers
"You're the One for Me" (Smokey Robinson featuring Joss Stone)	2009	—	—	—	—	—	—	—	—	—	—	Time Flies When You're Having Fun
"I Put a Spell on You" (Jeff Beck featuring Joss Stone)	2010	—	—	—	72	—	—	—	—	—	—	Emotion & Commotion
"The Best Thing About Me Is You" (Ricky Martin featuring Joss Stone)	2010	—	—	—	—	—	—	99	—	—	74	Música + Alma + Sexo
"Mrs #1" (Yes Sir Boss featuring Joss Stone)	2013	—	—	—	—	—	—	—	—	—	—	Desperation State
"Keep the Light On" (Nitin Sawhney featuring Joss Stone)	2016	—	—	—	—	—	—	—	—	—	—	Dystopian Dream
"Someday We'll Be Together" (Lemar featuring Joss Stone)	2016	—	—	—	—	—	—	—	—	—	—	The Letter
"Evergreen" (Shaun Escoffery featuring Joss Stone)	2016	—	—	—	—	—	—	—	—	—	—	Evergreen
"Take You Home" (Lack of Afro featuring Joss Stone)	2016	—	—	—	—	—	—	—	—	—	—	Hello Baby
"This Time" (Mike Andersen featuring Joss Stone)	2016	—	—	—	—	—	—	—	—	—	—	Devil Is Back
"My Love Goes On" (James Morrison featuring Joss Stone)	2019	—	—	—	—	—	—	—	—	—	—	You're Stronger Than You Know
"Lean on Me" (NHS Relief featuring Beverley Knight, Joss Stone, Omar and The Collective)	2020	—	—	—	—	—	—	—	—	—	—	Non-album singles
"Bring On The Rain" (The Shapeshifters featuring Joss Stone)	2022	—	—	—	—	—	—	—	—	—	—	Non-album singles
"I Never Miss Him Anymore" (Jessie James Decker featuring Joss Stone)	2025	—	—	—	—	—	—	—	—	—	—	Non-album singles
"Slow Lightning" (Conner Reeves featuring Joss Stone)	2026	—	—	—	—	—	—	—	—	—	—	Non-album singles
"—" denotes a recording that did not chart or was not released in that territory.

=== Promotional singles ===
List of promotional singles, with selected chart positions, showing year released and album name
Title	Year	Peaks	Album
Title	Year	NL Tip	Album
"Lonely Without You (This Christmas)" (with Mick Jagger)	2004	20	Alfie
"Family Affair" (Sly and the Family Stone with Joss Stone and John Legend with Van Hunt)	2006	—	Different Strokes by Different Folks
"Gimme Shelter" (Angélique Kidjo featuring Joss Stone)	2007	—	Djin Djin
"Parallel Lines"	2009	—	Colour Me Free!
"Letting Me Down" (with Jools Holland & the Rhythm & Blues Orchestra)	2015	—	Sirens of Song
"Bring on Christmas Day"	2022	—	Merry Christmas, Love
"—" denotes a recording that did not chart or was not released in that territory.

== Other charted songs ==
List of other charted songs, with selected chart positions, showing year released and album name
Title	Year	Peaks	Album
Title	Year	UK	Album
"Calling It Christmas" (with Elton John)	2007	123	Elton John's Christmas Party

== Guest appearances ==
List of non-single guest appearances, with other performing artists, showing year released and album name
Title	Year	Other artist(s)	Album
"Issues"	2004	Mr. G, Christie Beu	Issues
"Wicked Time"	2004	Nadirah "Nadz" Seid	Alfie
"Alfie"	2004	None	Alfie
"What Ever Happened to the Heroes"	2005	None	Fantastic 4: The Album
"Under Pressure"	2005	None	Killer Queen: A Tribute to Queen
"When Love Comes to Town"	2005	Herbie Hancock, Jonny Lang	Possibilities
"Love Sneakin' Up On You"	2005	Les Paul, Sting	American Made World Played
"Treat Me Right (I'm Yours for Life)"	2005	None	Music from and Inspired by Desperate Housewives
"Stir It Up"	2005	Patti LaBelle	Chicken Little
"Calling It Christmas"	2005	Elton John	Elton John's Christmas Party
"Erica"	2006	Dead Celebrity Status	Blood Music
"Anniversary"	2006	Lemar	The Truth About Love
"I Can't Believe That You're in Love with Me"	2007	Dean Martin	Forever Cool
"Every Night About This Time"	2007	Dirty Dozen Brass Band, Buddy Guy	Goin' Home: A Tribute to Fats Domino
"Just Walk On By"	2008	None	Randy Jackson's Music Club, Vol. 1
"How Can You Mend a Broken Heart"	2008	Al Green	Sex and the City: Original Motion Picture Soundtrack
"I Believe to My Soul"	2008	David Sanborn	Here & Gone
"Just One Kiss"	2008	Raphael Saadiq	The Way I See It
"Unchained Melody/Les enchaînés"	2008	Johnny Hallyday	Ça ne finira jamais
"Love Has Made You Beautiful"	2008	None	Serve3: The Hard Rock Benefit Album
"This Little Light of Mine"	2009	Buick Audra	Oh Happy Day: An All-Star Music Celebration
"It Takes Two"	2009	Tower of Power	Great American Soulbook
"(Heaven Must Have Sent) Your Precious Love"	2009	Tower of Power	Great American Soulbook
"Stalemate"	2009	Ben's Brother	Battling Giants
"Who's Your Daddy"	2010	Ringo Starr	Y Not
"Let the Good Times Roll"	2010	David Sanborn	Only Everything
"There's No Other Me"	2010	Jeff Beck	Emotion & Commotion
"My Generation"	2010	Nas, Damian Marley, Lil Wayne	Distant Relatives
"The Other Half of Me"	2011	The E Family	Now & Forever
"Whisper in the Wind"	2011	Betty Wright, The Roots	Betty Wright: The Movie
"Eyes on the Prize"	2012	None	Soundtrack for a Revolution
"We Shall Overcome"	2012	Anthony Hamilton, The Blind Boys of Alabama, Mary Mary, John Legend	Soundtrack for a Revolution
"I Got Love"	2012	Dave Stewart	The Ringmaster General
"The Spirit of Man"	2012	Jeff Wayne, Liam Neeson, Maverick Sabre	Jeff Wayne's Musical Version of The War of the Worlds – The New Generation
"Bei Mir Bist Du Schön"	2012	Jools Holland & His Rhythm & Blues Orchestra	The Golden Age of Song
"I Ask You"	2013	Nitin Sawhney	OneZero
"The Spirit of Man" (Raggamuffin Mix)	2014	Jeff Wayne, Maverick Sabre	Highlights from Jeff Wayne's Musical Version of The War of the Worlds – The New Generation
"Wild Honey"	2015	Van Morrison	Duets: Re-working the Catalogue
"(Baby) You Got What It Takes"	2015	Buddy Guy	Born to Play Guitar
"Have a Little Faith"	2016	Infamous Stringdusters	Ladies & Gentlemen

== Videography ==
=== Video albums ===
List of video albums, with selected chart positions
Title	Details	Peak chart positions			
Title	Details	UK DVD	AUT DVD	NLD DVD	POR DVD
Mind Body & Soul Sessions: Live in New York City	Released: 13 December 2004; Label: S-Curve; Format: DVD	30	8	4	10

=== Music videos ===
List of music videos, showing year released and directors
Title	Year	Director	Ref(s)
"Fell in Love with a Boy"	2004	Nzingha Stewart	
"Super Duper Love"	2004	David LaChapelle	
"You Had Me"	2004	Chris Robinson	
"Right to Be Wrong"	2005	Liz Friedlander	
"Spoiled"	2005	Joseph Kahn	
"Don't Cha Wanna Ride"	2005	Wayne Isham	
"Tell Me 'bout It"	2007	Bryan Barber	
"Tell Me What We're Gonna Do Now" (featuring Common)	2007	Sanaa Hamri	
"Gimme Shelter" (Angélique Kidjo featuring Joss Stone)	2007	Noble Jones	
"The Anti-Christmas Carol"	2008	Unknown	
"Baby Baby Baby"	2009	Stone's brother	
"Stand Up to Cancer" (with Dave Stewart)	2010	Jesse Dylan	
"Karma"	2011	Unknown	
"While You're Out Looking for Sugar"	2012	Unknown	
"The High Road"	2012	Brian Savelson	
"The Love We Had (Stays on My Mind)"	2013	Anit 'On' Bashar	
"No Man's Land (Green Fields of France)" (featuring Jeff Beck)	2014	Rupert Bryan	
"The Answer"	2015	Joss Stone	
"Stuck on You"	2015	Ugo Splash	
"Oceans"	2017	Unknown	
"This Time" (Mike Andersen featuring Joss Stone)	2018	Sara Koppel	
"My Love Goes On" (James Morrison featuring Joss Stone)	2019	Unknown	
"Lean on Me" (NHS Relief featuring Beverley Knight, Joss Stone, Omar and The Collective)	2020	Dom Lyon	
"Walk with Me"	2020	Unknown	
"Never Forget My Love"	2021	Paul Boyd	
"Breaking Each Other's Hearts"	2021	Brian Totoro	
"Oh To Be Loved By You"	2022	Unknown	
"Bring On The Rain" (The Shapeshifters featuring Joss Stone)	2022	Unknown	
"What Christmas Means to Me"	2022	Unknown	
"Bring on Christmas Day (Live)"	2022	Unknown	
"I Never Miss Him Anymore" (Jessie James Decker featuring Joss Stone)	2025	Luke Hutcherson	
"Slow Lightning" (Conner Reeves featuring Joss Stone)	2026	Unknown	
