= While You're Out Looking for Sugar =

"While You're Out Looking For Sugar"

Single by Joss Stone

from the album The Soul Sessions Vol. 2
- Released: 15 June 2012
- Genre: Soul; R&B
- Length: 3:28
- Label: Stone'd; S-Curve
- Songwriter(s): Ronald Dunbar; Edyth Wayne
- Producer(s): Steve Greenberg; Joss Stone; Steve Greenwell

Joss Stone singles chronology
"Free Me" (2009)	"While You're Out Looking For Sugar" (2012)	"The High Road" (2012)

"While You're Out Looking For Sugar" is a song by Honey Cone and appears on their 1970 album Take Me with You. It was covered by English singer and songwriter Joss Stone from her sixth studio album, The Soul Sessions Vol. 2. The track was released on 15 June 2012, and is marketed as the lead single from the album.

== Music video ==
A music video to accompany the release of "While You're Out Looking For Sugar" was first released onto YouTube on 1 July 2012 at a total length of three minutes and twenty-one seconds.

== Track listing ==
Digital download

1. "While You're Out Looking For Sugar" – 3:17

== Chart performance ==
Chart (2012)	Peak position
Belgium (Ultratip Bubbling Under Flanders)	43
Japan (Japan Hot 100)	51
South Korea International (Circle)	41

== Release history ==
Country	Release date	Format(s)	Label
United Kingdom	15 June 2012	Digital download	Stone'd; S-Curve
