= Water for Your Soul =

2015 studio album by Joss Stone

Studio album by Joss Stone
- Released: 31 July 2015
- Recorded: 2012–2015
- Studios: Home Grown (Devon, England); Titan (London) (Note: Additional recording); Dream Lodge (New York City); Decibel (Hawaii); Lakehouse Recording (Asbury Park, New Jersey); Grip House (New York City); Rhythm Shack (New Orleans); AIR (London)
- Genres: Soul; reggae; R&B; world; hip hop
- Length: 64:10
- Label: Stone'd
- Producers: Joss Stone; Jonathan Shorten; Steve Greenwell

Joss Stone chronology
The Soul Sessions Vol. 2 (2012)	Water for Your Soul (2015)	Never Forget My Love (2022)

Singles from Water for Your Soul
- 1. "Stuck on You" Released: 11 May 2015; 2. "The Answer" Released: 12 June 2015; 3. "Molly Town" Released: 11 September 2015

Water for Your Soul is the seventh studio album by English singer and songwriter Joss Stone, released on 31 July 2015 through her own label, Stone'd Records. It marks her first studio album of original material since LP1 (2011), following the release of the covers album The Soul Sessions Vol. 2 (2012). Musically, it incorporates reggae and hip hop with influences from many different genres, including soul, R&B, world, gospel, Latin and some Indian and Irish influence. The art design was crafted by Irish designer Aoife Hastings, who won a competition launched by Stone through social media which gave fans the opportunity to create her new album cover art. This exposure propelled Aoife's career forward, enabling her to work on renowned brands such as Coca-Cola, Heineken, Diageo, Mondelēz and Pepsi, among many others.

== Background ==
In 2008, Stone launched a legal battle in a bid to leave her record label, EMI, and free her of her current three-album deal with the record label. After EMI delayed the release of Colour Me Free!, originally scheduled for April 2009, the album was ultimately released on 20 October 2009. Stone said that her record company also fought her about the original cover of her new album, calling it "offensive", but by late August 2010, it was reported that Stone had parted ways with EMI. In January 2011, she launched her own independent record label, Stone'd Records.

Stone partnered with Surfdog Records to release her fifth studio album, LP1, on 26 July 2011, through her own label Stone'd Records. Stone also joined the supergroup SuperHeavy which was formed by Mick Jagger of the Rolling Stones, together with Dave Stewart, Damian Marley (the youngest son of Bob Marley) and Indian musician and producer A. R. Rahman. The group's self-titled debut album was released on 20 September 2011 by A&M Records. Additionally, Stone released her sixth studio album, The Soul Sessions Vol. 2, which saw Stone return to her original label, S-Curve Records, who released the album jointly with the singer's Stone'd Records.

== Recording ==
Stone decided to record a reggae album after working with Damian Marley on SuperHeavy in 2011. In an interview with the Official Charts Company, she stated: "Damien actually said to me, 'Joss, you have to do a reggae album!' I'm not crazy enough to know that a reggae album from me would be a very weird thing to do, but the songs we've created are heavily rooted in that sound. That's the style of the album. There's also the Irish fiddles, the Sarod, the tablas, the gospel, flamenco guitar..."

Stone began to work on a new record as soon after launch her sixth album The Soul Sessions Vol. 2. She revealed to the newspaper La Vanguardia in July 2012 that she would work on a reggae album. She stated that it would be recorded and produced by herself and Marley. In March 2014, she elaborated that the new album would be a little bit different and "more eclectic" with a "little bit more hip-hop and reggae".

The sounds and artistry direction of album was adapted and developed through four years that followed until the finished product, even putting songs written by her a long time ago. "The creation of the album has been going on for a while and I certainly had no idea what was getting myself into when I started it. [...] The songs on the album 'Wake Up' and 'Underworld' I wrote ages ago, with no real plan of them going on a record. Then I met Damien Marley when we were working on the Superheavy stuff and we started writing songs in the spare time we had between the sessions. I developed such a strong love for reggae music."

In 2014, Stone also worked with the Urban Folk Quartet members Joe Broughton and Paloma Trigas, who provided string parts for the album. Band member Tom Chapman said how the collaboration began: "Joss watched our gig at Green Man festival last year and came up to chat afterwards. She's really lovely and since then she's stayed in touch and come to see us on tour. When she needed something a little different for the strings on her new record she invited Joe and Paloma down to her studio where they had a great time making music".

== Release and promotion ==
Stone signed deals with three different label services for the album release. The album was released via Stone's own label, Stone'd Records, in conjunction with Essential Music & Marketing in the United Kingdom and Ireland. Kobalt handled distribution in the United States, Canada, Australia, South America, Japan and China, while Membran was in charge for Europe and Africa. Essential's Stuart Meikle said: "Essential are absolutely delighted to be a part of the ongoing development of Joss's musical adventure."

In addition to the album's release, Stone embarked on a proper "world tour" with the intention of playing a gig in every country on the planet. The Total World Tour began on 29 March 2014 in Casablanca, Morocco and concluded on 3 July 2019 in Barcelona, Spain.

== Critical reception ==
Professional ratings
Aggregate scores
Source	Rating
Metacritic	62/100
Review scores
Source	Rating
AllMusic	2.5/5 stars
Billboard	2/5 stars
Boston Globe	8/10 stars
Entertainment Weekly	B
Exclaim!	7/10
The Guardian	3/5 stars
The Independent	2/5 stars
Paste	8.3/10
PopMatters	7/10 stars
Uncut	3/5 stars

Water for Your Soul received generally positive reviews from music critics. At Metacritic, which assigns a normalised rating out of 100 to reviews from mainstream publications, the album received an average score of 62, based on 14 reviews.

At The Guardian, Caroline Sullivan wrote: "the pro-weed track 'Sensimilla' will prompt mass eye-rolling because of her decision to sing part of it in patois, and Harry's Symphony likewise (her accent – 'If you want to get 'igh, bring your own supply' etc. – turns it into Stone's own 'Dreadlock Holiday', which probably wasn't the intention)." Concluding her review on a more positive note, Sullivan suggested: "this album is definitely worth an unbiased listen."

Shaun Connors of Trucking magazine wrote: "Hideous. Stone's previous soulful wailings were bad enough, but this tangential slide into pop-reggae is even worse. Bland and with no sense of genuine style or direction." Concluding a one star out of five review, Connors added: "This 'I'll do what I want release' is suited to no more than beach-bar background music on a Death In Paradise-style Caribbean island."

== Commercial performance ==
Water for Your Soul debuted at number 13 on the UK Albums Chart, selling 4,615 copies in its first week. As of December 2015, the album had sold 29,000 copies in United States, becoming the best-selling current reggae album of 2015 and, so far, the second largest overall.

== Track listing ==
No.	Title	Writer(s)	Length
1.	"Love Me"	Joss Stone; Damian Marley	5:06
2.	"This Ain't Love"	Stone; Jonathan Shorten	4:28
3.	"Stuck on You"	Stone; Shorten	4:18
4.	"Star"	Stone; Shorten	5:07
5.	"Let Me Breathe"	Stone; Shorten; Conner Reeves; Nick Ramm	5:15
6.	"Cut the Line"	Stone; Shorten	4:06
7.	"Wake Up" (featuring Damian Marley)	Stone; Shorten; Marley; Reeves	4:44
8.	"Way Oh"	Stone; Shorten; Marc Cyril; 'Level' Neville Malcolm; Richie Stevens	5:49
9.	"Underworld"	Stone; Shorten; Malcolm; Stevens; E. 'Kenya' Baker	4:08
10.	"Molly Town"	Stone; Shorten	3:34
11.	"Sensimilla"	Stone; Dennis Bovell; Shorten; Marlon Asher	4:17
12.	"Harry's Symphony"	Stone; Shorten	3:54
13.	"Clean Water"	Stone; Cyril	4:30
14.	"The Answer"	Stone; Bovell; Shorten	4:46

Target exclusive edition and Japanese edition bonus track
No.	Title	Writer(s)	Length
15.	"Water for Your Soul"	Stone; Shorten; Reeves	4:34

Amazon exclusive deluxe edition bonus disc
No.	Title	Length
1.	"Way Oh" (dub)
2.	"Love Me" (dub)
3.	"Harry's Symphony" (dub)
4.	"Sensimilla" (dub)
5.	"Molly Town" (dub)
6.	"Underworld" (featuring George Clinton) (dub)

== Personnel ==
Credits adapted from the liner notes of Water for Your Soul.

=== Musicians ===
- Joss Stone – vocals (all tracks); backing vocals (tracks 7–9)
- Richie Stevens – drums (tracks 1, 3, 7, 13)
- Pete Iannacone – bass (tracks 1–6, 8–11, 14)
- 'Level' Neville Malcolm – bass (tracks 1, 9); guitar (tracks 2, 6–8, 10–12, 14); electric guitar (track 5)
- Jeff Scantlebury – congas (tracks 1, 3); percussion (tracks 2, 7, 12, 13); drums (track 3)
- Stanley Andrews – guitar (tracks 1, 3)
- Leon Mobley – percussion (tracks 1, 3, 5–9, 11, 12, 14)
- Jonathan Shorten – piano (tracks 1, 3, 6–12, 14); keyboards (tracks 1, 2, 4, 6); Wurlitzer (track 2); organ (tracks 3, 9, 12); Rhodes (track 5); Hammond (tracks 7, 8, 10, 14); melodica (tracks 8, 9); clavinet (track 13)
- Jeff T. Watkins – saxophone (tracks 1, 3, 10, 12); horn arrangements
- Ian Smith – trumpet, trombone (tracks 1, 3, 10, 12)
- Artia Lockett – backing vocals (tracks 1–4, 6, 10, 13, 14)
- Ellison Kendrick – backing vocals (tracks 1–4, 6, 10, 13, 14)
- Antonia Jenae' – backing vocals (tracks 1–4, 6, 10, 13, 14)
- Ricardo Jordan – drums (tracks 2, 4–6, 8–12)
- Alan Weekes – guitar (tracks 2, 4, 6, 9–14); electric guitar (track 5)
- Wil Malone – string arrangement (tracks 2, 4, 5, 8)
- Tony Stanton – copyist (tracks 2, 4, 5, 8)
- London Session Orchestra – strings (tracks 2, 4, 5, 8)
- Damon Bryson – tuba (track 4)
- Lakehouse Music Academy (Note: Christina Olson, Ava DiLouie, Broke Lichthardt and Luke Bonenfant.) – children's choir (track 4)
- Nitin Sawhney – nylon guitar (track 5)
- Orphy Robinson – vibraphone (tracks 6, 11)
- Dennis Bovell – bass (track 7); backing vocals (track 14)
- Janet Ramus – backing vocals (tracks 7, 9, 13)
- Michelle John – backing vocals (tracks 7, 9, 13)
- Damian Marley – additional vocals (track 7)
- Steve Down – guitar (track 10); acoustic guitar (track 13)
- Ashwin Srinivasan – bansuri flute (track 11)
- Aref Durvesh – tabla (track 11); dholak (track 12)
- Marc Cyril – bass (tracks 12, 13)
- Linton Kwesi Johnson – vocal sample (track 12)
- Jonathan Joseph – drums (track 14)
- Ponciano Almeida – berimbau (track 14)
- Joe Broughton – violin (track 14)
- Paloma Trigas – violin (track 14)
- Sarah Harrison – violin (track 14)
- Judacamp Choir – gospel choir (track 14)
- Jules "Juda" Bartholomew – choir direction, choir arrangement

=== Technical ===
- Joss Stone – production
- Jonathan Shorten – production, engineering
- Steve Greenwell – production, engineering, mixing
- Brian Nelson – executive production
- Tommy Williams – additional engineering
- Jay Auburn – additional engineering
- Chris Athens – mastering
- Eddie Ward – additional engineering
- Robert Hall – engineering assistance
- Erik Romero – engineering, engineering assistance
- Tim Tannella – engineering assistance
- Andre "A-minor" Johnson – choir engineering
- Jon Bailey – string engineering
- John Prestage – engineering assistance

=== Artwork ===
- Aoife Hastings – art design
- Rod Cousins – additional art design, layout

== Charts ==
=== Weekly charts ===
Weekly chart performance for Water for Your Soul
Chart (2015)	Peak position
Austrian Albums (Ö3 Austria)	13
Belgian Albums (Ultratop Flanders)	27
Belgian Albums (Ultratop Wallonia)	68
Canadian Albums (Billboard)	25
Dutch Albums (Album Top 100)	3
French Albums (SNEP)	77
German Albums (Offizielle Top 100)	11
Italian Albums (FIMI)	30
Scottish Albums (Official Charts)	22
Swiss Albums (Schweizer Hitparade)	1
UK Albums (Official Charts)	13
UK Independent Albums (Official Charts)	1
US Billboard 200	34
US Independent Albums (Billboard)	3
US Reggae Albums (Billboard)	1
US Top R&B/Hip-Hop Albums (Billboard)	6

=== Year-end charts ===
2015 year-end chart performance for Water for Your Soul
Chart (2015)	Position
US Reggae Albums (Billboard)	1

2016 year-end chart performance for Water for Your Soul
Chart (2016)	Position
US Reggae Albums (Billboard)	6
