= The High Road (Broken Bells song) =

2009 single

Single by Broken Bells

from the album Broken Bells
- Released: December 22, 2009
- Recorded: Mondo Studio (Los Angeles)
- Genre: Indietronica
- Length: 3:52
- Label: Columbia
- Songwriters: James Mercer; Brian Burton
- Producer: Danger Mouse

Broken Bells singles chronology
"The High Road" (2009)	"The Ghost Inside" (2010)

"The High Road" is a song by American alternative rock duo Broken Bells from their self-titled debut album (2010). Written by James Mercer and Danger Mouse, and produced by the latter, the song was released as the album's lead single on December 22, 2009. On March 9, 2010, the song was the iTunes Single of the Week, where it was offered for free for one week. The music video for the song was directed by Sophie Muller.

== Critical reception ==
"The High Road" was well received by music critics, who praised the lyrics and song's production. Heather Phares of AllMusic stated the song "melds slick electronic percussion and a searching, minor-key melody into something that echoes the duo's previous work without rehashing it." Shingai of idobi Radio wrote that "'The High Road' serves as a great introduction [for the album], with soothing multi-layered vocals and beautiful lyrics weaving in and out of hypnotizing drum beats, synths and various other instruments." PopMatters' Anthony Lombardi observed, "When Mercer and Burton are on point [...] it works, and works well: opener and lead single, 'The High Road', proves the perfect vantage point, its minor-key melody, noodly synths and clapping percussion providing an ample bed for the soaring, swelling chorus."

== Commercial performance ==
"The High Road" peaked at number ten on the Billboard Alternative Songs chart, becoming the duo's highest-peaking single to date on the chart. The single also made an appearance on Billboard's Hot Rock Songs where it peaked at number fifteen. It reached number sixty on the Japan Hot 100 and number seventy-five on the Canadian Hot 100 in Canada, where it was certified gold by Music Canada.

== Charts ==
=== Weekly charts ===
Chart (2010)	Peak position
Canada (Canadian Hot 100)	75
Canada Rock (Billboard)	22
Japan Hot 100 (Billboard)	60
US Alternative Songs (Billboard)	10
US Hot Rock & Alternative Songs (Billboard)	15
US Hot Singles Sales (Billboard)	12

=== Year-end charts ===
Chart (2010)	Position
US Alternative Songs (Billboard)	29
US Hot Rock Songs (Billboard)	47

== Certifications ==
Region	Certification	Certified units/sales
Canada (Music Canada)	Gold	40,000^{*}
New Zealand (RMNZ)	Gold	15,000^{‡}
United States (RIAA)	Platinum	1,000,000^{‡}
^{*} Sales figures based on certification alone.^{‡} Sales+streaming figures based on certification alone.

== Joss Stone version ==
"The High Road"

Song by Joss Stone

from the album The Soul Sessions Vol. 2
- Released: July 16, 2012
- Genre: Soul
- Length: 4:40
- Label: S-Curve; Stone'd
- Songwriters: James Mercer; Brian Burton
- Producers: Steve Greenwell; Joss Stone; Steve Greenberg

In 2012, English singer and songwriter Joss Stone covered the song for her sixth album, The Soul Sessions Vol. 2. A lyric video premiered on July 3, 2012, while the official music video, directed by Brian Savelson, debuted on September 13.

=== Development and production ===
Stone told Rolling Stone that while they were considering tracks for the album, Steve Greenberg played "The High Road" for her. "I thought it sounded good. I'd never heard the song before this and thought I'd give it a try, with a bit of a twist!" In an interview with Billboard magazine, she said, "I think 'High Road' is quite a different one for me. It's still soul but it's got a darker tone to it, certainly in the beginning of the song."

=== Critical reception ===
Stone's version received positive reviews from music critics, who compared it to her 2003 cover of The White Stripes' song "Fell in Love with a Girl". Christina Lee of Idolator opined that Stone "delivers a robust, impassioned take on the first-ever Broken Bells single". Hal Horowitz of American Songwriter stated, "Like her revelatory reading of the White Stripes' 'Fell in Love with a Girl' from the first set, Stone brings her throaty R&B to the Broken Bells' 'The High Road' in one of this album's finest performances."

The Observer's Hermione Hoby described the song as a "bombastic cover". Stephen Thomas Erlewine of AllMusic praised the choice and the song's production, writing that Stone "refashioned [the Broken Bells' song] to sound old, thereby occupying the same space as Joss' White Stripes 'Fell in Love with a Boy' cover did on the first Soul Sessions. This is the song to prove that Stone isn't living in the past but rather she's seeing the future through a retro prism that turns everything into something that feels classic."

=== Personnel ===
Credits adapted from the liner notes of The Soul Sessions Vol. 2.

- Joss Stone – lead vocals, backing vocals, production
- Raymond Angry – B3, piano
- Chris Gehringer – mastering
- Steve Greenberg – production
- Steve Greenwell – engineering, mixing, production
- Pete Iannacone – bass
- Ernie Isley – guitars
- Lowell Reynolds – assistant engineering
- Tony Royster, Jr. – drums
- Ted Tuthill – assistant engineering
- Betty Wright – backing vocals
