= The Soul Sessions Vol. 2 =

Studio album by Joss Stone
- Released: 20 July 2012
- Studio: Blackbird (Nashville); Sear Sound (New York City); Stevestudio (New York City); Sono (Prague)
- Genre: Soul; R&B
- Length: 47:51
- Label: S-Curve; Stone'd
- Producer: Steve Greenberg; Steve Greenwell; Joss Stone

Joss Stone chronology
The Best of Joss Stone 2003–2009 (2011)	The Soul Sessions Vol. 2 (2012)	Water for Your Soul (2015)

Singles from The Soul Sessions Vol. 2
- 1. "While You're Out Looking for Sugar" Released: 15 June 2012; 2. "Pillow Talk" Released: 4 November 2012; 3. "Teardrops" Released: 24 February 2013

The Soul Sessions Vol. 2 is the sixth studio album by English singer and songwriter Joss Stone, released on 20 July 2012 by S-Curve Records and her own label, Stone'd Records. A follow-up to Stone's debut studio album, The Soul Sessions (2003), the album consists of 11 cover versions of soul songs from the 1960s, 1970s and 1980s, in addition to a cover of Broken Bells' 2009 song "The High Road".

Upon its release, the album received mostly mixed reviews from music critics. The Soul Sessions Vol. 2 debuted at number six on the UK Albums Chart, while charting within the top 10 in the United States and select countries in continental Europe.

== Background ==
The Soul Sessions Vol. 2 was recorded over two live recording sessions in New York City and Nashville. The album is a joint release between Stone's own independent label Stone'd Records and S-Curve Records, the label that released her first two studio albums, The Soul Sessions (2003) and Mind Body & Soul (2004). Stone stated, "I really had fun revisiting The Soul Sessions' idea and I'm really pleased with the results. I've committed long term to my label Stone'd Records, but it felt right to team up with Steve Greenberg and S-Curve again for this release. I think there are some great songs on the album and I loved performing them with such brilliant musicians."

== Promotion ==
On 6 June 2012, Stone performed a concert at the London music venue Under the Bridge, which was streamed online via Perez Hilton's website in the United States and MSN for the rest of the world. During the concert Stone, performed several new tracks from the album as well as previous material. Stone also performed for Billboard's Tastemakers series in June 2012. Stone performed and was interviewed on the British television programme This Morning. On 27 July 2012, she performed on The Tonight Show with Jay Leno.

== Reception ==
Professional ratings
Review scores
Source	Rating
AllMusic	3/5 stars
American Songwriter	3.5/5 stars
Entertainment Weekly	C+
Evening Standard	4/5 stars
The Guardian	4/5 stars
Mojo	2/5 stars
The Observer	3/5 stars
Rolling Stone	2.5/5 stars
Slant Magazine	3/5 stars
Uncut	3/5 stars

The Soul Sessions Vol. 2 received generally mixed reviews from music critics. At Metacritic, which assigns a normalised rating out of 100 to reviews from mainstream publications, the album received an average score of 60, based on 11 reviews. Mojo magazine said it "sounds like a calculated genre exercise", while Kyle Anderson of Entertainment Weekly found the covers "passionately pointless" when compared to the originals. Slant Magazine's Jonathan Keefe said the album sounds commonplace because of its attempt to recreate "a vintage R&B vibe rather than looking to classic styles as a source of inspiration for something more contemporary or creative". Hermione Hoby of The Observer wrote that Stone's singing is "technically irreproachable throughout, [but] every track is attacked with all the timidity of a tsunami—enough to prompt the peevish complaint that force and feeling are not the same thing." Jody Rosen, writing in Rolling Stone, was more critical and felt Stone's "musical instincts are off [...] she steamrolls nearly every song with her bombastic blues growl."

In a more enthusiastic review for AllMusic, critic Stephen Thomas Erlewine believed "for the most part, The Soul Sessions, Vol. 2 does feel right: it has the form and sound of classic soul while never acknowledging that R&B continued to develop past, say, 1972. For an audience that agrees with that thesis, this is fun." The Guardian's Dave Simpson described the album as "a powerful, heartfelt and classy comeback", claiming that Stone has "certainly returned to her debut's soul covers format in more mature and superb voice." Hal Horowitz of American Songwriter called the album "pretty terrific" as it "proves the UK singer is serious about her classic American R&B". John Aizlewood of BBC Music viewed The Soul Sessions Vol. 2 as "Stone's most focused and rewarding album since Vol 1".

== Commercial performance ==
The Soul Sessions Vol. 2 debuted at number six on the UK Albums Chart with 8,414 copies sold in its first week, Stone's first top-10 album in the United Kingdom since Mind Body & Soul (2004). In the United States, the album debuted at number 10 on the Billboard 200 with first-week sales of 24,000 copies, becoming her fourth top-10 album on the chart. In continental Europe, it reached the top five in the Netherlands and Switzerland, and the top 10 in Austria and Germany.

== Track listing ==
No.	Title	Writer(s)	Original artist	Length
1.	"I Got The..."	Labi Siffre	Labi Siffre (1975)	4:59
2.	"(For God's Sake) Give More Power to the People"	Eugene Record	The Chi-Lites (1971)	3:44
3.	"While You're Out Looking for Sugar"	Ronald Dunbar; Edythe Wayne	Honey Cone (1969)	3:28
4.	"Sideway Shuffle"	Linda Lewis	Linda Lewis (1974)	3:38
5.	"I Don't Want to Be with Nobody but You"	Eddie Floyd; Joe Shamwell	Dorothy Moore (1976)	5:00
6.	"Teardrops"	Cecil Womack; Linda Womack	Womack & Womack (1988)	5:55
7.	"Stoned Out of My Mind"	Barbara Acklin; Record	The Chi-Lites (1973)	3:12
8.	"The Love We Had (Stays on My Mind)"	Terry Callier; Larry Wade	The Dells (1971)	4:42
9.	"The High Road"	James Mercer; Brian Burton	Broken Bells (2009)	4:40
10.	"Pillow Talk"	Sylvia Robinson; Michael Burton	Sylvia (1973)	4:42
11.	"Then You Can Tell Me Goodbye"	John D. Loudermilk	The Casinos (1967)	3:51
Total length:				47:51

Deluxe edition bonus tracks
No.	Title	Writer(s)	Original artist	Length
12.	"First Taste of Hurt"	Wilson Turbinton	Willie Tee (1972)	3:39
13.	"One Love in My Lifetime"	Theresa G. McFaddin; Lawrence Brown; Leonard Perry	Diana Ross (1976)	3:49
14.	"Nothing Takes the Place of You"	Toussaint McCall; Alan Robinson	Toussaint McCall (1967)	3:25
15.	"(1-2-3-4-5-6-7) Count the Days"	Charlie Foxx; Brooks O'Dell Johnson; Jerry Williams Jr.; Yvonne Williams	Inez and Charlie Foxx (1967)	3:44
Total length:				62:28

Japanese edition bonus track
No.	Title	Writer(s)	Original artist	Length
16.	"Sideshow"	Bobby Eli; Vinny Barrett	Blue Magic (1974)	4:57

== Personnel ==
Credits adapted from the liner notes of the deluxe edition of The Soul Sessions Vol. 2.

=== Musicians ===
- Joss Stone – vocals (tracks 1–8, 10, 12–14); finger snaps (track 1); lead vocals, background vocals (tracks 9, 11, 15); handclaps, glockenspiel (track 15)
- Raymond Angry – B3 (tracks 1–3, 5, 6, 8–10, 12–14); clavinet (track 4); Wurlitzer electric piano (track 7); piano (track 9)
- Clayton Ivey – Wurlitzer electric piano (tracks 1, 4–6, 15); piano (tracks 2, 8, 12–14); B3 (track 7); Rhodes (track 10)
- Ernie Isley – guitar (tracks 1, 3–7, 9, 10, 13–15)
- Pete Iannacone – bass (all tracks)
- Tony Royster Jr. – drums (all tracks)
- Eric Darken – finger snaps (track 1); percussion (tracks 4, 15); tambourine (track 12); handclaps (track 15)
- FILMharmonic Orchestra – strings (tracks 1, 6, 11, 13)
- Marko Ivanović – conducting (tracks 1, 6, 11, 13)
- Rita Chepurchenko – concert mistress (tracks 1, 6, 11, 13)
- Nathan Kelly – string arrangement (track 1); copyist, co-orchestration (tracks 6, 11, 13)
- John Angier – string arrangement (tracks 1, 6, 11, 13)
- Petr Pycha – Prague orchestra contractor (tracks 1, 6, 11, 13)
- Gary Chester – US orchestra coordination (tracks 1, 6, 11, 13)
- William McFarlane – guitar (tracks 2, 8, 12)
- Delbert McClinton – harmonica (track 2)
- Latimore – piano (tracks 3, 15); 1-2-3-4-5-6-7 (track 15)
- James Alexander – bass (track 3)
- Hollie Farris – trumpet (tracks 4, 5, 12)
- Jeff Watkins – saxophones (tracks 5, 12)
- Chris Dunn – trombone (tracks 5, 12)
- Betty Wright – background vocals (tracks 9, 11, 15)
- Steve Bryant – guitar (tracks 10, 11)

=== Technical ===
- Pavel Karlík – string engineering (tracks 1, 6, 11, 13)
- Steve Greenwell – production, engineering, mixing
- Joss Stone – production, executive production
- Steve Greenberg – production, executive production
- Brian Nelson – executive production, project coordination
- Lowell Reynolds – engineering assistance
- Ted Tuthill – engineering assistance
- Janeen Hovnanian – production assistance
- Jill Dell'Abate – project coordination
- Chris Gehringer – mastering

=== Artwork ===
- Mr.G.e.v.Zoeller – original painting
- Rod Cousins – art direction
- David Venni – photography
- Charles Allen Smith – additional photography
- Daniel Slezinger – additional photography

== Charts ==
=== Weekly charts ===
Chart (2012)	Peak position
Argentine Albums (CAPIF)	5
Australian Albums (ARIA)	42
Australian Jazz & Blues Albums (ARIA)	1
Austrian Albums (Ö3 Austria)	6
Belgian Albums (Ultratop Flanders)	25
Belgian Albums (Ultratop Wallonia)	44
Canadian Albums (Billboard)	23
Dutch Albums (Album Top 100)	2
French Albums (SNEP)	82
German Albums (Offizielle Top 100)	7
Italian Albums (FIMI)	62
Scottish Albums (OCC)	24
South Korean International Albums (Gaon)	35
Swiss Albums (Schweizer Hitparade)	5
UK Albums (OCC)	6
UK R&B Albums (OCC)	3
US Billboard 200	10
US Top R&B/Hip-Hop Albums (Billboard)	3

=== Year-end charts ===
Chart (2012)	Position
Australian Jazz & Blues Albums (ARIA)	17
US Top R&B/Hip-Hop Albums (Billboard)	89

== Release history ==
Region	Date	Format	Edition	Label	Ref.
Ireland	20 July 2012	CD; digital download	Standard; deluxe	Warner Bros.	
Netherlands	20 July 2012	CD; digital download	Standard; deluxe	Warner	
United Kingdom	20 July 2012	Digital download	Standard; deluxe	Warner Bros.	
Germany	23 July 2012	Digital download	Deluxe	Warner	
United Kingdom	23 July 2012	CD	Standard; deluxe	Warner Bros.	
Australia	27 July 2012	CD	Standard; deluxe	Warner	
Australia	27 July 2012	Digital download	Standard	Warner	
Canada	31 July 2012	CD; LP	Standard	Universal	
Canada	31 July 2012	Digital download	Standard; deluxe	Universal	
United States	31 July 2012	CD; digital download	Standard; deluxe	S-Curve; Stone'd	
United States	31 July 2012	LP	Standard	S-Curve; Stone'd	
Germany	24 August 2012	CD	Standard; deluxe	Warner	
Japan	19 September 2012	CD	Japan standard	Warner	
Italy	2 October 2012	CD	Standard	Warner	
Italy	16 October 2012	CD	Deluxe	Warner	
