= Yes Sir Boss =

Musical group in Bristol, England

Yes Sir Boss!
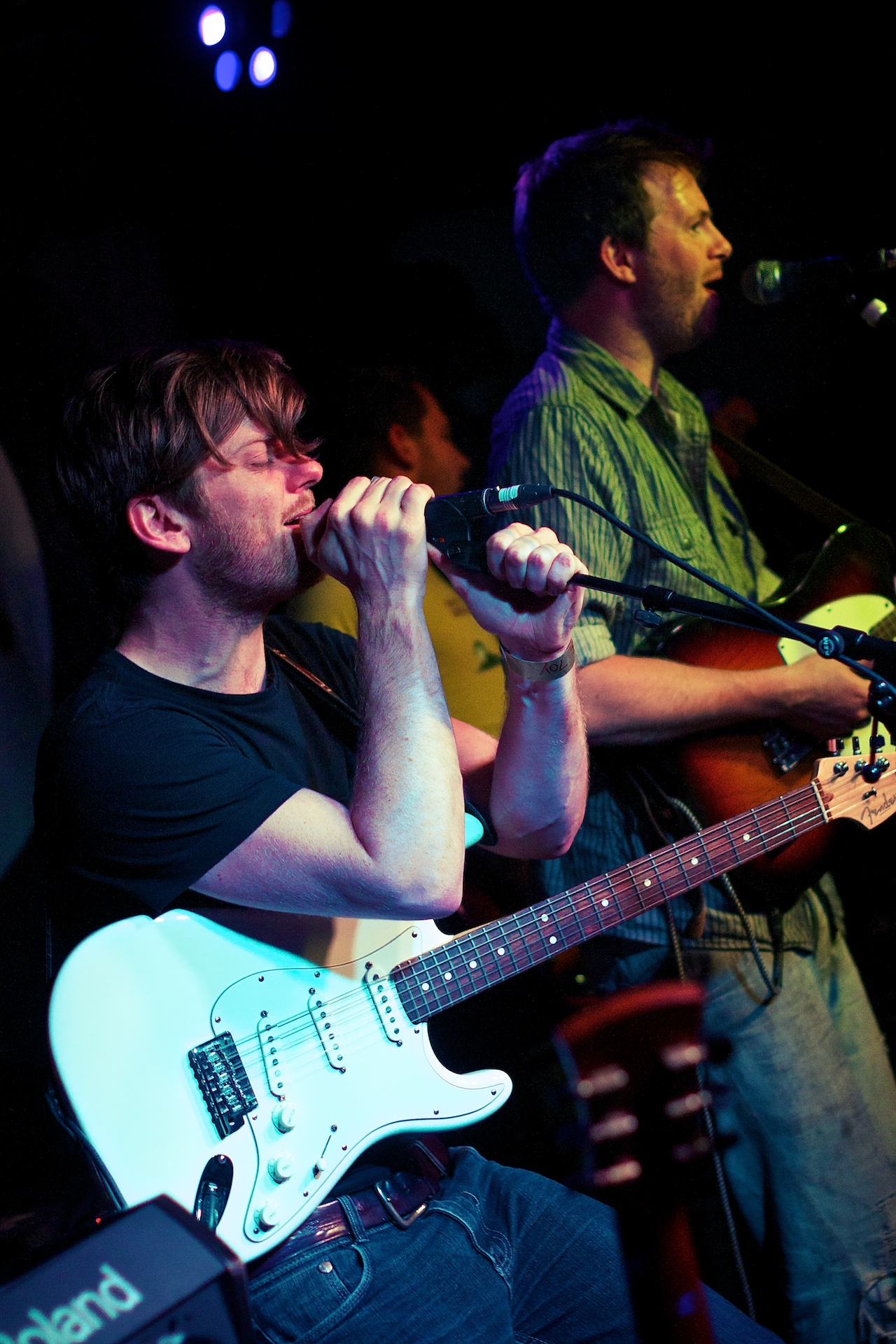
- Yes Sir Boss in 2012

Background information
- Origin: Bristol, England
- Genres: Ska punk
- Years active: 2007–present
- Labels: Stone'd
- Members: Matthew Sellors; Tom First; Jehan Abdel-Malak; Josh Stopford; Reuben Nimmo

Yes Sir Boss! is an English, Bristol-based ska punk band, founded in 2007 at Falmouth University. The band were signed under Stone'd Records and released an EP with the label, Desperation State, before self-releasing King in a Rocking Chair in 2014.

== Biography ==
The band was founded by Matt Sellors, Luke potter, Tom First, Jehan Abdel-Malak, and Josh Stopford in 2007 while they were studying for their degrees. Their music has been described as reggae with teeth, energetic, and upbeat. An opening show featuring Joss Stone was cancelled in 2007 after discovery of back ticket sales.

In 2012, Yes Sir Boss signed with Stone'd Records, an independent record label founded by Grammy winning soul singer Joss Stone and, later that year, released their first label titled Desperation State. FMV Magazine gave the album 3 stars citing confidence and flair while criticising the album for being formulaic at times. Helen Earnshaw of Female First gave the album a 4 out of 5 rating in a review that describes the music as a successful blend of Balkan Blues and indie rock.

In 2013, the band released a collaborated single featuring Stone titled Mrs #1.

Yes Sir Boss toured music festivals in Europe and is scheduled to tour Germany, Netherlands, France, Austria, Switzerland and Scandinavia. A second album was released in April 2014 titled King in a Rocking Chair.

Yes Sir Boss made a television appearance in 2013 on critically acclaimed live magazine entertainment show T.B.A. hosted by Chris Lloyd and Caroline De Moraes. To an entranced studio audience reception, the band performed their hit singles Not Guilty and Till You Get Yours from the seminal album Desperation State.

The line "Yes, Sir Boss" comes from the novel A Connecticut Yankee in King Arthur's Court.

== Discography ==
- Desperation State (2012)
- King in a Rocking Chair (2014)
- Yes Sir Boss (2015)

== See also ==
- List of British punk bands
- List of bands from Bristol
