= Never Forget My Love =

2022 studio album by Joss Stone

Studio album by Joss Stone
- Released: 11 February 2022
- Studios: Blackbird (Nashville, Tennessee); Little Big Sound (Bellevue, Tennessee) (Note: Strings and brass); Dogwood (Note: Additional overdubs and woodwinds)
- Genre: R&B
- Length: 45:02
- Label: Bay Street
- Producer: Dave Stewart

Joss Stone chronology
Water for Your Soul (2015)	Never Forget My Love (2022)	Merry Christmas, Love (2022)

Singles from Never Forget My Love
- 1. "Never Forget My Love" Released: 12 November 2021; 2. "Breaking Each Other's Hearts" Released: 24 December 2021; 3. "Oh to Be Loved by You" Released: 10 February 2022

Never Forget My Love is the eighth studio album by English singer and songwriter Joss Stone, released on 11 February 2022 by Bay Street Records.

== Critical reception ==
Professional ratings
Review scores
Source	Rating
AllMusic	3.5/5 stars

AllMusic editor Andy Kellman described Never Forget My Love as Stone's "most R&B-oriented set of original material since Introducing Joss Stone [...] As with that 2011 full-length, these songs come across as deliberately crafted in a way that differentiates them from the much greater volume of comparatively off-the-cuff material in Stone's catalog. The singer sounds more comfortable than she has in some time, whether she's referencing prime Burt Bacharach (with whom Stone performed in 2019), classic Memphis soul, or the Staple Singers, or bringing to mind a cross between Betty Wright and Bill Withers (specifically on the title song, a highlight). For the most part, this is full-tilt Stone – a delight for those who want to hear her let it all out, even when the song doesn't necessarily call for it."

== Track listing ==
All tracks are written by David A. Stewart and Joss Stone; all tracks are produced by Stewart.

No.	Title	Length
1.	"Breaking Each Other's Hearts"	4:43
2.	"Never Forget My Love"	3:41
3.	"No Regrets"	3:43
4.	"Oh to Be Loved by You"	3:33
5.	"Love You Till the Very End"	4:40
6.	"You're My Girl"	4:14
7.	"The Greatest Secret"	5:00
8.	"Does It Have to Be Today"	3:52
9.	"You Couldn't Kill Me"	5:14
10.	"When You're in Love"	6:22
Total length:		45:02

== Personnel ==
Credits adapted from the liner notes of Never Forget My Love.

=== Musicians ===
- Joss Stone – lead vocals (all tracks); backing vocals (tracks 2–4, 6–10)
- Chad Cromwell – drums (all tracks); percussion (tracks 2, 4, 5)
- Michael Rhodes – bass guitar (all tracks)
- Tom Bukovac – electric guitar (all tracks); acoustic guitar (track 8)
- Dan Dugmore – electric guitar (tracks 1–4, 6–10); pedal steel guitar (track 5)
- Dave Stewart – acoustic guitar (tracks 1, 5, 6); electric guitar (tracks 2, 6); acoustic 12-string (track 9); backing vocals (track 10)
- Mike Rojas – piano (tracks 1, 3, 5–10); Rhodes (tracks 2, 4); clavinet (track 2); B3 organ (tracks 3, 4, 6, 10); tubular bells (tracks 4, 5, 8, 9); accordion (track 5)
- Steve Herrman – trumpet (tracks 1, 2, 4–6)
- John Hinchey – trombone (tracks 1, 2, 4–6)
- Jesse Samler – percussion (tracks 1, 3, 9)
- Mike Bradford – percussion (tracks 1, 3); acoustic guitar (track 3)
- David Davidson – violin (tracks 1–8, 10)
- David Angell – violin (tracks 1–8, 10)
- Jenny Bifano – violin (tracks 1–8, 10)
- Kristin Wilkinson – viola (tracks 1–8, 10)
- Monisa Angell – viola (tracks 1–8, 10)
- Carole Rabinowitz – cello (tracks 1–8, 10)
- Steve Patrick – trumpet, flugelhorn (tracks 1, 3, 5, 7, 8)
- Jennifer Kummer – French horn (tracks 1, 3, 5, 7, 8)
- Anna Spina – French horn (tracks 1, 3, 5, 7, 8)
- Barry Green – trombone (tracks 1, 3, 5, 7, 8)
- Matt Jefferson – trombone (tracks 1, 3, 5, 7, 8)
- Sam Levine – flute, clarinet (tracks 1–3, 5, 7, 8)
- Tim Lauer – harpsichord (tracks 1, 3); percussion, celeste (tracks 1, 5); Mellotron (track 1); orchestration
- Artia Lockett – backing vocals (tracks 2–4, 10)
- Shaneka Hamilton – backing vocals (tracks 3, 4, 6, 8, 10)
- Theron 'Therry' Thomas – backing vocals (tracks 3, 4, 6, 8, 10)
- Stephen Lamb – score preparation

=== Technical ===
- Dave Stewart – production, additional mixing
- John McBride – recording, tracking
- Steve Greenwell – mixing at Steve Greenwell's (Asbury Park, New Jersey)
- Michael Bradford – additional mixing
- Lowell Reynolds – additional recording
- Allen Ditto – recording assistance
- Jesse Samler – recording assistance, mixing assistance
- Taylor Poller – string recording, brass recording
- Ross Collier – additional overdubs, woodwind recording
- Christian Wright – mastering at Abbey Road Studios (London)

=== Artwork ===
- Kristin Burns – cover photography
- Allen Clark – additional photography
- Laurence Stevens – sleeve design, typography
- LSD Studio – graphic artwork

== Charts ==
Chart performance for Never Forget My Love
Chart (2022)	Peak position
Scottish Albums (Official Charts)	83
Swiss Albums (Schweizer Hitparade)	16
UK Albums Sales (OCC)	27
UK Album Downloads (Official Charts)	20
UK Independent Albums (Official Charts)	14
UK Physical Albums (OCC)	31
UK R&B Albums (Official Charts)	1

== Release history ==
Release history for Never Forget My Love
Region	Date	Format(s)	Label	Ref.
Various	11 February 2022	CD; LP; digital download; streaming	Bay Street	
Japan	March 25, 2022	CD	BSMF RECORDS	
