= Tony Royster Jr. =

American drummer (born 1984)

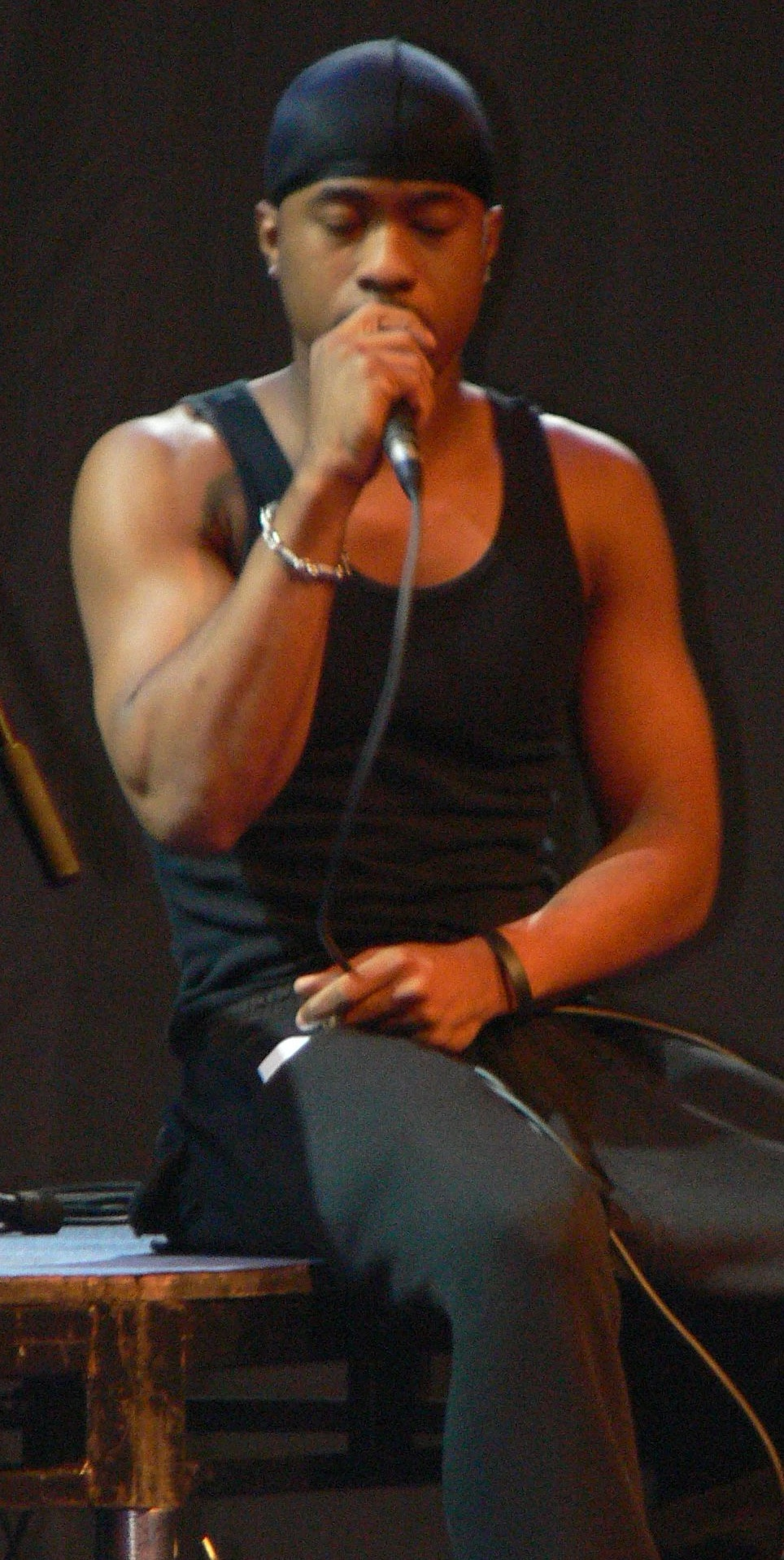
- Royster on stage in 2006

Background information
- Also known as: The Prodigy
- Born: Tony Royster Jr. October 9, 1984 (age 41)
- Origin: Hinesville, Georgia, U.S.
- Genres: Pop; rock; gospel; experimental; jazz fusion; hip hop; funk; trip hop
- Occupations: Musician
- Instruments: Drums; percussion

Tony Royster Jr. (born October 9, 1984, in Nuremberg, Germany) is an American musician. He was raised in Hinesville, Georgia and is a 2002 graduate of Liberty County High School. His father began to teach him how to play the drums at the age of three. He is the son of Tony Sr. and Gayle Royster, and has one brother, Calvin Royster. All still reside in Hinesville, GA.

== Biography ==
Royster was given endorsement deals with DW Drums, Zildjian Cymbals, Vic Firth sticks, Remo drumheads, LP percussion, Drumframe, Shure microphones, Warner Bros. Publications and Gopro Cameras.

Royster has played with Imajin, Lazyeye, New Flava, and En Vogue. He performed on the 42nd Annual Grammy Awards show at the age of 15, and an international tour in 2001 backing #1 selling Japanese artist Hikaru Utada as well as performing with Paul Shaffer (of Late Show with David Letterman) in the Nickelodeon House Band. In addition, he is also currently playing with Francisco Fattoruso, Jay-Z, Joe Jonas, Joss Stone and his own band. Royster Jr. released the videos "Pure Energy" (2007), and The Evolution of Tony Royster (2009), which are both more inspirational than instructional.

Some other high points of his career include playing the Glastonbury Festival and President Barack Obama's inaugural ball with Jay-Z in 2009. He has received the “Louis Armstrong Jazz Award”, a prestigious award that recognizes a musician's level of musicianship, character, and individual creativity. Tony has also received a “Senior Award” for his accomplishments in the world of drumming. In 2006, Tony Royster Jr. teamed up with Hidden Beach Recordings to produce Unwrapped Vol. 6: Give the Drummer Some!, debuting at #1 on the jazz charts. On August 22, 2011, he was the featured artist on Late Show with David Letterman, performing a drum solo for Drum Solo Week II. Royster Jr. was also featured on The Tonight Show with Jay Leno on August 3, 2011, and on Conan on November 7, 2011, alongside Joe Jonas. He has also performed a solo on the Jenny Jones show for the World's Most Talented Kids and Pets taping at the age of 12.

He also toured with Charlie Puth in 2016 and 2017, playing over 100 shows with him.

== Equipment ==
His solo kit configuration with groups like Imajin include:

- DW Drums Collectors Maple
- 18"x22" [x2] Bass drum with 8"x22" [x2] Bass drum woofer
- 5"x13" Collectors Maple snare
- 7"x8" Rack Tom
- 8"x10" Rack Tom
- 9"x12" Rack Tom
- 11"x14" Floor Tom
- 13"x15" Floor Tom
- 14"x18" Floor Tom

His Kit while on tour with Jay-Z consists of:

- DW Drums Collectors Maple
- 18"x22" Bass drum
- 5"x13" Collectors Maple snare
- 8"x10" Rack Tom
- 9"x12" Rack Tom
- 13"x15" Floor Tom
- 14"x18" Floor Tom

Tony uses DW 9000 pedals, DW 9000 hardware, Remo Drumheads, & Vic Firth Sticks

Tony uses Sabian Cymbals as of October 2022
