= Merry Christmas, Love =

Studio album by Joss Stone
- Released: 30 September 2022
- Genre: Christmas; soul; R&B
- Length: 49:12
- Label: S-Curve
- Producer: Joss Stone

Joss Stone chronology
| Never Forget My Love (2022) | Merry Christmas, Love (2022) |

Singles from Merry Christmas, Love
- 1. "What Christmas Means to Me" Released: 7 September 2022

Merry Christmas, Love is the ninth studio album by English singer Joss Stone. It was released by S-Curve Records on 30 September 2022.

== Promotion ==
The album's first single, "What Christmas Means to Me", was released on 7 September 2022. "Bring on Christmas Day", an original song which was written and produced by Stone, was released as a promotional single on YouTube on 16 September 2022, followed by a lyric video for "Winter Wonderland" on 30 September. A music video for "What Christmas Means to Me" premiered online on 4 November 2022.

== Track listing ==
All tracks produced by Joss Stone.

Merry Christmas, Love track listing
| No. | Title | Writer(s) | Length |
|---|---|---|---|
| 1. | "'Twas the Night Before Christmas" | Traditional | 0:39 |
| 2. | "Let It Snow" | Sammy Cahn; Jule Styne | 2:04 |
| 3. | "What Christmas Means to Me" | Allen Story; Anna Gordy Gaye; George Gordy | 3:11 |
| 4. | "Winter Wonderland" | Felix Bernard; Richard Bernhard Smith | 2:28 |
| 5. | "Jingle Bells" | Traditional | 2:29 |
| 6. | "Away in a Manger" | Traditional | 3:13 |
| 7. | "The Christmas Song" | Mel Tormé; Robert Wells | 3:52 |
| 8. | "If You Believe" | Joss Stone | 3:29 |
| 9. | "Hark! The Herald Angels Sing" | Traditional | 3:39 |
| 10. | "Snow" | Irving Berlin | 2:39 |
| 11. | "Have Yourself a Merry Little Christmas" | Hugh Martin; Ralph Blane | 2:57 |
| 12. | "O Little Town of Bethlehem" | Traditional | 3:22 |
| 13. | "White Christmas" | Berlin | 3:30 |
| 14. | "In the Bleak Midwinter" | Traditional | 4:21 |
| 15. | "Bring on Christmas Day" | Stone | 3:48 |
| 16. | "Silent Night" | Traditional | 3:48 |

== Personnel ==
- Shawn Daugherty – assistant engineer
- Chris Gehringer – mastering engineer
- Steve Greenwell – mixing engineer
- Charly Hutchings – producer assistant
- Dave Kalmusky – additional engineering
- Will Kinzle – assistant engineer
- Nolan Knight – photographer
- Stephen Lamb – additional orchestration
- Tim Lauer – arranger
- Dave Paulin – assistant engineer
- Katelyn Prieboy – assistant engineer
- ST8MNT – graphic designer
- Joss Stone – producer
- Will Quinnell – assistant engineer
- Howard Willing – additional engineering

== Charts ==
Chart performance for Merry Christmas, Love
| Chart (2022) | Peak position |
|---|---|
| UK Album Downloads (OCC) | 55 |
| US Top Holiday Albums (Billboard) | 46 |

== Release history ==
Release dates and formats for Merry Christmas, Love
| Region | Date | Format(s) | Label | Ref. |
|---|---|---|---|---|
| Various | 30 September 2022 | CD; digital download; streaming | S-Curve Records | |
| Various | 11 November 2022 | Vinyl | S-Curve Records | |
