= LP1 (Joss Stone album) =

2011 studio album by Joss Stone

Studio album by Joss Stone
- Released: 21 July 2011
- Studio: Blackbird (Nashville, Tennessee)
- Genres: Blues; soul; R&B; rock
- Length: 40:07
- Labels: Stone'd; Surfdog
- Producers: Dave Stewart; Joss Stone

Joss Stone chronology
Colour Me Free! (2009)	LP1 (2011)	The Best of Joss Stone 2003–2009 (2011)

Singles from LP1
- 1. "Somehow" Released: 17 June 2011; 2. "Karma" Released: 3 October 2011; 3. "Don't Start Lying to Me Now" Released: 17 October 2011

LP1 is the fifth studio album by English singer and songwriter Joss Stone. It was released on 21 July 2011 on Stone's own label, Stone'd Records, in partnership with Surfdog Records, following her departure from EMI in 2010. The album was recorded at Blackbird Studios in Nashville, Tennessee, in six days. Stone co-wrote and co-produced the album with record producer and Eurythmics co-founder, Dave Stewart.

To promote the album, Stone and Stewart performed on The Tonight Show with Jay Leno on 11 July 2011, on The Late Late Show with Craig Ferguson on 13 July and on Live! with Regis and Kelly on 14 July.

== Critical reception ==
Professional ratings
Aggregate scores
Source	Rating
Metacritic	59/100
Review scores
Source	Rating
AllMusic	3.5/5 stars
The A.V. Club	C
The Daily Telegraph	3/5 stars
Entertainment Weekly	B
The Guardian	2/5 stars
The Independent	3/5 stars
Paste	7.5/10
PopMatters	4/10
Rolling Stone	3/5 stars
Slant Magazine	2.5/5 stars

LP1 received mixed reviews from music critics. At Metacritic, which assigns a normalised rating out of 100 to reviews from mainstream publications, the album received an average score of 59, based on 18 reviews. Jon Pareles of The New York Times wrote, "For most of the album she lets her big, smoky voice rip into songs of all-out romantic strife" and that "[h]er voice is a loose cannon; LP1 figures out how to aim it." The Boston Globe's Scott McLennan noted that the album "has bolder blues-rock and country undertones, and those platforms elevate the originality of Stone's raw talents." He further stated: "With her rich tone that is cut with a bit of rasp, Stone has the ability to inhabit songs the way good actors create characters." Stephen Thomas Erlewine of AllMusic stated that "Stewart is naturally reluctant to present Stone in a strictly soul setting; R&B is the foundation, but he dabbles in tight funk, folk, blues, Euro-rock, and modernist pop, giving LP1 just enough elasticity so it breathes and just enough color so it doesn't seem staid." Holly Gleason of Paste described the album as "a full-tumble of relentless musicianship, grit and soul" and compared it to Dusty Springfield's 1969 album Dusty in Memphis. She later concluded that "[i]n a world where machined dance fodder, rap-deckled pop and lumbering rawk dominates, a genuine article of soul music—especially one where the thick bass, tumbling Wurlitzer and bright guitars set the tone—is a joyous noise, indeed." The Guardian's Paul MacInnes believed that the album is "proficiently played and Stone's voice has a range and tonal dexterity that few of her peers possess", but "the final product is so familiar and so shorn of genuine emotion that LP1 quickly loses any sense of identity and becomes standard fare, indistinguishable from any number of other recordings." Colin McGuire agreed in his review for PopMatters, and said that the album is "missing the key element of why she has been so lauded over the course of her increasingly mature career: A groove. In fact, [LP1] lacks so much of a groove, it would be safe to say the singer has almost completely abandoned her soulful roots altogether", deeming the result "disappointing", "low-rent", "unexpected" and "most of all, it seems like something Joss Stone was previously above".

Caryn Ganz of Rolling Stone commented that "Stone is best when she's rawest, bookending LP1 with 'Newborn' and 'Take Good Care,' stripped-down tunes where her howl goes from plaintive to bone-shaking in a few lovesick heartbeats." Andy Gill of The Independent remarked that the album is "less hostage to a single specific style than any of her previous work" and that "the diversity emphasises her shared heritage with Janis Joplin, while retaining her core deep-soul strength on tracks such as 'Cry Myself to Sleep' and 'Newborn'." Matthew Cole from Slant Magazine felt that "sameness is [...] an issue [for the album], as most of the songs here aspire to little more than providing scenery for Stone's vocals." He continued: "This a wholly acceptable effort, but it makes it clear that Stone is stalling out a mere decade into what looked at first like a promising career." Mikael Wood of the Los Angeles Times viewed it as "Stone's most conventional record yet" and opined that "the music gestures toward the majestic balladry we've heard a lot of lately from Ryan Tedder in his productions for Beyoncé and Kelly Clarkson. But such a mild reward hardly seems worth the trouble of her protracted freedom fight." Kenny Herzog from The A.V. Club was emphatic, dubbing it Stone's "flattest and phoniest album yet" and "an almost shockingly forgettable slab of forced adult-contemporary rock", adding that "[d]espite a capable vocal range, Stone primarily dials up screechy wails [...] and contrived, finger-wagging sass." Joanne Huffa from Now argued that "[d]ated production could be overlooked if the songs were better, but there's a serious lack of hooks for a pop album. And since Stone's voice is the focal point, there's no escaping the leaden lyrics."

== Commercial performance ==
LP1 debuted and peaked at number 36 on the UK Albums Chart. In the United States, it debuted at number nine on the Billboard 200 with first-week sales of 30,000 copies, becoming Stone's third consecutive top-10 album on the chart, as well as her second highest-peaking album after Introducing Joss Stone (2007).

In June 2012, the album was awarded a gold certification from the Independent Music Companies Association (IMPALA), indicating sales in excess of 75,000 copies across Europe.

"Somehow" reached number 11 on the Japan Hot 100.

== Track listing ==
No.	Title	Writer(s)	Length
1.	"Newborn"	Joss Stone; Dave Stewart; Wendy Joseph	3:43
2.	"Karma"	Martina McBride; Brad Warren; Brett Warren; Stone; Stewart	3:54
3.	"Don't Start Lying to Me Now"	Chris Stapleton; Melissa Peirce; Stone	4:08
4.	"Last One to Know"	Stone; Stewart	4:52
5.	"Drive All Night"	Stone; Francis White	5:07
6.	"Cry Myself to Sleep"	Stone; Stewart	3:51
7.	"Somehow"	Stone; Stewart	3:04
8.	"Landlord"	Stone; Stewart	3:57
9.	"Boat Yard"	Stone	5:02
10.	"Take Good Care"	Paul Conroy; Stone	2:29

iTunes Store bonus tracks
No.	Title	Writer(s)	Length
11.	"Picnic for Two" (featuring Dave Stewart)	Stone; Stewart	4:14
12.	"Cutting the Breeze"	Stone; Stewart	3:39

Amazon Germany digital bonus track
No.	Title	Writer(s)	Length
11.	"Picnic for Two" (featuring Dave Stewart)	Stone; Stewart	4:14

Japanese edition bonus track
No.	Title	Writer(s)	Length
11.	"The Sound"	Stone; Stewart	3:29

== Personnel ==
Credits adapted from the liner notes of LP1.

=== Musicians ===
- Joss Stone – vocals
- Dave Stewart – guitar
- Chad Cromwell – drums, percussion
- Michael Rhodes – bass
- Tom Bukovac – guitar
- Dan Dugmore – pedal steel guitars
- Mike Rojas – keys
- Drea Rhenee – background vocals
- Wendy Moten – background vocals
- Luke Potter – additional guitars on "Karma"

=== Technical ===
- Dave Stewart – production
- Joss Stone – production, executive production
- Dave Kaplan – executive production
- Brian Nelson – executive production
- John McBride – engineering
- Steve Greenwell – mixing, additional engineering
- Tom Coyne – mastering at Sterling Sound (New York City)

=== Artwork ===
- Kristin Burns – photography
- Dave Stewart – cover photo
- Kevin Tetreault – layout, design

== Charts ==
=== Weekly charts ===
Weekly chart performance for LP1
Chart (2011)	Peak position
Australian Albums (ARIA)	58
Australian Jazz & Blues Albums (ARIA)	1
Austrian Albums (Ö3 Austria)	15
Belgian Albums (Ultratop Flanders)	12
Belgian Albums (Ultratop Wallonia)	39
Canadian Albums (Billboard)	15
Danish Albums (Hitlisten)	38
Dutch Albums (Album Top 100)	6
French Albums (SNEP)	46
German Albums (Offizielle Top 100)	5
Italian Albums (FIMI)	80
Japanese Albums (Oricon)	153
Portuguese Albums (AFP)	30
Scottish Albums (Official Charts)	58
Swiss Albums (Schweizer Hitparade)	2
UK Albums (Official Charts)	36
UK Independent Albums (Official Charts)	7
US Billboard 200	9
US Independent Albums (Billboard)	2
US Top R&B/Hip-Hop Albums (Billboard)	3

=== Year-end charts ===
Year-end chart performance for LP1
Chart (2011)	Position
Australian Jazz & Blues Albums (ARIA)	14
Swiss Albums (Schweizer Hitparade)	88
US Top R&B/Hip-Hop Albums (Billboard)	81

== Release history ==
Release dates and formats for LP1
Region	Date	Format	Label	Ref(s)
Portugal	21 July 2011	CD	Stone'd; Surfdog	
Germany	22 July 2011	CD; LP	Sony	
Germany	22 July 2011	Digital download	Stone'd; Surfdog	
Netherlands	22 July 2011	CD	Stone'd; Surfdog	
United Kingdom	24 July 2011	Digital download	Stone'd; Surfdog	
France	25 July 2011	CD	Universal	
France	25 July 2011	Digital download	Stone'd; Surfdog	
Italy	25 July 2011	Digital download	Stone'd; Surfdog	
Netherlands	25 July 2011	Digital download	Stone'd; Surfdog	
Portugal	25 July 2011	Digital download	Stone'd; Surfdog	
United Kingdom	25 July 2011	CD; LP	Stone'd; Surfdog	
Canada	26 July 2011	CD; digital download	Stone'd; Surfdog	
Italy	26 July 2011	CD	Edel	
United States	26 July 2011	CD; LP; digital download	Stone'd; Surfdog	
Australia	29 July 2011	CD; digital download	Universal	
Japan	24 August 2011	CD	Victor	
