= Stone'd Records =

British record label

- Founded: 2011
- Founder: Joss Stone
- Distributor(s): Surfdog; S-Curve; Universal Music Group; Membran Media
- Genre: Soul; R&B; ska; rock
- Country of origin: United Kingdom
- Location: Bristol
- Official website: stoned-records.com

Stone'd Records is a British independent record label founded by Grammy winning soul singer Joss Stone after her split from longtime label EMI. Stone has stated that the label is to be "a safe haven where great artists are free to do what they do best, create real music without compromise." At the time the label was set up, it was announced that longtime music executive Brian Nelson had been appointed General Manager of Stone'd Records and that the first signing besides Stone herself were Bristol based ska punk band Yes Sir Boss!.

== Current artists ==
- Joss Stone

== Former artists ==
- Yes Sir Boss

== Discography ==
=== Studio albums ===
List of albums, with selected chart positions, and certifications
Artist	Title	Album details	Peak chart positions										Sales	
Artist	Title	Album details	UK	AUS	AUT	BEL	CAN	FRA	GER	NLD	SWI	US	Sales	
Joss Stone	LP1	Released: 22 July 2011; Label: Stone'd/Surfdog; Formats: CD, LP, digital download	36	58	15	12	15	46	5	6	2	9	US: 200,000	
Joss Stone	The Soul Sessions Vol. 2	Released: 16 July 2012; Label: Stone'd/S-Curve; Formats: CD, LP, digital download	6	42	6	62	25	23	82	7		10		"—" denotes releases that did not chart or were not released in that country

=== Extended plays ===
Artist	Title	EP details
Yes Sir Boss	Desperation State EP	Released: 6 May 2012; Label: Stone'd; Formats: CD, digital download
