= Joss Stone =

English singer, songwriter, and actress (born 1987)

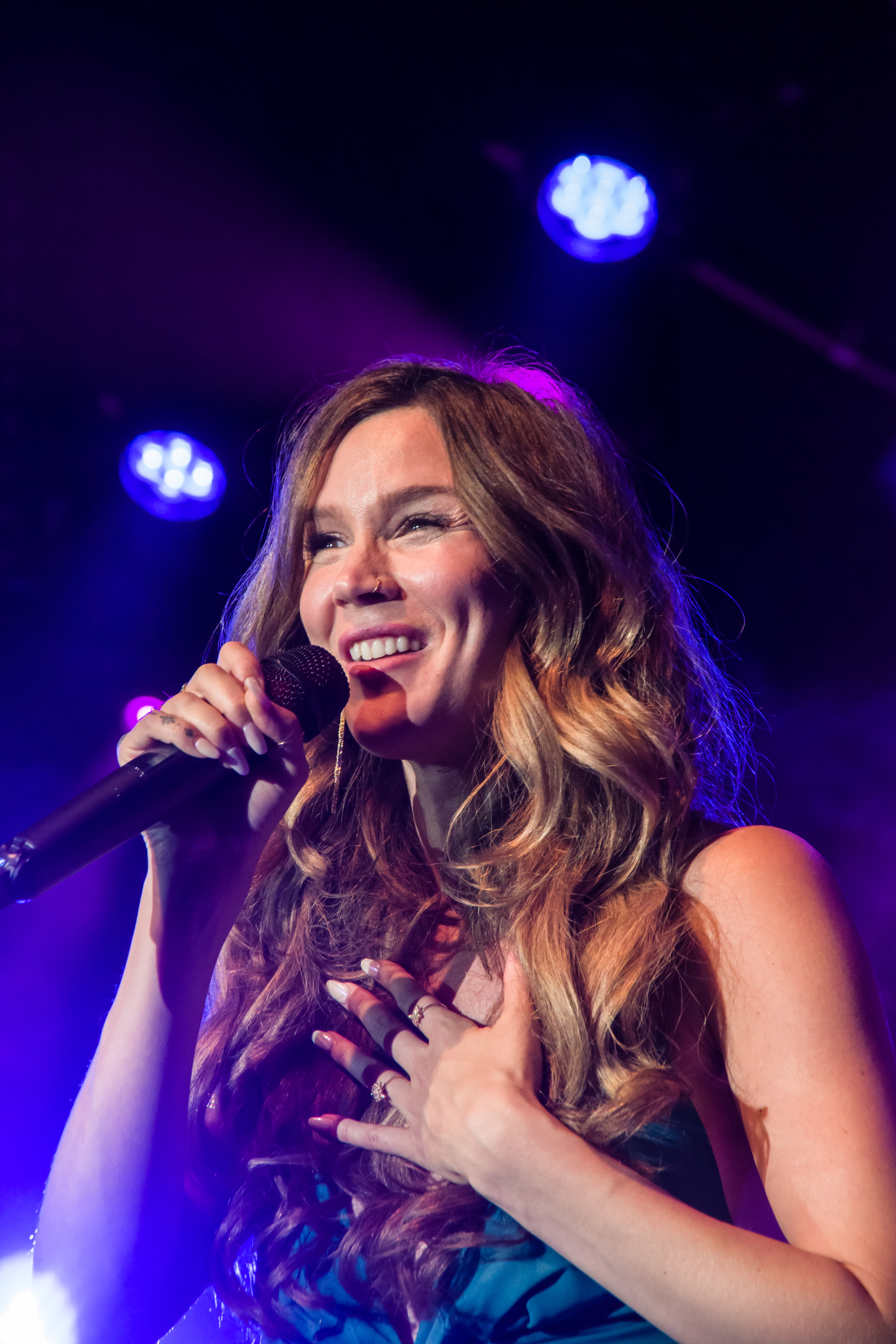
- Stone performing in 2023

Background information
- Born: Joscelyn Eve Stoker; 11 April 1987 (age 39); Dover, Kent, England
- Genres: R&B; soul; blue-eyed soul; reggae
- Occupations: Singer; songwriter; actress
- Years active: 2001–present
- Labels: Relentless; S-Curve; Virgin; Stone'd; Surfdog; Bay Street
- Formerly of: SuperHeavy
- Spouse: Cody DaLuz (m. 2023)
- Website: jossstone.com
- Children: 4

Joscelyn Eve Stoker (born 11 April 1987), known professionally as Joss Stone, is an English singer, songwriter, and actress. She rose to prominence in late 2003 with her multi-platinum debut album, The Soul Sessions, which made the 2004 Mercury Prize shortlist. Her second album, Mind Body & Soul (2004), topped the UK Albums Chart and spawned the top-ten single "You Had Me", Stone's most successful single on the UK Singles Chart to date. Both the album and single received one nomination at the 2005 Grammy Awards, while Stone herself was nominated for Best New Artist, and in an annual BBC poll of music critics, Sound of 2004, was ranked fifth as a predicted breakthrough act of 2004. She became the youngest British female singer to top the UK Albums Chart. Stone's third album, Introducing Joss Stone, released in March 2007, achieved gold record status by the Recording Industry Association of America (RIAA) and yielded the second-ever highest debut for a British female solo artist on the Billboard 200, and became Stone's first top-five album in the US.

Her two subsequent albums, Colour Me Free! and LP1, released in 2009 and 2011, respectively, also reached the top-ten on the Billboard 200 and saw moderate success worldwide. Throughout her career, Stone has sold 15 million records worldwide, establishing herself as one of the best-selling soul artists of the 2000s, and the best-selling British artists of her time. Her first three albums have sold over 2,722,000 copies in the US, while her first two albums have sold over 2 million copies in the UK.

Stone has earned several awards including two Brit Awards and one Grammy Award out of five nominations. She made her film acting debut in 2006 with the fantasy adventure film Eragon, and made her television debut portraying Anne of Cleves in the Showtime series The Tudors in 2009. Stone was the youngest woman on the 2006 Sunday Times Rich List—an annual list of the UK's wealthiest people—with £6 million. In 2012, her net worth was estimated to be £10 million, making her the fifth richest British musician under 30. Her sixth studio album, The Soul Sessions Vol. 2 (2012), became her fourth consecutive album to reach the top-ten on the Billboard 200. She followed this with Water for Your Soul (2015), a reggae inspired album which reached number one on the US Reggae Albums chart, and became the best-selling reggae album of the year in the country. Her eighth studio album, Never Forget My Love, was released in 2022, followed by her first Christmas album, Merry Christmas, Love, in the same year.

== Early life ==
Joscelyn Eve Stoker was born on 11 April 1987 at Buckland Hospital in Dover, Kent, and spent her teenage years in Ashill, a small village near Cullompton in Devon. She is the third of four children born to Wendy (née Skillin) and Richard Stoker. Her father owns a fruit and nut import–export business Western Commodities; her mother worked as Stone's manager until October 2004. Stone attended the Uffculme Comprehensive School, in Uffculme, Devon, where she first performed with a cover version of Jackie Wilson's 1957 song "Reet Petite". Stone has dyslexia and left school at age sixteen with three GCSE qualifications.

Stone grew up listening to a wide variety of music including 1960s and 1970s American R&B and soul music performed by such artists as Dusty Springfield and Aretha Franklin. As a result, she developed a soulful style of singing like her idols. "My first CD that I owned was Aretha Franklin: Greatest Hits. And I saw the advert on TV and it was just like little clips of her songs. I had no idea who she was—I was only like 10 so. I said, 'Oh yeah, that looks really good', so I wrote it down and I said to my mum, 'Can I have that for Christmas?' So she told my friend Dennis, who always gets me good music anyway, and he got that for me. So that was one of my first albums that I loved." She would later tell MTV News: "I kind of clicked into soul music more than anything else because of the vocals. You've got to have good vocals to sing soul music and I always liked it ever since I was little."

== Career ==
=== 2001–2003: Beginnings and The Soul Sessions ===
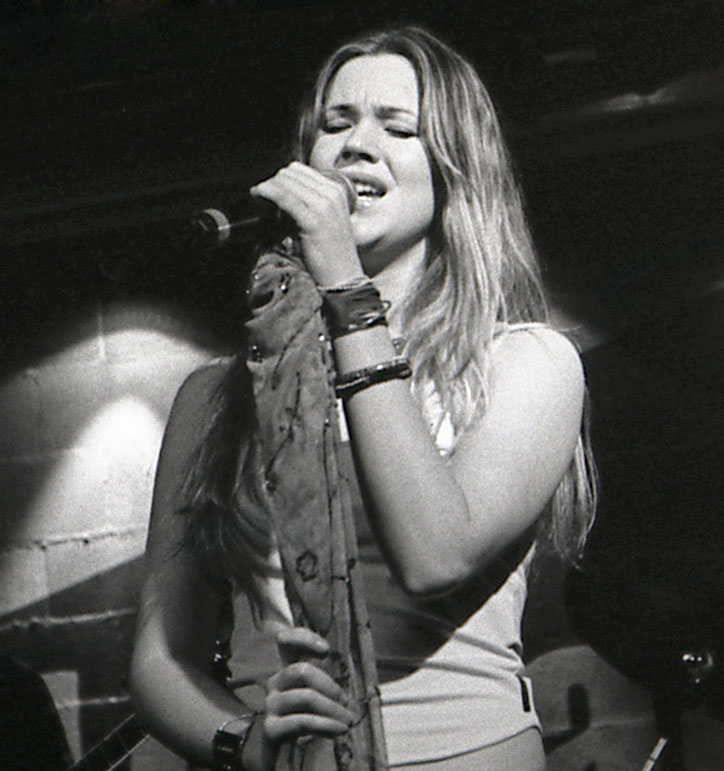
Stone performing live in Milan in 2005, during Mind, Body & Soul Sessions Tour

In 2001, aged 13, Stone auditioned for the BBC Television talent show Star for a Night in London, singing Aretha Franklin's 1968 Goffin-King hit "(You Make Me Feel Like) A Natural Woman" and Whitney Houston's 1999 single, "It's Not Right but It's Okay". After passing her audition, she sang Donna Summer's "On the Radio" for the broadcast, and eventually won the contest. She also appeared on and won Steps to the Stars (a TV programme hosted by H & Claire of the group Steps). Stone then performed on a charity show, where she drew the attention of the Boilerhouse Boys, composed of London-based producers Andy Dean and Ben Wolfe, who contacted S-Curve Records founder and CEO, Steve Greenberg in December 2001 telling him "they had just heard the greatest singer they'd ever heard from their country". In early 2002, Greenberg flew Stone to New York for an audition, in which she sang to backing tracks of classic soul songs: Otis Redding's 1968 "(Sittin' On) The Dock of the Bay", Gladys Knight & the Pips' 1973 "Midnight Train to Georgia", and Franklin's "(You Make Me Feel Like) A Natural Woman"; Greenberg instantly signed her to his label.

After being signed by S-Curve Records, her US market album was released by S-Curve Records and on the international market her album was released by EMI Music. Stone flew to Miami and Philadelphia to start work on her debut album, The Soul Sessions, released on 16 September 2003. She collaborated with people with solid credentials in the Miami soul scene such as Betty Wright, Benny Latimore, Timmy Thomas and Little Beaver as well as contemporary acts Angie Stone and the Roots. The album, produced by Steve Greenberg, Mike Mangini and Betty Wright, consists of little-known soul tracks by Franklin, Laura Lee, Bettye Swann and others. Released in late 2003, it reached the top five on the UK Albums Chart as well as the top forty of the US Billboard 200 chart. The lead single, "Fell in Love with a Boy", a reworking of the White Stripes' 2001 "Fell in Love with a Girl", reached the top 20 of the UK Singles Chart, as did the second single, a cover version of Sugar Billy's 1974 song "Super Duper Love (Are You Diggin' on Me)". The album eventually went triple platinum by the British Phonographic Industry in mid-April 2005 and gold by the Recording Industry Association of America in late March 2004.

=== 2004–2006: Mind Body & Soul and film debut ===
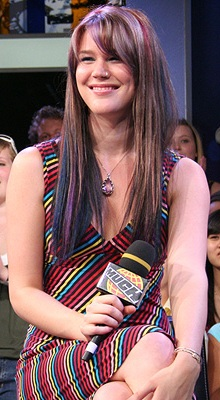
Joss Stone in 2007

After achieving critical acclaim with The Soul Sessions, Stone worked on new material, and recorded her second album, Mind Body & Soul, which was released on 28 September 2004, produced by the same team as her first album. She called the album her real debut. It debuted at No. one in the UK, breaking the record for the youngest female ever to top the UK Albums Chart, and just missed the top ten of the US Billboard 200 after peaking at No. 11. The lead single, "You Had Me", became her biggest hit to date when it rose to No. 9 in the UK. Follow-up singles "Right to Be Wrong" and "Spoiled" both made the top 40, and "Don't Cha Wanna Ride", the top 20. "Spoiled" landed just outside the top 50 of US Hot R&B/Hip-Hop Songs, peaking at No. 54. In early September 2005, Mind, Body & Soul was certified triple platinum by the BPI and platinum by the RIAA.

In April 2004, Stone performed during the VH1's benefit concert Divas Live 2004 alongside Ashanti, Cyndi Lauper, Gladys Knight, Jessica Simpson and Patti LaBelle, in support of the Save the Music Foundation. Stone joined Band Aid 20 on 14 November 2004 in benefit of Sudan's troubled Darfur region. The group, which included Coldplay lead singer Chris Martin and U2 lead singer Bono, re-recorded the 1984 song "Do They Know It's Christmas?", written by Band Aid organisers Bob Geldof and Midge Ure. Stone, who was born two years after the release of the original single, was not initially aware of who Bob Geldof was, with media reporting that she repeatedly referred to him as Bob Gandalf. Despite some criticism, the single became the UK's biggest-selling single of 2004 as well as the 2004 Christmas number-one single.

At the 2005 BRIT Awards, Stone won for British Female Solo Artist and British Urban Act—entering the Guinness World Records as the youngest BRIT Award solo winner at age seventeen, and was nominated for British Breakthrough Act. She also received a nomination for Best UK Act of the Year at the 2005 MOBO Awards, as well as three nominations for the 2005 Grammy Awards—Best New Artist, Best Female Pop Vocal Performance for "You Had Me", and Best Pop Vocal Album for Mind Body & Soul, where she sang with rock performer Melissa Etheridge, in tribute to blues-rock singer Janis Joplin. Their performance of "Cry Baby/Piece of My Heart" was released as a single, and through the aid of strong digital download sales, became Stone's first single to enter the US Billboard Hot 100, when it debuted and peaked at No. 32 the week of 2 April 2005.

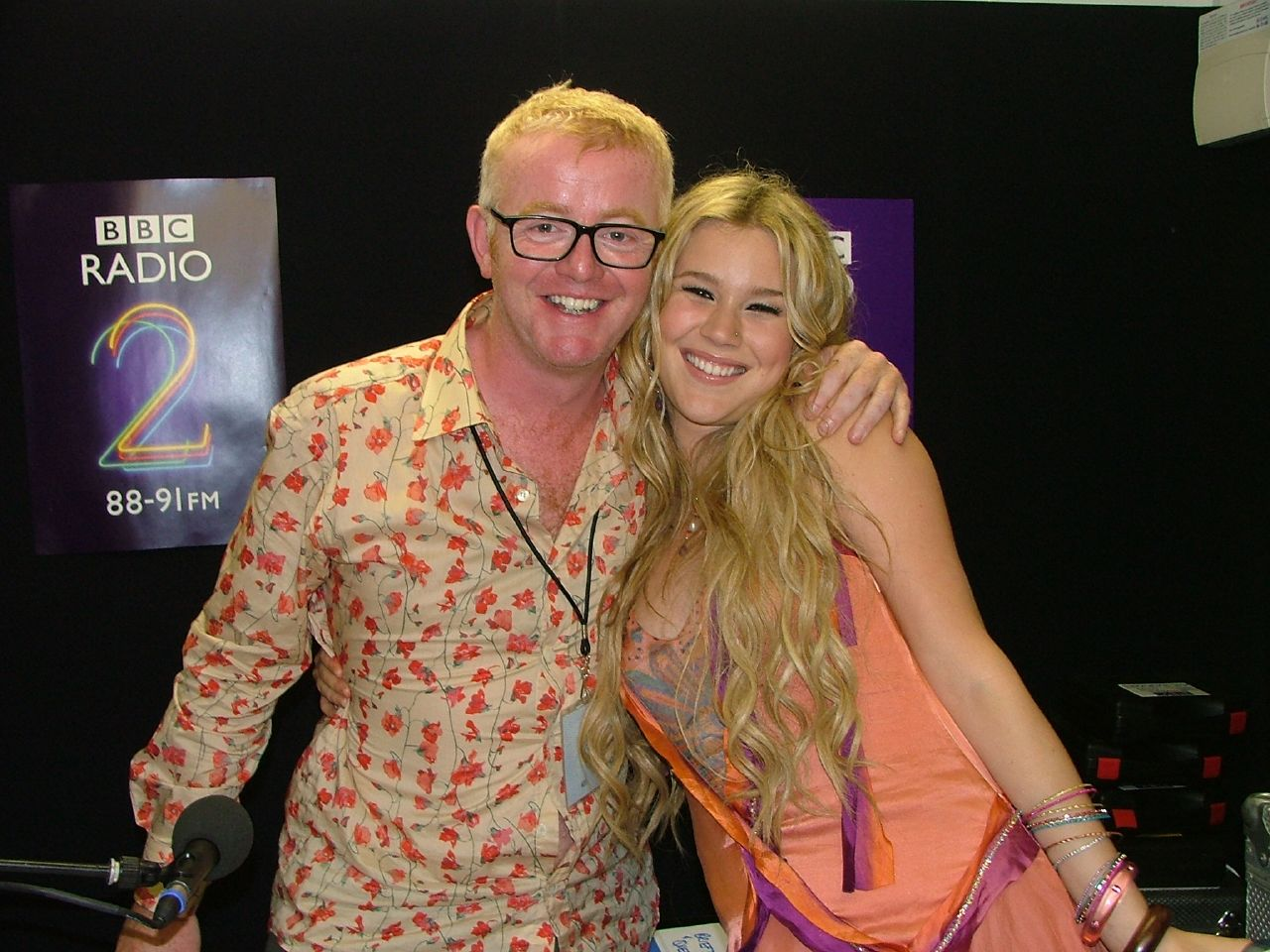
Stone with then BBC Radio 2 presenter Chris Evans in 2005

In March 2005, Stone was named the spokesperson for the Gap clothing company, replacing the actress Sarah Jessica Parker. She appeared in a television advertisement for that store chain singing a cover of Ray Charles's 1958 song "Night Time Is the Right Time" (retitled "The Right Time"). Stone also appeared in one of Gap's Fall 2005 "Favorites" commercials, singing the Beach Boys' 1966 song "God Only Knows". By that time, rumours circulated about her being dropped from the campaign because she was living with then-25-year-old songwriter and producer Beau Dozier (son of Motown producer and composer Lamont Dozier) in Los Angeles while she was only 17. However, Gap later denied the rumours, stating that they were very happy with Stone and telling BBC Radio 1 that the claims were "absolute tosh" and "a complete fabrication". On 11 April 2005, Stone performed "Spoiled", Rufus' 1974 song "Tell Me Something Good" with John Legend, Otis Redding's 1966 song "Try a Little Tenderness" with Donna Summer, and 1977's "Hot Legs" with Rod Stewart at "Save the Music: A Concert to Benefit the VH1 Save the Music Foundation", in benefit of VH1's Save the Music Foundation. Three months later, on 2 July 2005, Stone performed "Super Duper Love", "I Had a Dream", and "Some Kind of Wonderful" at the Live 8 concert at Hyde Park, London. Stone was an opening act for the Rolling Stones during their 2005 A Bigger Bang tour.

Stone performed a medley of "It's a Man's World" and "Papa's Got a Brand New Bag" with James Brown on BBC One's chat show Friday Night with Jonathan Ross on 1 July 2005. Stone collaborated with jazz pianist Herbie Hancock and blues singer-guitarist Jonny Lang on a cover of U2's 1988 song "When Love Comes to Town" for Hancock's 2005 album Possibilities. That same year, Stone was featured along with Sean Paul on Santana's "Cry Baby Cry", and worked on a remake of Patti LaBelle's 1985 song "Stir It Up" for the soundtrack to the Disney animated film Chicken Little. She also collaborated with Lemar in 2006 on his third studio album, The Truth About Love, on the track "Anniversary".

On 5 February 2006, Stone joined Stevie Wonder, India.Arie, and John Legend during the Super Bowl XL pre-game ceremonies to perform a medley of Wonder's hits. Three days later, on 8 February, on the night of the 2006 Grammy Awards, she helped perform a medley of Sly & the Family Stone's hits alongside Legend, Ciara, Maroon 5, will.i.am, Robert Randolph, Steven Tyler and Joe Perry. Stone made her film debut in the fantasy adventure film Eragon (based on the 2003 novel of the same name by Christopher Paolini), directed by Stefen Fangmeier and released on 15 December 2006, playing the fortune teller Angela. At the 2007 Grammy Awards, Stone shared the award for Best R&B Performance by a Duo or Group with Vocals for her collaboration with John Legend and Van Hunt on their 2005 cover of Sly & the Family Stone's 1971 chart-topper "Family Affair".

=== 2007–2008: Introducing Joss Stone ===
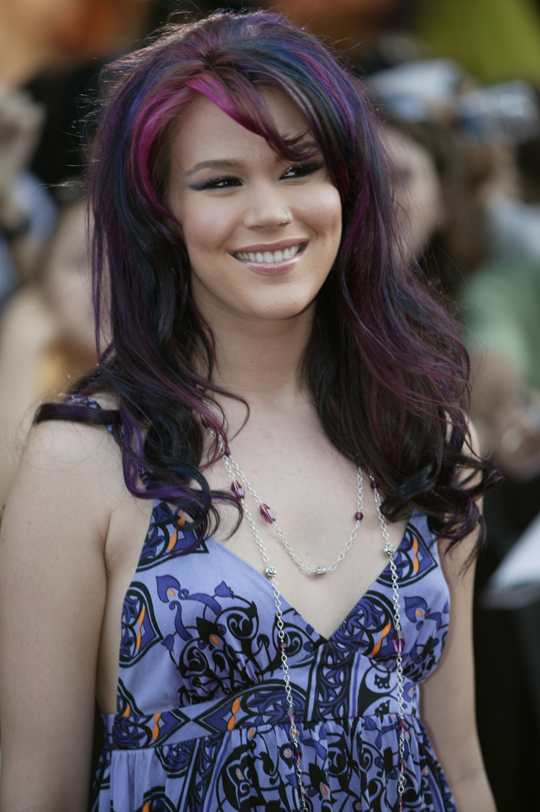
Stone at the Much Music Video Awards in 2007

Stone caused controversy at the 2007 BRIT Awards ceremony on 14 February 2007 while presenting the award for British Male Solo Artist (won by James Morrison). Speaking in an American accent, she circled the podium and gave a speech about Robbie Williams, who had been the target of earlier jokes made by host Russell Brand. Williams had been reported as going into rehabilitation that same week. As her speech continued, she made remarks about Brand, implying that he was heading for rehabilitation himself (while singing a passage of Amy Winehouse's hit "Rehab"). The following year, in response to the British media's negative reaction of her American accent, Stone said, "The words I say do not change. I'm not being a cruel person by sounding a different way. And I can't help it. I've been [in America working] since I was, like, 14."

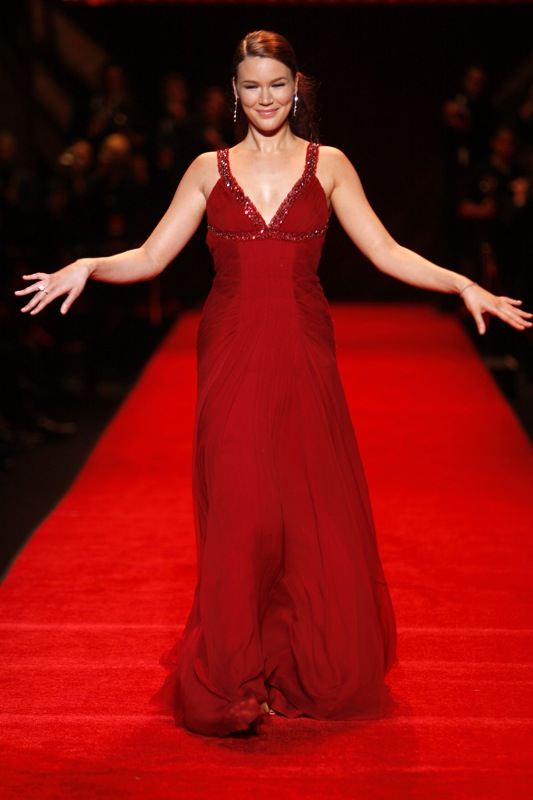
Stone walking at the Heart Truth charity fashion show 2008

Stone began work on her third studio album, Introducing Joss Stone, at Compass Point Studios in Nassau, Bahamas, in May 2006. Released on 12 March 2007, the album was coordinated by A&R Chris Anokute, produced by Raphael Saadiq, and included collaborations with Lauryn Hill, Common, and Joi. Virgin Records describes the album as "an electrifying mix of warm vintage soul, 1970s-style R&B, Motown girl-group harmonies, and hip-hop grooves". Stone herself describes it as "truly me. That's why I'm calling it Introducing Joss Stone. These are my words, and this is who I am as an artist." She also revealed on The Tavis Smiley Show that her break-up with Beau Dozier was a source of inspiration while writing Introducing Joss Stone. The album debuted and peaked at No. 12 on the UK Albums Chart, not managing to match the success of Stone's two previous albums. It nevertheless debuted at No. 2 on the Billboard 200 selling 118,000 copies in its first week, becoming the highest debut for a British solo female artist on the US chart, surpassing the record previously held by Amy Winehouse with Back to Black (which in turn would later be outdone by Leona Lewis, whose album Spirit debuted at No. 1 the week of 26 April 2008).

"Tell Me 'Bout It", the album's lead single, debuted and peaked at No. 28 on the UK Singles Chart. The second single, "Tell Me What We're Gonna Do Now", a collaboration with rapper Common, failed to chart inside the UK top seventy-five. Stone and Common turned the single's music video into a Product Red, reverting 100% of the gains from copies of the video purchased from iTunes to the Global Fund to Fight AIDS, Tuberculosis and Malaria. Stone is the first Product Red artist to do so. Stone also sampled Franklin's "Respect", taking the texture and sound of the song, but keeping her own composition. "Baby Baby Baby" was released digitally in December 2007 and physically in January 2008 as the third single. In support of the album, Stone embarked on a North American tour which began on 27 April at Foxwoods Resort Casino in Ledyard, Connecticut and ended on 13 June at the Filene Center in Vienna, Virginia, visiting sixteen cities in total including Philadelphia, San Francisco, Vancouver, Chicago, Toronto, New York and Boston. Two months later, she went on a North American late-summer tour which kicked off on 27 August at the Greek Theatre in Los Angeles and ended on 29 September at the Crossroads in Kansas City, Missouri, covering twelve cities—this time including Mexico City.

=== 2009–2010: Colour Me Free! and departure from EMI ===
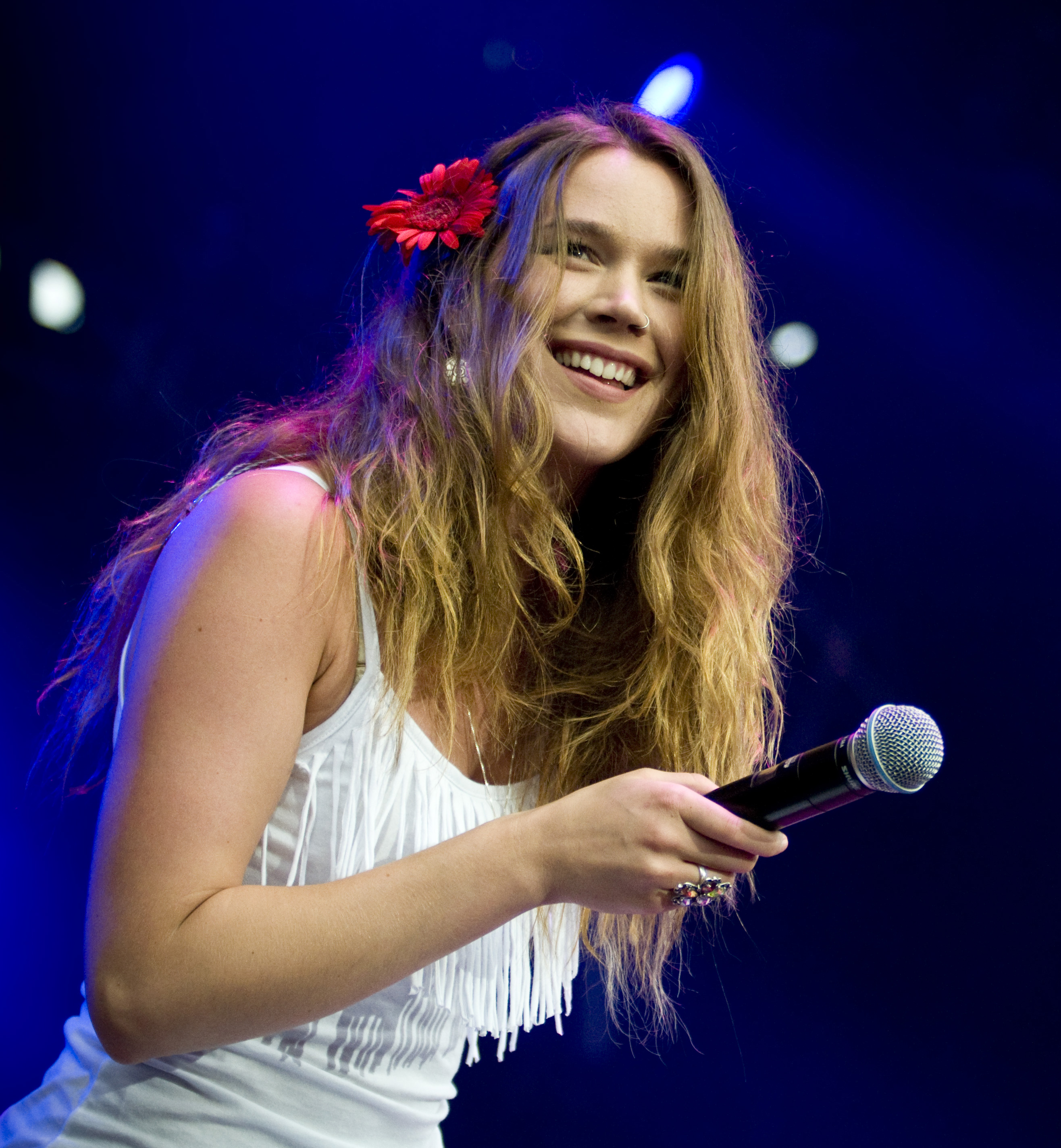
Stone at the Stockholm Jazz Festival in 2009

Stone was photographed by Canadian singer-guitarist and photographer Bryan Adams for Phonak's Hear the World initiative, whose main goal is to raise global awareness for the topic of hearing and hearing loss. On 7 July 2007, Stone performed at the South African leg of the Live Earth concerts at the Coca-Cola Dome in Johannesburg, to promote awareness of global warming. She sang the Introducing Joss Stone tracks "Girl They Won't Believe It", "Headturner", "Tell Me What We're Gonna Do Now", "Music", and "Tell Me 'bout It", as well as Mind, Body & Soul's "Right to Be Wrong" and "Gimme Shelter", the latter with Angélique Kidjo. In a 2022 interview, Stone said "Right to Be Wrong" is the song she is most attached to as she wrote it with late Betty Wright.

Stone covered Nat King Cole's 1965 song "L-O-V-E" for an advertising campaign for Chanel's Coco Mademoiselle fragrance.

On 29 November 2007, Stone joined Jeff Beck on a duet of the Impressions's 1965 song "People Get Ready" as part of his series of concerts at London's Ronnie Scott's Jazz Club, documented on the DVD Performing This Week: Live at Ronnie Scott's. To raise the awareness of AIDS, Annie Lennox joined forces with twenty-three female acts (including Stone) and recorded the song "Sing", which was released on World AIDS Day on 1 December 2007, when Lennox performed at one of Nelson Mandela's 46664 concerts at Johannesburg's Ellis Park Stadium. In mid-December 2007, Stone was named the new Flake girl to star in a series of television adverts for the Cadbury Schweppes product in the spring of 2008. According to the company, she is the first non-model to take the role.

In March 2008, Stone landed the role of lesbian bingo caller Stephanie in the British romantic comedy film Snappers, for which she also wrote music. However, the film was never released. Stone made her television debut portraying Henry VIII's fourth wife Anne of Cleves in the third season of the Showtime series The Tudors. She reprised the role in the show's final season in 2010, appearing in two episodes.

Stone launched a legal battle in a bid to leave her record label, EMI, and free her of her current three-album deal with the record label in April 2008. Stone performed at the 19th Annual GLAAD Media Awards at the Kodak Theatre in Hollywood, Los Angeles on 26 April 2008. She also performed "Right to Be Wrong" at the LA PRIDE 2008—produced by Christopher Street West, a non-profit organisation in West Hollywood, California, on 7 June 2008. On 26 October 2008, Stone sang the British national anthem, "God Save the Queen", before the NFL match between the San Diego Chargers and the New Orleans Saints, held at Wembley Stadium in London.

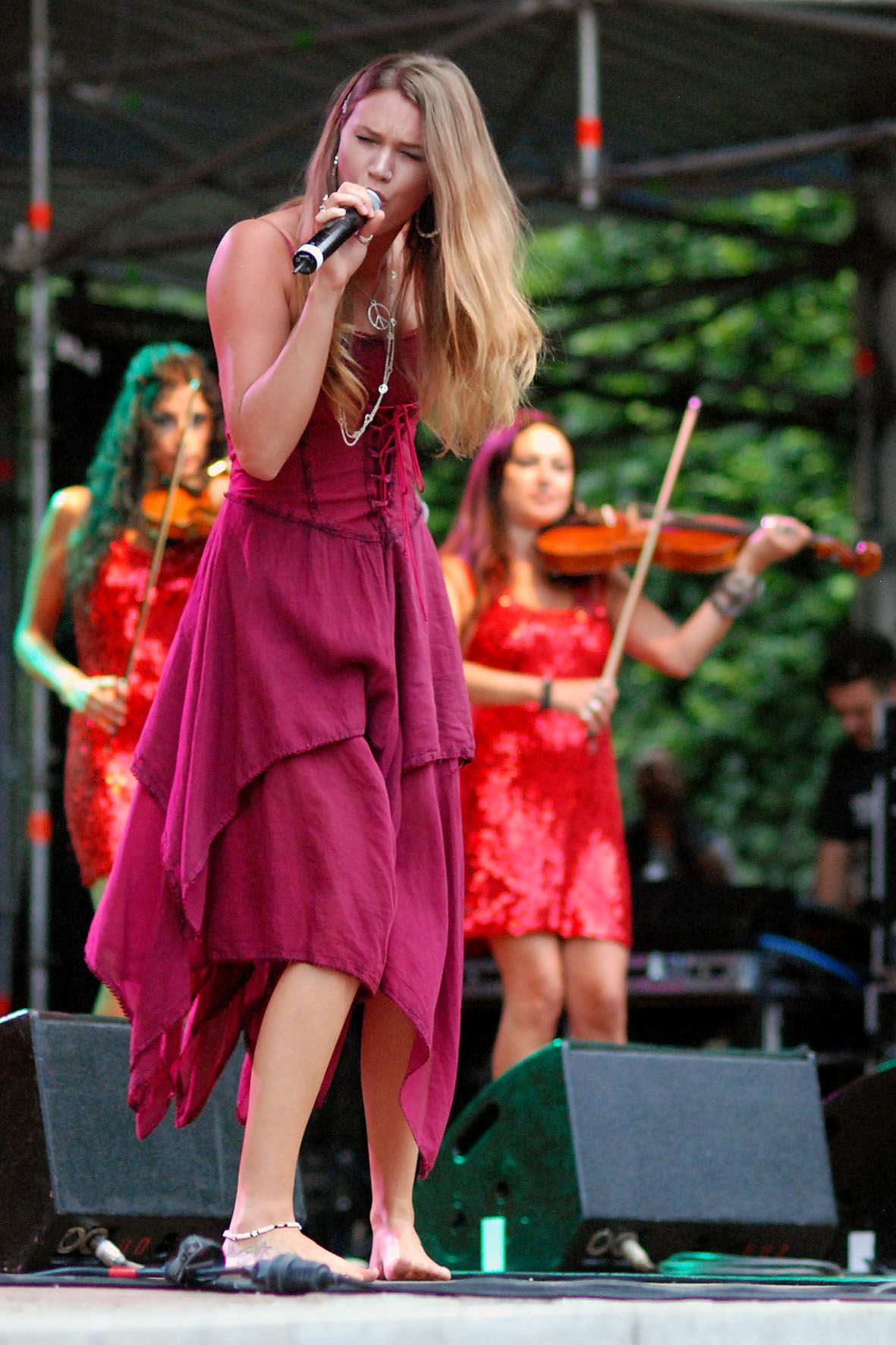
Stone performing during a festival, as part of the Colour Me Free! World Tour

On 7 December 2008, Stone performed the Who's 1965 song "My Generation" on CBS's Kennedy Center Honors TV special at the Kennedy Center, Washington, D.C., honouring Pete Townshend and Roger Daltrey. In 2010, Stone also appeared on Ringo Starr's album, Y Not on the song "Who's Your Daddy" in which she sang and co-wrote with the ex-Beatle; appeared on Jeff Beck's album, Emotion and Commotion on the songs "There's No Other Me" and "I Put a Spell on You", being the last one nominated for the Grammy Award for Best Rock Performance by a Duo or Group with Vocal at 53rd Grammy Awards. In late 2010, Stone's voice and likeness were used for the "Bond girl" character of Nicole Hunter, a jewellery designer and MI6 agent, in the video game James Bond 007: Blood Stone. In addition to portraying the character, she also performed the game's theme song, "I'll Take It All", which was co-written and performed with Dave Stewart.

In 2010, Stone provided vocals on two songs for the charity-focused audio drama production, A Voyage For Soldier Miles. The songs are "Lover Earth" written by Dave Stewart and Mark Warford and "Never Gonna Be The Same" written and performed by Mark Warford and Niels Lan Doky.

Stone's fourth studio album was written and recorded in about a week in Devon in early 2008. She said: "It's very, very raw. It's a bunch of musicians, writers and myself, and we're just jamming, basically." In promotion of the album, entitled Colour Me Free!, Stone played concerts throughout the UK in February and March. Originally scheduled for release in April 2009, Colour Me Free! was finally released on 20 October 2009. Stone said that her record company also fought her about the original cover of her new album, calling it "offensive". It was changed to simple text and no picture of Stone on the American edition. The original cover was used on the other editions worldwide. In late August 2010, it was reported that Stone had left EMI and formed her own independent record label, Stone'd Records. EMI announced in late December that they would be releasing a greatest hits album, The Best of Joss Stone 2003–2009. The compilation was released on 30 September 2011.

In 2010, Stone collaborated with Puerto Rican recording artist Ricky Martin for "The Best Thing About Me Is You", and peaked at No. 74 on the U.S. Billboard Hot 100 and which topped the Hot Latin Songs and Latin Pop Songs chart, this was Stone's first number-one on all two charts, which also made her the first Briton of non-Hispanic origin to reach No. 1 on the Hot Latin Tracks and Latin Pop Songs chart.

=== 2011–2018: LP1, The Soul Sessions Vol. 2 and Water for Your Soul ===
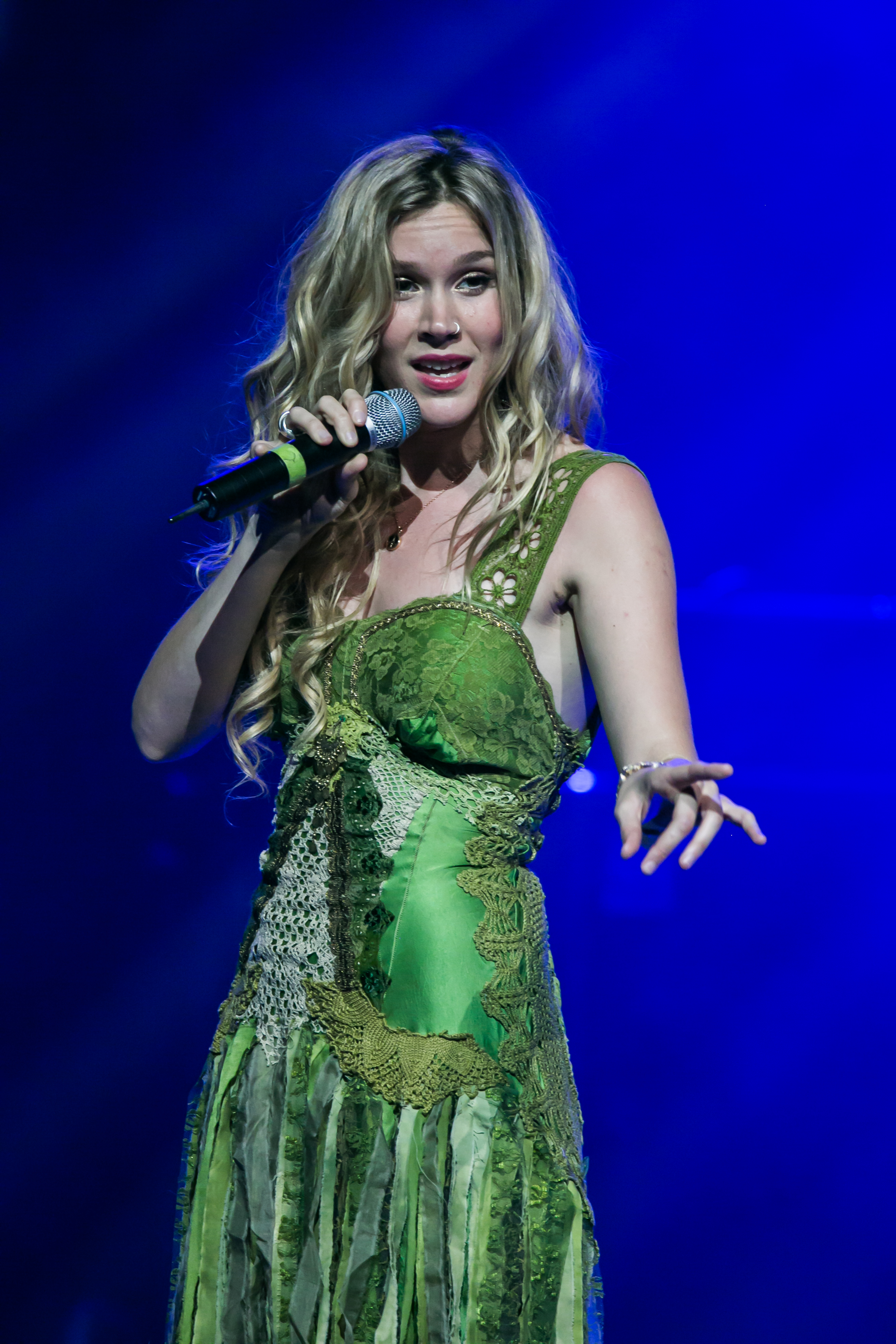
Stone performing in January 2016

On 14 June 2011, police arrested two men in Cullompton, Devon, near Stone's home, for plotting to rob and murder her. After a trial at Exeter Crown Court for conspiracy to rob, murder and commit grievous bodily harm against her, they were found guilty on 3 April 2013.

Stone partnered with Surfdog Records to release LP1 on 26 July 2011, through her own label Stone'd Records. The album was recorded in Nashville, Tennessee in six days, where Stone co-wrote and co-produced the album with Eurythmics co-founder, David Stewart The lead single, "Somehow", was released on 24 June 2011. Stone also joined the supergroup SuperHeavy which was formed by Mick Jagger of the Rolling Stones, together with Dave Stewart (credited by Mick with the original idea of SuperHeavy), Damian Marley (the youngest son of Bob Marley) and the Indian musician and producer A.R. Rahman. The album was recorded at Jim Henson Studios in Los Angeles and was released on 20 September 2011 by A&M Records. The debut single, "Miracle Worker", was released on 19 July 2011.

Released in July 2012, The Soul Sessions Vol. 2 saw Stone return to her original label, S-Curve Records, who released the album jointly with the artist's Stone'd Records, and features production from Steve Greenberg (producer of the first "Soul Sessions"). The album finds Stone largely covering lesser-known soul songs from the 1970s and 1980s by acts including the Chi-Lites, the Honey Cone, the Dells, Sylvia, Labi Siffre and Linda Lewis. The album reached the top 10 on the US Billboard 200 and the UK album chart. In the UK it was her first top 10 album since 2004's Mind Body & Soul. In 2013 she performed live shows including Indonesia and the Philippines. She also made an appearance on UK television series Top Gear.

Stone announced to newspaper La Vanguardia in July 2012 that she would work on a reggae album. She stated that it would be recorded and produced by her and Damian Marley, who previously worked in SuperHeavy. In March 2014, she elaborated that the new album would be a little bit different and "more eclectic" with a "little bit more hip-hop and reggae". On 31 July 2015 her album Water for Your Soul was released, and was the number-one reggae album the week it came out. In April 2014 she began the Total World Tour with the intention of performing in as many countries as possible. In November 2017 Stone, along with Nitin Sawhney, Jonathan Shorten, Jonathan Joseph and Cameroonian multi-instrumentalist Étienne M'Bappé released the Project Mama Earth, an 11-track EP comprising full-length songs and interludes, inspired by Mother Nature concept and African rhythms. In the same month, she was co-headliner in Night of the Proms in Nederland and Belgium. In October 2018, Stone was cast as a guest-star in season 5 of musical drama television series Empire.

=== 2019–2022: Finishing of the Total World Tour and Never Forget My Love ===
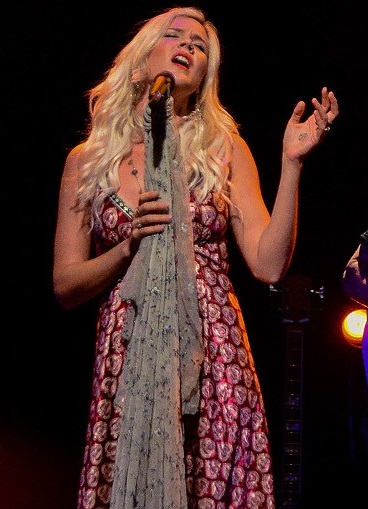
Stone performing in São Paulo, Brazil, December 2018

At the beginning of 2019 Stone sang with James Morrison on the song "My Love Goes On", making it four years since both singers last released studio albums.

In 2019, Stone finished her six-year Total World Tour. She performed in 190 countries and received the first World Tour Certification, alongside with the Guinness World Record for "Most UN member states visited by a musician on a world tour". To perform in every country of the world, she crossed into Syria illegally in March to perform at Al-Malikiyah. Later the same month, she performed in Turkmenistan and North Korea. In July 2019, Stone was denied entry into Iran, the last stop on her tour.

In April 2020, Stone's single "Lean On Me" was released, the song was sung with Beverley Knight, for which a music video was made showing the work of National Health Service helpers.

In August 2020, Stone became the host of a podcast, A Cuppa Happy, in which she aims to better understand the elusive, fleeting nature of happiness.

In February 2021, Stone won the second series of The Masked Singer masked as Sausage. Stone gave a live interview on ITV's This Morning, beamed from her Nashville, Tennessee, home on 15 February 2021, to discuss her winning performance on Series 2 of The Masked Singer, which attracted 8.6 million viewers over Valentine's weekend. The finale was recorded while she was heavily pregnant in September 2020. Her singing character was disguised in a sausage and chips suit, with her true identity kept secret until she was revealed as the second series winner.

On 11 November 2021, she released "Never Forget My Love", for which a video was shot immediately, the lead single and title track from her new album, released on 11 February 2022.

=== 2023–present: 20 Years of Soul - the 20th anniversary; a new direction: disco music ===
In 2023, Stone celebrated the 20th anniversary of her career, embarking on a European tour to perform at several summer festivals.

In October 2024, she revealed on The Allison Hagendorf Show that she had begun working on a new album based on her daughter's idea, which would be in the genre of disco music. The album is expected to be released in 2025. As she said: "I figured soul music is sort of just where I'm comfortable and I think disco that's soul, it's just faster".

== Artistry ==
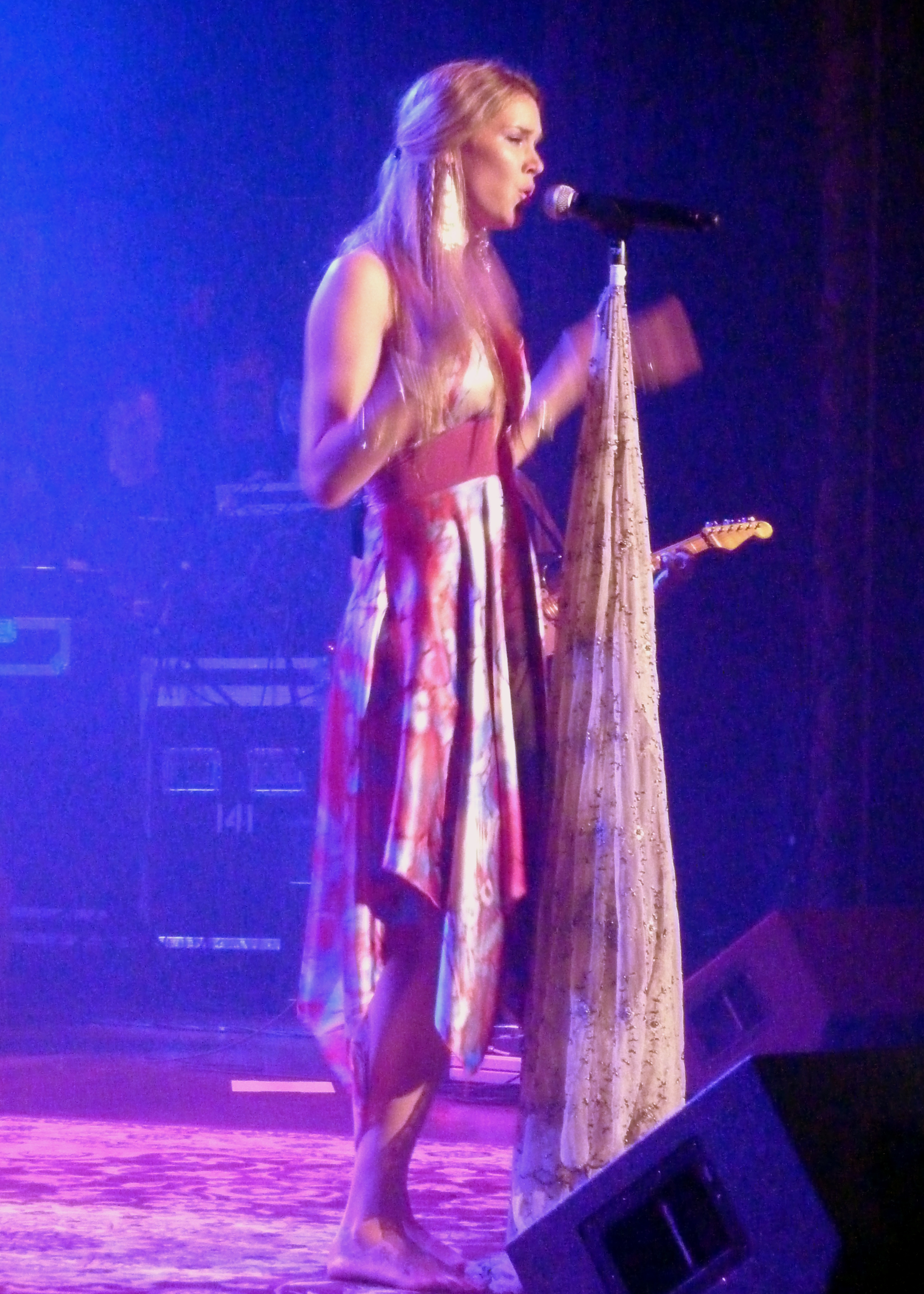
Joss Stone performing barefoot on stage

Stone possesses the vocal range of a mezzo-soprano and contralto. She often performs barefoot and has been described as "the white Aretha Franklin" since her debut in music industry. However, Stone was the subject of some contention in the United States, according to Alexis Petridis, writing in The Guardian in 2003, where, he claims, her audience expected soul artists "to have been born in poverty and have had a rough and painful life" in order to sing soul music due to its emotional nature.

== Personal life ==
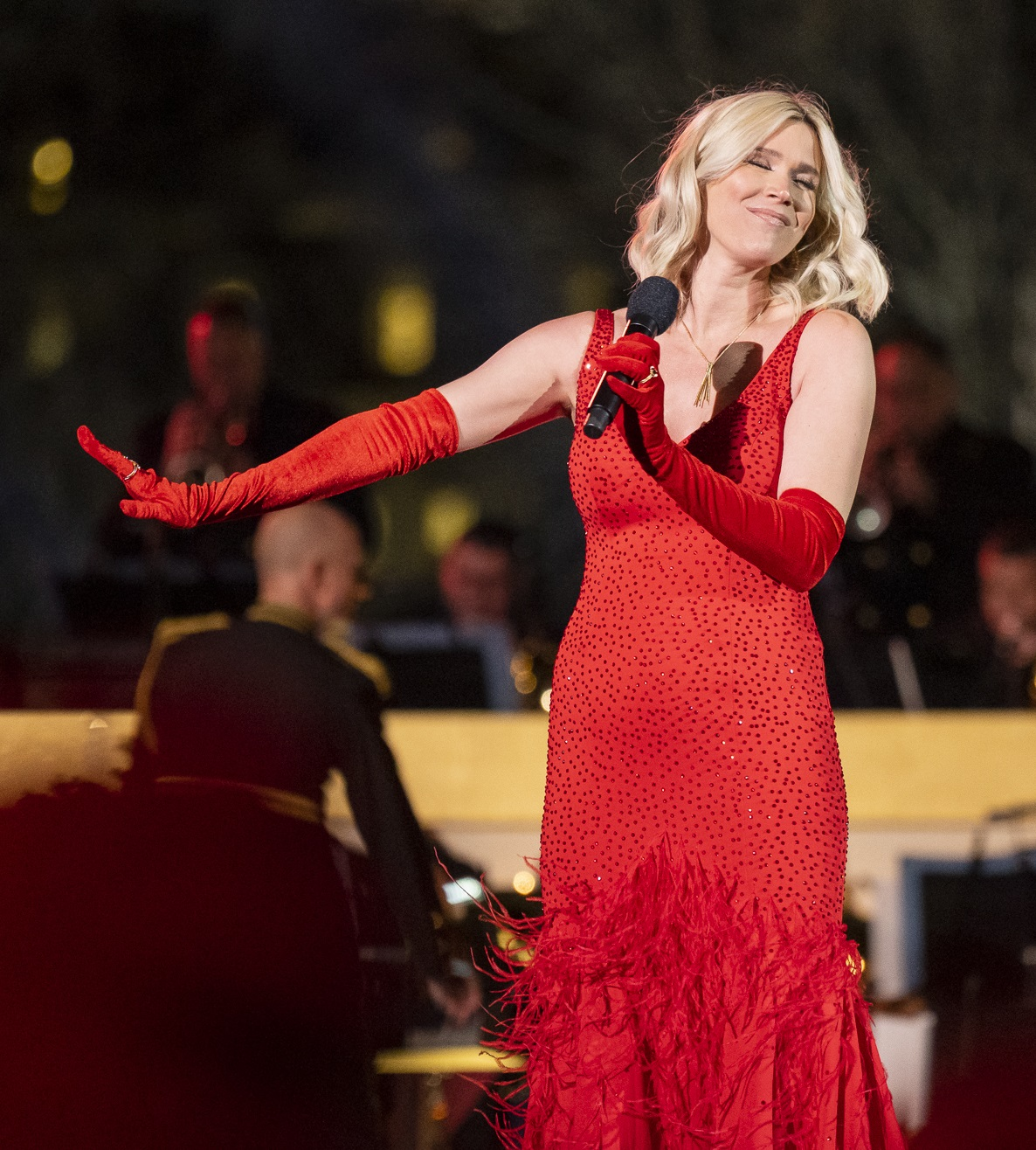
Washington, D.C., USA, 2022

In 2004, Stone began dating Beau Dozier, with whom she co-wrote the song "Spoiled". Dozier is the son of Motown producer Lamont Dozier, part of the team Holland-Dozier-Holland. The couple ended their relationship in November 2005.

In a 2016 interview, Stone revealed that she had been in a relationship with music promoter SiChai for three years.

Stone is a lifelong vegetarian. She owns a number of rescue dogs.

The Joss Stone Foundation ultimately supported more than 200 charities across the globe as Stone completed her world tour. The primary aim was to help raise public awareness and support for these charities.

In 2021, she was awarded The National German Sustainability Award.

In September 2020, Stone announced via Instagram that she was pregnant with her first child with boyfriend Cody DaLuz. She gave birth to a daughter on 29 January 2021. In April 2022, Stone announced via Instagram that she was pregnant with her second child with DaLuz. She gave birth to her second child on 18 October 2022, a son. Stone relocated to Nashville, Tennessee, in 2022. In October 2023, Stone married DaLuz.

In early December 2024, Stone adopted a baby boy. On 19 December 2024, Stone announced she was pregnant for the third time with their fourth child. Her daughter was born in June 2025.

== Discography ==
- The Soul Sessions (2003)
- Mind Body & Soul (2004)
- Introducing Joss Stone (2007)
- Colour Me Free! (2009)
- LP1 (2011)
- The Soul Sessions Vol. 2 (2012)
- Water for Your Soul (2015)
- Never Forget My Love (2022)
- Merry Christmas, Love (2022)

== Tours ==
- Mind, Body & Soul Sessions Tour (2003–2005)
- Introducing Joss Stone World Tour (2007–2008)
- Colour Me Free! World Tour (2009–2011)
- LP1 World Tour (2011)
- Total World Tour (2014–2019)
- 20 Years of Soul (2023)
- Ellipsis (2024–2025)
- Less Is More (2025–2026)

== Filmography ==
List of film credits
Year	Title	Role	Notes
2005	An Evening of Stars: Tribute to Quincy Jones	Herself	TV film
2006	Eragon	Angela	Film debut
2007	Park City: Where Music Meets Film	Herself	TV film
2008	Snappers	Stephanie	TV film; the film was never released
2008	An Evening of Stars: Tribute to Smokey Robinson	Herself	TV film
2010	The Funeral Planner	Eve Gardner	Video short
2018	Tomorrow	Mandy	TV film

List of television credits
Year	Title	Role	Notes
2001	Star for a Night	Herself/Contestant	"Junior Star for a Night"
2003	Kennedy Center Honors	Herself	Tribute to James Brown
2004	Austin City Limits	Herself	Season 30, episode 4
2005	American Dreams	Singer in the Lair	Episode: "Starting Over"
2005	Punk'd	Herself	Season 4, episode 6
2008	Kennedy Center Honors	Herself	Tribute to Pete Townshend and Roger Daltrey
2009	American Dad!	Voice	One episode
2009–2010	The Tudors	Anne of Cleves	5 episodes; seasons 3–4
2013	Top Gear	Herself	Series 20, Episode 1
2015	Grace and Frankie	Performer of song "Free Me"	guest-star
2017	Nigella: At My Table	Herself	TV programme
2018–2019	Empire	Wynter	3 episodes
2020–2021	The Masked Singer UK	Contestant	Series 2; winner of the series

List of video games credits
Year	Title	Role	Notes
2010	James Bond 007: Blood Stone	Nicole Hunter	Voice

== Awards and nominations ==
During her career, Stone won nine awards, including one Grammy Award and two Brit Awards.

Award	Year	Nominee(s)	Category	Result	Ref.
Brit Awards	2005	Herself	British Urban Act	Won	
Brit Awards	2005	Herself	British Female Solo Artist	Won	
Brit Awards	2005	Herself	British Breakthrough Act	Nominated	
Children's and Family Emmy Awards	2022	Paper Birds	Outstanding Interactive Media	Nominated	
Game Audio Network Guild Awards	2011	"I'll Take It All"	Best Original Vocal Song – Pop	Won	
German Sustainability Awards	2021	Herself	German Sustainability Awards	Won	
Grammy Awards	2005	Herself	Best New Artist	Nominated	
Grammy Awards	2005	Mind Body & Soul	Best Pop Vocal Album	Nominated	
Grammy Awards	2005	"You Had Me"	Best Female Pop Vocal Performance	Nominated	
Grammy Awards	2007	"Family Affair" (with John Legend and Van Hunt)	Best R&B Performance by a Duo or Group with Vocals	Won	
Grammy Awards	2011	"I Put a Spell on You" (with Jeff Beck)	Best Rock Performance by a Duo or Group with Vocal	Nominated	
Groovevolt Music and Fashion Awards	2005	Herself	Best New Artist	Won	
Groovevolt Music and Fashion Awards	2006	Mind Body & Soul	Best Pop Album - Female	Nominated	
MOBO Awards	2004	Mind Body & Soul	Best Album	Nominated	
MOBO Awards	2004	Herself	UK Act of the Year	Nominated	
MOBO Awards	2005	Herself	UK Act of the Year	Nominated	
MOBO Awards	2007	Herself	Best UK Female	Nominated	
MOBO Awards	2015	Herself	Best R&B/Soul Act	Nominated	
Meteor Music Awards	2005	Herself	Best International Female	Nominated	
NRJ Music Awards	2005	Herself	International Breakthrough of the Year	Nominated	
Pop Awards	2020	"My Love Goes On" (with James Morrison)	Song of the Year	Nominated	
Pop Awards	2023	Herself	Female Artist of the Year	Nominated	
Virgin Media Music Awards	2007	Herself	Most Fanciable Female	Nominated	
Virgin Media Music Awards	2007	Herself	Disaster of the Year	Nominated	

Year	Association	Category	Nominated work	Result	Ref.
2004	Mercury Prize	Album of the Year	The Soul Sessions	Nominated	
2004	Teen Choice Awards	Choice R&B Track	"Fell in Love with a Boy"	Nominated	
2004	IFPI Hong Kong Top Sales Music Awards	Top 10 Best Selling Foreign Albums	Mind Body & Soul	Won	
2004	Glamour Women of the Year Awards	Newcomer of the Year	Herself	Won	
2004	Žebřík Music Awards	Best International Surprise	Herself	Nominated	
2004	HUMO's Pop Poll de Luxe	Best International Female Singer	Herself	Won	
2004	Sound of...	Sound of 2004	Herself	Fifth	
2005	Capital FM Award	London's Favourite UK Album	Mind Body & Soul	Won	
2010	GMA Dove Awards	Special Event Album of the Year	Oh Happy Day: An All-Star Music Celebration	Nominated	
2013	Soul Train Music Awards	Centric Certified Award	Herself	Nominated	
2015	Lunas del Auditorio	Jazz Y Blues	Herself	Nominated	
2021	The Masked Singer UK	'Sausage' contestant	Herself	Won	

== See also ==
- List of barefooters
