= LP1 World Tour =

2011 concert tour by Joss Stone

- Tour by Joss Stone
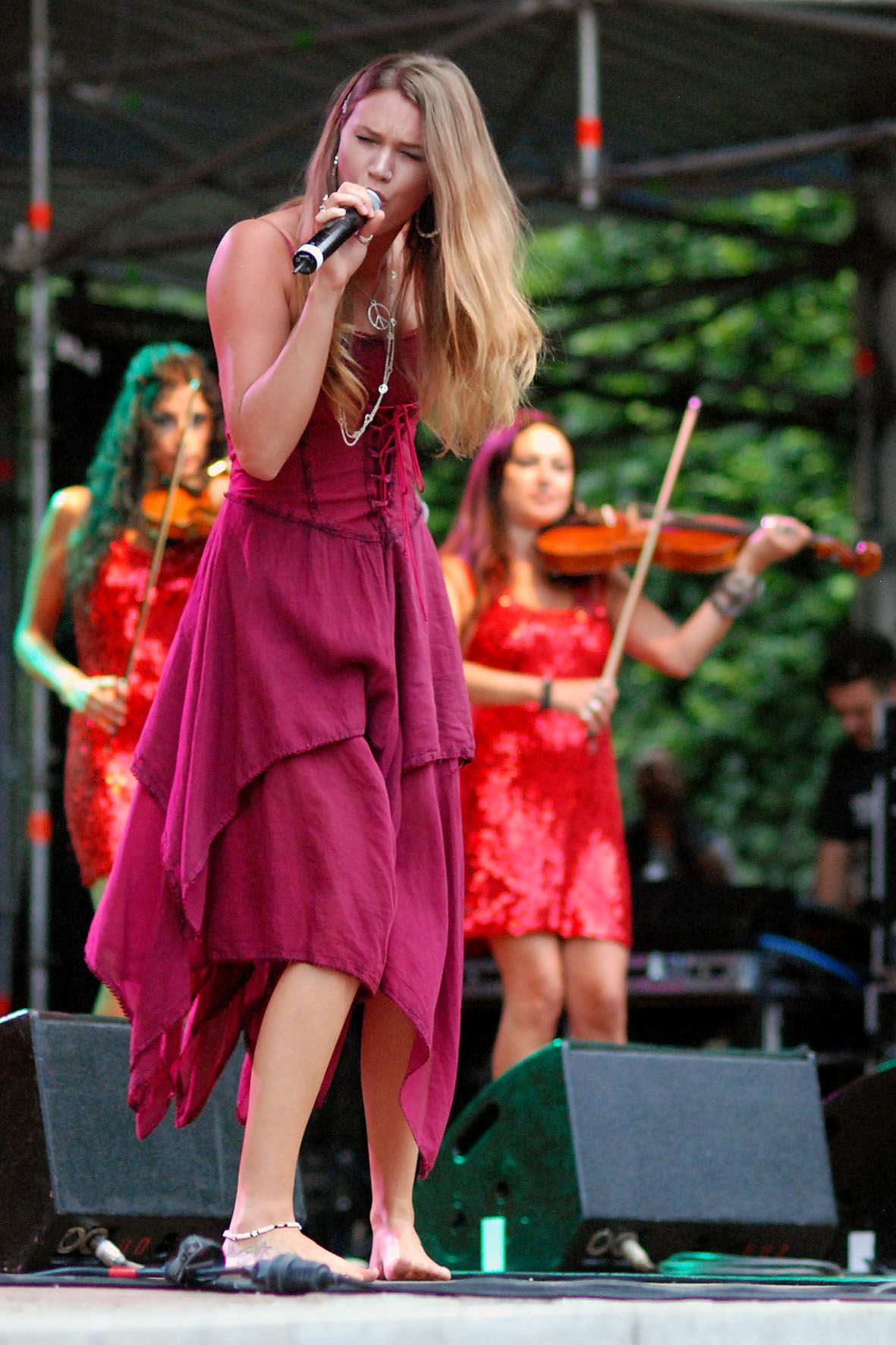
- Associated album: LP1
- Start date: 25 July 2011
- No. of shows: 5 in Europe; 2 in South America; 1 in Oceania; 8 in total

Joss Stone concert chronology
- Colour Me Free! World Tour (2009–2011); LP1 World Tour (2011); Total World Tour (2014–2019)

LP1 World Tour was the fifth concert tour by the English singer-songwriter Joss Stone in support of her fifth album, LP1 (2011).

== Setlist ==
1. "You Had Me"
2. "Free Me"
3. "Somehow"
4. "Last One to Know"
5. "Super Duper Love (Are You Diggin' on Me)"
6. "Boat Yard"
7. "Put Your Hands on Me"/"Baby Baby Baby"
8. "Tell Me What We're Gonna Do Now"
9. "Drive All Night"
10. "Landlord"
11. "Don't Start Lying to Me Now"
12. "Bruised but Not Broken"
13. "Could Have Been You"
14. "Fell in Love with a Boy"
15. "Tell Me 'bout It"
  Encore
16. "Take Good Care"
17. "Newborn"
18. "Big 'Ol Game"

== Tour dates ==
Date	City	Country	Venue
Europe
25 July 2011	Amsterdam	Netherlands	Paradiso
26 July 2011	Antwerp	Belgium	Rivierenhof
28 July 2011	Istanbul	Turkey	Santral Istanbul
30 July 2011^{[A]}	Lisbon	Portugal	Praça do Comércio
South America
29 September 2011^{[B]}	Rio de Janeiro	Brazil	Parque Olímpico Cidade do Rock
4 October 2011^{[C]}	São Paulo	Brazil	Espaço Villa-Lobos
Oceania
22 October 2011^{[D]}	Melbourne	Australia	Kings Domain Garden
Europe
30 October 2011^{[E]}	London	England	Savoy Theatre

Festivals and other miscellaneous performances

^{A} This concert is a part of Festival dos Oceanos.
^{B} This concert is a part of Rock in Rio.
^{C} This concert is a part of 11th Anniversary the Magazine QUEM.
^{D} This concert is a part of Sidney Myer Music Bowl.
^{E} This concert is a part of Terry Wogan's Children in Need.
