= Live Earth concert, Johannesburg =

Concert event

Live Earth
- Location: Coca-Cola Dome, Johannesburg South Africa
- Date: July 7, 2007

The Live Earth concert in South Africa was held at the Coca-Cola Dome, South Africa on 7 July 2007. The event venue was originally scheduled for Cradle of Humankind, Maropeng in Johannesburg.

== Running order ==
- South African Drum Cafe Team - "Zimbabwe Drum Rhythm" (JB 2:18)
- Danny K and The Soweto Gospel Choir - "Something Inside So Strong", "Homeless", "Real Man", "Unfrozen", "Shorty" (JB 17:00)
- Baaba Maal - "African Woman", "Gorel", "Mbaye" (JB 17:45)
- Zola - "Ghetto Scandalous", "Mzion", "Nomhle", "Mdlwembe", "Don't Cry" (JB 18:30)
- The Parlotones - "Dragonflies and Astronauts", "Overexposed", "Here Comes a Man", "Louder Than Bombs" (JB 19:15)
- Vusi Mahlasela - "Thulamama/Red Song", "When You Come Back", "River Jordan" (JB 20:00)
- Angelique Kidjo - 2 songs with unknown titles, "Afrika", "Tumba", "Gimme Shelter" (duet with Joss Stone) (JB 20:45)
- Joss Stone - "Girl They Won't Believe It", "Headturner","Tell Me What We're Gonna Do Now", "Music", "Tell Me 'Bout It", "Right To Be Wrong" (JB 21:30)
- UB40 - "Food For Thought", "Who You Fighting For", "One in Ten", "Kingston Town", "Kiss and Say Goodbye", "Red Red Wine", "Higher Ground", "Wear You To The Ball", "Sing Our Own Song", "Johnny Too Bad", "So Here I Am", "Can't Help Falling in Love" (JB 22:15)

Presenters:

- Naomi Campbell
- DJ Suga

== Coverage ==
=== Online ===
MSN was responsible for the online broadcasting of the concert.
