= Be Here (disambiguation) =

Be Here album by Keith Urban 2004

- Be Here, album by Rachel Platten 2011
- "Be Here", song by Raphael Saadiq from Instant Vintage 2002
