= Colour Me Free! =

2009 studio album by Joss Stone

Studio album by Joss Stone
- Released: 20 October 2009
- Recorded: 2008
- Studios: Mama Stone's (Wellington, England) (Note: Tracks 1–5 and 12); Blakeslee Recording Co. (North Hollywood, California) (Note: Track 9; additional recording on tracks 1–4; strings on tracks 2, 5 and 12); Blue 52 Lounge (North Hollywood, California) (Note: Additional recording on track 3); Jeff Beck's home studio (London); Legacy (New York City) (Note: Tracks 6 and 10); Titan (London) (Note: Track 7); Maida Vale (London) (Note: Track 8); Electric Lady (New York City) (Note: Track 9); Kensaltown (London) (Note: Track 11); Apollo (Dublin) (Note: Additional recording on track 11); Human (New York City) (Note: Strings on track 11); The Studio (Philadelphia) (Note: Additional recording on track 12)
- Genre: Soul
- Length: 52:29
- Label: Virgin
- Producers: Jamie Hartman; Dan Mackenzie; Phil Ramone; Conner Reeves; Raphael Saadiq; Jonathan Shorten; Sacha Skarbek; Joss Stone

Joss Stone chronology
Introducing Joss Stone (2007)	Colour Me Free! (2009)	LP1 (2011)

Alternative cover
- North American cover

Singles from Colour Me Free!
- 1. "Free Me" Released: 22 September 2009

Colour Me Free! is the fourth studio album by English singer and songwriter Joss Stone, released on 20 October 2009 by Virgin Records. The album was originally scheduled to be released in April 2009. However, Stone's record label, EMI, delayed it to July and again to 20 October. "Free Me" was released on 22 September 2009 as the only single from the album. In the United States, the album's physical and digital releases were made available exclusively through Target and iTunes, respectively. Colour Me Free! features guest appearances by Raphael Saadiq, Nas, Jeff Beck, Sheila E., David Sanborn and Jamie Hartman from Ben's Brother.

Despite some criticism towards its ballads, the album was met with generally positive reviews from music critics, who lauded its sonic direction and Stone's vocals. Colour Me Free! peaked at number 75 on the UK Albums Chart, becoming Stone's lowest-peaking album in the United Kingdom. It debuted at number 10 on the US Billboard 200, selling 27,000 units in its first week. The song "4 and 20" was included on the soundtrack to the 2010 romantic comedy film Valentine's Day, and "Big Ol' Game" was originally included as a bonus track on Introducing Joss Stone.

== Background and recording ==
Stone began writing songs with Jonathan Shorten and Conner Reeves in Devon in early 2008. Since they did not have a studio or any musicians, she paid a visit to Mama Stone's, a music venue that her mother was building at an old house in Wellington, Somerset, using the downstairs level as a performance space and the upstairs portion as writing rooms and a recording studio. After noticing a vocal booth recently finished by construction crews, Stone was inspired to record an album. "I woke up the next day and it was like, 'I want to make an album and I don't want to think about it, I don't want to collect songs. I want to make it—now!'", Stone said.

Stone called her assistant and asked for her touring musicians, who flew from the United States to Devon the following day. Along with Reeves, Shorten and her band, Stone spent "an intense week of creation" at Mama Stone's. "We wrote the song and then we rehearsed it for, like, a little minute, and then we recorded it and then we wrote another one and recorded it. We didn't sit down and say, 'OK, how would we want this album to represent Joss? What songs are we going to choose? and blah, blah, blah ...' It wasn't any of that", Stone explained. She also enlisted guest musicians such as rapper Nas, guitarist Jeff Beck, percussionist Sheila E. and saxophonist David Sanborn.

== Release and promotion ==
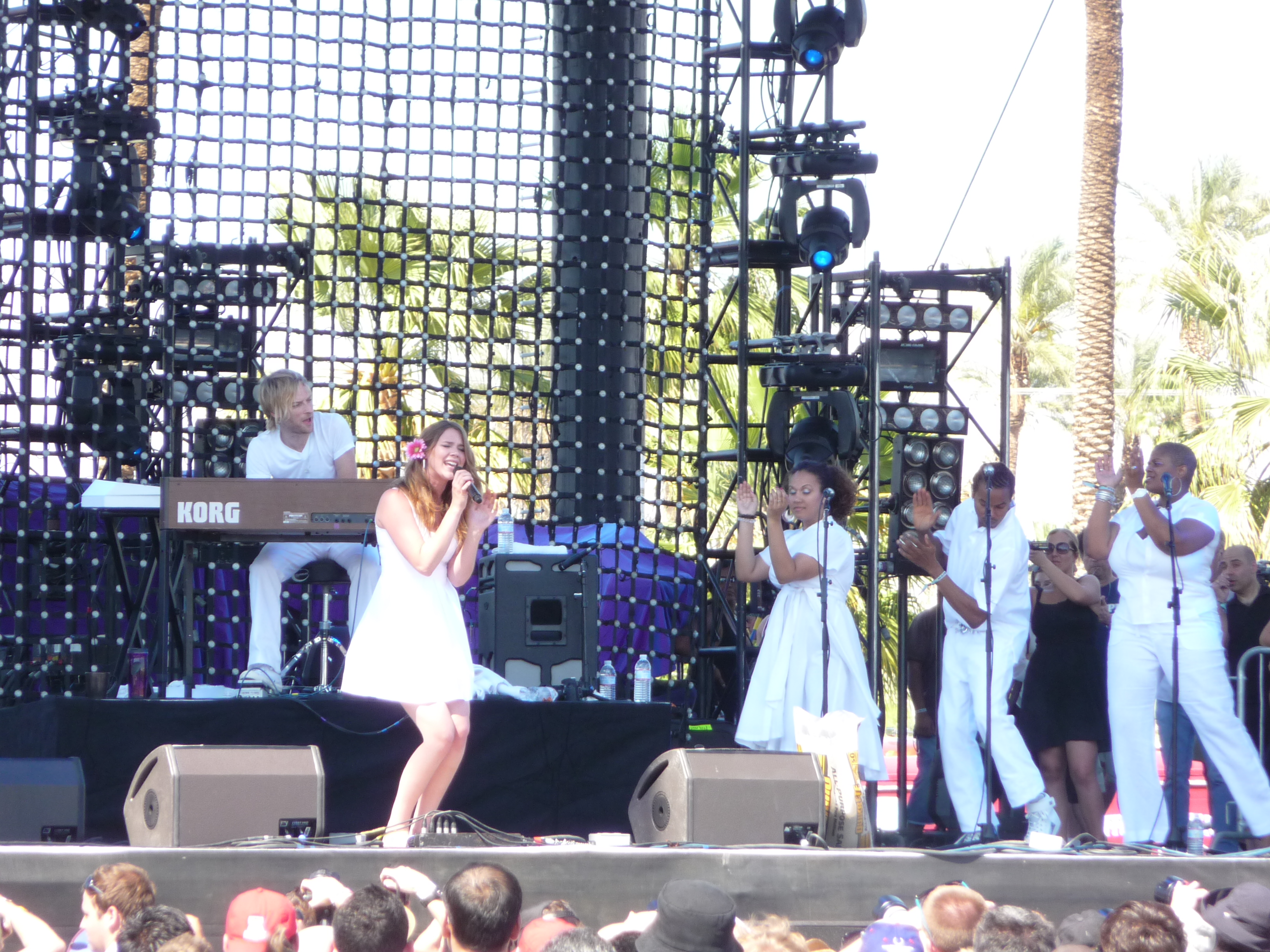
Stone performing at Coachella on 18 April 2009

Stone performed the song "Governmentalist" during voter registration group HeadCount's "Get Out the Vote Party" at the Highline Ballroom in New York City on 3 November 2008. The track was released as a free download on Stone's and HeadCount's respective websites. On 19 February 2009, Stone kicked off a promotional tour across the United Kingdom at Mama Stone's. The tour included concerts in Darlington, Bristol, Birmingham, Leeds, Glasgow, Liverpool, Manchester and Dover, and concluded on 4 March.

In the United States, Stone supported the album with performances at the 2009 Coachella Valley Music and Arts Festival on 18 April 2009, at Club Nokia in Los Angeles on 23 April and at the Beach Rescue Concert in Asbury Park, New Jersey, on 29 August. She later announced European tour dates, visiting countries such as Germany, the Netherlands, Austria, Sweden, Poland, Portugal and Greece between June and September 2009. From 21 to 23 November 2009, she performed three shows in the Brazilian cities of Rio de Janeiro, São Paulo and Porto Alegre, respectively. Stone then returned to Europe in February and March 2010 for an additional run of tour dates.

"Free Me" was released on 22 September 2009 as the only single from Colour Me Free!. Stone performed "Free Me" and a cover of Dusty Springfield's "Son of a Preacher Man" on Dancing with the Stars on 29 September 2009. She also performed "Free Me" on Jimmy Kimmel Live! on 1 October 2009 and on Live! with Regis and Kelly on 9 October. Stone appeared live on Later... with Jools Holland on 10 November 2009, performing "Free Me" and "Incredible". On 13 November, she performed "Free Me", "I Believe It to My Soul" and "Parallel Lines" on the hour-long, pre-recorded edition of Later... with Jools Holland.

On 16 November 2009, Stone appeared on the German late-night talk show TV total, where she performed "Free Me", as well as a duet with Swiss singer Stefanie Heinzmann on the latter's single "Unbreakable". She later performed "Big Ol' Game" with Raphael Saadiq on The Tonight Show with Conan O'Brien on 20 January 2010. Stone performed "Stalemate" with Jamie Hartman of Ben's Brother on The Wendy Williams Show on 24 March 2010, on The Early Show on 25 March, on The Tonight Show with Jay Leno on 29 March and on The Late Late Show with Craig Ferguson on 2 April.

=== Conflict with EMI ===
In May 2009, it was reported that Stone was willing to forfeit £2 million to terminate her four-album deal with EMI due to her dissatisfaction with the label after it was taken over by private equity firm Terra Firma in 2007. EMI refused to release her from her contract and took legal action in return, claiming she was in breach of contract by failing to deliver the master tapes for the album. Colour Me Free! was delayed once again until 20 October 2009. By January 2010, Stone's dispute with EMI had been settled.

The original cover art for Colour Me Free! features a black-and-white shot of Stone in a cage. An alternative cover, containing Stone's name and the album title against a purple background, was used for the North American release of the album. A representative for Stone said EMI insisted on switching the album art, while an EMI spokesperson claimed that Stone agreed to the purple text-only cover.

== Critical reception ==
Professional ratings
Aggregate scores
Source	Rating
Metacritic	67/100
Review scores
Source	Rating
AllMusic	3/5 stars
Chicago Sun-Times	2/4 stars
Entertainment Weekly	B
Los Angeles Times	2.5/4 stars
Metro News Canada	4.5/5 stars
New York Daily News	3/5 stars
New York Post	3.5/4 stars
PopMatters	6/10
USA Today	3.5/4 stars
Yahoo! Music UK	8/10 stars

Colour Me Free! received generally positive reviews from music critics. At Metacritic, which assigns a normalised rating out of 100 to reviews from mainstream publications, the album received an average score of 67, based on seven reviews. Angus Batey of Yahoo! Music UK wrote that Stone "delivers a string of superlative performances full of technique, character and [...] heart-pounding, raw, emotive soul", concluding that despite its "moments of bonkers excess", the album "proves, again, Joss Stone's considerable worth." Graham Rockingham of Metro News Canada raved that the album has "a sonic depth that you can reach in and caress, which is something you can usually only find on old Stax or Muscle Shoals LPs. Yet Stone manages to merge her '60s leanings with more contemporary sounds". Dan Aquilante of the New York Post opined that on Colour Me Free!, Stone is "at her bluesy, soul-singer best", stating that her voice is "powerful" and "reminiscent of the energy Aretha [Franklin] brought to many of her early recordings". Steve Jones of USA Today commented that Stone "sings with more grit and gusto than a battalion of R&B princesses while taking a sledgehammer to pop conventions" and concluded that "[s]he's assertive, sassy and lets lovers know that they play with her heart at their own risk."

The Observer's Hugh Montgomery called the album a "decent comeback" that "eschews [Stone's] last LP's hip-hop leanings for more straightforward retro soul funk", adding that "what most impresses is her voice, which has acquired emotional resonance to match its size." Jim Farber of the New York Daily News found that "the material on Free far outperforms that on earlier CDs" and noted that the album showcases "a far more stripped-down sound than before, which leaves more room for Stone's newly grounded vocals to shine." At Entertainment Weekly, Chris Willman viewed the first half of the album as "the best set of music [Stone has] done", while remarking that the second half "succumbs to R&B overproducers". Despite comparing Colour Me Free!'s theme of "breaking free" to that of Introducing Joss Stone (2007), Stephen Thomas Erlewine of AllMusic stated that Stone's "raw vocal skills remain impressive, as does her taste in soul, and even if this feels off-kilter, not quite achieving a balance between retro and modernity, it does beat with a messy human heart, one that was subdued on Introducing". Colin McGuire of PopMatters praised opening track "Free Me" as "easily one of the best songs [Stone has] ever written", but expressed that "setting the bar that high that early on [...] create[s] a level of expectation that the rest of the album's tracks simply don't live up to." Mikael Wood of the Los Angeles Times opined that "Colour Me Free succeeds about as well as Stone's other records: It's quite good in the up-tempo bits [...] and a little soggy in the ballads." Jim DeRogatis of the Chicago Sun-Times felt that "the problem is that Stone doesn't really have a master plan, or the discerning ear to tell her best moments [...] from her worst".

== Commercial performance ==
Colour Me Free! debuted at number 75 on the UK Albums Chart with first-week sales of 2,960 copies, becoming Stone's lowest-peaking album in the United Kingdom to date. As of July 2011, it had sold 14,071 copies in the UK. The album debuted at number 10 on the Billboard 200 with 27,000 copies sold in its first week, becoming Stone's second top 10 album in nation. The album had sold 93,000 copies in the US by July 2011. Elsewhere, Colour Me Free! performed moderately on the charts, reaching number five in Switzerland, number 16 in the Netherlands, number 17 in Austria, number 25 in Portugal, and number 26 in Canada and Germany.

== Track listing ==
No.	Title	Writer(s)	Producer(s)	Length
1.	"Free Me"	Joss Stone; Jonathan Shorten; Conner Reeves; Leo Nocentelli; Eric Baker	Stone; Shorten; Reeves	3:53
2.	"Could Have Been You"	Stone; Shorten; Reeves	Stone; Shorten; Reeves	4:52
3.	"Parallel Lines" (featuring Jeff Beck and Sheila E.)	Stone; Shorten; Reeves	Stone; Shorten; Reeves	4:26
4.	"Lady"	Stone; Shorten; Reeves	Stone; Shorten; Reeves	4:22
5.	"4 and 20"	Stone; Shorten; Reeves	Stone; Shorten; Reeves	5:06
6.	"Big Ol' Game" (featuring Raphael Saadiq)	Stone; Saadiq	Stone; Saadiq	4:30
7.	"Governmentalist" (featuring Nas)	Stone; Shorten; Reeves; Neville Malcolm; Hayley Carline; Nas	Stone; Shorten; Reeves	5:42
8.	"Incredible"	Stone; Shorten; Colin Hickson; Paddy Milner; Pete Cherry; Nikolaij Joel; Michael Bowes; Richie Stevens	Shorten	2:46
9.	"You Got the Love"	Arnecia Michelle Harris; Anthony B. Stephens		3:35
10.	"I Believe It to My Soul" (featuring David Sanborn)	Ray Charles	Phil Ramone	4:29
11.	"Stalemate" (with Jamie Hartman)	Hartman; Camilla Boler; Stone	Sacha Skarbek; Hartman	4:18
12.	"Girlfriend on Demand"	Stone; Dan Mackenzie	Mackenzie	4:30
13.	"Mr Wankerman" (hidden track; not on some US and Canadian pressings)	Stone; Javier Colon; Antonia Jenaé	Stone	13:44

iTunes Store bonus tracks
No.	Title	Writer(s)	Producer(s)	Length
13.	"Every Time I Turn Around"	Stone; Alonzo "Novel" Stevenson; Tony Reyes		4:24
14.	"Mr Wankerman"	Stone; Colon; Jenaé	Stone	13:44

Japanese edition bonus track
No.	Title	Writer(s)	Producer(s)	Length
13.	"I Get High"	Stone; Mackenzie	Mackenzie	3:14

=== Sample credits ===
- "Free Me" embodies portions of "Do the Dirt" by the Meters.

== Personnel ==
Credits adapted from the liner notes of Colour Me Free!

=== Musicians ===
- Joss Stone – vocals (all tracks); background vocals (tracks 3–5)
- Pete Iannacone – bass (tracks 1–4, 9)
- Lemar Carter – drums (tracks 1–5, 9)
- Stanton Moore – drums (track 1)
- Bobby Ozuna – percussion (tracks 1, 4); additional percussion (track 3)
- Kenya Baker – guitar (tracks 1–5, 9); additional guitar (track 6)
- Hollie Farris – trumpet (tracks 1–5, 9)
- Jeff Watkins – saxophone (tracks 1–4, 9)
- Winston Rollins – trombone (tracks 1–4)
- Charlie Happiness – sitar, bass harmonica (track 1)
- Raphael Saadiq – bass (track 2); featured artist, background vocals, bass, drums, guitar, percussion (track 6)
- Christian Lohr – Hammond (tracks 2–4, 9); keyboards (tracks 2, 3); piano (tracks 4, 5)
- Jonathan Shorten – piano (track 2); clavinet (track 3); Wurlitzer (track 4); Hammond (tracks 5, 7)
- Paul Riser – string arrangements (tracks 2, 5, 12); The Paul Riser Orchestra conductor (track 12)
- Jeff Beck – featured artist (track 3)
- Sheila E. – featured artist (track 3)
- Charles Jones – background vocals (tracks 3, 8)
- Ellison Kendrick – background vocals (tracks 3, 6, 8, 9)
- Conner Reeves – background vocals (tracks 4, 5)
- Steven Grier – beatbox (track 4)
- Paula Mitchell – background vocals (track 5)
- Neville Malcolm – upright bass (track 5); background vocals, guitar (track 7)
- Antonia Jenae – background vocals (track 6)
- Artia Lockett – background vocals (tracks 6, 9)
- Nas – featured artist (track 7)
- Richie Stevens – background vocals (track 7); drums (tracks 7, 8)
- Marc "Makani" Cyril – background vocals, bass (track 7)
- Darren Abraham – background vocals, percussion (track 7)
- Rob Bacon – guitar solo (track 7)
- Pete Cherry – bass (track 8)
- Michael Bowes – percussion (track 8)
- Nikolaij Joel – guitar (track 8)
- Paddy Miller – keyboards (track 8)
- Tony Kofi – saxophone (track 8)
- Mellissa LaRochelle – background vocals (track 9)
- Latonya Shorter – background vocals (track 9)
- Abel Pabon – piano (track 9)
- David Sanborn – alto saxophone (track 10)
- Christian McBride – bass (track 10)
- Steve Gadd – drums (track 10)
- Russell Malone – guitar (track 10)
- Gil Goldstein – Rhodes (track 10)
- Ricky Pederson – Hammond (track 10)
- Keyon Harold – trumpet (track 10)
- Lew Soloff – trumpet (track 10)
- Mike Davis – tenor trombone (track 10)
- Lou Marini – tenor saxophone (track 10)
- Howard Johnson – baritone saxophone (track 10)
- Charles Pillow – bass clarinet (track 10)
- Jamie Hartman – vocals, 12-string guitar, synth strings, Rhodes (track 11)
- Malcolm Moore – bass (track 11)
- Karl Brazil – drums, percussion (track 11)
- Luke Potashnik – guitar (track 11)
- Kris Houston – piano (track 11)
- Sacha Skarbek – Rhodes (track 11)
- Morgan Visconti – string arrangements (track 11)
- James Poyser – piano (track 12)
- Anatoly Rosinsky – violin (track 12)
- Elizabeth Wilson – violin (track 12)
- Liane Mautner – violin (track 12)
- Robert Brosseau – violin (track 12)
- Amy Hershberger – violin (track 12)
- Armen Garabedian – violin (track 12)
- Sally Berman – violin (track 12)
- Joe Ketendjian – violin (track 12)
- Agnes Gottschewski – violin (track 12)
- Robert Berg – viola (track 12)
- Lynn Grants – viola (track 12)
- Karolina Naziemiec – viola (track 12)
- Sam Formicola – viola (track 12)
- Maurice Grants – cello (track 12)
- Miguel Martinez – cello (track 12)
- Vahe Hayrikian – cello (track 12)
- Mike Velerio – contrabass (track 12)
- Drew Dembowski – contrabass (track 12)
- Paul Baker – harp (track 12)
- Stephanie O'Keefe – horn (track 12)
- Dan Kelley – horn (track 12)
- Phil Yao – horn (track 12)
- John Yoakum – oboe, English horn (track 12)
- Patricia Cloud – flute, alto flute (track 12)
- Paul Sternhagen – percussion (track 12)

=== Technical ===
- Joss Stone – production (tracks 1–6); album coordination, executive production
- Jonathan Shorten – production (tracks 1–5); recording, engineering (track 7)
- Conner Reeves – production (tracks 1–5)
- Jonathan Joseph – recording (tracks 1–5, 12); engineering (tracks 2, 4)
- James Tanksley – additional recording (tracks 1–4)
- Chuck Brungardt – mixing (tracks 1, 3–9, 12); engineering assistance (track 5); recording, engineering (track 9)
- Marlon Marcel – engineering assistance (tracks 1–5)
- Paul Suarez – engineering assistance (tracks 1–5, 7–9, 12)
- Kenya Baker – recording, engineering (track 2)
- Gerry Brown – string recording (tracks 2, 5, 12)
- Sir Mychael Davison – additional recording, engineering assistance (track 3)
- Alan Branch – additional recording, engineering assistance (track 3)
- Raphael Saadiq – production (track 6)
- Bojan Dugic – recording (track 6)
- Jerry Smith – recording, engineering (track 8)
- Phil Ramone – production (track 10)
- Joe Ferla – recording, mixing (track 10)
- Sacha Skarbek – production (track 11)
- Jamie Hartman – production (track 11)
- Dyre Gormsen – recording (track 11)
- Pete Ibsen – recording (track 11)
- Iain Hill – engineering assistance (track 11)
- Ainsley Adams – engineering assistance (track 11)
- Jeremy Wheatley – mixing (track 11)
- Dan Mackenzie – production (track 12)
- Ryan Moys – additional recording, engineering assistance (track 12)
- Tom Coyne – mastering at Sterling Sound (New York City)
- Courtney Christian – album coordination
- Paul Conroy – album coordination
- Natasha Radford – album coordination

== Charts ==
Weekly chart performance for Colour Me Free!
Chart (2009–2010)	Peak position
Australian Digital Albums (ARIA)	36
Austrian Albums (Ö3 Austria)	17
Belgian Albums (Ultratop Flanders)	50
Belgian Albums (Ultratop Wallonia)	56
Canadian Albums (Nielsen SoundScan)	26
Croatian International Albums (HDU)	37
Dutch Albums (Album Top 100)	16
French Albums (SNEP)	63
German Albums (Offizielle Top 100)	26
Italian Albums (FIMI)	53
Japanese Albums (Oricon)	102
Portuguese Albums (AFP)	25
Swiss Albums (Schweizer Hitparade)	5
UK Albums (Official Charts)	75
UK R&B Albums (Official Charts)	10
US Billboard 200	10
US Top R&B/Hip-Hop Albums (Billboard)	9

== Release history ==
Release history for Colour Me Free!
Region	Date	Label	Ref.
Canada	20 October 2009	EMI	
United States	20 October 2009	Virgin	
Germany	30 October 2009	EMI	
Italy	30 October 2009	EMI	
France	2 November 2009	EMI	
United Kingdom	2 November 2009	Virgin	
Australia	6 November 2009	EMI	
Japan	18 November 2009	EMI	
