= Ray Ray =

Ray Ray or Ray-Ray may refer to:

- Ray Ray (album), a 2004 album by Raphael Saadiq
- Ray-Ray Armstrong (born 1991), American football player
- Ray-Ray McCloud (born 1996), American football player
- Ray Ray, a member of American boy band Mindless Behavior
- Ray Ray Lee, a character from American TV series The Life and Times of Juniper Lee

== See also ==
- Ray Ray From Summerhill, a 2018 album by YFN Lucci
