= Daniel McKenzie =

Daniel McKenzie may refer to:

- A. Daniel McKenzie (1924–1989), Manitoba, Canada politician
- Daniel McKenzie (footballer) (born 1996), Australian rules footballer
- Daniel McKenzie (racing driver) (born 1988), British racing driver
- Dan McKenzie (geophysicist) (born 1942), British geophysical academic who pioneered plate tectonics
- Daniel Duncan McKenzie (1859–1927), Nova Scotia, Canada politician
- Daniel George McKenzie (1860–1940), farmer and political figure in Nova Scotia, Canada
- Dan Mackenzie, American songwriter-producer
- Dan MacKenzie, Canadian sports and business executive
