= L-O-V-E =

1964 single by Nat King Cole

Single by Nat King Cole

from the album L-O-V-E
- B-side: "I Don't Want to See Tomorrow"
- Released: September 1964
- Recorded: June 3, 1964
- Genre: Jazz; swing; soul
- Length: 2:30
- Label: Capitol
- Songwriters: Bert Kaempfert; Milt Gabler
- Producer: Lee Gillette

Official audio
- "L-O-V-E" on YouTube

"L-O-V-E" is a song written by Bert Kaempfert and Milt Gabler, recorded by Nat King Cole for his 1965 studio album L-O-V-E.

== Composition and background ==
The song was composed by Bert Kaempfert with lyrics by Milt Gabler, and produced by Lee Gillette. The trumpet solo was performed by Bobby Bryant. The song had previously appeared as an instrumental track on Kaempfert's album Blue Midnight (1964).

For international versions of his L-O-V-E album, Nat King Cole also recorded versions of "L-O-V-E" and other songs, in Japanese (mixed with English words), Italian, German, Spanish and French. In this last language, the song was renamed "Je Ne Repartirai Pas" and translated by Jean Delleme.

== Joss Stone version ==
"L-O-V-E"

Single by Joss Stone
- Released: September 18, 2007
- Recorded: 2007
- Genre: Jazz
- Length: 2:48
- Label: Virgin
- Songwriters: Bert Kaempfert; Milt Gabler
- Producer: Raphael Saadiq

Joss Stone singles chronology
| "Tell Me What We're Gonna Do Now" (2007) | "L-O-V-E" (2007) | "Baby Baby Baby" (2007) |

English singer Joss Stone recorded a cover of "L-O-V-E" for the soundtrack to a commercial for Chanel's Coco Mademoiselle fragrance. The ad, starring Keira Knightley and directed by Joe Wright, debuted on September 24, 2007, on E!, Bravo, and VH1.

Stone's version was released digitally on September 18, 2007, reaching number 100 on the UK singles chart and number 75 on the Swiss Hitparade. It was later included as a bonus track on the deluxe version of her third studio album, Introducing Joss Stone (2007), as well as on her compilation album The Best of Joss Stone 2003–2009 (2011).

Stone performed a duet of the song with Natalie Cole at Frosted Pink, a benefit concert to raise awareness of women's cancer, which took place at the Barker Hangar in Santa Monica, California, on October 6, 2007, and aired on ABC on October 14.

== Yōko Oginome version ==
"Love"

Single by Yōko Oginome
- Language: Japanese
- B-side: "Candy"
- Released: October 24, 2001
- Recorded: 2001
- Genre: J-pop
- Length: 5:04
- Label: Victor
- Songwriters: Kenji Sazanami; Bert Kaempfert; Milt Gabler

Yōko Oginome singles chronology
| "Feeling" (1999) | "Love" (2001) | "Dancing Hero: The Archives" (2015) |

"L-O-V-E" was covered in Japanese by Yōko Oginome as her 41st single, released on October 24, 2011, by Victor Entertainment. Based on the 1965 version recorded by Hibari Misora, the song was used by TBS as the theme song of the drama series Love & Fight. The B-side is a cover of the 1944 song "Candy".

=== Track listing ===
CD single
| No. | Title | Lyrics | Music | Arrangement | Length |
|---|---|---|---|---|---|
| 1. | "Love" | Kenji Sazanami; Milt Gabler | Bert Kaempfert | Takehiro Kawabe |
| 2. | "Love" (Sweet Swing Track) | Sazanami; Gabler | Kaempfert | Seikō Nagaoka |
| 3. | "Candy" | Mack David; Joan Whitney | Alex Kramer | H-Wonder |

== Charts ==
=== Nat King Cole version ===
| Chart (1964) | Peak position |
|---|---|
| US Billboard Hot 100 | 81 |
| US Adult Contemporary (Billboard) | 17 |

| Chart (2014) | Peak position |
|---|---|
| France (SNEP) | 111 |

=== Joss Stone version ===
| Chart (2007) | Peak position |
|---|---|
| France Digital Song Sales (Billboard) | 8 |
| Switzerland (Schweizer Hitparade) | 75 |
| UK Singles (Official Charts) | 100 |

== Certifications ==
| Region | Certification | Certified units/sales |
|---|---|---|
| United Kingdom (BPI) | Gold | 400,000^{‡} |
^{‡} Sales+streaming figures based on certification alone.
