= Free Me (Joss Stone song) =

Single by Joss Stone

from the album Colour Me Free!
- Released: 8 November 2009
- Length: 3:53
- Label: Virgin; EMI
- Songwriter(s): Joss Stone; Jonathan Shorten; Leo Nocentelli; Eric Baker; Conner Reeves
- Producer(s): Joss Stone; Jonathan Shorten; Conner Reeves

Joss Stone singles chronology
"Baby Baby Baby" (2007)	"Free Me" (2009)	"The Best Thing About Me Is You" (2011)

"Free Me" is a song by English singer-songwriter Joss Stone. It was written by Stone, Jonathan Shorten, Eric Baker, and Conner Reeves for her fourth studio album, Colour Me Free! (2009). The song embodies portions of "Do the Dirt" by The Meters. Due to the inclusion of the sample, Leo Nocentelli is also credited as a songwriter. "Free Me" was released as the album's first and only single on 8 November 2009.

== Background ==
Stone wrote the song as a protest song against her label, EMI. In the song, Stone sings that she cannot be told what to do. In the outro, she even sings "Free me, free me, EMI". It was reported that Stone wanted to leave EMI, but EMI didn't want to end the four-album contract Stone signed in 2006. Before Colour Me Free, she had only released one out of the four albums that were in her contract. EMI/Virgin retained the rights to her previously released songs and released the compilation album The Best of Joss Stone 2003–2009 which included the song "Free Me". In 2010, the song was featured in the trailer for the film, Morning Glory.

== Track listing ==
CD single
No.	Title	Writer(s)	Producer(s)	Length
1.	"Free Me"	Joss Stone; Jonathan Shorten; Conner Reeves; Leo Nocentelli; Eric Baker	Stone; Shorten; Reeves	3:53
2.	"I Get High"	Stone; Dan Mackenzie	Mackenzie	3:14

Sample credits

- "Free Me" embodies portions of "Do the Dirt" by The Meters.

== Charts ==
Weekly chart performance for "Free Me"
Chart (2009)	Peak position
Switzerland (Schweizer Hitparade)	50
