= Baby Baby Baby (Joss Stone song) =

Single by Joss Stone

from the album Introducing Joss Stone
- B-side: "L-O-V-E" (Long Version)
- Released: 23 December 2007
- Recorded: Compass Point Studios (Nassau, Bahamas)
- Genre: Neo soul
- Length: 4:34
- Label: Relentless
- Songwriter(s): Joss Stone; Danny P; Jonathan Shorten
- Producer(s): Raphael Saadiq

Joss Stone singles chronology
"L-O-V-E" (2007)	"Baby Baby Baby" (2007)	"Free Me" (2009)

"Baby Baby Baby" is a song by English singer and songwriter Joss Stone from her third studio album, Introducing Joss Stone (2007). It was written by Stone, Danny P and Jonathan Shorten, while production was handled by Raphael Saadiq. The song was released on 23 December 2007 as the album's third and final single. On 29 September 2009, a self-produced music video was leaked onto YouTube.

Stone performed the song at the Swarovski Fashion Rocks at the Royal Albert Hall in London on 18 October 2007, in aid of The Prince's Trust, as well as at the Austin City Limits Music Festival at Zilker Park in Austin, Texas, on 14 September 2007.

== Background ==
During an interview with Harp, Stone said of the song:

It's like a feel-good, 'up' kind of song. Kinda Jackson 5-ish, but I made it my own. It's classy, and musicians will appreciate it. Raphael played the bass and he fucking killed it—he's my favorite bass player right now. And we used all live drums; we put in scratches and stuff, but the drums were played.

== Critical reception ==
IndieLondon.co.uk gave the song a four-star rating, calling it a "welcome return for Joss Stone to the type of retro-heavy territory that first made her standout on the Soul Sessions LP." Digital Spy's Nick Levine rated the song three stars, deeming it "a lithe, sparky old-school soul workout on which Stone proclaims her love for the man her 'heart demaaands'", adding that "[h]er terrific voice never has anything very interesting to say."

== Music video ==
On 29 September 2009, the music video was leaked onto YouTube. It was produced by Stone herself without help from EMI. The video was described as "the worst video of all time" by Marie Claire in 2010.

== Commercial performance ==
The song become Stone's first single not to enter the UK Singles Chart, but it did peak at No. 8 on the UK R&B Chart.

== Track listings ==
- UK digital download 1
1. "Baby Baby Baby" (UK Radio Mix) – 3:26
2. "Baby Baby Baby" (Relentless Club Mix) – 3:45
- UK CD single and digital download 2
1. "Baby Baby Baby" (UK Radio Mix) – 3:23
2. "L-O-V-E" (Long Version) – 2:48

== Credits and personnel ==
Credits adapted from the liner notes of Introducing Joss Stone.

- Joss Stone – lead vocals, songwriting
- Jawara Adams – trumpet
- Chalmers "Spanky" Alford – guitar
- Mike Boden – assistant engineering
- Oswald Bowe – assistant engineering
- Chuck Brungardt – mixing, recording
- Priscilla Jones Campbell – backing vocals
- Tom Coyne – mastering
- Reggie Dozier – string recording
- Steve Greenwell – vocal recording
- Lionel Holoman – Wurlitzer
- Justin Kessler – Pro Tools operator
- Mix Master Mike – turntablism
- Robert Ozuna – percurssion
- Danny P – songwriting
- Khari Parker – drums
- Tino Richardson – saxophone
- Raphael Saadiq – backing vocals, bass, guitar, horn arrangements, production
- Ian Shea – assistant engineering
- Jonathan Shorten – songwriting
- Luke Smith – assistant engineering
- Scott Somerville – assistant engineering
- Glenn Standridge – mixing, recording
- Charlie Stavish – assistant engineering
- Benjamin Wright – string arrangements

== Charts ==
Chart (2008)	Peak position
Scotland (OCC)	53
UK Hip Hop/R&B (OCC)	8

== Release history ==
Region	Date	Format	Label	Ref.
United Kingdom	23 December 2007	Digital download	Relentless	
United Kingdom	14 January 2008	CD single; digital download	Relentless	
