= Total World Tour =

2014–19 concert tour by Joss Stone

- World tour by Joss Stone
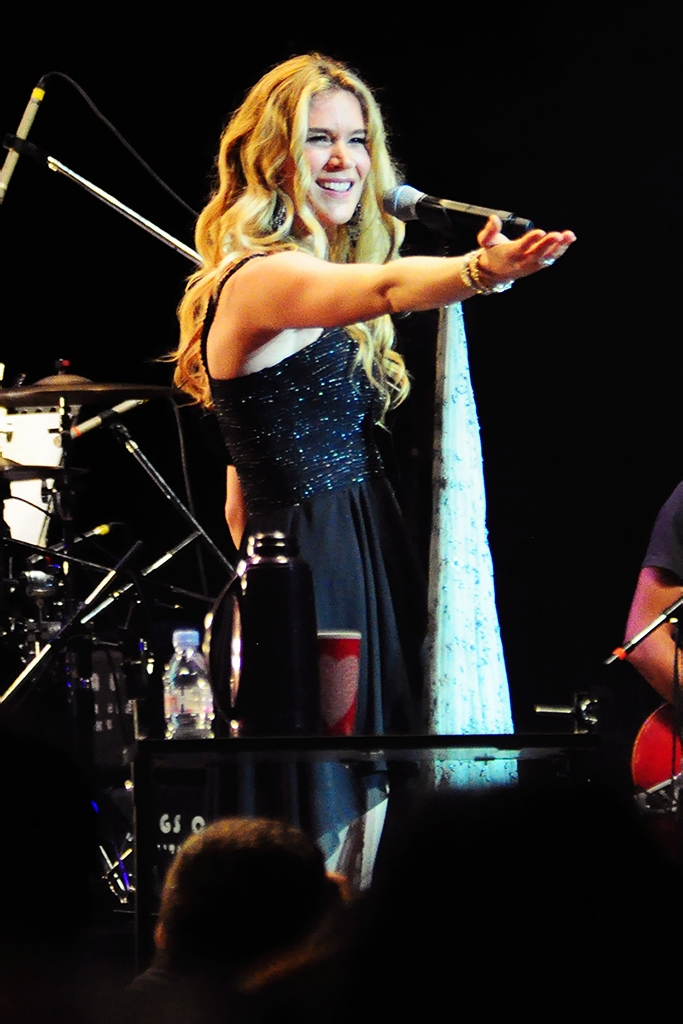
- Stone performing on the first Buenos Aires date of the tour.
- Start date: 29 March 2014
- End date: 3 July 2019
- No. of shows: 247

Joss Stone concert chronology
- LP1 World Tour (2011); Total World Tour (2014–2019); 20 Years of Soul (2023)

The Total World Tour was the fifth concert tour by English recording artist Joss Stone. The tour lasted 6 years, with Stone expressing her intent to play in every country on Earth, and mostly succeeded in her goal, even reaching countries such as North Korea, Yemen, and Iraq. For this achievement, she was the first artist to receive the World Tour Certification, also recognized by Guinness World Records. It began in Casablanca, Morocco on 29 March 2014, and ended prematurely in Barcelona, Spain on 3 July 2019. The tour would have ended on 4 July 2019 in Kish Island, Iran, but upon entry to the country, Stone was deported, as authorities believed her concert would be public.

Along with the concerts, on each day of the tour, Stone met and sang with local musicians and volunteered with local charities. To respect the culture, Stone wore a hijab when visiting various Middle Eastern countries, even when it wasn't legally required. In order to perform in Syria, Stone crossed into the country illegally. The tour featured various local and international support acts in each country. For example, American India Arie joined as a support act for the first Oceania leg.

== Deportation from Iran ==
Joss Stone was scheduled to conclude the Total World Tour on 4 July 2019 with a private concert in Iran. However, upon arrival to Kish International Airport, Stone was detained by authorities who believed her concert would be public. In Iran, it is illegal for women to perform public concerts because Shia Muslim clerics believe that "a woman's singing voice can be erotic". Stone was aware of this law, and was quoted saying "We were aware there couldn’t be a public concert as I am a woman and that is illegal in this country. Personally I don’t fancy going to an Iranian prison nor am I trying to change the politics of the countries I visit nor do I wish to put other people in danger." She later claimed that the people in immigration treated her "...the best [she had] experienced anywhere." and "...they were so upset that they had to deport [her]."

== Shows ==
List of shows, including the date, city, country and venue.
Date	City	Country	Venue	Ref.
Africa
29 March 2014 (Note: The show on 29 March 2014 was part of the Jazzablanca festival.)	Casablanca	Morocco	Hippodrome Casa-Anfa	
31 March 2014	Vacoas-Phoenix	Mauritius	J&J Auditorium	
2 April 2014	Brakpan	South Africa	Big Top Arena	
5 April 2014	Maseru	Lesotho	Unknown	
9 April 2014	Manzini	Eswatini	House on Fire	
13 April 2014 (Note: The show on 13 April in Tunis, was part of Jazz à Carthage.)	Tunis	Tunisia	Carthage Thalasso Resort	
Oceania
18 April 2014 (Note: The shows on 18 & 21 April are part of Byron Bay Bluesfest 2014.)	Tyagarah	Australia	Tyagarah Tea Tree Farm	
20 April 2014	Brisbane	Australia	The Tivoli	
21 April 2014 (Note: The shows on 18 & 21 April are part of Byron Bay Bluesfest 2014.)	Tyagarah	Australia	Tyagarah Tea Tree Farm	
24 April 2014	Sydney	Australia	Enmore Theatre	
25 April 2014	Auckland	New Zealand	Vector Arena	
27 April 2014	Wellington	New Zealand	Michael Fowler Centre	
Asia
1 May 2014 (Note: The show on 1 May 2014 is part of the Blended Music Festival.)	Dubai	United Arab Emirates	Dubai Media City Amphitheatre	
South America
10 May 2014 (Note: The show on 10 May 2014 is part of the Best of Blues festival.)	São Paulo	Brazil	WTC Golden Hall	
Asia
2 July 2014 (Note: The show on 2 July 2014 was part of the Beiteddine Festival.)	Beit ed-Dine	Lebanon	Beiteddine Palace	
Europe
10 July 2014 (Note: The show on 10 July 2014 was part of the Henley Festival.)	Henley-on-Thames	England	River Thames	
12 July 2014 (Note: The show on 12 July 2014 is part of North Sea Jazz Festival 2014.)	Rotterdam	Netherlands	Ahoy Arena	
13 July 2014 (Note: The show on 14 July 2014 is part of the OMNI festival.)	Luxembourg City	Luxembourg	Neumünster Abbey	
16 July 2014 (Note: The show on 16 July 2014 is part of the Jazz à Juan festival.)	Juan-les-Pins	France	La Pinède Gould	
17 July 2014	Barcelona	Spain	Sala Bikini	
19 July 2014 (Note: The show on 19 July 2014 is part of MEO marés vivas festival.)	Vila Nova de Gaia	Portugal	Praia do Cabedelo do Douro	
23 July 2014	Prague	Czechia	Lucerna Music Bar	
25 July 2014 (Note: The show on 25 July 2014 is part of Blue Balls Festival.)	Lucerne	Switzerland	Lucerne Culture and Congress Centre	
27 July 2014	Bratislava	Slovakia	Refinery Gallery	
29 July 2014	Budapest	Hungary	Budapest Park	
30 July 2014 (Note: This concert ended prematurely after about an hour due to the rainy weather condition.)	Vienna	Austria	Arena	
1 August 2014	Pula	Croatia	Pula Amphitheatre	
2 August 2014 (Note: The show on 2 August 2014 was part of the one-off Universe of Joy festival.)	Ljubljana	Slovenia	Križanke	
23 August 2014 (Note: The show on 23 August 2014 was part of the Soul im Hafen festival.)	Hamburg	Germany	Banksstraße	
South America
27 August 2014	Bogotá	Colombia	Teatro Royal Center	
North America
29 August 2014 (Note: The show on 29 August 2014 was part of Curaçao North Sea Jazz Festival.)	Willemstad	Curaçao	Dolphin Academy Curaçao	
7 September 2014	Kansas City	United States	Crossroads KC	
10 September 2014 (Note: The show on 10 September 2014 was part of Ravinia Festival.)	Highland Park	United States	Ravinia Park	
11 September 2014	Detroit	United States	Sound Board	
14 September 2014 (Note: The show on 14 September 2014 was part of Ottawa Folk Festival.)	Ottawa	Canada	Hog's Back Park	
15 September 2014	Toronto	Canada	Massey Hall	
Europe
24 October 2014	Chișinău	Moldova	Filarmonica Națională „Serghei Lunchevici”	
South America
1 March 2015	Quito	Ecuador	Teatro Nacional Sucre	
3 March 2015	Lima	Peru	Huaca Pucllana	
6 March 2015	Santiago	Chile	Teatro Caupolicán	
8 March 2015	Buenos Aires	Argentina	Estadio Luna Park	
11 March 2015	São Paulo	Brazil	Citibank Hall	
13 March 2015	Brasília	Brazil	NET Live Brasília	
15 March 2015	Olinda	Brazil	Chevrolet Hall	
18 March 2015	Montevideo	Uruguay	Gran Teatro Metro	
21 March 2015	Asunción	Paraguay	Gran teatro del banco central	
24 March 2015	Santa Cruz de la Sierra	Bolivia	Hard Rock Café	
Asia
10 April 2015	Muharraq	Bahrain	Arad Fort	
North America
16 May 2015 (Note: The show on 16 May 2015 was part of Rock in Rio USA.)	Winchester	United States	MGM Resorts Festival Grounds	
18 May 2015	Mexico City	Mexico	El Plaza Condesa	
Europe
3 July 2015	Schaan	Liechtenstein	SAL	
North America
5 July 2015 (Note: The show on 5 July 2015 was part of Montreal International Jazz Festival.)	Montreal	Canada	Métropolis	
10 July 2015	Philadelphia	United States	World Cafe Live	
23 July 2015	Los Angeles	United States	The Fonda Theatre	
Europe
1 August 2015 (Note: The show on 1 August 2015 is part of CarFest North.)	Little Budworth	England	Oulton Park	
3 October 2015	Zürich	Switzerland	Kaufleuten	
4 October 2015	Murten	Switzerland	Hotel Murten	
Asia
10 October 2015 (Note: The show on 10 October 2015 was part of Monsoon Festival.)	Hanoi	Vietnam	Imperial Citadel of Thăng Long	
12 October 2015	Tokyo	Japan	Billboard Live	
13 October 2015	Tokyo	Japan	Billboard Live	
15 October 2015	Osaka	Japan	Billboard Live	
17 October 2015 (Note: The shows on 17 and 18 January 2015 were part of JZ Music Festival.)	Shanghai	China	Shanghai Expo Park	
18 October 2015 (Note: The shows on 17 and 18 January 2015 were part of JZ Music Festival.)	Shanghai	China	Shanghai Expo Park	
South America
14 November 2015	Punta del Este	Uruguay	Conrad Hotel & Casino	
Africa
20 November 2015 (Note: The show on 20 November 2015 was part of the Mascom Live Sessions concert series.)	Gaborone	Botswana	Botswanacraft	
21 November 2015	Lusaka	Zambia	The Web	
Asia
10 December 2015	Colombo	Sri Lanka	Barefoot Garden Café	
North America
15 January 2016	Tela	Honduras	Tela Railroad Company	
17 January 2016	San Salvador	El Salvador	Scenarium	
18 January 2016	Managua	Nicaragua	Rubén Darío National Theatre	
24 January 2016	San José	Costa Rica	Jazz Café	
27 January 2016	Panama City	Panama	Teatro Amador	
29 January 2016	Guatemala City	Guatemala	Teatro Lux	
Asia
14 February 2016 (Note: The show on 14 February 2016 was part of The Mahindra Blues Festival.)	Mumbai	India	Mehboob Studio	
18 February 2016	Kathmandu	Nepal	Hyatt Regency Kathmandu	
20 February 2016	Dhaka	Bangladesh	Pop Republic	
23 February 2016	Thimphu	Bhutan	YDF Hall	
28 February 2016	Kaafu Atoll	Maldives	Huvafen Fushi	
5 March 2016 (Note: The show on 5 March 2016 was part of the Singapore International Jazz Festival.)	Singapore		Marina Bay Sands	
North America
18 March 2016	Westbury	United States	The Space at Westbury Theater	
20 March 2016	Norfolk	United States	Infinity Music Hall & Bistro	
9 April 2016 (Note: The show on 9 April 2016 was part of Pure Grenada Music Festival.)	St. George's	Grenada	Camper & Nicholsons Port Louis Marina	
12 April 2016	Palm Island	Saint Vincent and the Grenadines	Palm Island Resort	
South America
21 April 2016	Caracas	Venezuela	La Quinta Bar	
North America
23 April 2016	Punta Cana	Dominican Republic	Hard Rock Café	
3 May 2016 (Note: The show on 3 May 2016 was part of Tuesday on the Rocks' "The Listening Sessions" event. It was originally scheduled for 19 April 2016, but was postponed so Stone could be with her sick dog.)	Port of Spain	Trinidad and Tobago	RuStreet	
Europe
15 May 2016	London	England	Roundhouse	
23 June 2016 (Note: The show on 23 June 2016 was part of the Blues 'N' Jazz festival.)	Rapperswil-Jona	Switzerland	Blues 'N' Jazz Festival Grounds	
25 June 2016	Tivat	Montenegro	Almara Beach Club	
4 July 2016	London	England	Royal Festival Hall	
9 July 2016 (Note: The show on 9 July 2016 was part of Afro-Latino Festival.)	Bree	Belgium	Festivalpark Berkenbroek	
12 July 2016	Vilnius	Lithuania	Palace of the Grand Dukes of Lithuania	
15 July 2016 (Note: The show on 15 July 2016 was part of the Pori Jazz festival.)	Pori	Finland	Kirjurinluoto	
16 July 2016 (Note: The show on 16 July 2016 was part of Positivus Festival.)	Salacgrīva	Latvia	Salacgrīva Fisherman's Park	
18 July 2016	Copenhagen	Denmark	Amager Bio	
21 July 2016 (Note: The show on 21 July 2016 was part of Molde International Jazz Festival.)	Molde	Norway	Romsdalsmuseet	
23 July 2016 (Note: The show on 23 July 2016 was part of the Istanbul Jazz Festival.)	Istanbul	Turkey	KüçükÇiftlik Park	
Asia
25 July 2016	Tel Aviv	Israel	Barby	
Europe
29 July 2016 (Note: The show on 29 July 2016 was part of Sani Festival.)	Kassandreia	Greece	Sani Resort	
30 July 2016 (Note: The show on 30 July 2016 was part of Fengaros Festival.)	Kato Drys	Cyprus	Fengaros Festival	
12 August 2016 (Note: The show on 12 August 2016 was part of the Heitere Open Air festival.)	Zofingen	Switzerland	Heiternplatz	
13 August 2016 (Note: The show on 13 August 2016 was part of International Jazz Festival Bansko.)	Bansko	Bulgaria	Nikola Vaptsarov Square	
14 August 2016 (Note: The show on 14 August 2016 was part of the Nišville festival.)	Niš	Serbia	Niš Fortress	
6 September 2016	Minsk	Belarus	Palace of the Republic	
8 September 2016 (Note: The show on 8 September 2016 was part of PLAI Festival.)	Timișoara	Romania	Banat Village Museum	
11 September 2016 (Note: The show on 11 September 2016 was part of the Ethno Jazz Festival.)	Wrocław	Poland	The Business Club Room at Stadion Wrocław	
15 September 2016	Sarajevo	Bosnia and Herzegovina	Sarajevo National Theatre	
17 September 2016	Pristina	Kosovo	ZONE Club	
11 October 2016	Tallinn	Estonia	Nordea Concert Hall	
14 October 2016 (Note: The show on 14 October 2016 was part of the Skopje Jazz Festival.)	Skopje	North Macedonia	Macedonian Opera and Ballet	
16 October 2016	Yerevan	Armenia	Karen Demirchyan Complex	
19 October 2016	Kyiv	Ukraine	The Freedom Hall	
20 October 2016	Kyiv	Ukraine	The Freedom Hall	
30 October 2016	Reykjavík	Iceland	Harpa	
Africa
26 November 2016	Nairobi	Kenya	The Purdy Arms	
27 November 2016	Zanzibar City	Tanzania	Red Monkey Lodge	
1 December 2016	Lilongwe	Malawi	Bingu wa Mutharika International Convention Centre	
3 December 2016	Maputo	Mozambique	Cinema Scala	
5 December 2016	Khartoum	Sudan	Khartoum International Community School	
17 January 2017	Djibouti City	Djibouti	Unknown	
21 January 2017	Malabo	Equatorial Guinea	Sofitel malabo sipopo le golf	
23 January 2017	Douala	Cameroon	French Institute of Cameroon	
26 January 2017	Libreville	Gabon	No Stress Bar	
28 January 2017	São Tomé	São Tomé and Príncipe	Pestana São Tomé	
30 January 2017	Accra	Ghana	+233 Jazz Bar & Grill	
Asia
2 March 2017 (Note: The show on 2 March 2017 was part of Chubmet Friendship Festival.)	Siem Reap	Cambodia	Jaya House River Park	
4 March 2017	Yangon	Myanmar	Kandawgyi Palace Hotel	
6 March 2017	Vientiane	Laos	Embassy of the United Kingdom	
9 March 2017	Bangkok	Thailand	Cloud47	
12 March 2017	Dili	East Timor	Hotel Timor	
16 March 2017	Taipei	Taiwan	ATT Show Box	
18 March 2017	Petaling Jaya	Malaysia	The Roof at First Avenue Bandar Utama	
Europe
22 March 2017 (Note: The show on 22 March 2017 was part of Burghausen International Jazz Week.)	Burghausen	Germany	Wackerhalle	
Africa
28 April 2017 (Note: The show on 28 April 2017 was part of the Jazz à Ouaga festival.)	Ouagadougou	Burkina Faso	French Institute of Burkina Faso	
30 April 2017 (Note: The show on 30 April 2017 was part of Runway Jazz Festival.)	Lagos	Nigeria	Eko Hotels and Suites	
3 May 2017	Monrovia	Liberia	RLJ Kendeja Resort & Villas	
5 May 2017	Freetown	Sierra Leone	Radisson Blu Mammy Yoko Hotel	
8 May 2017	Cotonou	Benin	Africa Sound City	
9 May 2017	Lomé	Togo	French Institute of Togo	
1 June 2017 (Note: The Kigali show was originally scheduled for November of 2016, but was postponed to 1 June 2017.)	Kigali	Rwanda	Kigali Marriott Hotel	
2 June 2017	Harare	Zimbabwe	7 Arts Theatre	
5 June 2017	Brazzaville	Republic of the Congo	Hôtel de la préfecture de Brazzaville	
North America
22 June 2017	Detroit	United States	Chene Park	
23 June 2017 (Note: The show on 23 June 2017 was part of Rochester International Jazz Festival.)	Rochester	United States	Kodak Hall at Eastman Theatre	
25 June 2017 (Note: The show on 25 June 2017 was part of the Ottawa Jazz Festival.)	Ottawa	Canada	Confederation Park	
26 June 2017 (Note: The show on 26 June 2017 was part of the Montreal Jazz Festival.)	Toronto	Canada	Danforth Music Hall	
28 June 2017	Chicago	United States	Thalia Hall	
30 June 2017 (Note: The show on 30 June 2017 was part of Summerfest.)	Milwaukee	United States	Briggs & Stratton Big Backyard	
1 July 2017 (Note: The show on 1 July 2017 was part of the Saturday in the Park festival.)	Sioux City	United States	Grandview Park Music Pavilion	
3 July 2017 (Note: The show on 3 July 2017 was part of Waterfront Blues Festival.)	Portland	United States	Tom McCall Waterfront Park	
5 July 2017 (Note: The show on 5 July 2017 was part of the Montreal International Jazz Festival.)	Montreal	Canada	Salle Wilfrid‐Pelletier	
Europe
7 July 2017 (Note: The show on 7 July 2017 was part of North Sea Jazz Festival.)	Rotterdam	Netherlands	Ahoy Arena	
20 July 2017 (Note: The show on 20 July 2017 was part of Summer Nights Festival.)	Pratteln	Switzerland	Z7	
22 July 2017	Andorra la Vella	Andorra	Acta Arthotel	
24 July 2017 (Note: The show on 24 July 2017 was part of the Monte-Carlo Sporting Summer Festival.)	Monaco		Salle Garnier	
28 July 2017 (Note: The show on 28 July 2017 was part of No Borders Music Festival.)	Tarvisio	Italy	Piazza Unità	
30 July 2017 (Note: The show on 30 July 2017 was part of the Black Sea Jazz Festival.)	Batumi	Georgia	Batumi Tennis Club	
5 August 2017 (Note: The show on 5 August 2017 was part of Notodden Blues Festival.)	Notodden	Norway	Hovigs Hangar	
Africa
30 August 2017	Algiers	Algeria	Sofitel Algiers Hamma Garden	
2 September 2017	Bissau	Guinea-Bissau	Portuguese Cultural Centre	
5 September 2017	Banjul	The Gambia	Jaama Hall at the Kairaba Beach Hotel	
8 September 2017	Dakar	Senegal	Pullman Dakar Teranga	
9 September 2017	Nouakchott	Mauritania	Rotana Café	
13 September 2017	Bamako	Mali	French Institute of Mali	
Europe
8 October 2017	Dublin	Ireland	Vicar Street	
10 October 2017	Belfast	Northern Ireland	Ulster Hall	
13 October 2017	Glasgow	Scotland	Glasgow Royal Concert Hall	
15 October 2017	Cardiff	Wales	Neuadd Dewi Sant	
17 October 2017	London	England	Royal Festival Hall	
2 October 2017	Chișinău	Moldova	Filarmonica Națională „Serghei Lunchevici”	
26 October 2017	Tirana	Albania	Tulla Culture Center	
18 November 2017 (Note: The shows on 18, 22, 23, 24 and 25 November 2017 were part of Night of the Proms.)	Rotterdam	Netherlands	Ahoy Arena	
22 November 2017 (Note: The shows on 18, 22, 23, 24 and 25 November 2017 were part of Night of the Proms.)	Hasselt	Belgium	Ethias Arena	
23 November 2017 (Note: The shows on 18, 22, 23, 24 and 25 November 2017 were part of Night of the Proms.)	Antwerp	Belgium	Sportpaleis	
24 November 2017 (Note: The shows on 18, 22, 23, 24 and 25 November 2017 were part of Night of the Proms.)	Antwerp	Belgium	Sportpaleis	
25 November 2017 (Note: The shows on 18, 22, 23, 24 and 25 November 2017 were part of Night of the Proms.)	Antwerp	Belgium	Sportpaleis	
Africa
28 November 2017	Luanda	Angola	Clube Naval	
30 November 2017	Windhoek	Namibia	Warehouse Theatre	
2 December 2017	Addis Ababa	Ethiopia	Mosaic Hotel	
10 January 2018	Conakry	Guinea	Noom Hotel Conakry	
12 January 2018	Abidjan	Ivory Coast	Sofitel Abidjan Hôtel Ivoire	
18 January 2018	Kampala	Uganda	Design Hub Kampala	
20 January 2018	Cairo	Egypt	Mantis	
23 January 2018	Asmara	Eritrea	Cinema Roma	
26 January 2018	N'Djamena	Chad	French Institute of Chad	
Asia
3 March 2018	Baku	Azerbaijan	Rotunda Jazz Club	
6 March 2018	Tashkent	Uzbekistan	Ilkhom Theatre	
9 March 2018	Almaty	Kazakhstan	Hard Rock Café	
11 March 2018	Bishkek	Kyrgyzstan	Asanbay Center	
14 March 2018	Ulaanbaatar	Mongolia	Kempinski Hotel Khan Palace	
18 March 2018	Seoul	South Korea	Hanatour V-Hall	
26 April 2018	Muscat	Oman	Crowne Plaza	
27 April 2018	Kuwait City	Kuwait	Dar al Athar al Islamiyyah	
30 April 2018	Ramallah	Palestine	Capers	
3 May 2018	Amman	Jordan	Odeon theater	
4 May 2018	Doha	Qatar	InterContinental	
North America
3 June 2018 (Note: The show on 3 June 2018 was part of Capital Jazz Fest.)	Columbia	United States	Merriweather Post Pavilion	
7 June 2018	Nassau	The Bahamas	Bond Nightclub	
10 June 2018	Kingston	Jamaica	Strawberry Hill	
13 June 2018	St. John's	Antigua and Barbuda	Galley Bay Resort & Spa	
Europe
14 July 2018 (Note: The show on 14 July 2018 was part of VeszprémFest.)	Veszprém	Hungary	História kert	
15 July 2018	Villafranca di Verona	Italy	Scaligero Castle	
17 July 2018	Serravalle	San Marino	Palace Hotel	
19 July 2018 (Note: The show on 19 July 2018 was part of jazzopen.)	Stuttgart	Germany	Schloßplatz	
20 July 2018 (Note: The show on 20 July 2018 was part of Colours of Ostrava.)	Ostrava	Czechia	Lower Vítkovice	
22 July 2018 (Note: The show on 22 July 2018 was part of MEO marés vivas.)	Porto	Portugal	Cabedelo do Douro Beach	
28 July 2018 (Note: The show on 28 July 2018 was part of Usadba Jazz.)	Saint Petersburg	Russia	Kirov Central Park of Culture and Recreation	
9 August 2018 (Note: The show on 9 August 2018 was part of the Stars in Town festival.)	Schaffhausen	Switzerland	Festivalgelände Herrenacker	
North America
11 August 2018 (Note: The show on 11 August 2018 was part of Richmond Jazz and Music Festival.)	Richmond	United States	Maymont	
Europe
12 October 2018	St. Julian's	Malta	Hugo's Terrace	
Africa
14 October 2018	Niamey	Niger	Level Club & Lounge	
18 October 2018	Bangui	Central African Republic	La brasserie KISS	
20 October 2018	Victoria	Seychelles	Tamassa Lounge and Bar	
25 October 2018	Antananarivo	Madagascar	KUDéTA	
27 October 2018	Moroni	Comoros	Golden Tulip Grande Comore Moroni Resort & Spa	
2 November 2018	Hargeisa	Somalia	Hiddo Dhowr	
North America
27 November 2018	Gros Islet	Saint Lucia	Harbor Club St. Lucia, Curio Collection by Hilton	
30 November 2018	Charlestown	Saint Kitts and Nevis	Nevis Performing Arts Center	
South America
3 December 2018	Buenos Aires	Argentina	Teatro Colón	
5 December 2018	São Paulo	Brazil	Tom Brasil	
7 December 2018	Mostazal	Chile	Gran Arena Monticello	
Antarctica
December 2018	Antarctica			
North America
21 December 2018	Belize City	Belize	The Signature Lounge	
17 January 2019 (Note: The show on 17 January 2019 was part of International Jazz Festival Plaza Havana.)	Havana	Cuba	National Theatre of Cuba	
20 January 2019 (Note: The show on 20 January 2019 was part of Naniki Barbados Music Festival.)	Surinam	Barbados	Naniki	
22 January 2019	Roseau	Dominica	Alliance française de la Dominique	
26 January 2019 (Note: The show on 26 January 2019 was part of the Papjazz festival.)	Port-au-Prince	Haiti	Karibe Hotel	
28 January 2019	Georgetown	Guyana	Eucalyptus Garden Theatre	
30 January 2019	Paramaribo	Suriname	Courtyard by Marriott	
Asia
25 February 2019	Bandar Seri Begawan	Brunei	JIS Arts Centre	
1 March 2019	Al-Malikiyah	Syria	Unknown	
5 March 2019	Duhok	Iraq	Unknown	
7 March 2019	Ashgabat	Turkmenistan	Watan Theatre	
9 March 2019	Dushanbe	Tajikistan	Istiqlol Sports Bar	
13 March 2019	Pyongyang	North Korea	International Cinema Hall	
16 March 2019	Islamabad	Pakistan	Unknown	
Africa
6 April 2019 (Note: The show on 6 April 2019 was part of Djunta Mon por Moçambique, a charity concert in benefit of the Cyclone Idai victims in Mozambique.)	Praia	Cape Verde	Pestana Trópico	
Europe
10 April 2019	Stockholm	Sweden	O-Baren	
Oceania
15 April 2019	Koror	Palau	Palau Central Hotel	
20 April 2019	Port Moresby	Papua New Guinea	Lamana Hotel	
22 April 2019	Honiara	Solomon Islands	Coral Sea Resort & Casino	
24 April 2019	Port Vila	Vanuatu	K2	
26 April 2019	Savusavu	Fiji	Jean-Michel Cousteau Resort	
27 April 2019	Nukuʻalofa	Tonga	New Zealand High Commission in Tonga	
1 May 2019	Funafuti	Tuvalu	Funafuti International Airport	
4 May 2019	Yangor	Nauru	Nauru Centennial Hall	
7 May 2019	Apia	Samoa	Funway Park	
9 May 2019	Betio	Kiribati	Betio Sports Complex	
11 May 2019	Laura	Marshall Islands	Laura Beach	
14 May 2019	Peidie	Federated States of Micronesia	Cupid's	
Asia
19 May 2019	Lhasa	China	Unknown	
Africa
22 May 2019	Kinshasa	Democratic Republic of the Congo	Showbuzz	
25 May 2019	Bujumbura	Burundi	Arena	
27 May 2019	Juba	South Sudan	Acacia Village	
Asia
3 June 2019	Kabul	Afghanistan	Unknown	
23 June 2019	Jeddah	Saudi Arabia	Unknown	
North America
21 June 2019 (Note: The show on 21 June 2019 was part of the Summer Skolstice festival.)	Eagan	United States	Twin Cities Orthopedics Performance Center	
Africa
30 June 2019	Tripoli	Libya	Gargarish Park	
1 July 2019	Al Mahrah	Yemen	Unknown	
3 July 2019 (Note: The show on 3 July 2019 was part of the Pedralbes Gardens Festival.)	Barcelona	Spain	Palau Reial de Pedralbes	

=== Cancelled shows ===
Date	City	Country	Venue	Reason for cancellation	Ref.
16 April 2016	Durants	Barbados	Holders House	Cancelled so Stone could be with her sick dog. Initially postponed to 5 May, but later cancelled by Stone's team.	
4 July 2019	Kish Island	Iran	Unknown	Cancelled by the Government of Iran due to violating Iran's women's rights laws.	
