= Introducing Joss Stone =

2007 studio album by Joss Stone

Studio album by Joss Stone
- Released: 9 March 2007
- Recorded: April 2006 – January 2007
- Studio: Blakeslee Recording Co. (North Hollywood, California) (Note: Track 1; strings on tracks 2, 4, 5, 7, 8 and 14; horns on tracks 4, 5, 7 and 14); Compass Point (Nassau, Bahamas) (Note: Tracks 2–5 and 7–14); Electric Lady (New York City) (Note: Tracks 3 and 6); Legacy (New York City) (Note: Strings on track 3); The Plant (Sausalito, California) (Note: Track 6); Sonikwire (Irvine, California) (Note: Additional recording on track 7); Clinton (New York City) (Note: Strings on tracks 9–13)
- Genre: R&B; hip-pop; soul; hip hop
- Length: 55:47
- Label: Virgin
- Producer: Raphael Saadiq

Joss Stone chronology
Mind Body & Soul Sessions: Live in New York City (2004)	Introducing Joss Stone (2007)	Colour Me Free! (2009)

Alternative cover
- Japanese cover

Singles from Introducing Joss Stone
- 1. "Tell Me 'bout It" Released: 5 March 2007; 2. "Tell Me What We're Gonna Do Now" Released: 23 July 2007; 3. "Baby Baby Baby" Released: 23 December 2007

Introducing Joss Stone (stylised as Introducing... Joss Stone) is the third studio album by English singer and songwriter Joss Stone, released on 9 March 2007 by Virgin Records. Stone began writing the album in April 2006 in Barbados, before meeting up with producer Raphael Saadiq in the Bahamas to record the songs. Introducing Joss Stone also features guest vocal appearances by rapper Common and singer Lauryn Hill.

Upon its release, the album was met with generally positive reviews from music critics. Introducing Joss Stone was not as commercially successful as Stone's previous albums in her native United Kingdom, peaking at number 12 on the UK Albums Chart and selling 27,000 copies in its first week. In the United States, it debuted at number two on the Billboard 200 with first-week sales of 118,000 units, which broke the record at the time for the highest debut for a British female solo artist on the chart. It also performed well across continental Europe, charting inside the top 10 in several countries. The album has sold 1.3 million copies worldwide.

== Background and recording ==
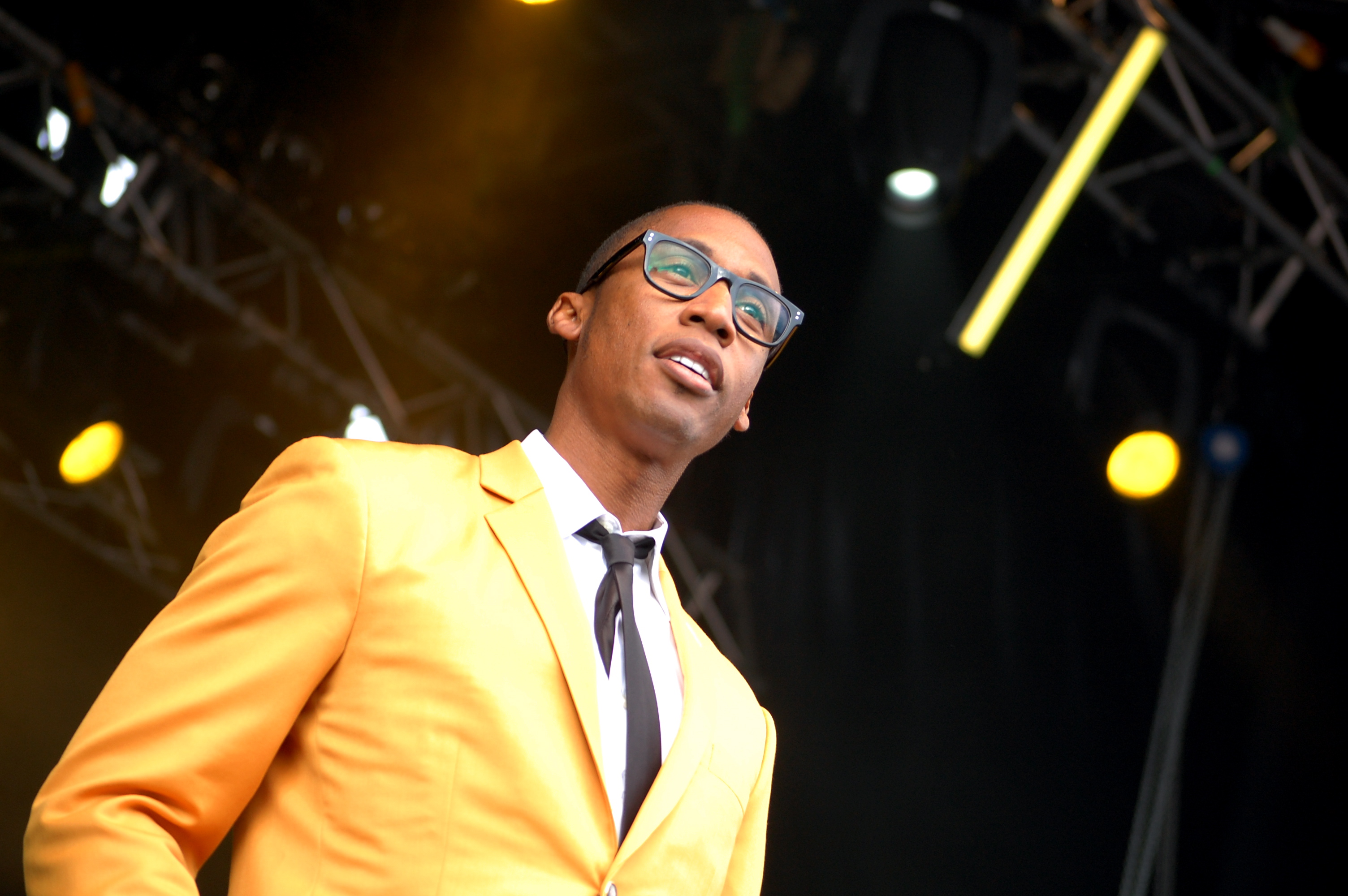
Raphael Saadiq produced the album and co-wrote several tracks

Chris Anokute was hired by Virgin Records chairman Jason Flom to A&R Introducing Joss Stone with a budget of $1 million, which Anokute described to HitQuarters as his "first real A&R job". In April 2006, Flom sent Stone to Barbados with Anokute for two months, where she began writing the lyrics and he helped her develop the songs. Stone wrote an estimated 60 songs. In collaboration with Stone's manager Marty Maidenberg and Merck Mercuriadis, Anokute developed the vision for the album, enlisting producers and musicians such as Raphael Saadiq, Novel, Dallas Austin and Common. Anokute also arranged a duet with Lauryn Hill, who had not guested on anyone else's record since her debut album, The Miseducation of Lauryn Hill (1998).

After spending months in Barbados, Stone travelled to Nassau, Bahamas, to meet up with Saadiq, who produced the entire album. "Raphael is the most incredible musician I've ever met in my whole life", Stone said. "Musically, I feel like he reads my mind. I'll give him a look and he'll know exactly what I want." The two spent two months in Nassau recording at Compass Point Studios, followed by the album's mixing at Electric Lady Studios in New York City.

== Release and promotion ==
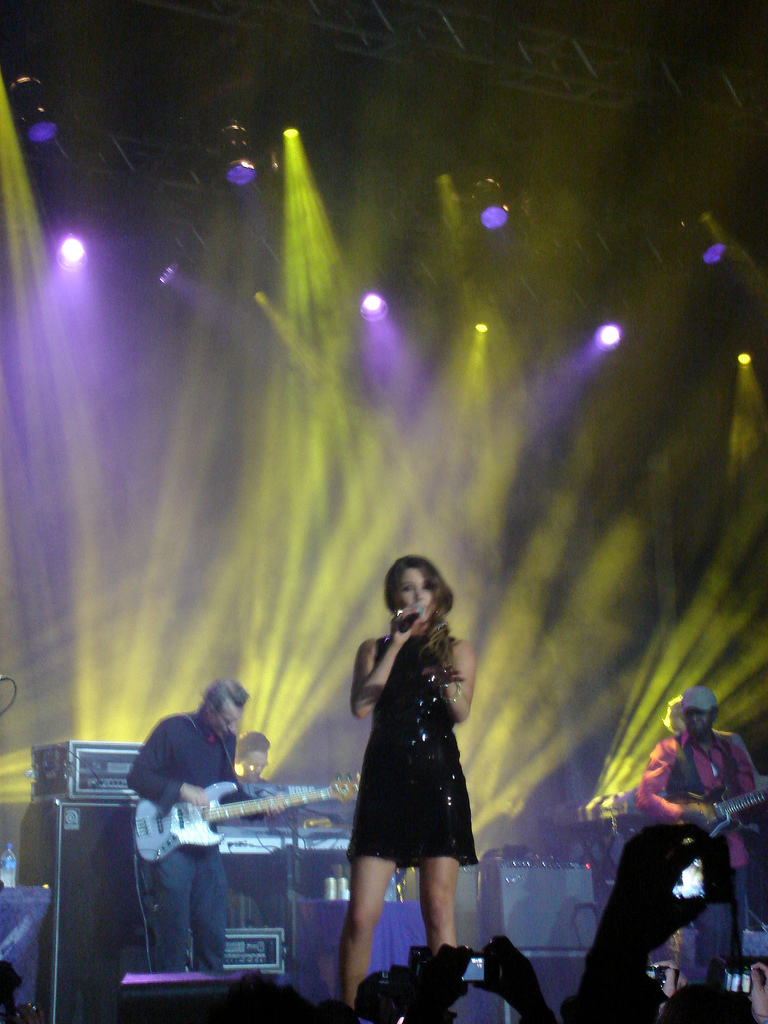
Stone performing at Pepsi on Stage in Porto Alegre, Brazil, in June 2008

On 13 March 2007, VH1 launched a music series titled Album Autopsy: Introducing Joss Stone on its broadband video channel VSPOT. The series took an in-depth look at the entire album process, including Stone's songwriting process, recording sessions, creation of the album cover art and interviews with Stone and people involved in the album's production. The deluxe edition of the album includes a bonus DVD containing behind-the-scenes footage, interviews with Stone and the music video for "Tell Me 'bout It".

From March to June 2007, Stone performed on several American television shows to promote the album, including Late Show with David Letterman, Tavis Smiley, Today, The Early Show, The Late Late Show with Craig Ferguson, The Tonight Show with Jay Leno, Dancing with the Stars, The Ellen DeGeneres Show and Live! with Kelly and Michael. According to Stone, her record label cancelled all her then-upcoming press appearances to promote the album in the United Kingdom, as a result of the backlash that her appearance at the 2007 Brit Awards received from the British media.

Stone toured North America in support of the album from 27 April to 13 June 2007, visiting 16 cities in total, including Philadelphia, New Orleans, San Francisco, Vancouver, Seattle, Chicago, Toronto, Montreal, New York City and Boston. Two months later, Stone embarked on a North American late-summer tour, which ran from 27 August to 29 September 2007 and covered 12 cities: Los Angeles; Park City, Utah; Snowmass Village, Colorado; Seattle; Jacksonville, Oregon; Las Vegas; Mexico City; Austin, Texas; Biloxi, Mississippi; Chicago; San Francisco; and Kansas City, Missouri.

== Singles ==
"Tell Me 'bout It" was released on 5 March 2007 as the lead single from Introducing Joss Stone. The song peaked at number 28 on the UK Singles Chart, and became Stone's first solo single to chart on the US Billboard Hot 100, reaching number 83. The album's second single, "Tell Me What We're Gonna Do Now", features rapper Common and was released on 23 July 2007, peaking at number 84 on the UK Singles Chart.

Despite not being released as a single, "Bruised but Not Broken" was sent to urban adult contemporary radio in the United States on 17 July 2007, allowing the song to reach number 55 on the Hot R&B/Hip-Hop Songs chart and number 13 on the Hot Adult R&B Airplay chart. It was ultimately ranked number 38 on Radio & Records's urban AC year-end chart of 2007 with 9,049 plays. "Baby Baby Baby" was released on 23 December 2007 as the album's third and final single. The song reached number eight on the UK R&B Singles Chart, but failed to chart on any other major charts.

== Critical reception ==
Professional ratings
Aggregate scores
Source	Rating
Metacritic	64/100
Review scores
Source	Rating
AllMusic	3/5 stars
Entertainment Weekly	B−
The Guardian	3/5 stars
The Independent	2/5 stars
NME	2/10
PopMatters	7/10
Rolling Stone	3/5 stars
Slant Magazine	3/5 stars
The Times	2/5 stars
Yahoo! Music UK	7/10 stars

Introducing Joss Stone received generally positive reviews from music critics. At Metacritic, which assigns a normalised rating out of 100 to reviews from mainstream publications, the album received an average score of 64, based on 22 reviews. Rolling Stone's Christian Hoard felt that "[t]here are a couple of moments on Stone's third album when she clobbers a melody with enough showy vocal oomph to make even Christina Aguilera fans squirm. But for the most part, Stone employs her remarkable instrument with focus and nuance on Introducing, and the result is an album full of solid pop-wise R&B." Mike Joseph of PopMatters commented that "[i]t's certainly the first great R&B album I've heard this year. While there's still the occasional affectation that I wish she would get rid of, Stone has grown into her music quite a bit."

Tim Perlich of Canadian newspaper Now noted, "With the fast-maturing Stone gaining greater control of her powerful pipes and a recent breakup adding to the underlying sexual tension while stoking the creative fire, the craftily reconstituted 70s R&B concept works exceptionally well." Blender critic David Browne wrote, "Nearly every song is a souped-up retro-funk tornado, pushed along by blaxploitation-soundtrack guitars, scenery-chewing backup singers and, of course, Stone's husky pipes." Both Billboard and Entertainment Weekly praised Saadiq's production; the former called it "brimming with horns and seriously in-the-pocket rhythm sections, but there are also enough hip-hop touches and contemporary arrangements to keep the tracks in the now", while the latter opined that "[h]e brings a strong focus to Introducing Joss Stone, blending the digital crispness of modern R&B with Stone's preferred flavors of retro: swooping Motown-style strings, girl-group background vocals, gutbucket soul guitar." In a review for AllMusic, Stephen Thomas Erlewine found that "Introducing does sound brighter, fresher than her other two albums, pitched partway between Amy Winehouse and Back to Basics Christina yet sounding very much like Texas at their prime, but it's all surface change."

== Commercial performance ==
Introducing Joss Stone debuted at number 12 on the UK Albums Chart, selling 27,000 copies in its first week. The album was certified silver by the British Phonographic Industry (BPI) on 22 July 2013, denoting shipments in excess of 60,000 copies. The album debuted on the US Billboard 200 at number two with first-week sales of over 118,000 copies, becoming Stone's highest-peaking album in the United States to date and the highest-charting debut for a British female solo artist on the Billboard 200 in the Nielsen SoundScan era, beating the record previously held by Amy Winehouse, whose album Back to Black had debuted at number seven the week before. This record was eventually broken by Leona Lewis's Spirit, which debuted at number one on the Billboard 200 in April 2008. The Recording Industry Association of America (RIAA) certified the album gold on 1 May 2007, within two months of release. As of July 2011, it had sold 652,000 copies in the US.

The album debuted at number six on the Canadian Albums Chart and at number one on the R&B albums chart. It was certified gold by the Canadian Recording Industry Association (CRIA) on 11 April 2007 for sales in excess of 50,000 copies. In mainland Europe, Introducing Joss Stone peaked at number one in the Netherlands, and charted within the top five in Belgium and Switzerland, and the top 10 in Austria, Germany, Italy and Portugal. It was less successful in Nordic countries, peaking at number 27 in Norway, number 31 in Sweden and number 38 in Denmark, while failing to chart at all in Finland. Across Oceania, the album charted at number 15 in Australia and at number 17 in New Zealand. In March 2007, EMI reported that Introducing Joss Stone had sold 1.3 million copies worldwide.

== Track listing ==
No.	Title	Writer(s)	Length
1.	"Change (Vinnie Jones Intro)"	Glenn Standridge; Tarsha Proctor-Standridge	0:35
2.	"Girl They Won't Believe It"	Joss Stone; Raphael Saadiq	3:15
3.	"Headturner"	Stone; Billy Mann; Otis Redding	3:16
4.	"Tell Me 'bout It"	Stone; Saadiq; Robert C. Ozuna	2:48
5.	"Tell Me What We're Gonna Do Now" (featuring Common)	Stone; Alonzo "Novel" Stevenson; Tony Reyes; Lonnie Lynn	4:22
6.	"Put Your Hands on Me"	Stone; Saadiq	2:58
7.	"Music" (featuring Lauryn Hill)	Stone; Stevenson; Reyes; Hill; Wyclef Jean; Samuel Michel	3:41
8.	"Arms of My Baby"	Stone; Danny P; Jonathan Shorten	2:52
9.	"Bad Habit"	Stone; P; Shorten	3:41
10.	"Proper Nice"	Stone; Saadiq; Ozuna; Chalmers "Spanky" Alford; Vincent Corea; Jeanne Roberts	3:24
11.	"Bruised but Not Broken"	Diane Warren	4:15
12.	"Baby Baby Baby"	Stone; P; Shorten	4:34
13.	"What Were We Thinking"	Stone; Saadiq	4:24
14.	"Music (Outro)"	Stone; Saadiq	3:48

iTunes Store bonus track
No.	Title	Writer(s)	Length
15.	"Nothing Better Than"	Stone; Beau Dozier	3:52

Amazon digital bonus tracks
No.	Title	Writer(s)	Length
15.	"Music" (live from Toronto)	Stone; Stevenson; Reyes; Hill; Jean; Michel	3:43
16.	"Jet Lag" (live from Toronto)	Mike Mangini; Steve Greenberg; Betty Wright; Shorten; Conner Reeves	3:50

Japanese edition bonus tracks
No.	Title	Writer(s)	Length
15.	"Big Ol' Game"	Stone; Saadiq	4:29
16.	"My God"	Stone; Saadiq	3:50
17.	"Tell Me 'bout It" (music video)

Deluxe edition bonus DVD
No.	Title	Length
1.	"In the Studio"
2.	"Common"
3.	"Strings"
4.	"Choosing Songs"
5.	"On the Set (Tell Me 'bout It)"
6.	"Tour Rehearsal"
7.	"Tell Me 'bout It" (music video)

Special edition bonus disc
No.	Title	Writer(s)	Length
1.	"L-O-V-E"	Bert Kaempfert; Milt Gabler	2:47
2.	"Gimme Shelter" (Angélique Kidjo featuring Joss Stone)	Mick Jagger; Keith Richards	4:10
3.	"Big Ol' Game"	Stone; Saadiq	4:29
4.	"My God"	Stone; Saadiq	3:46
5.	"Music" (live from the Bowery Ballroom)	Stone; Stevenson; Reyes; Hill; Jean; Michel	4:00
6.	"Super Duper Love" (live from the Bowery Ballroom)	Willie Garner	5:29
7.	"Tell Me 'bout It" (live from the Bowery Ballroom)	Stone; Saadiq; Ozuna	5:20
8.	"What Were We Thinking" (live from the Bowery Ballroom)	Stone; Saadiq	5:25
9.	"Tell Me 'bout It" (A Yam Who? Club Rework)	Stone; Saadiq; Ozuna	9:38

=== Notes ===
- "Music (Outro)" ends at 1:40, followed by silence until 3:10, when a hidden track consisting of a short song performed by Stone and Vinnie Jones begins.

=== Sample credits ===
- "Headturner" contains an interpolation of "Respect" by Otis Redding.
- "Music" contains an interpolation of "The Mask" by the Fugees.
- "Proper Nice" contains an interpolation of "Catch Me (I'm Falling)" by Pretty Poison.

== Personnel ==
Credits adapted from the liner notes of Introducing Joss Stone.

=== Musicians ===
- Joss Stone – lead vocals
- Vinnie Jones – voiceover (track 1)
- Joi Gilliam – background vocals (tracks 2–4, 9, 11)
- Keisha Jackson – background vocals (tracks 2–4, 9, 11)
- Jermaine Paul – background vocals (tracks 2–4, 9, 11)
- Raphael Saadiq – bass (tracks 2–14); guitar (tracks 2–4, 6, 9, 10, 12, 13); background vocals (tracks 2, 10, 12, 13); horn arrangements (tracks 3, 4, 8, 12); keyboards (track 6); piano (tracks 7, 14)
- Khari Parker – drums (tracks 2, 5–8, 11–14); percussion (track 2); additional drums (tracks 3, 4, 9, 10)
- Robert Ozuna – additional drums (tracks 2, 5, 6, 11); percussion (tracks 2, 3, 5, 7, 9–12, 14); sitar (track 2); drums (tracks 3, 4, 9, 10, 13); turntablism (tracks 4–7)
- Chalmers "Spanky" Alford – guitar (tracks 2–4, 5, 7–13)
- Lionel Holoman – organ (tracks 2, 3, 5, 7, 13, 14); Rhodes (tracks 8, 11); keyboards (tracks 9, 10); Wurlitzer (track 12)
- Benjamin Wright – string arrangements (tracks 2–5, 7–14); horn arrangements (track 14)
- Anthony Coleman – trumpet (track 3)
- Kenneth "Scooter" Whalum III – tenor saxophone (track 3); baritone saxophone (track 6)
- James Zeller – trombone (track 3)
- Neil Symonette – percussion (tracks 4, 8)
- Common – vocals (track 5)
- Charlie Happiness – clav (track 5)
- Mix Master Mike – turntablism (tracks 6, 12)
- Lauryn Hill – vocals (track 7)
- Priscilla Jones Campbell – background vocals (tracks 8, 12)
- Tino Richardson – saxophone (tracks 8, 12)
- Jawara Adams – trumpet (tracks 8, 12)
- Lois Colin – harp (track 10)

=== The Benjamin Wright Orchestra ===
- Benjamin Wright – conducting
- Stephen Baxter – horn
- Duane Benjamin – horn
- Ron Brown – horn
- Jeffrey Clayton – horn
- Anthony Coleman – horn
- Salvator Cracciolo – horn
- James Ford III – horn
- Matthew Frank – horn
- Lionel Holoman – horn
- Kenneth "Scooter" Whalum III – horn
- James Zeller – horn
- Mark Cargill – concertmaster, violin
- Sanford Allen – violin
- Richard Adkins – violin
- Sandra Billingslea – violin
- Charlie Bisharat – violin
- Susan Chatman – violin
- Robert Chausow – violin
- Cenovia Cummins – violin
- Yvette Devereaux – violin
- Gayle Dixon – violin
- Barry Finclair – violin
- Pamela Gates – violin
- Stanley Hunte – violin
- Marisa McLeod – violin
- Lori Miller – violin
- Cameron Patrick – violin
- Kathleen Robertson – violin
- Lesa Terry – violin
- Alexander Vselensky – violin
- Belinda Whitney – violin
- Miguel Atwood-Ferguson – viola
- Richard Brice – viola
- Christopher Jenkins – viola
- Jorge Moraga – viola
- Patrick Morgan – viola
- Robin Ross – viola
- Orlando Wells – viola
- Lisa Whitfield – viola
- Peggy Baldwin – cello
- Giovanna Clayton – cello
- Ernest Ehrhardt Jr. – cello
- Eileen Folson – cello
- Erik Friedlander – cello
- Ronald Lipscomb – cello
- Miguel Martinez – cello
- Frederick Zlotkin – cello
- Ida Bodin – bass
- Joseph Bongiorno – bass
- Kevin Brandon – bass
- Leon Maleson – bass

=== Technical ===
- Raphael Saadiq – production
- Joss Stone – executive production
- Chuck Brungardt – recording, mixing (all tracks); Pro Tools (track 3)
- Glenn Standridge – recording, mixing, production coordinator
- Marlon Marcel – engineering assistance (tracks 1, 2, 4, 5, 7, 8, 14)
- Steve Greenwell – additional recording (tracks 2, 3, 5, 8–11, 13); vocal recording (tracks 7, 12)
- Oswald Bowe – engineering assistance (tracks 2–5, 7–14)
- Reggie Dozier – strings recording (tracks 2–5, 7–14); horn recording (tracks 4, 5, 7, 14)
- John Tanksley – engineering assistance (tracks 2, 4, 5, 7, 8, 14)
- James Tanksley – engineering assistance (tracks 2, 4, 5, 7, 8, 14)
- Jeremy Mackenzie – Pro Tools (tracks 2, 4, 5, 7, 8, 14)
- Ian Shea – engineering assistance (tracks 2, 8, 9, 11–13)
- Dror Mohar – engineering assistance (tracks 3, 6, 14)
- Isaiah Abolin – engineering assistance (track 3)
- Seamus Tyson – engineering assistance (track 3)
- Scott Somerville – engineering assistance (tracks 3, 6, 12)
- Charlie Stavish – engineering assistance (tracks 4, 5, 7, 10, 12)
- Mike Boden – engineering assistance (tracks 6, 12)
- Dave Larring – additional recording (track 7)
- Luke Smith – engineering assistance (tracks 9–13)
- Justin Kessler – Pro Tools (tracks 9–13)
- Tom Coyne – mastering at Sterling Sound (New York City)

=== Artwork ===
- Joss Stone – art direction
- Sean Mosher-Smith – art direction
- David Gorman – design
- Kate McGregor – art coordination
- Brian Bowen Smith – photography
- Bob Scott – sidebar and peace sign photography
- Jonathan "Meres" Cohen – body painting, graffiti
- Joshua Lutz – mural and art stencils

== Charts ==
=== Weekly charts ===
Weekly chart performance for Introducing Joss Stone
Chart (2007)	Peak position
Australian Albums (ARIA)	15
Australian Urban Albums (ARIA)	4
Austrian Albums (Ö3 Austria)	8
Belgian Albums (Ultratop Flanders)	5
Belgian Albums (Ultratop Wallonia)	36
Canadian Albums (Billboard)	6
Canadian R&B Albums (Nielsen SoundScan)	1
Croatian Albums (HDU)	11
Czech Albums (ČNS IFPI)	28
Danish Albums (Hitlisten)	38
Dutch Albums (Album Top 100)	1
European Albums (Billboard)	3
French Albums (SNEP)	22
German Albums (Offizielle Top 100)	6
Greek International Albums (IFPI)	5
Irish Albums (IRMA)	27
Italian Albums (FIMI)	7
Japanese Albums (Oricon)	37
New Zealand Albums (RMNZ)	17
Norwegian Albums (VG-lista)	27
Polish Albums (ZPAV)	25
Portuguese Albums (AFP)	9
Scottish Albums (OCC)	27
Swedish Albums (Sverigetopplistan)	31
Swiss Albums (Schweizer Hitparade)	2
UK Albums (OCC)	12
UK R&B Albums (OCC)	3
US Billboard 200	2
US Top R&B/Hip-Hop Albums (Billboard)	4

=== Year-end charts ===
Year-end chart performance for Introducing Joss Stone
Chart (2007)	Position
Australian Urban Albums (ARIA)	20
Belgian Albums (Ultratop Flanders)	82
Dutch Albums (Album Top 100)	22
European Albums (Billboard)	88
French Albums (SNEP)	120
German Albums (Offizielle Top 100)	88
Italian Albums (FIMI)	77
Swiss Albums (Schweizer Hitparade)	27
US Billboard 200	92
US Top R&B/Hip-Hop Albums (Billboard)	71

== Certifications ==
Certifications for Introducing Joss Stone
Region	Certification	Certified units/sales
Austria (IFPI Austria)	Gold	10,000^{*}
Canada (Music Canada)	Gold	50,000^{^}
Germany (BVMI)	Gold	100,000^{‡}
Switzerland (IFPI Switzerland)	Platinum	30,000^{^}
United Kingdom (BPI)	Silver	60,000^{^}
United States (RIAA)	Gold	652,000
^{*} Sales figures based on certification alone.^{^} Shipments figures based on certification alone.^{‡} Sales+streaming figures based on certification alone.

== Release history ==
Release history for Introducing Joss Stone
Region	Date	Edition	Label	Ref(s)
Germany	9 March 2007	Standard; deluxe	EMI	
Italy	9 March 2007	Standard; deluxe	EMI	
Netherlands	9 March 2007	Standard; deluxe	EMI	
France	12 March 2007	Standard; deluxe	EMI	
Japan	12 March 2007	Standard	EMI	
United Kingdom	12 March 2007	Standard; deluxe	Relentless	
Sweden	14 March 2007	Standard; deluxe	EMI	
Australia	16 March 2007	Standard	EMI	
Canada	20 March 2007	Standard; deluxe	EMI	
United States	20 March 2007	Standard; deluxe	Virgin	
Netherlands	17 September 2007	Special	EMI	
Germany	27 September 2007	Special	EMI	
Italy	28 September 2007	Special	EMI	
France	2 November 2007	Special	EMI	
United Kingdom	1 April 2008	Special	Relentless	
Sweden	22 July 2008	Special	EMI	
