= Ray Ray (album) =

Studio album by Raphael Saadiq
- Released: October 5, 2004
- Recorded: 2003–04
- Studio: Blakeslee Recording Company (North Hollywood)
- Genres: R&B; funk; soul; neo soul
- Length: 49:03
- Labels: Pookie Entertainment; Navarre
- Producers: Michael Angelo; Jake and the Phatman; Raphael Saadiq (also exec.); Kelvin Wooten

Raphael Saadiq chronology
Instant Vintage (2002)	Ray Ray (2004)	The Way I See It (2008)

Singles from Ray Ray
- 1. "Chic Like You" Released: 2004; 2. "I Want You Back" Released: 2004

Ray Ray is the second studio album by American R&B singer, songwriter, and producer Raphael Saadiq. It was released October 5, 2004, by his record label, Pookie Entertainment. After being dropped from Universal Records, Saadiq formed the label and recorded the album. He pursued a 1970s-inspired musical direction that was looser than his 2002 debut album, Instant Vintage, and produced Ray Ray with Michael Angelo, Jake and the Phatman, and Kelvin Wooten.

Titled after Saadiq's childhood nickname, Ray Ray features funky, groove-oriented songs and Saadiq's characteristic fusion of programmed beats, strings, neo soul melodies, and live guitar. They are arranged in a song cycle and touch on lighthearted romantic themes and socially conscious messages.

The album debuted at number 86 on the U.S. Billboard 200 chart, but fell off the next week. It received generally positive reviews from music critics. Although some were ambivalent towards its loose blaxploitation concept and Saadiq's songwriting, critics praised the album's production quality and vintage musical approach.

== Background ==
In 2002, Saadiq released his debut solo album Instant Vintage, which received critical acclaim and earned him five Grammy Award nominations. However, despite attaining a following among listeners in Europe, it was largely ignored by contemporary R&B listeners in the United States and did not sell well. After its release, he was dropped by his record label Universal Records.

Saadiq subsequently formed his own label, Pookie Entertainment, on which he released the double live album All Hits at the House of Blues in 2003. The live album showcased Saadiq's solo material and songs he recorded as a part of Tony! Toni! Toné! during the late 1980s and 1990s. Saadiq also continued working as a producer for other recording artists, including Erykah Badu, Kelis, Jill Scott, Nappy Roots, Earth, Wind & Fire, Sunshine Anderson, and Jaguar Wright.

== Recording and production ==
Teedra Moses (pictured in 2007) duetted with Saadiq on two of the album's songs.

Having fulfilled his creative ambition with Instant Vintage, he sought a looser direction for a follow-up studio album. He said of the direction for Ray Ray in an interview for Rolling Stone, "You only get to make a first statement one time, and I had definite ideas of how I wanted it to sound. Ray Ray represents a more fun side of what I do. I wanted to have a good time with it." In an interview for The Baltimore Sun, Saadiq discussed the inspiration behind the album's blaxploitation concept:

I was watching some Rudy Ray Moore flicks, some Superfly and got to thinking that all this is a part of our history, you know? It seems more Caucasians use [black] images more than we do. Quentin Tarantino uses them in his movies, especially the '70s stuff ... With Ray Ray, I thought I could, you know, embrace that part of our history and those images from that time.

Saadiq recorded the album with producers Michael Angelo, Focus..., and Jake and the Phatman, among others. He also worked with singer-songwriter Joi, former Tony! Toni! Toné! member D'wayne Wiggins, singer-songwriter Teedra Moses, singer Dawn Robinson, formerly of Saadiq's other group Lucy Pearl, singer-songwriter Babyface, and rapper Allie Baba, Saadiq's nephew.

== Music and lyrics ==
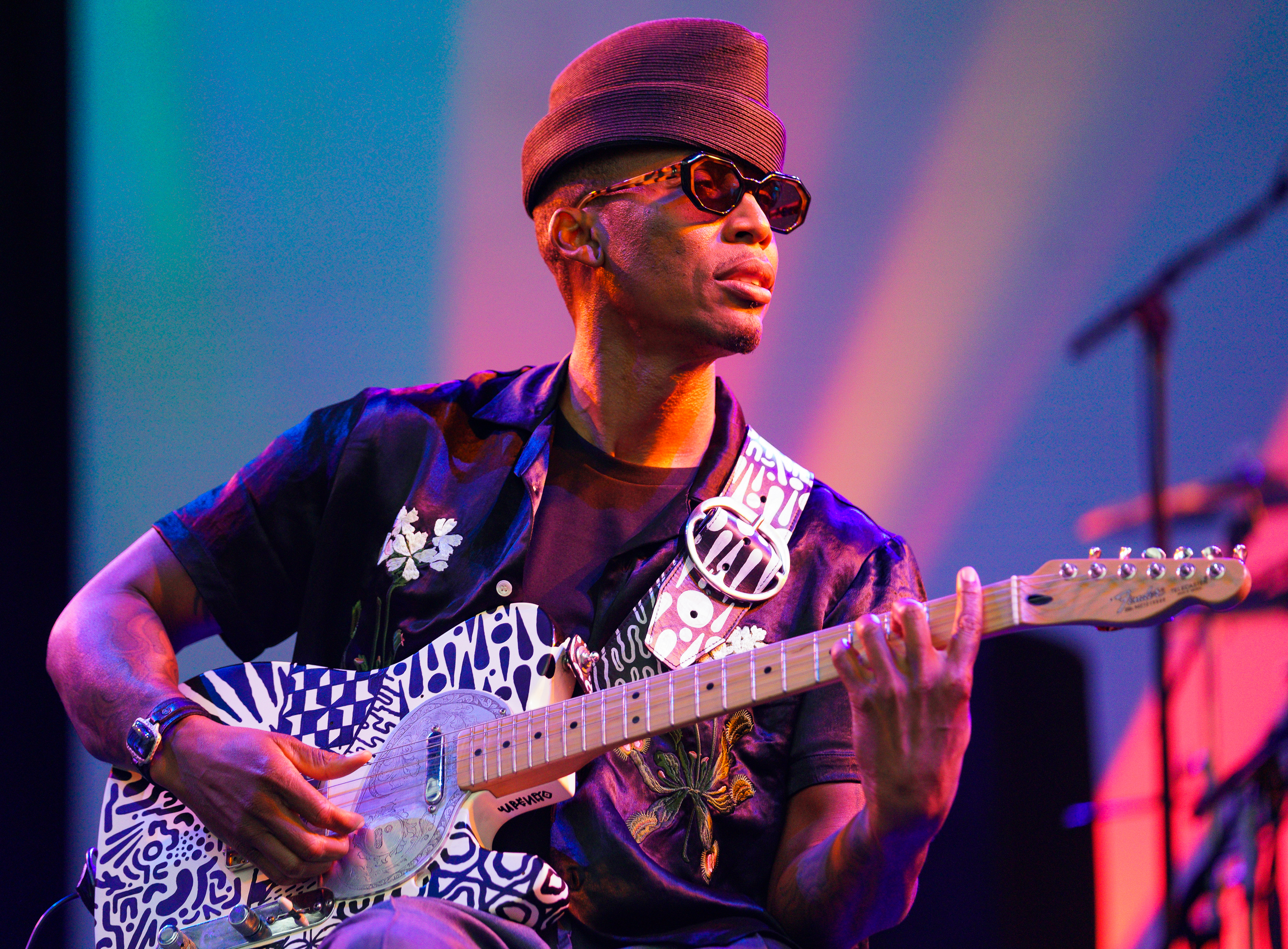
Saadiq (2018) plays guitar, among other instruments, on the album.

The album contains a more funk-oriented sound than Instant Vintage, accompanied by generally romantic and some message-oriented themes. In comparison to his first album, Saadiq regarded Ray Ray as "more aggressive, more radio-friendly ... one of those good, Saturday-playing records". Its music incorporates R&B, funk, and soul styles, along with elements of gospel and hip hop music.

As with Instant Vintage, Ray Ray features Saadiq's characteristic fusion of programmed beats, strings, neo soul melodies, and live guitars. The songs are mostly mid-tempo and groove-based, and also feature rubbery bass lines and horns. AllMusic's Andy Kellman views that the album's music is "a little funkier and a lot more energetic than 2002's Instant Vintage, yet just as full of Saadiq's stylish flourishes." He writes of the album's subject matter, "for every song that's charmingly simple and full of lighthearted romantic sentiments, there's something message-oriented". Ken Capobianco of The Boston Globe characterizes the album's mood as "playful" and writes that it is composed as "a bouncy song cycle that's a throwback to '70s funk."

Clearly a man possessed by a bygone era, Saadiq transforms himself into a musical superhero, a good-natured, pseudopimp armed with a bass guitar and a tendency to fall instantly in love.

— Andrew Simon, Vibe

The album's first two tracks, "Blaxploitation" and "Ray Ray Theme", serve as audio vignettes introducing Saadiq's alter ego as the main character of a faux-Blaxploitation soundtrack. The latter track has singer Joi calling upon the character, addressing him as "soul brother number one", to "shoot me with your bop gun". Both songs help establish the character as a ladies' man with a penchant for fast cars. However, the concept is not sustained in the following songs on the album. "I Know Shuggie Otis" is a tribute to psychedelic recording artist Shuggie Otis and features a screeching guitar solo. "This One" features orchestral pop and gleeful tones. "Chic Like You" contains elements of G-funk, gospel-styled, vocal "mmms" and fluid, funky keyboards. Its lyrics depict sensual images: "She soaks in green tea lotion / Her legs are so outspoken".

"I Want You Back"
The duet with singer-songwriter Teedra Moses features Saadiq's characteristic nimble bass playing.

"Not a Game" features a spare hip hop beat and an emotional vocal delivery by Saadiq. "Rifle Love" utilizes the sounds of barrel clicks and gunshots as a rhythm section in its chorus. Both "Live Without You" and "I Want You Back" are pleas to an ex-lover and have romantic crooning by Saadiq over a gritty funk groove. "I Want You Back" also features elements of Miami bass and electro-styled synthesizers. Saadiq adopts a falsetto/high tenor singing voice on "Grown Folks". It features socially conscious lyrics and a Latin-tinged arrangement. "Save Us" has a theme of disillusionment and features sparse keyboard and a somber refrain.

== Title and packaging ==
The album was titled as a reference to his mother's nickname for him, also a childhood name. Its cover artwork was inspired by the blaxploitation films of the 1970s. It shows Saadiq dressed in a vintage cornflower blue suit, knicker pants, and lime green argyle socks, while leaning on a white 1967 Mercury Cougar.

== Release ==
Ray Ray was released by Pookie Entertainment on October 5, 2004, in the United States. That same year, two singles were released in promotion of the album: "Chic Like You" and "I Want You Back". The album debuted at number 86 on the US Billboard 200 chart in the week of October 23. It was the album's only appearance on the chart. Ray Ray also spent eight weeks on the Billboard Top R&B/Hip-Hop Albums, on which it peaked at number 18. It eventually went out of print in the US In France, the album charted for two weeks and reached number 145.

== Critical reception ==
Professional ratings
Aggregate scores
Source	Rating
Metacritic	66/100
Review scores
Source	Rating
AllMusic	3.5/5 stars
Entertainment Weekly	A−
The Independent	4.5/5 stars
Paste	3.5/5 stars
Slant Magazine	3/5 stars
The Sunday Times	4/5 stars

Ray Ray was met with generally positive reviews. At Metacritic, which assigns a normalized rating out of 100 to reviews from professional publications, the album received an average score of 66, based on six reviews.

Reviewing the album in The Independent, Phil Johnson called it "madder and badder" than Saadiq's debut record and found its sound "more radical". "No one can distress a production like Raphael", he said, believing the singer's "multi-instrumental talents and Stevie Wonder-ish voice make him a Prince for the Noughties." Andria Lisle of Paste commended Saadiq's "versatility" and found the album "softer than Cee-lo and sexier than Ricky Fanté". Neil Drumming of Entertainment Weekly complimented Saadiq's "bass virtuosity" and "grown and sexy" vibe, although he viewed some of his songwriting as "amateur". The Boston Globe's Ken Capobianco observed an "overriding sense of joy and mischief throughout jams", and found Saadiq's "musical exuberance ... infectious". Although he found it lacking a "centerpiece track", Capobianco ultimately praised the album as a "funk" departure from most of the contemporary soul he found "studied and overly reverent". Slant Magazine editor Sal Cinquemani found it flawed as a concept album, but commended Saadiq for "conjuring soul greats like Stevie Wonder ('Live Without You'), Curtis Mayfield ('Grown Folks'), and Prince ('I Know Shuggie Otis') throughout", and stated, "just because the storyline(s) ... ceases to exist after the first few songs that doesn't mean the rest of the tracks aren't good." Geoffrey Himes of The Washington Post noted Saadiq for having "a rare gift for linking seductive melodies to slinky grooves" and stated, "Ray Ray is just a collection of disconnected songs ... failing to establish a narrative. But what terrific songs they are."

Allmusic's Andy Kellman complimented its "varied" subject matter and wrote in summation, "Ray Ray occasionally loses focus, slipping into moments that are either undercooked or worthy of the cutting room, but it's enjoyable enough to keep his followers happy and will certainly act as a remedy for those who don't like the gold-bricked path being taken by mainstream R&B." Ethan Brown of New York stated, "Despite its faults—and there are many ... Ray Ray is a startlingly inventive record", and found Saadiq "at his best when he revives the sad soul of Sam Cooke" on songs like "Not a Game". Andrew Simon of Vibe found a "handful" of songs to be poorly conceived and viewed that the album's strength was Saadiq's "crisp" production and bass playing, writing that "On a dime, the thick tones of the multi-instrumentalist's weapon of choice go from low and rumbly to high and tight." He ultimately commended Saadiq's intentions with the album's concept, stating "Ray Ray hits more than it misses in its celebration of a time when George was making the mothership connection and Marvin just wanted to get it on."

== Track listing ==
Ray Ray track listing
No.	Title	Writer(s)	Producer(s)	Length
1.	"Blaxploitation"	Raphael Saadiq; Glenn Standridge; Bobby Ozuna	Saadiq; Jake and the Phatman^{[a]}	0:31
2.	"Ray Ray Theme" (featuring Joi)	Saadiq; Joi Gilliam; Kelvin Wooten	Saadiq; Wooten	2:36
3.	"I Know Shuggie Otis"	Saadiq	Saadiq	2:32
4.	"This One"	Saadiq; Michael Angelo Saulsberry; Taura Jackson	Saadiq; Michael Angelo	3:34
5.	"Chic Like You" (featuring Allie Baba)	Saadiq; Saulsberry; Alvie Wiggins	Saadiq; Michael Angelo	4:01
6.	"Live Without You"	Saadiq; Ozuna; Standridge	Saadiq; Jake and the Phatman^{[a]}	4:49
7.	"Detroit Girl"	Saadiq; Saulsberry	Saadiq; Michael Angelo	4:05
8.	"Not a Game" (featuring Babyface)	Saadiq; Wooten; Jackson	Saadiq; Wooten	2:58
9.	"Rifle Love" (featuring Tony! Toni! Toné! and Lucy Pearl)	Saadiq; Wooten; Jackson	Saadiq; Wooten	4:18
10.	"Chic" (featuring Teedra Moses)	Saadiq; Moses	Saadiq	3:40
11.	"I Want You Back" (featuring Teedra Moses)	Saadiq; Moses; Ozuna; Standridge	Saadiq; Jake and the Phatman^{[a]}	3:48
12.	"I Love Her"	Saadiq; Ozuna; Standridge	Saadiq; Jake and the Phatman^{[a]}	4:33
13.	"Grown Folks"	Saadiq; Ozuna; Standridge	Saadiq; Jake and the Phatman^{[a]}	4:21
14.	"Save Us"	Saadiq	Saadiq	3:13

UK bonus track
No.	Title	Writer(s)	Producer(s)	Length
15.	"Scream"	Saadiq	Saadiq	4:46

Notes

- ^{^[a]} signifies co-producer(s)

== Personnel ==
Credits for Ray Ray adapted from liner notes.

- Michael Angelo – audio production, bass, composer, drum programming, guitar, horn arrangements, keyboards
- Jessie Arellano – assistant engineer
- Allie Baba – rap, vocals
- Babyface – vocals
- Battlecat – clavinet
- William Blochinger – photography
- Torrey Devitto – violin
- Jake and the Phatman – drum programming, drums, flute arrangement, guitar, horn arrangements, keyboards, organ, percussion, producer
- Joi – composer, performer, vocals
- Lawrence "Master Poe" Lejohn – vocals
- Lucy Pearl – performer, vocals
- Sundra "Sun" Manning – keyboards
- Teedra Moses – composer, vocals
- Autumn Moultrie – make-up
- Bobby Ozuna – composer
- Will Ragland – art direction
- Dawn Robinson – vocals
- Daniel Romero – engineer, mixing
- Raphael Saadiq – audio production, bass, composer, drums, executive producer, flute arrangement, guitar, horn arrangements, keyboards, producer, programming, various, vocals
- Anette Sharvit – production coordination
- Kris Solem – mastering
- Glenn Standridge – composer
- James Tanksley – engineer
- John Tanksley – audio engineer, engineer
- Tony! Toni! Toné! – vocals
- D'Wayne Wiggins – vocals
- Kelvin Wooten – audio production, bass, composer, drum programming, guitar, keyboards, producer, string arrangements
- Benjamin F. Wright – arranger, conductor
- The Benjamin Wright Orchestra – strings
- Morgan Zarate – drums

== Charts ==
Weekly chart performance for Ray Ray
Chart (2001)	Peak position
French Albums (SNEP)	145
Japanese Albums (Oricon)	289
US Billboard 200	86
US Top R&B/Hip-Hop Albums (Billboard)	18
