= Instant Vintage =

Studio album by Raphael Saadiq
- Released: June 11, 2002
- Recorded: 2001–2002
- Studio: Blakeslee Recording Company; Track Record (North Hollywood); Cello Recording; Larabee Sound Studio East; Larrabee West Recording; The Record Plant (Los Angeles); Darp (Atlanta); Enterprise Recording; O'Henry Sound (Burbank); Musty Attic (Huntsville); Tek Lab (Cincinnati); The House of Blues (Encino); The Mint Recording (Oakland); The Pookie Lab (Sacramento)
- Genre: R&B; soul; neo soul; quiet storm
- Length: 76:17
- Label: Universal
- Producer: Raphael Saadiq; Jake & the Phatman; Timothy Christian Riley; Kelvin Wooten

Raphael Saadiq chronology
Instant Vintage (2002)	Ray Ray (2004)

Singles from Instant Vintage
- 1. "Faithfull" Released: 2002; 2. "Be Here" Released: 2002; 3. "Still Ray" Released: 2002

Instant Vintage is the debut solo album by American R&B singer and record producer Raphael Saadiq. It was his first full-length solo album after spending much of his post-Tony! Toni! Toné! career as a session player and producer. The record was a critical success but underperformed commercially, leading to Saadiq's departure from Universal Records.

== Recording and production ==
After leaving the R&B band Tony! Toni! Toné!, Saadiq formed the group Lucy Pearl with Dawn Robinson and Ali Shaheed Muhammad while working as a producer and session player. He then began his career as a solo artist with Instant Vintage. The album was recorded in approximately seven months with producers Jake and the Phatman and Raymond Murray, among others. During the sessions, guest contributions were improvised by Angie Stone, T-Boz, Calvin Richardson, Hi-Tek, and Saadiq's older brother, Randy Wiggins. Saadiq also produced songs for other artists at the studio during this period, including Macy Gray, TLC, the Isley Brothers, Joi, and Kelly Price.

For Instant Vintage, Saadiq drew on R&B, soul, hip hop, funk, rock, jazz, and doo-wop sounds, the result being described by him as "gospeldelic". He also recorded string and horn sections onto vinyl and scratched the recordings back into the final mix, such as on the opening track, "Doing What I Can". This song also incorporated voice recordings summarizing Saadiq's credits as a member of Tony! Toni! Toné! and Lucy Pearl. The closing track, "Skyy, Can You Feel Me", was written by him the night of the singer Aaliyah's death. Saadiq later told Billboard, "I was just feeling kind of 'angel-y' about her."

== Title and packaging ==
According to Rolling Stone journalist Tracy E. Hopkins, Instant Vintage was titled as a joking reference to "the disposable nature of contemporary music". For the cover photo shoot, Saadiq had the makeup artist draw a circle around his eye like Pete the Pup from the Our Gang comedy series. "It was fun to watch people make up what it meant", Saadiq recalled. "I didn't even know what the hell it meant. Later, I thought it meant that I was focused, that I had my eye on what I wanted out of my career."

== Release ==
Instant Vintage was released by Universal Records on June 11, 2002, to poor sales. According to New York magazine's Ethan Brown, the album "quickly found fans in Europe—illicit remixes even helped spawn a new genre in the U.K. called 'pirate soul'", but it "struggled to find an audience among R&B fans accustomed to teenage superstars and a neo-soul scene that found Saadiq weird and insufficiently reverential about the seventies soul sources he riffed on". Saadiq supported the album with a promotional concert tour from May to June 2002, performing in 11 American cities; including New York, Los Angeles, and Atlanta; before embarking on another tour soon after with Joi. After the record's disappointing commercial performance, Universal ended its contract with Saadiq, who went on to release his second album Ray Ray in 2004 on his own record label, Pookie Entertainment.

== Critical reception ==
Professional ratings
Review scores
Source	Rating
AllMusic	4/5 stars
Blender	4/5 stars
Chicago Sun-Times	3.5/4 stars
Encyclopedia of Popular Music	3/5 stars
Entertainment Weekly	B
Los Angeles Times	2.5/4 stars
Pitchfork	8.0/10
Spin	7/10
USA Today	3.5/4 stars
The Village Voice	A−

Instant Vintage received positive reviews from critics. Chicago Sun-Times critic Jeff Vrabel deemed it "almost unfairly effortless R&B that falls about halfway between neo-soul and Curtis Mayfield", adding that Saadiq's "array of sweet melodies, gently rolling instrumentation and melancholy street tales such as 'You're the One That I Like' shimmer with soul". Yahoo! Music's Dan Leroy called it "one of those rare [R&B] creations that makes a virtue of its sprawl" and believed Saadiq's inventive productions and lyrics distinguished his reappropriated classic soul sounds. Robert Christgau wrote in The Village Voice that the record's "structural strategy draws on erotic strategy--start off indirect and bloom into arousal, mouthwork, song. Individual tracks work that way, and so does the album as a whole, which honors the sacred memory of Tony Toni Toné more supplely than Lucy Pearl and may be more woman-friendly to boot." New York Times critic Ben Ratliff said Saadiq's original, austere approach to 1970s soul music compensated for his relatively dull singing voice, while Los Angeles Times reviewer Marc Weingarten regarded Instant Vintage as an overly modest, "long, tastefully arranged quiet storm" record. Ken Tucker was more critical in Entertainment Weekly, finding the music seductive but lacking spontaneity and burdened by "self-congratulatory lyrics" about Saadiq's musical talents and romantic faithfulness. "Saadiq's instructing us to admire him makes us think he doesn't have much else to say", Tucker said.

Instant Vintage earned Saadiq a 2003 Grammy Award nomination for Best R&B Album, while "Be Here" was nominated in the categories of Best R&B Song and Best Urban/Alternative Performance. Despite the nominations, Brown believed the record was "ignored by American critics infatuated with the minimal, mechanical sounds of the Neptunes and Timbaland" popular at the time. In 2009, Rhapsody ranked it at number 10 on the website's "Best R&B Albums of the Decade" list.

== Track listing ==
Instant Vintage track listing
No.	Title	Writer(s)	Length
1.	"Doing What I Can"	Raphael Saadiq, Glenn Standridge, Bobby Ozuna	4:19
2.	"Body Parts"	Raphael Saadiq, Glenn Standridge, Bobby Ozuna	3:49
3.	"Be Here" (featuring D'Angelo)	Raphael Saadiq, Glenn Standridge, Bobby Ozuna, Michael Archer	3:48
4.	"Still Ray"	Raphael Saadiq, Glenn Standridge, Bobby Ozuna, Kelvin Wooten	3:03
5.	"Oph"	Raphael Saadiq, Shyronda Felder, Kimberly A. Clausell, John T. Smith	2:34
6.	"You're the One That I Like"	Raphael Saadiq, Glenn Standridge, Bobby Ozuna	3:13
7.	"Excuse Me" (featuring Angie Stone and Calvin Richardson)	Raphael Saadiq, Glenn Standridge, Bobby Ozuna, Angie Stone, Calvin Richardson	3:24
8.	"Charlie Ray"	Raphael Saadiq, Glenn Standridge, Bobby Ozuna	2:42
9.	"Different Times" (featuring T-Boz of TLC)	Raphael Saadiq, Tionne Watkins	5:01
10.	"Tick Tock"	Raphael Saadiq, Raymon Murray, Olivia Ewing	4:28
11.	"People"	Raphael Saadiq, Raymon Murray, Taura Jackson	4:26
12.	"Tek #1"	Raphael Saadiq, Tony Cottrell	0:31
13.	"Faithful"	Raphael Saadiq, Kelvin Wooten	4:05
14.	"Make My Day"	Raphael Saadiq, Glenn Standridge, Bobby Ozuna	1:39
15.	"Blind Man"	Raphael Saadiq, Glenn Standridge, Bobby Ozuna	4:36
16.	"Tek #2"	Raphael Saadiq, Tony Cottrell	2:10
17.	"Uptown"	Raphael Saadiq	5:07
18.	"What's Life Like"	Raphael Saadiq, Timothy Christian Riley	2:49
19.	"Skyy, Can You Feel Me"	Raphael Saadiq, Charity Smith, Alvie Wiggins	14:33

== Personnel ==
Credits for Instant Vintage are adapted from CD Universe.

- Raphael Saadiq – vocals, guitar, bass
- Kelvin Wooten – vocals, guitar, tuba, piano, organ, keyboards, drums, percussion
- Leslie Wilson – vocals
- Charles Veal – violin, strings
- The South Central Chamber Orchestra – strings
- Brandon Fields – tenor saxophone
- Greg Adams – trumpet
- Lee Thornburg – trumpet
- Nick Lane – trombone
- Marvin “Chanz” Parkman – keyboards
- Jake and the Phatman – drums, percussion, scratches
- Battlecat – drums
- Randall Wiggins – background vocals
- Traci Nelson – background vocals
- Gerry Brown – audio mixer
- Glenn Standridge – audio mixer
- Daniel Romero – audio mixer
- Tony Maserati – audio mixer
- D'Angelo – vocals
- Angie Stone – vocals
- Calvin Richardson – vocals
- T-Boz – vocals
- Ray Murray – vocals

== Charts ==
Chart performance for Instant Vintage
Chart (2002)	Peak position
US Billboard 200	25
US Top R&B/Hip-Hop Albums (Billboard)	6
