= Tell Me 'bout It =

Single by Joss Stone

from the album Introducing Joss Stone
- B-side: "My God"
- Released: 6 February 2007
- Recorded: Compass Point Studios (Nassau, Bahamas)
- Genre: Neo soul; alternative hip hop; funk
- Length: 2:49
- Label: Relentless; Virgin
- Songwriter(s): Joss Stone; Raphael Saadiq; Robert C. Ozuna
- Producer(s): Raphael Saadiq

Joss Stone singles chronology
"Cry Baby Cry" (2006)	"Tell Me 'bout It" (2007)	"Tell Me What We're Gonna Do Now" (2007)

"Tell Me 'bout It" is a song by English singer and songwriter Joss Stone from her third studio album, Introducing Joss Stone (2007). It was written by Stone, Raphael Saadiq and Robert Ozuna (half of the duo Jake and the Phatman), and produced by Saadiq. The song was released in March 2007 as the album's lead single.

== Music video ==
Stone in the hip hop-themed video for "Tell Me 'bout It"

The music video for "Tell Me 'bout It" was directed by Bryan Barber and filmed on location at 5 Pointz, an industrial building used as a graffiti space located in Queens, New York City. In December 2006, the place's owner, graffiti artist Jonathan "Meres" Cohen, received a phone call from a representative for Stone, asking him to use 5 Pointz as the backdrop for the single's video. He was initially unaware of who Stone was, but he eventually gave permission to her crew after speaking to her. Cohen would later be in charge of Stone's body painting for the cover art and the photo shoot of Introducing Joss Stone.

Accompanying its setting, the video is noted for its hip hop-related elements such as graffiti and breakdancers. It features cameo appearances by Saadiq, who appears at the beginning playing the bass, and Cohen, who is shown at the end doing a mural of Stone's face, reminiscent of her face on the cover of her album Mind Body & Soul (2004).

== Chart performance ==
The single debuted at number 80 on the UK Singles Chart on 24 February 2007, it fell to number 92 the second week, two weeks later it went to its peak of 28, having spent six weeks on the Top 100. Having previously topped the US Bubbling Under Hot 100 Singles chart, "Tell Me 'bout It" debuted on the Billboard Hot 100 at number 83 in late March, becoming Stone's first solo single to enter the chart.

== Use in media ==
The song was used in the second episode of the first season of The CW's series Gossip Girl, titled "The Wild Brunch", which originally aired on 25 September 2007. It was also used in the soundtrack to the 2007 EA Sports video game NBA Live 08, and Saints Row 2.

== Track listings ==
UK and German CD single

1. "Tell Me 'bout It" – 2:53
2. "My God" – 3:48

Digital download – A Yam Who? Rework

1. "Tell Me 'bout It" (A Yam Who? Rework) – 4:21
2. "Tell Me 'bout It" (A Yam Who? Club Rework) – 9:38

== Credits and personnel ==
Credits adapted from the liner notes of Introducing Joss Stone.

- Joss Stone – lead vocals, songwriting
- Chalmers "Spanky" Alford – guitar
- Oswald Bowe – assistant engineering
- Chuck Brungardt – mixing, recording
- Tom Coyne – mastering
- Reggie Dozier – horn recording, string recording
- Joi Gilliam – backing vocals
- Keisha Jackson – backing vocals
- Jeremy Mackenzie – Pro Tools operator
- Marlon Marcel – assistant engineering
- Robert Ozuna – drums, turntablism, songwriting
- Khari Parker – additional drums
- Jermaine Paul – backing vocals
- Raphael Saadiq – bass, guitar, horn arrangements, production, songwriting
- Glenn Standridge – mixing, recording
- Charlie Stavish – assistant engineering
- Neil Symonette – percussion
- James Tanksley – assistant engineering
- John Tanksley – assistant engineering
- Benjamin Wright – string arrangements

== Charts ==
=== Weekly charts ===
Chart (2007)	Peak position
Austria (Ö3 Austria Top 40)	60
Belgium (Ultratip Bubbling Under Flanders)	2
Belgium (Ultratip Bubbling Under Wallonia)	17
Europe (European Hot 100 Singles)	46
Germany (GfK)	64
Greece (IFPI)	29
Hungary (Single Top 40)	10
Italy (FIMI)	12
Netherlands (Dutch Top 40)	8
Netherlands (Single Top 100)	5
Scotland (OCC)	18
Switzerland (Schweizer Hitparade)	33
UK Singles (OCC)	28
UK Hip Hop/R&B (OCC)	6
US Billboard Hot 100	83
US Adult Alternative Songs (Billboard)	5
US Pop 100 (Billboard)	73

=== Year-end charts ===
Chart (2007)	Position
Brazil (Crowley)	96
Netherlands (Dutch Top 40)	73
Netherlands (Single Top 100)	42
