= Tell Me What We're Gonna Do Now =

2007 single by Joss Stone

Single by Joss Stone featuring Common

from the album Introducing Joss Stone
- Released: 11 June 2007
- Studio: Compass Point (Nassau, Bahamas)
- Genre: Neo soul; alternative hip hop
- Length: 4:22 (album version); 3:59 (radio edit); 3:40 (no rap edit)
- Label: Relentless; Virgin
- Songwriter(s): Joss Stone; Alonzo "Novel" Stevenson; Tony Reyes; Lonnie Lynn; Mark Batson
- Producer(s): Raphael Saadiq

Joss Stone singles chronology
"Tell Me 'bout It" (2007)	"Tell Me What We're Gonna Do Now" (2007)	"L-O-V-E" (2007)

Common singles chronology
"The Game" (2007)	"Tell Me What We're Gonna Do Now" (2007)	"Drivin' Me Wild" (2007)

"Tell Me What We're Gonna Do Now" is a song by English singer and songwriter Joss Stone featuring American rapper Common. Written by Stone, Alonzo "Novel" Stevenson, Tony Reyes, Mark Batson and Common and produced by Raphael Saadiq, the song was released as the second single from Stone's third album Introducing Joss Stone in July 2007. It was later included on the 2011 compilation album The Best of Joss Stone 2003–2009.

== Chart performance ==
"Tell Me What We're Gonna Do Now" had a lacklustre performance in the United Kingdom, where it peaked at number eighty-four on the UK Singles Chart the week of 4 August 2007 and spent only one week on the tally, becoming Stone's first solo single to miss the UK top seventy-five. It charted mildly in other countries such as Canada, Germany, Romania and Switzerland. Nevertheless, the single did manage to achieve success in Turkey and the Netherlands, where it peaked at numbers four and twenty-three, respectively. It was also Stone's second single (the first being 2005's "Spoiled") to chart on the U.S. Hot R&B/Hip-Hop Songs, on which it debuted at number sixty-nine the week of 28 April 2007 (after debuting at number twelve on the Bubbling Under R&B/Hip-Hop Singles) and reached its peak position of number sixty-four four weeks later. Surprisingly, "Tell Me What We're Gonna Do Now" debuted at number thirty-eight in Greece the week of 23 February 2008, peaking at number thirty-two the following week.

== Music video ==
Stone lying on a flower-covered floor in the video.

The music video for "Tell Me What We're Gonna Do Now", directed by Sanaa Hamri and filmed in New York City, premiered on VH1 Soul on 7 May 2007 and on VH1's VSpot Top 20 Countdown, and has also been viewed on YouTube over 24 million times (as of 15 October 2010) on 12 May. In aid of U2's frontman Bono's initiative Product Red, an organization helping finance the fight of HIV/AIDS in Africa, 100% of the proceeds from copies of the video sold on iTunes were reverted to the Global Fund to Fight AIDS, Tuberculosis and Malaria; Stone is the first artist to do so.

The video starts with a red gerbera being held by the cameraman, who heads for a typical New York City terraced house from which Stone shows up. He hands the gerbera in to her and proceeds to film Stone as the two go for a walk around the city. Next, they take a break and sit on a bench in the city centre, where the cameraman caresses Stone's face and hands a drink plastic glass in to her. They then head for the backstage of Stone's outdoor concert in a park; she gets changed in an impromptu dressing room and subsequently comes onto the stage (where a Product Red billboard can be seen in the background) along with Common before a crowded audience. Common performs his rap segment followed by the song's final lines. As the concert ends, Stone takes the cameraman to the backstage where she kisses the camera as if she had kissed the man. Intercut shots of Stone wearing a skin-coloured suit and purple high heels while lying on a flower-covered floor are included from the scene in which Stone and the cameraman are sitting on the bench.

== Track listings ==
CD maxi single

1. "Tell Me What We're Gonna Do Now" (Album Version featuring Common) – 4:22
2. "Tell Me 'bout It" (Live from the Bowery Ballroom) – 5:20
3. "What Were We Thinking" (Live from the Bowery Ballroom) – 5:25

UK CD single

1. "Tell Me What We're Gonna Do Now" (Album Version featuring Common) – 4:22
2. "Music" (Live from the Bowery Ballroom) – 4:20

US promo CD single

1. "Tell Me What We're Gonna Do Now" (Radio Edit, No Rap) – 3:40
2. "Tell Me What We're Gonna Do Now" (Radio Edit featuring Common) – 3:58
3. "Tell Me What We're Gonna Do Now" (Instrumental) – 4:23

== Personnel ==
=== Musicians ===
- Joss Stone – vocals
- Common – vocals
- Raphael Saadiq – bass
- Khari Parker – drums
- Robert Ozuna – additional drums, percussion, turntablism
- Chalmers "Spanky" Alford – guitar
- Lionel Holoman – organ
- Charlie Happiness – claves

=== Production ===
- Raphael Saadiq – producer
- Glenn Standridge – mixing
- Chuck Brungardt – mixing
- Oswald Bowe – assistant engineer
- John Tanksley – assistant engineer
- James Tanksley – assistant engineer
- Marlon Marcel – assistant engineer
- Charlie Stavish – assistant engineer
- Jeremy Mackenzie – Pro Tools operator
- Benjamin Wright – string arrangements

== Charts ==
=== Weekly charts ===
Chart (2007–2008)	Peak position
Belgium (Ultratip Bubbling Under Flanders)	14
Canada (Canadian Hot 100)	53
Canada AC (Billboard)	37
Canada Hot AC (Billboard)	25
Germany (GfK)	96
Greece (IFPI)	32
Netherlands (Dutch Top 40)	23
Netherlands (Single Top 100)	37
Scotland (OCC)	46
Switzerland (Schweizer Hitparade)	66
UK Singles (OCC)	84
UK Hip Hop/R&B (OCC)	7
US Hot R&B/Hip-Hop Songs (Billboard)	64

=== Year-end charts ===
Chart (2007)	Position
Brazil (Crowley)	89
