= Dan Mackenzie =

American songwriter-producer

Dan Mackenzie is an American songwriter-producer.

Dan Mackenzie was the composer for the Discovery Channel/Original Production’s Monster House (U.S. TV series), nominated for a Primetime Emmy Award for Outstanding Main Title Theme Music in 2004. That same year he was the winner of The ASCAP Foundation Sammy Cahn Lyricist Award.

In 2007 Mackenzie wrote and produced a Christmas single for Joss Stone entitled “All I Want For Christmas” (Virgin Records/EMI). In 2008 he co-wrote and co-produced the song “Girlfriend on Demand” with Stone for her album Colour Me Free! (Virgin Records/EMI), released October 2009. Another song co-written by Joss Stone and Dan Mackenzie, "I Get High," was released on the Japanese edition only of the album.

Mackenzie's kindie-pop album "Dan Dan Doodlebug" won the Just Plain Folks Music Organization 2009 Award for "Best Children's Album." That year he also composed the original score music for actor Joe Pantoliano's 2009 documentary "No Kidding, Me Too," a film dedicated to removing the stigma from mental illness.

In 2010, Mackenzie received The ASCAP Foundation Joe Raposo Children's Music Award, which supports emerging talent in the area of children's music. That same year, Mackenzie collaborated with Martin Sexton to write songs for Sexton's 9th album, "Sugarcoating" (Kitchen Table Records).

On March 27, 2011, Mackenzie performed at the Kennedy Center in Washington, D.C., as part of the ASCAP Foundation's Songwriters: The Next Generation showcase.

Mackenzie wrote three of the songs featured in the 2013 television film musical Dear Dumb Diary (film), produced by Jerry Zucker and directed by Kristin Hanggi. He also produced six of the musical numbers for the film. In 2015, he collaborated with Hanggi again to write and produce the song "Stranded" for the 2015 film Naomi and Ely's No Kiss List, and also performed the song in the movie.

In 2018, Mackenzie wrote three songs (All Signs Point to Yes, Foolish Heart, and Greater Good) for the film musical Basmati Blues, starring Brie Larson, Utkarsh Ambudkar, Donald Sutherland, Tyne Daly, and Scott Bakula.
