= Jake and the Phatman =

American music duo

Jake & the Phatman
- Also known as: J & the Phatman
- Origin: California, United States
- Genres: Hip hop; R&B
- Members: Glenn Standridge; Bobby Ozuna

Jake & the Phatman is an American record production and songwriting duo, composed of multi-instrumentalists Glenn Standridge and Robert C. "Bobby" Ozuna Jr. They frequently work in tandem with American singer Raphael Saadiq, with or for whom they often produce songs. From three nominations, the duo won a Grammy Award for Best R&B Song at the 45th Annual Grammy Awards for their work on Erykah Badu's 2002 single "Love of My Life (An Ode to Hip-Hop)".

Both members were born and raised in the 1970s, in the San Francisco Bay Area. Their earlier credits include releases for California-based artists Luniz, 3X Krazy, Keak da Sneak, Dawn Robinson of En Vogue, and Dr. Dre. In 1997, they began work on what was to become the supergroup Lucy Pearl's debut album; the group was composed of Saadiq, Robinson, and Ali Shaheed of A Tribe Called Quest. It was during this time they developed their working relationship with Saadiq; their production on his debut album Instant Vintage (2002) included pressing the vocals onto acetate, then "scratching them into the tracks".

The duo have since produced for other acts in R&B and hip hop including Kelis, Mary J. Blige, TLC, Musiq Soulchild, Anthony Hamilton, Ginuwine, Dwele, Angie Stone, Common and John Legend.

== Awards and nominations ==
Year	Nominee / work	Award	Result	Ref.
2002	"Love of My Life (An Ode to Hip-Hop)"	Grammy Award for Best R&B Song	Won	
2002	"Be Here"	Grammy Award for Best R&B Song	Nominated	
2002	"Love of My Life (An Ode to Hip-Hop)"	Grammy Award for Best Song Written for a Motion Picture, Television or Other Visual Media	Nominated	
