= Mind Body & Soul Sessions: Live in New York City =

Video by Joss Stone
- Released: 13 December 2004
- Recorded: 24 April – 9 September 2004
- Venue: Irving Plaza (New York City, New York); La Zona Rosa (Austin, Texas); House of Blues (New Orleans, Louisiana)
- Genre: Soul; R&B
- Length: 115 minutes
- Label: S-Curve
- Director: Russell Thomas
- Producer: Heidi Kelso; Michael Mangini; Annette Mitchell; Chuck Mitchell; Betty Wright

Joss Stone chronology
Mind Body & Soul (2004)	Mind Body & Soul Sessions: Live in New York City (2004)	Introducing Joss Stone (2007)

Mind Body & Soul Sessions: Live in New York City is the first video album by English singer and songwriter Joss Stone, released on DVD on 13 December 2004 by S-Curve Records. It was filmed during Stone's sold-out concert at New York City's Irving Plaza on 9 September 2004, with additional live vocals from performances at La Zona Rosa in Austin, Texas, on 24 April 2004 and at the House of Blues in New Orleans on 27 April 2004. The DVD includes songs from her first two studio albums, The Soul Sessions (2003) and Mind Body & Soul (2004).

== Track listing ==
1. "Super Duper Love (Are You Diggin' on Me?)"
2. "Jet Lag"
3. "Don't Know How"
4. "The Chokin' Kind"
5. "You Had Me"
6. "Spoiled"
7. "Don't Cha Wanna Ride"
8. "Victim of a Foolish Heart"
9. "Less Is More"
10. "Right to Be Wrong"
11. "Fell in Love with a Boy"
12. "Some Kind of Wonderful"
13. "Dirty Man" (acoustic)

=== DVD bonus features ===
- Music videos:
  - "Fell in Love with a Boy"
    - Directed by Nzingha Stewart
    - Produced by John Winter
  - "Super Duper Love"
    - Directed by David LaChapelle
    - Executive produced by Rebecca Skinner
    - Produced by Fred Torres
  - "You Had Me"
    - Directed by Chris Robinson
    - Produced by Jill Hardin
- "Joss on the Road 2004" – never-before-seen mini-documentary filmed while travelling throughout the US and Europe
  - Produced by Smith and Watson Productions
  - Executive produced by Wendy Stoker
  - Filmed by Paul Conroy and Chris Watson (Smith and Watson Productions)
  - Sound by Paul Conroy and Wendy Stoker
  - Directed by Wendy Stoker and Chris Watson (Smith and Watson Productions)
  - Edited by Wendy Stoker and Chris Watson (Smith and Watson Productions) at The Gothic House, Totnes, Devon, England
- Out-takes from the filming of Mind Body & Soul Sessions: Live in New York City

== Personnel ==
Credits adapted from the liner notes of Mind Body & Soul Sessions: Live in New York City.

- Joss Stone – vocals
- Raymond Angry – keyboards, vocals
- Done and Dusted – concert film producer
- Rachel French – line producer
- David Gilmore – guitar
- David Goldman – cover photography
- David Gorman – art direction, design
- Steve Greenberg – executive producer
- Steve Greenwell – engineering, mixing
- Caesar Griffin – drums
- Sasha Harford – make-up artist
- John Harris – engineering
- Brian Hendry – monitor engineering
- Ryan Huddleston – backline technician
- Pete Iannacone – bass
- Julie Jakobek – executive producer
- Hardi Kamsani – assistant
- Heidi Kelso – production
- Ellison Kendrick – backing vocals
- Bryan Leitch – lighting designer
- Artia Lockett – backing vocals
- Brian Magallones – hairdresser
- Marty Maidenberg – executive producer
- Michael Mangini – mixing, production
- Scott McClintock – assistant
- Michael McConnell – tour manager
- Steve McGuire – FOH engineering
- Annette Mitchell – production
- Chuck Mitchell – production
- Arthur Nakata – art direction, design
- Abel Pabon – keyboards
- Tom Perme – backline technician
- Brian Russell – mixing assistance
- Paul D. Spriggs – tour and production coordinator
- Ron Stone – manager
- Russell Thomas – director
- David Tockman – legal
- Amy Touma – creative management, marketing
- Antonia Williams – backing vocals
- Betty Wright – production
- Ken Wright – assistant

== Charts ==
=== Weekly charts ===
Chart (2005)	Peak position
Austrian Music DVD (Ö3 Austria)	8
Dutch Music DVD (MegaCharts)	4
Greek Music DVD (IFPI)	12
Portuguese Music DVD (AFP)	10
UK Music Videos (OCC)	30

=== Year-end charts ===
Chart (2005)	Position
Dutch Music DVD (MegaCharts)	38

== Release history ==
Region	Date	Label	Ref.
Australia	13 December 2004	EMI	
Germany	13 December 2004	EMI	
Netherlands	13 December 2004	EMI	
United Kingdom	13 December 2004	Relentless	
Canada	14 December 2004	EMI	
France	14 December 2004	EMI	
United States	14 December 2004	S-Curve	
Japan	9 February 2005	EMI	
