= The Best of Joss Stone 2003–2009 =

2011 greatest hits album by Joss Stone

Greatest hits album by Joss Stone
- Released: 23 September 2011
- Recorded: 2003–2009
- Genre: Soul; R&B
- Length: 51:09
- Label: Virgin
- Producer: Steve Greenberg; Jamie Hartman; Michael Mangini; Conner Reeves; Raphael Saadiq; Jonathan Shorten; Sacha Skarbek; Joss Stone; Ahmir "Questlove" Thompson; Betty Wright

Joss Stone chronology
LP1 (2011)	The Best of Joss Stone 2003–2009 (2011)	The Soul Sessions Vol. 2 (2012)

The Best of Joss Stone 2003–2009 is the first greatest hits album by English singer and songwriter Joss Stone, released on 23 September 2011 by Virgin Records. Initially announced under the title Super Duper Hits: The Best of Joss Stone, the compilation contains songs from all of Stone's studio albums released under EMI: The Soul Sessions (2003), Mind Body & Soul (2004), Introducing Joss Stone (2007) and Colour Me Free! (2009).

Stone expressed her reluctance towards the album's release in an August 2011 interview with the San Francisco Examiner, stating, "They [EMI] are not allowed to do that—I do have a say, and I have to approve all the songs that they use, all the artwork, and especially the title. And oh my God, I've never heard such a cheesy title in all my life! And I don't know what kind of hits they're gonna put on there, because I've never had any hits!"

== Critical reception ==
Professional ratings
Review scores
Source	Rating
AllMusic	3.5/5 stars
PopMatters	5/10

AllMusic critic Stephen Thomas Erlewine stated, "If this doesn't dig deep, it nevertheless hits all the highlights [...] drawing a picture of the decade when Stone was always on the cusp of stardom yet never quite truly there. As introductions go, it's a solid one, capturing her potential and promise, alternating between singles frustrating and fun."

In a mixed review, Victor Valdivia of PopMatters noted that the album has "all of the songs she's most known for assembled in a package that's meant to cement her status as a major artist. What the collection actually does, however, is underline the contradictions that have always made Stone's work so difficult to embrace. Stone has a fine voice but she doesn't seem to actually live or feel her songs. She just sings them with uncanny technical precision."

== Track listing ==
The Best of Joss Stone 2003–2009 track listing
No.	Title	Writer(s)	Producer(s)	Length
1.	"Fell in Love with a Boy"	Jack White	Ahmir "Questlove" Thompson; Betty Wright; Steve Greenberg; Michael Mangini	3:38
2.	"Super Duper Love"	Willie Garner	Wright; Greenberg; Mangini	4:20
3.	"You Had Me"	Joss Stone; Francis White; Wendy Stoker; Wright	Mangini; Greenberg; Wright	3:59
4.	"Right to Be Wrong"	Stone; Desmond Child; Wright	Mangini; Greenberg; Wright	4:40
5.	"Don't Cha Wanna Ride"	Stone; Child; Wright; Greenberg; Mangini; Eugene Record; William Sanders	Mangini; Greenberg; Wright	3:31
6.	"Spoiled"	Stone; Lamont Dozier; Beau Dozier	Mangini; Greenberg; Wright	4:03
7.	"Tell Me 'bout It"	Stone; Raphael Saadiq; Robert Ozuna	Saadiq	2:48
8.	"Baby Baby Baby"	Stone; Danny P; Jonathan Shorten	Saadiq	4:34
9.	"Tell Me What We're Gonna Do Now" (featuring Common)	Stone; Alonzo "Novel" Stevenson; Tony Reyes; Lonnie Lynn	Saadiq	4:22
10.	"Bruised but Not Broken"	Diane Warren	Saadiq	4:15
11.	"L-O-V-E"	Bert Kaempfert; Milt Gabler	Saadiq	2:48
12.	"Free Me"	Stone; Shorten; Conner Reeves; Kenya Baker	Stone; Shorten; Reeves	3:53
13.	"Stalemate" (with Jamie Hartman)	Hartman; Camilla Boler; Stone	Sacha Skarbek; Hartman	4:18

== Charts ==
2011 chart performance for The Best of Joss Stone 2003–2009
Chart (2011)	Peak position
Argentine Albums (CAPIF)	8
Austrian Albums (Ö3 Austria)	58
Belgian Heatseekers Albums (Ultratop Flanders)	4
Belgian Heatseekers Albums (Ultratop Wallonia)	8
Italian Albums (FIMI)	98
Swiss Albums (Schweizer Hitparade)	57

2021 chart performance for The Best of Joss Stone 2003–2009
Chart (2021)	Peak position
UK Album Downloads (OCC)	55
UK R&B Albums (OCC)	12

== Release history ==
Release dates and formats for The Best of Joss Stone 2003–2009
Region	Date	Format	Label	Ref(s)
Australia	23 September 2011	CD	EMI	
Poland	26 September 2011	CD	EMI	
Australia	30 September 2011	Digital download	EMI	
Germany	30 September 2011	CD; digital download	EMI	
France	3 October 2011	CD; digital download	EMI	
United Kingdom	3 October 2011	CD; digital download	Virgin	
Italy	4 October 2011	CD; digital download	EMI	
United States	4 October 2011	CD; digital download	S-Curve	
Japan	12 October 2011	CD	EMI	
