= Spoiled (song) =

2005 single by Joss Stone

Single by Joss Stone

from the album Mind Body & Soul
- Released: 14 March 2005
- Studio: Chung King; Mojo; Right Track Recording (New York City)
- Length: 4:03 (album version); 3:33 (radio edit)
- Label: Relentless; Virgin; S-Curve
- Songwriters: Joss Stone; Lamont Dozier; Beau Dozier
- Producers: Michael Mangini; Steve Greenberg; Betty Wright

Joss Stone singles chronology
"Right to Be Wrong" (2004)	"Spoiled" (2005)	"Don't Cha Wanna Ride" (2005)

"Spoiled" is a song by English singer-songwriter Joss Stone from her second studio album, Mind Body & Soul (2004). Written by Stone, Lamont Dozier, and Beau Dozier and released in March 2005 as the album's third single, "Spoiled" peaked at number 32 on the UK Singles Chart, becoming the album's lowest-charting single in the UK. It was later included on the 2011 compilation album The Best of Joss Stone 2003–2009.

== Music video ==
Stone in the "Spoiled" music video

The music video for "Spoiled", directed by Joseph Kahn, was filmed on location at the West Taghkanic Diner, a roadside diner located at the junctions of the Taconic Parkway and Route 82 in West Taghkanic, New York, in February 2005. It opens with Stone and her boyfriend (played by model James Guardino) arriving at the diner at night in different cars. After getting out of their cars, the couple starts to have an argument. After a while, they go inside the diner and sit at a table. In an attempt to cheer Stone up, the boyfriend shows her a teddy bear. Stone tries to take it from his hand and he pulls it back, but eventually gives it back to her. Stone takes the teddy bear, leaves the diner and gets in her car. The boyfriend runs after her attempting to stop her, but as it was hopeless, he gets in his car and follows her on the road. After a few seconds driving, they see a light coming towards their direction, and the two subsequently crash into each other's car. Following the crash, Stone and her boyfriend are thrown from their respective cars in slow motion as they float in the air with tiny pieces of glass around them. The scene then goes backwards as if the accident had not happened, and they head for the diner in their cars, exactly like the video's beginning.

== Chart performance ==
"Spoiled" debuted and peaked at number 32 on the UK Singles Chart the week of 19 March 2005, spending two weeks on the chart and becoming Mind, Body & Soul's lowest-charting single.

== Track listings ==
UK CD single

1. "Spoiled" – 4:02
2. "Right to Be Wrong" (live in New York City) – 3:23

UK DVD single

1. "Spoiled" (video) – 4:00
2. "The Chokin' Kind" (live video in New York City) – 4:45
3. "Fell in Love with a Boy" (live audio in New York City) – 4:14

European CD single

1. "Spoiled" – 4:02
2. "The Chokin' Kind" (onstage at Irving Plaza) – 3:42

European maxi-CD single

1. "Spoiled" – 4:02
2. "Don't Know How" (onstage at Irving Plaza) – 5:15
3. "Less Is More" (onstage at Irving Plaza) – 5:03

== Personnel ==
Musicians

- Joss Stone – lead vocals, backing vocals
- David "Jody" Hill – drums
- Angelo Morris – bass
- Willie "Little Beaver" Hale – guitar
- Timmy Thomas – Hammond organ
- Benny Latimore – piano
- Betty Wright – backing vocals

Production

- Michael Mangini – producer, mixing, programming
- Steve Greenberg – producer
- Betty Wright – producer
- Steve Greenwell – engineer, mixing, programming
- Thom Bell – string arrangements, horn arrangements

== Charts ==
Chart (2005)	Peak position
Belgium (Ultratip Bubbling Under Flanders)	6
Belgium (Ultratip Bubbling Under Wallonia)	17
Netherlands (Dutch Top 40)	24
Netherlands (Single Top 100)	46
Scottish Singles Sales (Official Charts)	39
UK Singles (Official Charts)	32
UK Hip Hop/R&B (Official Charts)	10
US Hot R&B/Hip-Hop Songs (Billboard)	54

== Release history ==
Region	Date	Format	Label(s)	Ref(s).
United Kingdom	14 March 2005	CD single	Relentless; Virgin	
United Kingdom	14 March 2005	DVD single	Relentless; Virgin	
Germany	21 March 2005	CD single	S-Curve	
Austria	21 March 2005	CD single	S-Curve	
Switzerland	21 March 2005	CD single	S-Curve	
