= Don't Cha Wanna Ride =

2005 single by Joss Stone

Single by Joss Stone

from the album Mind Body & Soul
- B-side: "The Right Time"
- Released: 4 July 2005
- Studio: Mojo (New York City, New York)
- Genre: Soul
- Length: 3:31
- Label: Relentless; S-Curve; Virgin
- Songwriters: Joss Stone; Desmond Child; Betty Wright; Steve Greenberg; Michael Mangini; Eugene Record; William Sanders
- Producers: Michael Mangini; Steve Greenberg; Betty Wright

Joss Stone singles chronology
| "Spoiled" (2005) | "Don't Cha Wanna Ride" (2005) | "Cry Baby Cry" (2006) |

"Don't Cha Wanna Ride" is a song by English singer and songwriter Joss Stone from her second studio album, Mind Body & Soul (2004). The track was written by Stone, Desmond Child, Betty Wright, Steve Greenberg, and Michael Mangini and is based upon a sample from the 1968 song "Soulful Strut" by Chicago-based soul and jazz instrumental group Young-Holt Unlimited. The song was first serviced to US radio on 26 July 2004, then was issued physically in the United Kingdom on 4 July 2005 as the fourth and final single from the album. The song was later included on the 2011 compilation album The Best of Joss Stone 2003–2009.

== Critical reception ==
Caroline Sullivan of The Guardian wrote that on "Don't Cha Wanna Ride", Stone "works up a decent head of hands-in-the-air funk." Blender's Robert Christgau felt that the song "split the difference between guaranteed hook appeal and a decent simulation of emotional truth." Although calling it a "neo soul hip-shaker", Laura Sinagra of Rolling Stone considered the song to be "more Destiny's Child than yesterday's blues." David Browne of Entertainment Weekly stated that Mind, Body & Soul's "one attempt at sauciness, 'Don't Cha Wanna Ride,' in which Stone [...] compares herself to a juiced-up car, should be parked in the lingerie section of a department store."

== Chart performance ==
"Don't Cha Wanna Ride" debuted and peaked at number 20 on the UK Singles Chart the week of 16 July 2005, spending four weeks on the chart and becoming Mind, Body & Soul's second highest-charting single after "You Had Me". Internationally the single underperformed the charts in Germany and Switzerland, but proved to be somewhat successful in the Netherlands, where it reached number 24 (as did its predecessor, "Spoiled"), and Italy, where it reached number 38.

== Music video ==
The music video for "Don't Cha Wanna Ride", directed by Wayne Isham, was shot in Santa Monica, California, and released in June 2005. It features scenes of Stone driving a white, floral-print Volkswagen Beetle 1302 Cabriolet along the Pacific Coast Highway and performing with her band at the Santa Monica Pier at dusk.

== Track listings ==
UK CD single and 7-inch picture disc

1. "Don't Cha Wanna Ride" – 3:31
2. "The Right Time" – 3:50

UK DVD single

1. "Don't Cha Wanna Ride" (video) – 3:31
2. "Right to Be Wrong" (live at the 2005 Brit Awards) (video) – 4:30
3. "Spoiled" (on Stage at Irving Plaza) – 5:38

European CD single

1. "Don't Cha Wanna Ride" – 3:31
2. "Spoiled" (on Stage at Irving Plaza) – 5:38
3. "Fell in Love with a Boy" (on Stage at Irving Plaza) – 4:14

== Personnel ==
Musicians

- Joss Stone – lead vocals, backing vocals
- AJ Nilo – guitar
- Jonathan Joseph – drums
- Michael Mangini – bass, keyboards
- Raymond Angry – piano, Hammond organ
- Tom "Bones" Malone – baritone saxophone, tenor saxophone, trombone, trumpet
- Betty Wright – backing vocals
- Bombshell – backing vocals

Production

- Michael Mangini – producer, mixing, programming
- Steve Greenberg – producer
- Betty Wright – producer
- Steve Greenwell – engineer, mixing, programming

== Charts ==
| Chart (2005) | Peak position |
|---|---|
| Belgium (Ultratip Bubbling Under Flanders) | 10 |
| Germany (GfK) | 100 |
| Hungary (Editors' Choice Top 40) | 26 |
| Italy (FIMI) | 38 |
| Netherlands (Dutch Top 40) | 24 |
| Netherlands (Single Top 100) | 54 |
| Scotland Singles (OCC) | 21 |
| Switzerland (Schweizer Hitparade) | 93 |
| UK Singles (OCC) | 20 |

== Release history ==
| Region | Date | Format(s) | Label(s) | Ref. |
|---|---|---|---|---|
| United States | 26 July 2004 | Triple A radio | S-Curve | |
| United Kingdom | 4 July 2005 | CD single | Relentless; S-Curve; Virgin | |
| United Kingdom | 4 July 2005 | DVD single | Relentless; S-Curve; Virgin | |
| United Kingdom | 4 July 2005 | 7-inch single | Relentless; S-Curve; Virgin | |
| Germany | 22 August 2005 | CD single | S-Curve; Virgin | |
| Austria | 22 August 2005 | CD single | S-Curve; Virgin | |
| Switzerland | 22 August 2005 | CD single | S-Curve; Virgin | |
