= Super Duper Love (Are You Diggin' on Me) =

1974 song by Sugar Billy

Single by Sugar Billy

from the album Super Duper Love
- A-side: "Super Duper Love (Are You Diggin' on Me) – Part 1"
- B-side: "Super Duper Love (Are You Diggin' on Me) – Part 2"
- Released: 1974
- Genre: Soul; funk
- Length: 3:14 (Part 1); 2:11 (Part 2)
- Label: Fast Track
- Songwriter: Willie Garner
- Producer: Soundtrack Production

"Super Duper Love (Are You Diggin' on Me)" is a song by Willie "Sugar Billy" Garner, released in 1975 as a single from his 1975 album Super Duper Love. It interpolates parts of Aretha Franklin's 1968 version of Young Rascals' song "Groovin'". It was made famous when English singer Joss Stone covered the song's part one for her debut album, The Soul Sessions (2003), from which it was released in May 2004 as the second and final single under the title "Super Duper Love". A live performance of James Brown's 1966 song "It's a Man's Man's Man's World", retitled "It's a Man's Man's World", is included as a B-side to the CD single.

== Joss Stone version ==
"Super Duper Love"

Single by Joss Stone

from the album The Soul Sessions
- B-side: "It's a Man's Man's Man's World" (live)
- Released: May 10, 2004
- Recorded: April 9, 2003
- Studio: Hit Factory Criteria (Miami)
- Length: 4:20
- Label: Relentless; Virgin
- Songwriter: Willie Garner
- Producers: Betty Wright; Steve Greenberg; Michael Mangini

Joss Stone singles chronology
| "Fell in Love with a Boy" (2004) | "Super Duper Love" (2004) | "You Had Me" (2004) |

English singer Joss Stone covered "Super Duper Love" for her debut studio album, The Soul Sessions. The song was released as the album's second and final single on May 10, 2004. It was later included on her 2011 compilation album, The Best of Joss Stone 2003–2009.

=== Commercial performance ===
"Super Duper Love" debuted and peaked at number 18 on the UK Singles Chart. It also peaked at number seven on the UK R&B Singles Chart.

=== Track listings ===
- UK and European CD single
1. "Super Duper Love (Are You Diggin' on Me?) Pt. 1" (single mix) – 3:47
2. "It's a Man's Man's World" (live at Kennedy Center, Washington, D.C., December 7, 2003) – 3:35
- UK limited-edition 7-inch single

A. "Super Duper Love (Are You Diggin' on Me?) Pt. 1" (single mix) – 3:47
B. "It's a Man's Man's World" (live at Kennedy Center, Washington, D.C., December 7, 2003) – 3:35

=== Credits and personnel ===
Credits are lifted from the UK 7-inch single and The Soul Sessions booklet.

Studios

- Recorded on April 9, 2003, at The Hit Factory Criteria (Miami, Florida)
- Mastered at Sterling Sound (New York City)

Personnel

- Willie Garner – writing
- Joss Stone – lead vocals
- Betty Wright – backing vocals, production
- Jeanette Wright – backing vocals
- Namphuyo Aisha McCray – backing vocals
- Willie "Little Beaver" Hale – guitar
- Angelo Morris – guitar
- Jack Daley – bass
- Timmy Thomas – organ
- Benny Latimore – piano
- Cindy Blackman – drums
- Ignacio Nunez – percussion
- Mike Mangini – tambourine, production
- Steve Greenberg – production
- Steve Greenwell – engineering, mixing
- Chris Gehringer – mastering

=== Charts ===
| Chart (2004) | Peak position |
|---|---|
| Croatia (HRT) | 4 |
| Germany (GfK) | 78 |
| Scotland Singles (OCC) | 21 |
| UK Singles (OCC) | 18 |
| UK Hip Hop/R&B (OCC) | 7 |

=== Certifications ===
| Region | Certification | Certified units/sales |
|---|---|---|
| New Zealand (RMNZ) | Gold | 15,000^{‡} |
^{‡} Sales+streaming figures based on certification alone.

=== Use in media ===
The song was used in movies The Prince and Me and Bridget Jones: The Edge of Reason and also TV series Malcolm in the Middle, ER, The West Wing, Brothers & Sisters, Broad City and Love Island.
