= Bible Belt (album) =

Studio album by Diane Birch
- Released: May 19, 2009
- Genre: Soul, blues
- Length: 55:01
- Label: S-Curve
- Producer: Steve Greenberg, Betty Wright, Michael Mangini

Diane Birch chronology
Bible Belt (2009)	The Velveteen Age (2010)

Bible Belt is the debut studio album by soul singer-songwriter Diane Birch. Its lead single was "Nothing But a Miracle". An acoustic version of the song "Rewind" appears on a season 3 episode of The Vampire Diaries.

== Development ==
Birch developed her seventies-style pop music while visiting London and Los Angeles. She recorded Bible Belt in New Orleans and her hometown New York. Several of the songs are autobiographical, such as "Don't Wait Up" which deals with sneaking out from her parents house before changing into Goth dress. "Valentino" is dedicated to her imaginary friend, her muse, from her teenage period when she felt out of time and felt ties to the 18th century. Another song, "Fire Escape", grew out of conversation with a friend, when she learned that the friend's father had recently died. The album has sounds of earlier musical times, with the feel of Joni Mitchell, Carole King, Laura Nyro, and Carly Simon threaded throughout the 13 tracks. Birch employed an orchestra of violins, violas and cellos for "Fire Escape" and "Photograph", under the direction of concert master Sandy Park. She preferred the sound of the Wurlitzer piano because it has a "richness that's hard to replicate on a modern instrument".

== Reception ==
Professional ratings
Review scores
Source	Rating
AllMusic	3.5/5 stars
PopMatters	(6/10)
Rolling Stone	3.5/5 stars
Mojo	4/5 stars

In Mojo, Charles Waring described it as "a mighty impressive first album" and claimed she "combines strong vocal melodies with infectious hook lines and delivers them with a soulful fervour." He also compared her with Carole King, Laura Nyro and Phoebe Snow, while acknowledging "there are elements of gospel, doo wop, Americana and Motown ... Birch has got a great voice and the depth of feeling she injects into her performances imbues her songs with a genuine soulfulness. Solidly consistent, the set is packed with memorable moments, including "Fools", "Nothing But a Miracle" and "Mirror Mirror"."

== Track listing ==
All tracks are written by Diane Birch.

No.	Title	Length
1.	"Fire Escape"	4:01
2.	"Valentino"	2:49
3.	"Fools"	3:54
4.	"Nothing but a Miracle"	4:23
5.	"Rewind"	6:09
6.	"Rise Up"	4:31
7.	"Photograph"	5:21
8.	"Don't Wait Up"	3:00
9.	"Mirror Mirror"	4:48
10.	"Ariel"	3:56
11.	"Choo Choo"	3:42
12.	"Forgiveness"	5:08
13.	"Magic View"	3:10
Total length:		55:01

Japanese bonus Tracks
No.	Title	Length
14.	"Every Now and Again"	3:56
15.	"Cheap Ass Love"	2:39

== Personnel ==
Musicians

- Diane Birch: vocals, bells, Fender Rhodes piano, Farfisa organ, finger snaps, guitar, handclapping, keyboards, organ, piano, Wurlitzer electric piano, synthesizers, percussion
- Betty Wright, Cole Williams, Sumyia Dabney, Eugene Pitt, Bobby Jay, Jose Moro, Joel Katz, Michael Longoria: additional vocals and/or doo-wop vocals
- Lenny Kaye (primary), Fionn O'Lachlainn: electric guitar
- Anna Wayland: acoustic guitar
- Adam Blackstone, George Porter Jr.: bass guitar
- Cindy Blackman: drums
- Stanton Moore: drums, percussion
- Raymond Angry: organ
- Lou Marini, Lenny Pickett: saxophone
- Tom Malone: trombone, flugelhorn
- Jim Hines (primary), Frank London: trumpet
- Eugene Briskin, Sumire Kudo, Jeanne LeBlanc, Eileen Moon, Sophie Shao, Mary Wooten, Wei Hong Yu: cello
- Eva Burmeister, Tomas K. Carney, Minyoung Chang, Shan Jiang, Lisa Kim, Juan Cheng Lu, Karen Marx, Sarah O'Boyle, Suzanne Ornstein, Sandra Park, Annaliesa Place, Jenny Strenger, Arnaud Sussmann, Jung Sun Yoo, Alicia Svigals, Maxim Moston: violin
- David Creswell, Dawn Hannay, Vivek Kamath, Daniel Panner, Michael Roth: viola
- Shannon Powell: tambourine

Production

- Steve Greenberg: Executive producer, producer
- Betty Wright: producer
- Mike Manginin: producer, mixing
- Howie Beno: engineer, mixing
- Steve Greenwell: engineer, mixing
- Chris Gehringer: mastering
- Sheldon Steiger: engineer
- Tim Ives: photography

== Charts ==
Chart (2009)	Peak position
U.S. Billboard 200	87
Italian Albums Chart	26
UK Albums Chart	77

The track "Fools" was on the 2009 year-end list for Billboard's Japanese Adult Contemporary chart at number 60.
