= Speak a Little Louder =

Studio album by Diane Birch
- Released: October 15, 2013
- Genre: Rock, synth-pop
- Length: 45:32
- Label: S-Curve
- Producer: Diane Birch, Steve Greenberg, Matt Hales, Homer Steinweiss, Ahmir Thompson, Eg White, Sheldon Steiger

Diane Birch chronology
| The Velveteen Age (2010) | Speak a Little Louder (2013) | Nous (2016) |

Professional ratings
Review scores
| Source | Rating |
|---|---|
| AllMusic | 3.5/5 stars |
| New York Daily News | 3/5 stars |
| PopMatters | 6/10 |
| Rolling Stone | 3.0/5 stars |

Speak a Little Louder is the second studio album released by singer-songwriter Diane Birch. The lead single is "All the Love You Got". Birch's singing and composition evokes sounds of Stevie Nicks and Fleetwood Mac. Birch's father died of cancer earlier in 2013, and she wrote the album to make sense of her past. Birch stated "Going through losing somebody was a very spiritually transformative experience to me, so some of the songs [I had initially planned for Speak a Little Louder] didn't feel relevant. Hanging on to that facet of rebellion in my past became irrelevant."

Birch wrote or co-wrote all the tracks on the album. The primary musicians on the album consists of Diane Birch on vocals, piano, keyboard, and tambourine (plus organ, Rhodes, keg, and drums), Nick Movshon on bass, and Homer Steinweiss on drum and guitar (plus bass). Other musicians to support the album are guitarists Mike Barron, Bing Ji Ling, Thomas Brenneck, James Farkas, Luke O'Malley, Mark Williams, and Tomek Miernowski, Jean-Philip Grobler on guitar and synth, Eg White on guitar and keyboard, bass players Angelo Morris and John Taylor, and Ahmir "?uestlove" Thompson on drums. Matt "Aqualung" Hales performs all instruments on "UNFKD" and mostly all instruments on bonus song "Hold on a Little Longer".

== Track listing ==
- All songs produced by Homer Steinweiss, except where noted.

| No. | Title | Writer(s) | Producer | Length |
|---|---|---|---|---|
| 1. | "Speak a Little Louder" | Diane Birch, Homer Steinweiss | | 3:46 |
| 2. | "Lighthouse" | Birch, Steinweiss | | 3:55 |
| 3. | "All the Love You Got" | Birch, Eg White | White, Steve Greenberg, Ahmir "Questlove" Thompson | 3:52 |
| 4. | "Tell Me Tomorrow" | Birch, Steinweiss | | 3:43 |
| 5. | "Superstars" | Birch | | 4:51 |
| 6. | "Pretty in Pain" | Birch, Betty Wright | | 3:44 |
| 7. | "Love and War" | Birch, Cathy Dennis, Jimmy Harry | | 3:58 |
| 8. | "Frozen Over" | Birch | Steve Greenberg, Sheldon Steiger | 3:11 |
| 9. | "Diamonds in the Dust" | Birch, Barrett Yeretsian | | 4:35 |
| 10. | "UNFKD" | Birch, Matt "Aqualung" Hales | Matt Hales | 4:12 |
| 11. | "It Plays On" | Birch | Diane Birch | 5:45 |
| Total length: | | | | 45:32 |

Deluxe Edition bonus tracks
| No. | Title | Writer(s) | Producer | Length |
|---|---|---|---|---|
| 12. | "Walk the Rainbow to the End" | Birch | Diane Birch | 4:16 |
| 13. | "Adelaide" | Birch, Steinweiss | Homer Steinweiss | 4:07 |
| 14. | "Staring at You" | Birch, Steinweiss | Homer Steinweiss | 5:23 |
| 15. | "Hold on a Little Longer" | Birch | Matt Hales | 4:03 |
| 16. | "Truer than Blue" | Birch, Steinweiss | Homer Steinweiss | 4:00 |
| Total length: | | | | 1:07:22 |
