= Right to Be Wrong =

2004 single by Joss Stone

Single by Joss Stone

from the album Mind Body & Soul
- B-side: "Jet Lag" (live)
- Released: 29 November 2004
- Studio: Chung King, Mojo, Right Track Recording (New York City); The Hit Factory Criteria (Miami, Florida)
- Length: 4:40 (album version); 4:00 (radio edit)
- Label: Relentless; Virgin; S-Curve
- Songwriters: Joss Stone; Desmond Child; Betty Wright
- Producers: Michael Mangini; Steve Greenberg; Betty Wright

Joss Stone singles chronology
"You Had Me" (2004)	"Right to Be Wrong" (2004)	"Spoiled" (2005)

"Right to Be Wrong" is a song by English singer-songwriter Joss Stone from her second studio album, Mind Body & Soul (2004). Written by Stone, Desmond Child and Betty Wright, the track was released in the United Kingdom on 29 November 2004 as the album's second single. It peaked at number 29 on the UK Singles Chart, staying on the chart for six weeks. It was later included on the 2011 compilation album The Best of Joss Stone 2003–2009. The song was covered in Spanish by Mexican rock singer Alejandra Guzmán on her 2004 album Lipstick, retitled "Tengo Derecho a Estar Mal" (meaning "I've Got the Right to Be Wrong").

Stone performed a folk version of the song when she made a cameo appearance as herself in the third season of the American series American Dreams, in the episode "Starting Over", which aired on 30 January 2005.

== Critical reception ==
Entertainment Weekly's David Browne says that "Right to Be Wrong, [is] a weirdly defensive song given Stone's out-of-the-gate success". Yahoo! Music's Dan Gennoe called it "late night smoulder".

== Commercial performance ==
"Right to Be Wrong" debuted and peaked at number 29 on the UK Singles Chart. In United States, the song peaked at numbers 10 and 27 on the Billboard Triple-A Tracks and Adult Top 40 charts, respectively.

== Track listings ==
UK CD single

1. "Right to Be Wrong" – 4:39
2. "The Player" – 4:42
3. "Don't Know How" (live performance from AOL Sessions) – 5:27

UK 7-inch single and European CD single

1. "Right to Be Wrong" – 4:39
2. "Jet Lag" (acoustic live performance from AOL Sessions) – 4:21

== Personnel ==
Musicians

- Joss Stone – lead vocals, backing vocals
- Betty Wright – backing vocals
- Bombshell – backing vocals
- AJ Nilo – guitar
- Jack Daley – bass
- Cindy Blackman – drums
- Benny Latimore – piano
- Raymond Angry – Hammond organ
- Tom "Bones" Malone – flugelhorn
- Angelo Morris – Fender Rhodes

Production

- Michael Mangini – production, mixing
- Steve Greenberg – production
- Betty Wright – production
- Steve Greenwell – engineering, mixing

== Charts ==
=== Weekly charts ===
Chart (2004–2005)	Peak position
Australia (ARIA)	66
Belgium (Ultratip Bubbling Under Flanders)	2
Belgium (Ultratip Bubbling Under Wallonia)	16
Canada AC Top 30 (Radio & Records)	27
Italy (FIMI)	30
Scotland Singles (OCC)	33
Switzerland (Schweizer Hitparade)	46
UK Singles (OCC)	29
US Adult Alternative Airplay (Billboard)	10
US Adult Pop Airplay (Billboard)	27

=== Year-end charts ===
Chart (2005)	Position
US Adult Top 40 (Billboard)	84

== Release history ==
Region	Date	Format(s)	Label(s)	Ref.
United Kingdom	29 November 2004	CD	Relentless; Virgin; S-Curve	
United Kingdom	29 November 2004	7-inch vinyl	Relentless; Virgin; S-Curve	
United States	6 December 2004	Triple A radio	EMI; S-Curve	
United States	10 January 2005	Hot adult contemporary radio	EMI; S-Curve	
Australia	14 March 2005	CD	EMI; S-Curve	
