= Mind Body & Soul =

2004 studio album by Joss Stone

Studio album by Joss Stone
- Released: 15 September 2004
- Studio: Mojo (New York City) (Note: Tracks 1–5, 7 and 9–14); Chung King (New York City) (Note: Tracks 1–4, 7, 9, 10, 13 and 14); Right Track (New York City) (Note: Tracks 1, 3, 7, 11 and 14); The Hit Factory Criteria (Miami) (Note: Tracks 1, 4, 10, 12 and 13); The Headquarters (New Jersey) (Note: Track 6); Creative Space (Miami) (Note: Track 8)
- Genre: Soul; R&B; pop
- Length: 71:54
- Label: S-Curve
- Producer: The Boilerhouse Boys; Commissioner Gordon; Steve Greenberg; Mike Mangini; Danny P.; Conner Reeves; Salaam Remi; Jonathan Shorten; Betty Wright

Joss Stone chronology
The Soul Sessions (2003)	Mind Body & Soul (2004)	Mind Body & Soul Sessions: Live in New York City (2004)

Singles from Mind Body & Soul
- 1. "You Had Me" Released: 13 September 2004; 2. "Right to Be Wrong" Released: 29 November 2004; 3. "Spoiled" Released: 14 March 2005; 4. "Don't Cha Wanna Ride" Released: 4 July 2005

Mind Body & Soul is the second studio album by English singer and songwriter Joss Stone, released on 15 September 2004 by S-Curve Records. The album received generally favourable reviews from music critics and earned Stone three Grammy Award nominations, including Best New Artist and Best Pop Vocal Album.

Mind Body & Soul debuted at number one on the UK Albums Chart with 75,000 copies sold in its first week, making Stone the youngest female singer to top the chart. It also performed strongly on international record charts, reaching number 11 on the Billboard 200 in the United States and charting within the top 10 in several countries across Europe and Oceania.

== Critical reception ==
Professional ratings
Aggregate scores
Source	Rating
Metacritic	64/100
Review scores
Source	Rating
AllMusic	4/5 stars
Blender	3/5 stars
Entertainment Weekly	C
The Guardian	3/5 stars
Q	3/5 stars
Rolling Stone	3/5 stars
Vibe	3.5/5
Yahoo! Music	7/10 stars
USA Today	2.5/4 stars

Mind Body & Soul received generally positive reviews from music critics. At Metacritic, which assigns a normalised rating out of 100 to reviews from mainstream publications, the album received an average score of 64, based on 11 reviews. Stephen Thomas Erlewine from AllMusic noted that, compared to The Soul Sessions, "[c]ertain songs are a little brighter and a little more radio-ready than before, there's a more pronounced hip-hop vibe to some beats, and she sounds a little more like a diva this time around—not enough to alienate older fans, but enough to win some new ones. The album has a seductive, sultry feel; there's some genuine grit to the rhythms, yet it's all wrapped up in a production that's smooth as silk." John Murphy of musicOMH wrote that "[t]his is a terrific album, and on this basis Joss Stone is going to be a household name for years and years to come." Darryl Sterdan of Jam! wrote that "even if her contributions were limited to lyrics and melodies, she still comes through with flying colours, displaying a knack for sharp hooks and catchy choruses." Dan Gennoe of Yahoo! Music UK commented that songs like "Right to Be Wrong", "Jet Lag" and "Killing Time" "confirm that not only can she deliver pain and passion like a lover three times her age, she can write it like one too." He continued: "There's not a bad song here, but there are some that never make it out of the rootsy background."

Billboard critic Michael Paoletta stated that Stone "continues to reinvent soul music, injecting a very classic sound with contemporary sass and verve", while noting that "[t]hroughout, that voice reigns supreme." The Guardian's Caroline Sullivan believed that "this record is best seen as a stepping stone by which she shouldn't be judged too exactingly." She also praised Stone's "ripening" voice, saying it is "foxier" than on The Soul Sessions. At Blender magazine, Robert Christgau opined that "this album's compromise with the teen-pop divahood she was groomed for will feel like a bid for authenticity. Stone's infatuation with band grooves provides relief from the radio-ready synthesizers and compressors." Dimitri Ehrlich of Vibe called the album "deeply refreshing", adding that "[t]here's nothing new here [...] but if your ears are inured to the dense, overly polished production of contemporary R&B, Stone's simplicity and rawness will come as a revelation." Laura Sinagra of Rolling Stone wrote, "As on her last album, tasteful retro organs and wah-wah dominate this batch of originals" and named "Spoiled" one of the album's "strongest moments", but felt that songs like "Don't Cha Wanna Ride" and "You Had Me" are "more Destiny's Child than yesterday's blues". In a mixed review, David Browne of Entertainment Weekly stated, "Save for a mild foray into reggae and a stab at power balladry, the tracks are monotonously midtempo, supper-club soul."

=== Accolades ===
At the 2005 Brit Awards, Stone won the awards for British Female Solo Artist and British Urban Act, and was nominated for British Breakthrough Act, becoming the youngest recipient of a Brit Award at age 17. That same year, Stone received three nominations at the 47th Annual Grammy Awards, including Best New Artist, Best Female Pop Vocal Performance for "You Had Me" and Best Pop Vocal Album for Mind Body & Soul. The album earned Stone a nomination for International Newcomer of the Year at Germany's Echo Awards in 2005.

== Commercial performance ==
Mind Body & Soul entered the UK Albums Chart at number one with first-week sales of 75,000 copies, making Stone the youngest female singer to top the chart at 17 years and five months old, a record previously held by Avril Lavigne with her album Let Go (2002). The record was eventually broken by Billie Eilish in April 2019, when her album When We All Fall Asleep, Where Do We Go? debuted at number one on the UK Albums Chart while she was 17 years and three months old. It also became the first number-one album for Relentless Records. The album spent one week atop the UK Albums Chart, and was certified triple platinum by the British Phonographic Industry (BPI) on 9 September 2005. As of July 2012, Mind Body & Soul had sold 940,617 copies in the United Kingdom. The album debuted at number 11 on the Billboard 200 in the United States, selling 73,487 copies in its first week. It was certified platinum by the Recording Industry Association of America (RIAA) on 9 September 2005, and had sold 1.3 million copies in the US by July 2011.

Mind Body & Soul was successful in most European countries, peaking at number three on the European Top 100 Albums chart, while reaching the top five in Austria, Belgium, the Netherlands and Portugal, and the top 10 in France, Germany, Ireland, Norway and Switzerland. The International Federation of the Phonographic Industry (IFPI) certified the album platinum, denoting sales in excess of one million copies across Europe. In Oceania, the album reached number five in New Zealand and number seven in Australia, and has been certified gold by both the Australian Recording Industry Association (ARIA) and the Recording Industry Association of New Zealand (RIANZ).

== Track listing ==
No.	Title	Writer(s)	Producer(s)	Length
1.	"Right to Be Wrong"	Joss Stone; Desmond Child; Betty Wright	Mike Mangini; Steve Greenberg; Wright	4:40
2.	"Jet Lag"	Stone; Jonathan Shorten; Conner Reeves; Wright	Mangini; Greenberg; Wright; Shorten; Reeves	4:01
3.	"You Had Me"	Stone; Francis White; Wendy Stoker; Wright	Mangini; Greenberg; Wright	3:59
4.	"Spoiled"	Stone; Lamont Dozier; Beau Dozier	Mangini; Greenberg; Wright	4:03
5.	"Don't Cha Wanna Ride"	Stone; Child; Wright; Greenberg; Mangini; Eugene Record; William Sanders	Mangini; Greenberg; Wright	3:31
6.	"Less Is More"	Stone; Shorten; Reeves	Commissioner Gordon; Wright^{[a]}	4:17
7.	"Security"	Stone; Greenberg; Daniel Pierre	Mangini; Greenberg; Wright	4:30
8.	"Young at Heart"	Stone; Salaam Remi	Remi; Wright^{[a]}	4:10
9.	"Snakes and Ladders"	Stone; Shorten; Reeves	Mangini; Greenberg; Wright; Shorten; Reeves	3:35
10.	"Understand"	Stone; Wright; Angelo Morris; Mangini; Greenberg	Mangini; Greenberg; Wright	3:46
11.	"Don't Know How"	Pierre; Curtis Richardson; Jeremy Ruzumna; Justin Gray	Mangini; Greenberg; Wright; Danny P.	4:01
12.	"Torn and Tattered"	Austin Howard; Ben Wolf; Andy Dean; Wright	The Boilerhouse Boys; Greenberg; Wright	3:58
13.	"Killing Time"	Beth Gibbons; Stone; Wright	Mangini; Greenberg; Wright	5:12
14.	"Sleep Like a Child"	Patrick Seymour	Mangini; Greenberg; Wright	15:27
15.	"Daniel" (hidden track)	Stone		2:44
Total length:				71:54

Japanese edition bonus tracks
No.	Title	Writer(s)	Producer(s)	Length
15.	"Holding Out for a Hero"	Jim Steinman; Dean Pitchford	Mangini; Greenberg; Wright	3:35
16.	"Dirty Man" (live)	Bobby Miller		10:24
Total length:				85:13

Special edition bonus tracks
No.	Title	Writer(s)	Producer(s)	Length
15.	"The Right Time"	Lew Herman	B. Dozier	3:50
16.	"God Only Knows"	Tony Asher; Brian Wilson	B. Dozier	3:06
17.	"Calling It Christmas" (with Elton John)	John; Bernie Taupin	John; Matt Still	4:14
Total length:				82:24

Special edition bonus DVD
No.	Title	Length
1.	"You Had Me" (music video)	3:53
2.	"Right to Be Wrong" (music video)	3:59
3.	"Spoiled" (music video)	3:50
4.	"Don't Cha Wanna Ride" (music video)	3:36
5.	"Mind Body & Soul" (EPK)	7:00
Total length:		21:38

Dutch limited edition bonus disc (recorded live at De Duif, Amsterdam, 24 January 2005 by Radio 3FM)
No.	Title	Length
1.	"Super Duper Love (Are You Diggin' on Me?) Pt. 1"	7:00
2.	"Fell in Love with a Boy"	5:04
3.	"Spoiled"	4:18
4.	"Less Is More"	4:59
5.	"Right to Be Wrong"	5:25
6.	"You Had Me"	4:53
Total length:		30:59

=== Notes ===
- ^{^[a]} signifies a vocal producer
- The actual duration of music on "Sleep Like a Child" is 5:19; the rest is filled with silence.

=== Sample credits ===
- "Don't Cha Wanna Ride" contains samples from "Soulful Strut" by Young-Holt Unlimited.

== Personnel ==
Credits adapted from the liner notes of Mind Body & Soul.

=== Musicians ===
- Joss Stone – lead vocals (all tracks); backing vocals (tracks 1–6, 9–12)
- AJ Nilo – guitar (tracks 1, 2, 5, 7, 11)
- Jack Daley – bass (tracks 1, 3, 7)
- Cindy Blackman – drums (tracks 1, 3, 7, 11)
- Benny Latimore – piano (tracks 1, 4, 12, 13); Wurlitzer (track 10)
- Raymond Angry – B3 (tracks 1–3, 5, 7, 10); clavinet, Moog (track 3); piano (tracks 5, 7); organ (track 11)
- Tom "Bones" Malone – flugelhorn (tracks 1, 7); trumpet, trombone, tenor saxophone, baritone saxophone (tracks 3, 5, 13)
- Angelo Morris – Fender Rhodes (tracks 1, 3); bass (tracks 4, 12, 13); guitar (tracks 7, 10)
- Betty Wright – background vocals (tracks 1–5, 7–13)
- Bombshell – background vocals (tracks 1–3, 5, 7, 8, 11, 13)
- Pete Iannacone – bass (track 2)
- Jonathan Joseph – drums (tracks 2, 5)
- Nir Zidkyahu – percussion (track 2)
- Jonathan Shorten – Rhodes (tracks 2, 14); synthesiser, drum programming (track 2); programming (tracks 2, 9); keyboards (tracks 2, 6, 9); string arrangement (track 9)
- John Angier – string arrangement (tracks 2, 3, 7, 9, 13, 14)
- Tracey Moore – background vocals (tracks 2, 7)
- Mercedes Martinez – background vocals (tracks 2, 7)
- Mike Mangini – programming (tracks 2–5, 7, 9–11); bass (tracks 5, 14); keyboards (track 5)
- Steve Greenwell – programming (tracks 2–5, 7, 9–11); bass (track 10)
- Nile Rodgers – guitar (track 3)
- David "Jody" Hill – drums (tracks 4, 9, 10, 12, 13)
- Willie "Little Beaver" Hale – guitar (tracks 4, 12, 13)
- Timmy Thomas – B3 (track 4); organ (tracks 10, 12, 13)
- Thom Bell – string arrangement, horn arrangement (track 4)
- Delroy "Chris" Cooper – bass (track 6)
- Earl "Chinna" Smith – guitar (track 6)
- Astor "Crusty" Campbell – drums (track 6)
- Willburn "Squidley" Cole – additional drums (track 6)
- Commissioner Gordon – percussion, programming (track 6)
- Teodross Avery – saxophone (track 6)
- Tanya Darby – trumpet (track 6)
- Stafford Hunter – trombone (track 6)
- Conner Reeves – backing vocal arrangement, background vocals (track 6)
- Danny P. – guitar (tracks 7, 11); bass, Rhodes (track 11); piano (track 14)
- Angie Stone – Rhodes (track 7)
- Margaret Reynolds – background vocals (tracks 7, 13)
- Ellison Kendrick – background vocals (track 7)
- Veronica Sanchez – background vocals (track 7)
- Ruby Baker – background vocals (tracks 7, 13)
- Clovette Danzy – background vocals (track 7)
- Jeanette Wright – background vocals (tracks 7, 13)
- William "Kooly" Scott – background vocals (track 7)
- Salaam Remi – bass, Wurlitzer, organ, strings (track 8)
- Troy Auxilly-Wilson – drums (track 8)
- Van Gibbs – guitar (track 8)
- Vincent Henry – clarinet, alto saxophone, soprano saxophone (track 8)
- Bruce Purse – trumpet, flugelhorn (track 8)
- Jeni Fujita – background vocals (track 8)
- Carl Vandenbosche – percussion (track 9)
- Alan Weekes – electric guitar (track 9)
- Ignacio Nuñez – percussion (track 10)
- Ahmir "Questlove" Thompson – drums (track 14)

=== Orchestra ===
- Sandra Park – violin
- Sharon Yamada – violin
- Lisa Kim – violin
- Tom Carney Myung-Hi Kim – violin
- Sarah Kim – violin
- Fiona Simon – violin
- Soo Hyun Kwon – violin
- Laura Seaton – violin
- Liz Lim – violin
- Jung Sun Yoo – violin
- Matt Lehmann – violin
- Matt Milewski – violin
- Krzysztof Kuznik – violin
- Jessica Lee – violin
- Dawn Hannay – viola
- Carol Cook – viola
- Vivek Kamath – viola
- Dan Panner – viola
- Kevin Mirkin – viola
- Brian Chen – viola
- Elizabeth Dyson – cello
- Jeanne LeBlan – cello
- Sarah Seiver – cello
- Eileen Moon – cello
- Phil Myers – French horn
- Pat Milando – French horn
- Dave Smith – French horn

=== Technical ===
- Michael Mangini – production (tracks 1–5, 7, 9–11, 13, 14); mixing (Note: Mixed at Chung King Studios (New York City)) (tracks 1–11, 13, 14)
- Steve Greenberg – production (tracks 1–5, 7, 9–14); executive production
- Betty Wright – production (tracks 1–5, 7–14); vocal production (tracks 6, 8)
- Jonathan Shorten – production (tracks 2, 9)
- Conner Reeves – production (tracks 2, 9)
- Commissioner Gordon – production, engineering (track 6)
- Salaam Remi – production (track 8)
- Danny P. – production (track 11)
- The Boilerhouse Boys – production (track 12)
- Steve Greenwell – recording (track 9); engineering (tracks 2–5, 7, 9–11); mixing (all tracks)
- Jamie Siegel – engineering (track 6)
- Gary "Mon" Noble – engineering (track 8)
- Shomoni "Sho" Dylan – engineering assistance (track 8)
- Chris Gehringer – mastering (Note: Mastered at Sterling Sound (New York City))

=== Artwork ===
- David Gorman – art direction, design
- Bryan Lasley – art direction, design
- Aleeta Mayo – art direction, design
- Roger Moenks – photography
- Amy Touma – additional photography

== Charts ==
=== Weekly charts ===
Weekly chart performance for Mind Body & Soul
Chart (2004–2005)	Peak position
Australian Albums (ARIA)	7
Austrian Albums (Ö3 Austria)	5
Belgian Albums (Ultratop Flanders)	3
Belgian Albums (Ultratop Wallonia)	24
Canadian Albums (Nielsen SoundScan)	13
Canadian R&B Albums (Nielsen SoundScan)	4
Danish Albums (Hitlisten)	23
Dutch Albums (Album Top 100)	3
European Albums (Billboard)	3
Finnish Albums (Suomen virallinen lista)	28
French Albums (SNEP)	9
German Albums (Offizielle Top 100)	7
Greek International Albums (IFPI)	3
Irish Albums (IRMA)	10
Italian Albums (FIMI)	12
Japanese Albums (Oricon)	23
New Zealand Albums (RMNZ)	5
Norwegian Albums (VG-lista)	10
Polish Albums (ZPAV)	24
Portuguese Albums (AFP)	5
Scottish Albums (OCC)	2
Spanish Albums (PROMUSICAE)	59
Swedish Albums (Sverigetopplistan)	21
Swiss Albums (Schweizer Hitparade)	6
UK Albums (OCC)	1
UK R&B Albums (OCC)	1
US Billboard 200	11
US Top R&B/Hip-Hop Albums (Billboard)	15

=== Year-end charts ===
2004 year-end chart performance for Mind Body & Soul
Chart (2004)	Position
Belgian Albums (Ultratop Flanders)	39
Dutch Albums (Album Top 100)	33
French Albums (SNEP)	169
Swiss Albums (Schweizer Hitparade)	58
UK Albums (OCC)	33
Worldwide Albums (IFPI)	50

2005 year-end chart performance for Mind Body & Soul
Chart (2005)	Position
Belgian Albums (Ultratop Flanders)	27
Dutch Albums (Album Top 100)	21
European Albums (Billboard)	35
German Albums (Offizielle Top 100)	41
Swiss Albums (Schweizer Hitparade)	52
UK Albums (OCC)	49
US Billboard 200	73
US Top R&B/Hip-Hop Albums (Billboard)	55

== Certifications ==
Certifications for Mind Body & Soul
Region	Certification	Certified units/sales
Argentina (CAPIF)	Platinum	40,000^{^}
Australia (ARIA)	Gold	35,000^{^}
Austria (IFPI Austria)	Platinum	30,000^{*}
Brazil (Pro-Música Brasil)	Gold	50,000^{*}
Germany (BVMI)	Platinum	200,000^{^}
Netherlands (NVPI)	Platinum	80,000^{^}
New Zealand (RMNZ)	Gold	7,500^{^}
Portugal (AFP)	Gold	20,000^{^}
Switzerland (IFPI Switzerland)	Gold	20,000^{^}
United Kingdom (BPI)	3× Platinum	940,617
United States (RIAA)	Platinum	1,300,000
Summaries
Europe (IFPI)	Platinum	1,000,000^{*}
^{*} Sales figures based on certification alone.^{^} Shipments figures based on certification alone.

== Release history ==
Release dates and formats for Mind Body & Soul
Region	Date	Format	Edition	Label	Ref.
Japan	15 September 2004	CD	Standard	EMI	
Australia	24 September 2004	CD	Standard	EMI	
Germany	24 September 2004	CD	Standard	EMI	
Netherlands	27 September 2004	CD	Standard	EMI	
United Kingdom	27 September 2004	CD	Standard	Relentless; Virgin	
Canada	28 September 2004	CD	Standard	EMI	
United States	28 September 2004	CD	Standard	S-Curve	
Netherlands	8 July 2005	CD + DVD	Limited	EMI	
Germany	11 November 2005	CD + DVD	Special	EMI	
United Kingdom	14 November 2005	CD + DVD	Special	Relentless; Virgin	
Canada	15 November 2005	CD + DVD	Special	EMI	
Netherlands	18 November 2005	CD + DVD	Special	EMI	
Australia	21 November 2005	CD + DVD	Special	EMI	
United States	22 November 2005	CD + DVD	Special	S-Curve	
Japan	14 December 2005	CD + DVD	Special	EMI	
Spain	16 January 2006	CD + DVD	Special	EMI	
