= The Velveteen Age =

EP by Diane Birch
- Released: December 7, 2010
- Genre: Neo soul, pop, gospel
- Length: 30:01
- Label: S-Curve
- Producer: Steve Greenberg, Sean Marquand, Daniel Collás

Diane Birch chronology
Bible Belt (2009)	The Velveteen Age (2010)	Speak a Little Louder (2013)

The Velveteen Age is an EP released by Diane Birch with the Phenomenal Handclap Band. It consists of covers of songs she enjoyed while growing up. Birch and the band re-imagined the dark eighties and nineties music with exuberance instead of melancholy, giving them the feel of seventies pop. The picture on the cover is Birch at age 16, wearing a vintage Victorian wedding dress.

== Track listing ==
No.	Title	Writer(s)	Original performer	Length
1.	"This Corrosion"	Andrew Eldritch	The Sisters of Mercy	3:39
2.	"Kiss Them for Me"	Susan Ballion, Peter Edward Clarke, Martin McCarrick, Steven Severin	Siouxsie and the Banshees	4:12
3.	"Bring On the Dancing Horses"	Will Sergeant, Ian McCulloch, Les Pattinson, Pete de Freitas	Echo & the Bunnymen	4:32
4.	"Atmosphere"	Bernard Sumner, Peter Hook, Stephen Morris, Ian Curtis	Joy Division	5:03
5.	"Primary"	Robert Smith, Simon Gallup, Laurence "Lol" Tolhurst	The Cure	3:43
6.	"Tarantula"	Martyn Young, Ian Robbins	This Mortal Coil	4:25
7.	"A Strange Kind of Love"	Peter Murphy	Peter Murphy	4:27
Total length:				30:01
