= Diane Birch =

American singer-songwriter (born 1983)

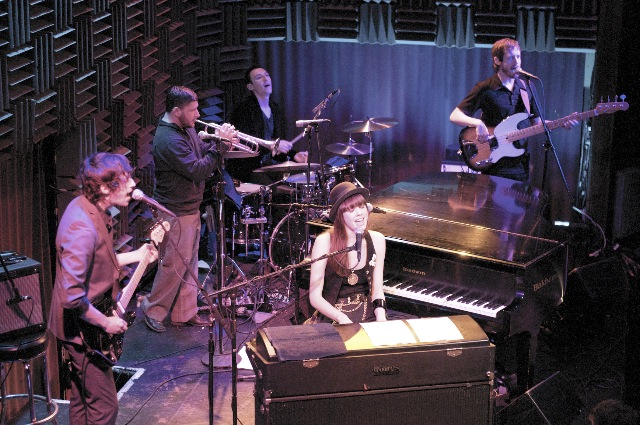
- Diane Birch in 2009

Background information
- Born: January 24, 1983 (age 43); Michigan
- Origin: Portland, Oregon, U.S.
- Genres: Soul, blues, rock, synth-pop
- Occupation: Singer-songwriter
- Instruments: Keyboards, piano, vocal, synthesizer
- Years active: 2009–present
- Labels: S-Curve, Hymnpatia
- Website: www.dianebirch.com

Diane Birch (born January 24, 1983) is an American singer-songwriter.

== Early life ==
Birch was born in Michigan. At the age of seven she began studying piano using the Suzuki method. While growing up she listened to opera, classical and church music. Birch's father was a Seventh-day Adventist missionary in Zimbabwe, South Africa and Sydney, Australia, and as a result Birch spent her early years abroad. When she was ten, her family returned to the United States, and settled in Portland, Oregon. Birch attended Portland Adventist Elementary School and later, Portland Adventist Academy.

== Career ==
Early in her career Birch moved to Los Angeles and set out to compose music for films but instead played piano at the Beverly Hills Hotel and L'Orangerie. During this period Prince heard her perform at the Polo Lounge in 2006 and invited her to join him at his home for a music session with his band. Later, Birch moved to London, where she signed a publishing contract and wrote most of the songs that appeared on her debut album.

In 2007, she moved to New York City after signing with Steve Greenberg's S-Curve Records. Birch's debut album, Bible Belt, recorded in New York and New Orleans, was released in 2009 on S-Curve and received supportive reviews in Rolling Stone, Paper Magazine and the Huffington Post.

In 2009, Birch made a number of television appearances to promote her album Bible Belt, including: The Late Late Show with Craig Ferguson, Late Show with David Letterman, Last Call with Carson Daly, Jimmy Kimmel Live!, The Tonight Show with Conan O'Brien, The Tonight Show with Jay Leno and the webcast, Live From Daryl's House Birch was interviewed on National Public Radio's Weekend Edition Sunday on June 14, 2009, on which she performed several of her songs from Bible Belt.

Her song "Rise Up" was the Starbucks iTunes Pick of the Week in October 2009 and her song "Valentino" appeared in the movie Valentine's Day.

In 2010, Birch was the opening act for Stevie Wonder at the "Hard Rock Calling Festival" in Hyde Park and Nîmes, France and Nick Jonas and the Administration. In September, Birch released the single track "Gee Whiz It's Christmas" on Amazon and iTunes. In December Birch released an EP titled The Velveteen Age, on which she performs covers of songs she enjoyed while growing up.

In 2013, she was featured in English rapper Devlin's song "Rewind," singing a chorus based on her original version from Bible Belt.

In addition to keyboards, Birch also plays guitar and the violin.

Her second album, Speak a Little Louder, was released on October 15, 2013, in the US and the UK.

Birch released her first self-produced mini-album, Nous on January 31, 2016. The EP was recorded in Berlin, Germany.

Her third album, Flying on Abraham, was released on April 12, 2024, in the US.

== Discography ==
=== Studio albums ===
| Title | Album details | Peak chart positions | | |
| Title | Album details | US | UK | ITA |
|---|---|---|---|---|
| Bible Belt | First studio album; Released: May 19, 2009; Label: S-Curve | 87 | 77 | 26 |
| Speak a Little Louder | Second studio album; Released: October 15, 2013; Label: S-Curve | 195 | N/A | N/A |
| Flying on Abraham | Third studio album; Released: April 12, 2024; Label: Legere | – | – | – |

=== Extended play ===
| Title | EP details |
|---|---|
| iTunes Session – EP | Released: January 1, 2010; Label: S-Curve; Formats: Digital Download |
| The Velveteen Age (with the Phenomenal Handclap Band) | Released: December 7, 2010; Label: S-Curve; Formats: CD (limited), Digital Download |
| Nous | Released: January 31, 2016; Self-produced, released on bandcamp; Label: Hymnpatia; Formats: CD (limited), Digital Download |

=== Singles ===
==== As lead artist ====
| Year | Single | Peak chart positions | | Album |
| Year | Single | US Alternative | JP 100 | Album |
|---|---|---|---|---|
| 2009 | "Nothing but a Miracle" | 29 | 52 | Bible Belt |
| 2009 | "Valentino" | — | 55 | Bible Belt |
| 2010 | "This Corrosion" | — | — | The Velveteen Age |
| 2011 | "Wind Up Bird Song (For Japan)" | — | — | — |
| 2014 | "All the Love You Got" | — | 98 | Speak a Little Louder |
| 2016 | "Nite Time Talking" | — | — | — |
| 2017 | "The End" | — | — | — |
| 2018 | "In It for the Race" | — | — | — |
| 2024 | "Wind Machine" | — | — | Flying on Abraham |
"—" denotes single that did not chart or was not released.

==== As featured artist ====
| Year | Single | Peak chart positions | Album |
| Year | Single | UK | Album |
|---|---|---|---|
| 2013 | "Rewind" (Devlin featuring Diane Birch) | 10 | A Moving Picture |
| 2017 | "Time to Kill" (DC Breaks featuring Diane Birch) | — | Different Breed |

=== Other appearances ===
| Year | Title | Album |
|---|---|---|
| 2009 | "Valentino" | Valentine's Day |
| 2009 | "Too Soon to End" (with Alain Clark) | ColourBlind |

=== Music videos ===
| Year | Title | Director |
|---|---|---|
| 2009 | "Nothing but a Miracle" | Moh Azima |
| 2010 | "Valentino" | Dennis Liu |
| 2010 | "Rewind" | Gavin Elder |
| 2013 | "All the Love You Got" | Gene Doe |
