= Nous (disambiguation) =

Nous is a philosophical term for the faculty of the human mind.

Nous may also refer to:

- Noûs, quarterly peer-reviewed academic journal on philosophy
- Nous (Daniel Bélanger album), 2009
- Nous (Diane Birch EP), 2016
- Nous, Aeon of Erudition in Honkai: Star Rail
