= Elise LeGrow =

Canadian singer and songwriter (born 1987)

- Born: Elise Madeline LeGrow; 4 June 1987 (age 39)
- Origin: Canada
- Instrument: Singing
- Label: Big Top Records
- Website: eliselegrow.com

Elise Madeline LeGrow (born June 4, 1987) is a Canadian recording artist and songwriter.

LeGrow was offered a publishing deal from Sony/ATV Music Publishing following a live performance at the 2009 NXNE music festival in Toronto.

Her first release, "No Good Woman," was the most added single on adult contemporary radio in Canada the week of April 7, 2012. The single peaked at number six on the Nielsen BDS Adult Contemporary chart, and remained in the top 10 for 13 weeks.

In 2016, LeGrow signed with Awesome Music in Canada, which brought on S-Curve/BMG as her label in the US. Later in 2016, she recorded a full-length concept album of Chess Records covers titled Playing Chess. The album was produced by Steve Greenberg, Michael Mangini and Betty Wright. Questlove and Captain Kirk Douglas as well as The Dap Kings made contributions to the record.

LeGrow released "You Never Can Tell," by Chuck Berry as her first single from the record on May 19, 2017. In June 2016, she released "Who Do You Love", debuted at No. 15 on the CBC Radio 2 chart and eventually hit Top 10 on the CBC Radio 2 chart.

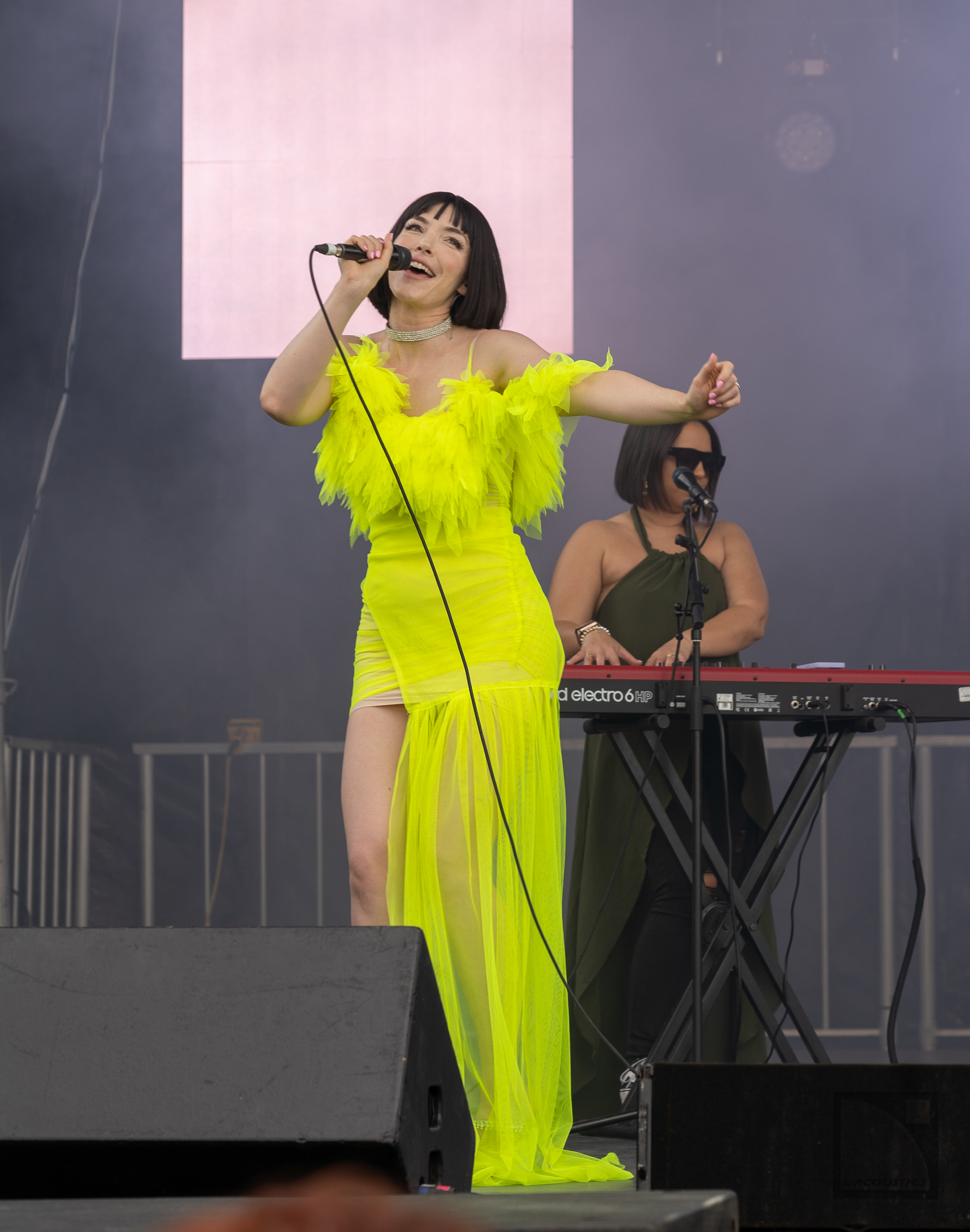
Elise LeGrow performing in 2024

LeGrow released her debut album Playing Chess on February 16, 2018. Elise LeGrow released the single "Evan" on July 17, 2020, and in 2021 released a second album, Grateful.

In April 2022, LeGrow was featured on "Temptation" by DJ Bakermat, the first record on his label Big Top Amsterdam. She also featured on "Hey Hey (Heard You Say)" by Cat Dealers & Lucas Vane released in July 2022.
