= You Had Me =

2004 single by Joss Stone

Single by Joss Stone

from the album Mind Body & Soul
- B-side: "Holding Out for a Hero"
- Released: 13 September 2004
- Recorded: 14 August 2003
- Studio: Chung King, Mojo, Right Track Recording (New York City)
- Genre: Soul; funk
- Length: 3:59
- Label: Relentless; S-Curve; Virgin
- Songwriters: Joss Stone; Francis White; Wendy Stoker; Betty Wright
- Producers: Michael Mangini; Steve Greenberg; Betty Wright

Joss Stone singles chronology
"Super Duper Love" (2004)	"You Had Me" (2004)	"Right to Be Wrong" (2004)

Music video
- "You Had Me" on YouTube

"You Had Me" is a song by English singer and songwriter Joss Stone from her second studio album, Mind Body & Soul (2004). It was released on 13 September 2004 as the album's lead single. The song was written by Stone, Francis "Eg" White, Wendy Stoker, and Betty Wright. "You Had Me" peaked at number nine on the UK Singles Chart, earning Stone her highest-peaking single on the chart to date. Additionally, the song received a nomination for Best Female Pop Vocal Performance at the 47th Grammy Awards in 2005 but lost out to "Sunrise" by Norah Jones.

== Recording ==
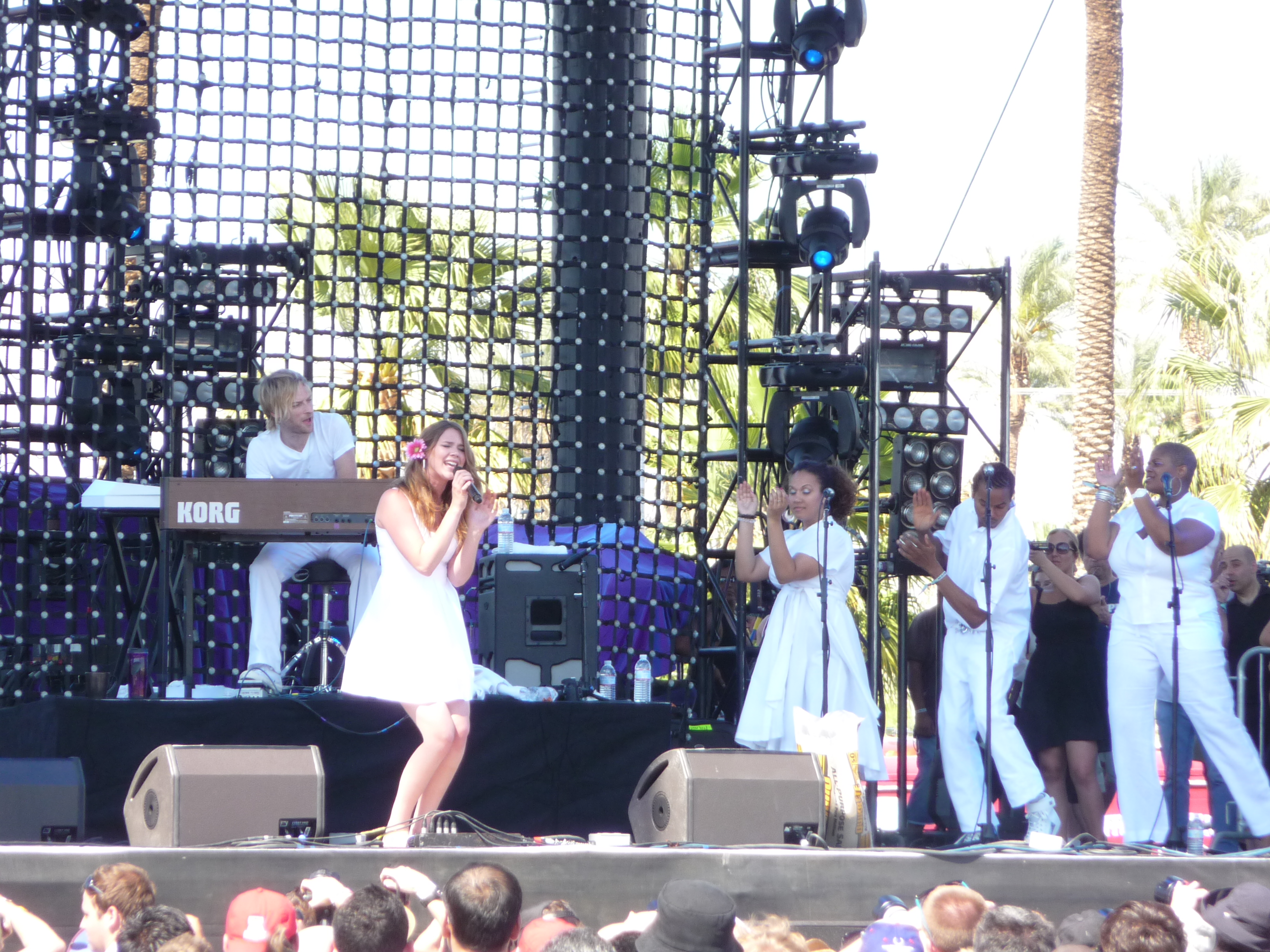
Stone performing "You Had Me" at the 2009 Coachella Festival

"You Had Me" was recorded in New York City on the afternoon of 14 August 2003, with Nile Rodgers on guitar, Jack Daley on bass, Cindy Blackman on drums and Betty Wright, who provided backing vocals and co-produced the track. Two seconds after completing the recording and pressing the "save" button on the computer, the lights went out in the studio at 4:09 pm, caused by the Great Blackout of 2003, which affected the Northeastern and the Midwestern United States, as well as the Canadian province of Ontario. Steve Greenberg, who also co-produced the track, stated:

They played the song live in the studio for nearly fifteen minutes—it just kept going and going because the vibe was so exciting. Finally, the musicians finished this incredible take—which we knew was the keeper—and we pushed the 'Save' button on the computer. Literally two seconds after that button was pushed, the lights went out in the studio. Betty Wright said, 'You guys funked so hard, you blew the lights out!' Little did we know that we were in the middle of the Great Eastern Blackout of 2003. If the band had played for even another 30 seconds, we wouldn't have been able to hit the 'Save' button—and this magical take would have been lost forever!

== Commercial performance ==
"You Had Me" debuted and peaked at number nine on the UK Singles Chart, becoming Stone's highest-peaking single on the chart to date. It also peaked at number two on the UK R&B Singles Chart. The song was particularly successful in the Netherlands, reaching number four on the Dutch Top 40. Elsewhere in Europe, it charted at number 14 in Hungary, number 15 in Italy, number 20 in Greece, and number 21 in Belgium. "You Had Me" became Stone's first single to chart in Australia, where it peaked at number 23.

== Music video ==
The music video for "You Had Me" was directed by Chris Robinson and filmed in downtown Los Angeles, doubling as New York City. It opens with a man named Anthony arriving at his flat and calling Stone's name, before spotting a note stuck on the refrigerator. The video then shows what had happened 13 minutes earlier: Stone at the flat, sitting by the window, anguishedly writing down things on a paper. A flashback sequence shows that Anthony had been partying out with other girls in a bar. He suddenly gets angry and overthrows a table, causing him to be kicked out of the bar. The video cuts back to Stone, who packs her things and leaves the flat after leaving the note stuck on the refrigerator. In the hallway, the lift taking Anthony back to the floor opens just a few seconds after she passes by. Stone then heads for the Prince Street station. Meanwhile, Anthony arrives at the flat and soon notices the note on the refrigerator; he looks upset as he reads it. Soon after Stone leaves the underground, the video shows her walking through the city. She rings up a friend on a payphone, asking if she could come to her house; the friend answers that she "could always come over." The video ends with Stone singing the song's final verse while dancing on the roof of her friend's block of flats.

== Track listings ==
- UK CD 1
1. "You Had Me" (album edit) – 3:35
2. "Dirty Man" (live at the House of Blues, Chicago) – 3:08
- UK CD 2
1. "You Had Me" (album edit) – 3:35
2. "Holding Out for a Hero" – 3:21
3. "Fell in Love with a Boy" (radio version) – 2:55
4. "Fell in Love with a Boy" (video) – 3:00
- UK DVD single
1. "You Had Me" (video) – 3:37
2. "Super Duper Love" (video) – 3:47
3. "Fell in Love with a Boy" (acoustic version) – 3:30

- German CD single
1. "You Had Me" (album edit) – 3:35
2. "Holding Out for a Hero" – 3:21
3. "Dirty Man" (live at the House of Blues, Chicago) – 3:11
4. "Super Duper Love" (single mix edit) – 2:56
- Australian CD single
1. "You Had Me" (album edit) – 3:35
2. "Super Duper Love" (single mix edit) – 2:56
3. "Dirty Man" (live at the House of Blues, Chicago) – 3:11
- Canadian CD single
1. "You Had Me" – 3:35
2. "Holding Out for a Hero" – 3:21

== Personnel ==
Personnel are adapted from the liner notes of Mind Body & Soul.

- Joss Stone – lead vocals, backing vocals, songwriting
- John Angier – string arrangement
- Raymond Angry – B3, clavinet, Moog
- Cindy Blackman – drums
- Bombshell – backing vocals
- Jack Daley – bass
- Chris Gehringer – mastering
- Steve Greenberg – production
- Steve Greenwell – engineering, mixing, programming
- Tom "Bones" Malone – baritone saxophone, tenor saxophone, trombone, trumpet
- Michael Mangini – mixing, production, programming
- Angelo Morris – Rhodes
- Nile Rodgers – guitar
- Wendy Stoker – songwriting
- Eg White – songwriting
- Betty Wright – backing vocals, production, songwriting

== Charts ==
=== Weekly charts ===
Chart (2004–2005)	Peak position
Australia (ARIA)	23
Austria (Ö3 Austria Top 40)	54
Belgium (Ultratop 50 Flanders)	21
Belgium (Ultratip Bubbling Under Wallonia)	2
Canada (Nielsen SoundScan)	29
Croatia (HRT)	1
Germany (GfK)	77
Greece (IFPI Greece)	20
Hungary (Rádiós Top 40)	14
Ireland (IRMA)	34
Italy (FIMI)	15
Netherlands (Dutch Top 40)	4
Netherlands (Single Top 100)	14
New Zealand (Recorded Music NZ)	26
Romania (Romanian Top 100)	91
Scottish Singles Sales (Official Charts)	10
Switzerland (Schweizer Hitparade)	40
UK Singles (Official Charts)	9
UK Hip Hop/R&B (Official Charts)	2

=== Year-end charts ===
Chart (2004)	Position
Netherlands (Dutch Top 40)	53
UK Singles (OCC)	149

Chart (2005)	Position
Hungary (Rádiós Top 40)	97

== Release history ==
Region	Date	Format(s)	Label(s)	Ref(s).
United States	23 August 2004	Rhythmic contemporary; contemporary hit radio	S-Curve; EMI	
Australia	13 September 2004	CD single; digital download	EMI	
Germany	13 September 2004	CD single; digital download	EMI	
United Kingdom	13 September 2004	CD single; DVD single; digital download	Relentless; S-Curve; Virgin	
Canada	21 September 2004	CD single	EMI	
