= The Soul Sessions =

2003 studio album by Joss Stone

Studio album by Joss Stone
- Released: 16 September 2003
- Recorded: 9 April – 12 May 2003
- Studio: The Hit Factory Criteria (Miami) (Note: Tracks 1, 2, 4, 6 and 8); The Studio (Philadelphia) (Note: Track 3); Mojo (New York City) (Note: Tracks 5, 7 and 10)
- Genre: Soul
- Length: 42:06
- Label: S-Curve
- Producer: Steve Greenberg; Michael Mangini; Ahmir "Questlove" Thompson; Betty Wright

Joss Stone chronology
The Soul Sessions (2003)	Mind Body & Soul (2004)

Singles from The Soul Sessions
- 1. "Fell in Love with a Boy" Released: 24 January 2004; 2. "Super Duper Love" Released: 10 May 2004

The Soul Sessions is the debut studio album by English singer and songwriter Joss Stone, released on 16 September 2003 by S-Curve Records. The album consists of cover versions of soul songs from the 1960s and 1970s, in addition to a cover of the White Stripes' 2001 song "Fell in Love with a Girl" (renamed "Fell in Love with a Boy"). In 2004, The Soul Sessions was shortlisted for the Mercury Prize and was nominated for a MOBO Award for Best Album.

== Background ==
The Soul Sessions was produced by Miami soul singer Betty Wright and S-Curve Records chief executive officer Steve Greenberg. Stone worked with veteran Miami soul musicians Benny Latimore, Little Beaver, Timmy Thomas and Wright herself. She also worked with contemporary musicians such as neo soul singer Angie Stone and the alternative hip hop group the Roots.

Stone told MTV News that she felt intimidated by the credentials of the musicians that worked on the album. "It was weird because they've worked with so many great, great singers. I'm talking the best. I kind of walked in, just like this little girl and started singing."

== Critical reception ==
Professional ratings
Aggregate scores
Source	Rating
Metacritic	74/100
Review scores
Source	Rating
AllMusic	4/5 stars
Blender	3/5 stars
Entertainment Weekly	B+
The Guardian	3/5 stars
The New Zealand Herald	5/5 stars
Rolling Stone	3/5 stars
Stylus Magazine	C
The Village Voice	C+
Yahoo! Music UK	8/10 stars

The Soul Sessions received positive reviews from music critics. At Metacritic, which assigns a normalised rating out of 100 to reviews from mainstream publications, the album received an average score of 74, based on 15 reviews. Jon Caramanica of Rolling Stone stated that "Stone shines on this impressive covers set" and that "[s]he chooses songs wisely." AllMusic's Thom Jurek wrote that Stone "has unique phrasing and a huge voice that accents, dips, and slips, never overworking a song or trying to bring attention to itself via hollow acrobatics." Jim Greer from Entertainment Weekly noted that Stone "does have an extraordinary voice", but added that "the only misguided ploy on The Soul Sessions is a Roots-produced slo-mo cover of a White Stripes tune." Russell Baillie from The New Zealand Herald opined that "with her strong, emotive voice she nails it time and again, and with performances that aren't an excuse for the vocal acrobatic show you imagine this would have been had Stone been America's next bright young thing."

The Guardian's Dorian Lynskey described her singing as "rich, mature and agile but not showy". Nick Duerden of Blender magazine commented that "Stone's voice is remarkably authentic, and the atmosphere she conjures is smoky and sleazy, pure mid-'60s Detroit." Jason MacNeil wrote for PopMatters that her voice is "more of a soulful voice than those so-called soul divas out there today" and that it "oozes sex appeal as Benny Latimore's piano weaves some magic." At The A.V. Club, Keith Phipps remarked that "Sessions establishes Stone as a formidable interpreter." Andrew McGregor of BBC Music felt that the album "seems a bit of an artistic compromise, music from the rule book rather than the heart." Similarly, The Village Voice critic Robert Christgau viewed Stone's covers as "the kind of soul marginalia Brits have been overrating since Doris Troy was on Apple".

== Commercial performance ==
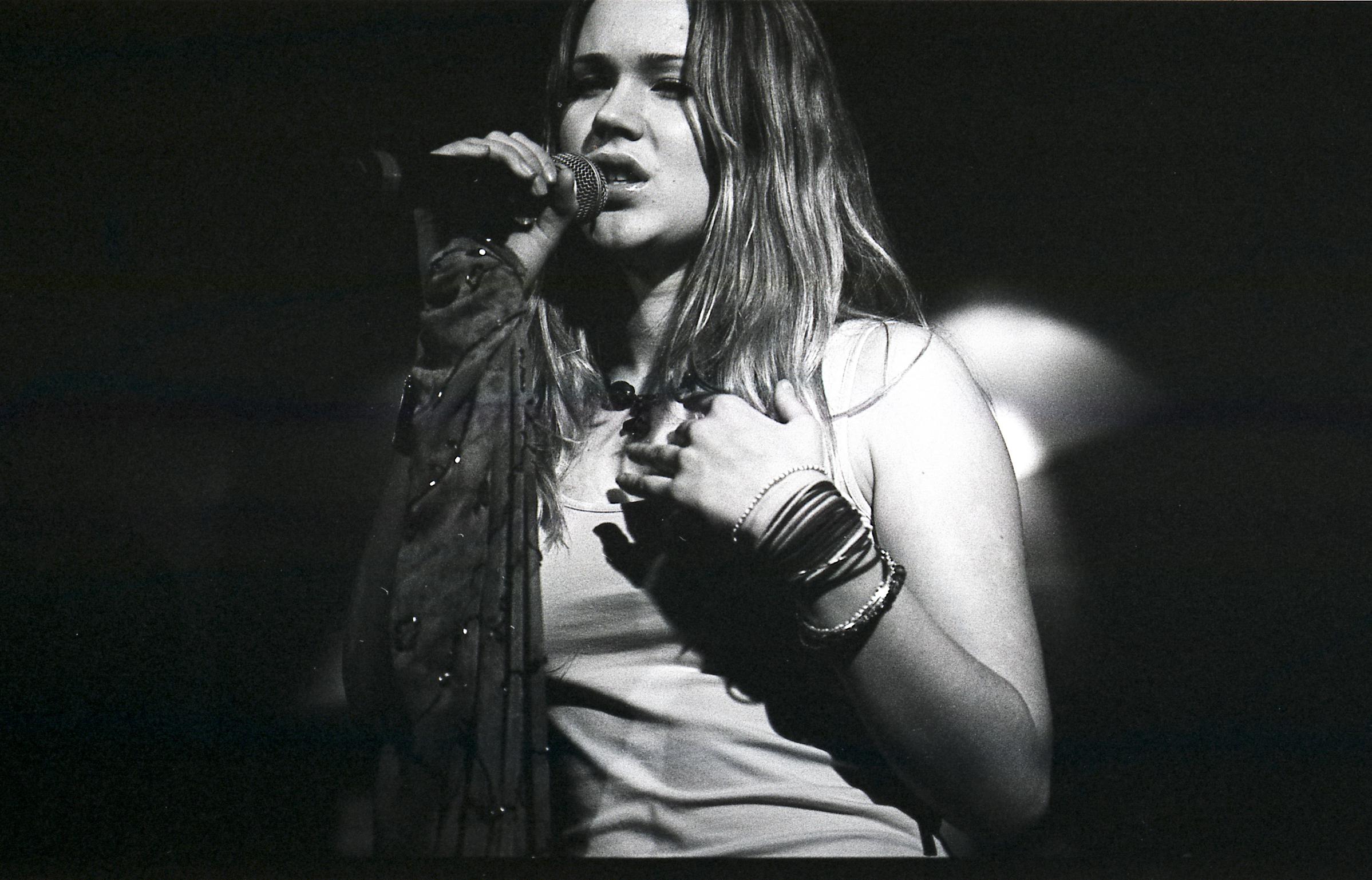
Stone performing in Milan in 2005

The Soul Sessions entered the UK Albums Chart at number 89 for the week ending 10 January 2004, peaking at number four in its fifth week on the chart. The British Phonographic Industry (BPI) certified the album triple platinum on 15 April 2005, and by July 2012, it had sold 1,075,492 copies in the United Kingdom. Additionally, it became the 16th best-selling album of 2004 in the UK.

In the United States, The Soul Sessions was a sleeper hit. On the issue dated 4 October 2003, the album debuted at number 199 on the Billboard 200 and at number 76 on the Top R&B/Hip-Hop Albums, peaking at number 39 on the former and at number 38 on the latter in its 24th week on both charts, on the issue dated 8 May 2004. Prior to that, the album topped the Top Heatseekers chart during the week of 21 February 2004. Sales were high on the East Coast, especially in cities such as New York City, Philadelphia and Boston. Within six months of its release, The Soul Sessions was certified gold by the Recording Industry Association of America (RIAA) on 29 March 2004. The album had sold 981,000 units in the US as of July 2011.

The album was also commercially successful in the rest of Europe, where it reached number four in Austria, Germany, the Netherlands and Norway, number five in Portugal, number seven in Belgium, number eight in Italy, number 12 in Sweden and number 14 in Switzerland, as well as number four on the European Top 100 Albums. In June 2004, The Soul Sessions was awarded a Platinum Europe Award by the International Federation of the Phonographic Industry (IFPI) for sales in excess of one million copies across Europe. In Oceania, the album peaked at number 16 in Australia and number eight in New Zealand, earning platinum accreditations from the Australian Recording Industry Association (ARIA) and the Recording Industry Association of New Zealand (RIANZ) for sales in excess of 70,000 and 15,000 copies, respectively. The Soul Sessions had sold five million copies worldwide as of June 2012.

== Track listing ==
All tracks are produced by Betty Wright, Steve Greenberg and Michael Mangini, except "Fell in Love with a Boy" and "The Player", produced by Ahmir "Questlove" Thompson, Wright, Greenberg and Mangini, and "I've Fallen in Love with You", produced by Greenberg and Mangini.

No.	Title	Writer(s)	Original artist	Length
1.	"The Chokin' Kind"	Harlan Howard	Waylon Jennings (1967)	3:35
2.	"Super Duper Love (Are You Diggin' on Me?) Pt. 1"	Willie Garner	Sugar Billy (1974)	4:20
3.	"Fell in Love with a Boy"	Jack White	The White Stripes (2001)	3:38
4.	"Victim of a Foolish Heart"	Charles Buckins; George Jackson	Bettye Swann (1972)	5:31
5.	"Dirty Man"	Bobby Miller	Laura Lee (1967)	2:59
6.	"Some Kind of Wonderful"	John Ellison	Soul Brothers Six (1967)	3:56
7.	"I've Fallen in Love with You"	Carla Thomas	Carla Thomas (1968)	4:29
8.	"I Had a Dream"	John Sebastian	John Sebastian (1970)	3:01
9.	"All the King's Horses"	Aretha Franklin	Aretha Franklin (1972)	3:03
10.	"For the Love of You Pts. 1 & 2"	Ernest Isley; Marvin Isley; O'Kelly Isley, Jr.; Ronald Isley; Rudolph Isley; Christopher Jasper	The Isley Brothers (1975)	7:33
Total length:				42:06

Japanese edition bonus track
No.	Title	Writer(s)	Original artist	Length
11.	"The Player"	Norman Harris; Allan Felder	First Choice (1974)	4:41
Total length:				46:47

French limited edition bonus DVD
No.	Title	Length
1.	"Fell in Love with a Boy" (music video)	3:02
2.	"Super Duper Love" (music video)	3:56
3.	"It's a Man's Man's World" (live at Kennedy Center, Washington, D.C., 7 December 2003) (audio)	3:35
4.	"Victim of a Foolish Heart" (live at Ronnie Scott's, London, 25 November 2003) (audio)	6:25
Total length:		16:18

== Personnel ==
Credits adapted from the liner notes of The Soul Sessions.

=== Musicians ===
- Joss Stone – vocals
- Willie "Little Beaver" Hale – guitar (tracks 1, 2, 4, 6, 8, 9)
- Timmy Thomas – organ (tracks 1, 2, 4, 8)
- Benny Latimore – piano (tracks 1, 2, 4, 6, 8, 9)
- Jack Daley – bass (tracks 1, 2, 4, 6, 8, 9)
- Cindy Blackman – drums (tracks 1, 2, 4, 6, 8, 9)
- Angelo Morris – acoustic guitar (track 1); guitar (tracks 2, 4, 5); organ (tracks 6, 9); keyboards (track 10)
- Betty Wright – background vocals (tracks 1–3, 4, 6, 9, 11)
- Jeanette Wright – background vocals (tracks 1, 2, 4, 6, 9)
- Namphuyo Aisha McCray – background vocals (tracks 1, 2, 4, 6, 9)
- Ignacio Nunez – percussion (track 2)
- Mike Mangini – tambourine (track 2)
- Angie Stone – background vocals (tracks 3, 11)
- Ahmir "Questlove" Thompson – drums (tracks 3, 7, 11)
- Kirk Douglas – guitar (tracks 3, 11)
- Adam Blackstone – bass (tracks 3, 11)
- James Poyser – keyboards (tracks 3, 11)
- Kamal – keyboards (track 3)
- Jimmy Farkus – acoustic guitar (track 5)
- John Angier – string arrangement (track 7)
- Danny Pierre – keyboards (track 7)
- Mark Ciprit – guitar (track 7)
- Sam Furnace – saxophone (track 7)
- Steve Greenwell – bass (track 7)
- Taneka Duggan – background vocals (track 7)
- Deanna Carroll – background vocals (track 7)
- Sandra Park – violin (track 7)
- Lisa Kim – violin (track 7)
- Sharon Yamada – violin (track 7)
- Myung Hi Kim – violin (track 7)
- Fiona Simon – violin (track 7)
- Sarah Kim – violin (track 7)
- Laura Seaton – violin (track 7)
- Liz Lim – violin (track 7)
- Soo Hyun Kwon – violin (track 7)
- Jenny Strenger – violin (track 7)
- Jung Sun Yoo – violin (track 7)
- Rob Shaw – violin (track 7)
- Karen Dreyfus – viola (track 7)
- Robert Rinehart – viola (track 7)
- Dawn Hannay – viola (track 7)
- Tom Rosenfeld – viola (track 7)
- Alan Stepansky – cello (track 7)
- Sarah Seiver – cello (track 7)
- Jeremy Turner – cello (track 7)
- Leanne LeBlanc – cello (track 7)

=== Technical ===
- Betty Wright – production (tracks 1–6, 8–11)
- Steve Greenberg – production, executive production
- Michael Mangini – production
- Steve Greenwell – engineering, mixing
- Ahmir "Questlove" Thompson – production (tracks 3, 11)
- Chris Gehringer – mastering at Sterling Sound (New York City)

=== Artwork ===
- David Gorman – art direction, design
- Bryan Lasley – art direction, design
- Charles Allen Smith – photography
- Karen Fuchs – photography

== Charts ==
=== Weekly charts ===
Weekly chart performance for The Soul Sessions
Chart (2003–2004)	Peak position
Australian Albums (ARIA)	16
Austrian Albums (Ö3 Austria)	4
Belgian Albums (Ultratop Flanders)	7
Belgian Albums (Ultratop Wallonia)	23
Canadian Albums (Nielsen SoundScan)	19
Canadian R&B Albums (Nielsen SoundScan)	5
Danish Albums (Hitlisten)	15
Dutch Albums (Album Top 100)	4
European Albums (Billboard)	4
French Albums (SNEP)	23
German Albums (Offizielle Top 100)	4
Greek International Albums (IFPI)	1
Irish Albums (IRMA)	32
Italian Albums (FIMI)	8
Japanese Albums (Oricon)	91
New Zealand Albums (RMNZ)	8
Norwegian Albums (VG-lista)	4
Polish Albums (ZPAV)	28
Portuguese Albums (AFP)	5
Scottish Albums (OCC)	7
Swedish Albums (Sverigetopplistan)	12
Swiss Albums (Schweizer Hitparade)	14
UK Albums (OCC)	4
UK R&B Albums (OCC)	1
US Billboard 200	39
US Top R&B/Hip-Hop Albums (Billboard)	38

=== Year-end charts ===
2004 year-end chart performance for The Soul Sessions
Chart (2004)	Position
Australian Albums (ARIA)	48
Austrian Albums (Ö3 Austria)	55
Belgian Albums (Ultratop Flanders)	32
Dutch Albums (Album Top 100)	23
French Albums (SNEP)	106
German Albums (Offizielle Top 100)	45
Italian Albums (FIMI)	70
New Zealand Albums (RMNZ)	20
Swiss Albums (Schweizer Hitparade)	62
UK Albums (OCC)	16
US Billboard 200	156
Worldwide Albums (IFPI)	39

2005 year-end chart performance for The Soul Sessions
Chart (2005)	Position
UK Albums (OCC)	95

== Certifications and sales ==
Certifications for The Soul Sessions
Region	Certification	Certified units/sales
Argentina (CAPIF)	Gold	20,000^{^}
Australia (ARIA)	Platinum	70,000^{^}
Austria (IFPI Austria)	Platinum	30,000^{*}
Belgium (BRMA)	Platinum	50,000^{*}
Brazil as of 2004	—	35,000
Canada (Music Canada)	Platinum	100,000^{^}
France (SNEP)	Gold	100,000^{*}
Germany (BVMI)	Gold	100,000^{^}
Greece (IFPI Greece)	Gold	10,000^{^}
Ireland (IRMA)	Platinum	15,000^{^}
Italy (FIMI)	Gold	50,000^{*}
Netherlands (NVPI)	Platinum	80,000^{^}
New Zealand (RMNZ)	Platinum	15,000^{^}
Norway (IFPI Norway)	Gold	20,000^{*}
Portugal (AFP)	Silver	10,000^{^}
Switzerland (IFPI Switzerland)	Gold	20,000^{^}
United Kingdom (BPI)	3× Platinum	1,075,492
United States (RIAA)	Gold	981,000
Summaries
Europe (IFPI)	Platinum	1,000,000^{*}
Worldwide	—	5,000,000
^{*} Sales figures based on certification alone.^{^} Shipments figures based on certification alone.

== Release history ==
Release dates and formats for The Soul Sessions
Region	Date	Format	Edition	Label	Ref.
United States	16 September 2003	CD	Standard	S-Curve	
Canada	28 October 2003	CD	Standard	EMI	
United Kingdom	24 November 2003	CD	Standard	Relentless; Virgin	
Japan	16 January 2004	CD	Standard	EMI	
Netherlands	23 January 2004	CD	Standard	EMI	
France	6 February 2004	CD	Standard	EMI	
Australia	13 February 2004	CD	Standard	EMI	
Austria	20 February 2004	CD	Standard	EMI	
Germany	20 February 2004	CD	Standard	EMI	
Switzerland	20 February 2004	CD	Standard	EMI	
Brazil	12 March 2004	CD	Standard	EMI	
France	8 June 2004	CD + DVD	Limited	EMI	
