= Nous (Diane Birch EP) =

EP by Diane Birch
- Released: January 31, 2016
- Recorded: November–December 2015
- Genre: Jazz, indie pop, soul, gospel
- Length: 27:12
- Label: Hymnpatia Recordings
- Producer: Diane Birch

Diane Birch chronology
Speak a Little Louder (2013)	Nous (2016)

Nous (stylized N O U S) is an EP by singer-songwriter Diane Birch, her third EP released and her first independent release, released through bandcamp on January 31, 2016, and by iTunes on March 22, 2016. The album was written and recorded mostly in Berlin, recorded at Vox-Ton Studios, Joy Sound Studio, and Hympatia, mixed by Birch at Hymnpatia, and mastered by Nene Baratto at Big Snuff Studio in Berlin.

The album title is derived from a Greek word meaning "mind" or "intellect" but most commonly used as "common sense", "awareness", or "consciousness", and also "us" in French. Birch was drawn by the multifaceted nature of the word. The album deals with issues of love, power, gender, and loss, using hymns, moody soul, and RnB.

== Track listing ==
All tracks are written by Diane Birch.

No.	Title	Length
1.	"Hymn for Hypatia"	1:11
2.	"How Long"	4:29
3.	"King of Queens"	4:38
4.	"Interlude"	1:36
5.	"Stand Under My Love"	4:52
6.	"Walk on Water"	6:11
7.	"Woman"	4:15
Total length:		27:12

== Personnel ==
Musicians

- Diane Birch: vocals, piano, keyboards, programming
- Max Weissenfeldt: drums
- Stuart Matthewman: tenor saxophone
- Claudio Jolowicz: flute, tenor saxophone
- Fabian Engwicht: trumpet
- Yoed Nir: strings

Production

- Diane Birch: Producer, arranged by, engineer, mixed by
- Nene Baratto (at Big Snuff Studio): mixed by, mastered by
- Antonio Pulli (at Vox-Ton): recorded by, engineer
- Benjamin Spitzmüller (at Joy Sound Studio): recorded by, mixed by
- Meshakai Wolf: album photography and design
