= Willie Hale =

- Also known as: Little Beaver
- Born: Willie George Hale; August 15, 1945 (age 80); Forrest City, Arkansas, U.S.
- Genres: Soul; funk; R&B; blues
- Occupations: Guitarist; songwriter
- Instrument: Guitar
- Labels: Cat; TK; Soul Brother

Willie George Hale (born August 15, 1945), often known by the name Little Beaver, is an American guitarist, singer and songwriter, who has been featured on many hit records since the 1960s.

== Early life and session musicianship ==
Willie George Hale was born on August 15, 1945, in Forrest City, Arkansas, United States, and acquired the nickname "Little Beaver" as a child because of his prominent teeth. He became a virtuoso guitarist at an early age. In the early 1960s, he moved to Florida and in 1969 was signed by musician and songwriter Willie Clarke to the Cat label, an offshoot of Henry Stone’s TK Records, based in Hialeah, near Miami.

As a session musician, his characteristic guitar sound was soon heard on many hit TK recordings, including Betty Wright's "Clean Up Woman". (However, contrary to some sources, he did not play on George McCrae's "Rock Your Baby", which featured Jerome Smith of KC and the Sunshine Band).

== Solo recording career ==
He initially recorded three singles for Frank Williams' local Saadia label and one released on Philadelphia's Phil L.A. of Soul in the late 1960s, all produced by Williams and featuring his Rocketeers band.

Hale launched his TK solo career on Cat in 1972 with "Joey", produced by TK's senior producer, Steve Alaimo. His biggest hit came in 1974 with "Party Down", which made No. 2 on the US Billboard R&B chart. He released five albums as Little Beaver in the 1970s, a mixture of blues, soul and funk. However, he lost out commercially at the height of the disco boom. Many of his records featured other key Florida R&B musicians including Wright, pianist Benny Latimore, and organist Timmy Thomas. His 1974 album Party Down also featured, on one track, bassist Jaco Pastorius, credited as Nelson "Jocko" Padron. Reviewing the album in Christgau's Record Guide: Rock Albums of the Seventies (1981), Robert Christgau said: "The great T.K. guitarist (né Willie Hale) has a problem when he sings, which is that he can't. Ruined last year's blues album, but somehow it doesn't get in the way of this dance-groove item. The lyrics sound as if they were made up on the spot by somebody with a lot of common sense, and Beaver talks that talk as he goes about his work, which is seeing to the aforementioned groove."

Hale's recording career effectively ended in the early 1980s, with his seemingly final album in 1980 and the closure of TK Records, due to bankruptcy, a year later. Hale was recruited by Betty Wright in 2003 to play on Joss Stone's albums The Soul Sessions and Mind Body & Soul, and he released a new album in 2008 on the Henry Stone Music label, which also issued re-workings of his Cat recordings and re-issues of his 1970s albums.

== Legacy ==
Some of his tracks have been sampled by hip hop artists in recent years. The Los Angeles hip hop duo People Under the Stairs sampled "Get into the Party Life" and "I Can Dig It Baby," for two tracks on their 2002 album, O.S.T., and titled the songs "Suite for Beaver, Part 1" and "Suite for Beaver, Part 2," respectively, as a tribute. "Get into the Party Life" was also later sampled on Jay-Z’s track "Party Life" from his 2007 album American Gangster, and covered by Lion Babe on their 2019 album Cosmic Wind. Corona used "Get into the Party Life" in their 2020 commercial featuring Snoop Dogg. Kendrick Lamar later sampled "Give Me a Helping Hand" for track "peekaboo" on his 2024 album GNX.
