= Fell in Love with a Girl =

2002 single by the White Stripes

Single by the White Stripes

from the album White Blood Cells
- Released: January 21, 2002
- Recorded: February 2001
- Studio: Easley-McCain (Memphis, Tennessee)
- Genre: Alternative rock; garage punk
- Length: 1:50
- Label: XL; Third Man
- Composers: Jack White, Meg White
- Lyricist: Jack White
- Producer: Jack White

The White Stripes singles chronology
"Hotel Yorba" (2001)	"Fell in Love with a Girl" (2002)	"Dead Leaves and the Dirty Ground" (2002)

Music video
- "Fell in Love with a Girl" on YouTube

"Fell in Love with a Girl" is a song by the American rock duo the White Stripes and the fourth track on their third studio album, White Blood Cells (2001). It was released in January 2002 by XL Recordings. The lyrics were written by Jack White, and the music was composed by the band.

"Fell in Love with a Girl" was praised by critics for its upbeat sound and confidence. The song peaked at number 12 on the Alternative Airplay chart and number 21 on the UK singles chart, and was certified gold in the United Kingdom. Its success was bolstered by its music video, directed by Michel Gondry, which won three MTV Video Music Awards at the 2002 ceremony.

"Fell in Love with a Girl" helped the White Stripes enter the mainstream. It is considered a staple of the band's discography and a seminal work of the 2000s indie and garage rock movements. Artists who have covered or remixed the song include Richard Cheese, Joss Stone and "Weird Al" Yankovic, the second of these charting internationally.

== Recording ==
Prior to writing and composing "Fell in Love with a Girl", the White Stripes became prominent figures in the Detroit music scene. Jack and Meg White were married in 1996 and divorced in 2000, but Meg insisted that they continue working together. They then began work on White Blood Cells, their third studio album.

"Fell in Love with a Girl" was a new song written for the record, contrasting most of the other tracks written in the band's early years. It was recorded and mixed at Easley-McCain Recording in Memphis, Tennessee during the three production days of White Blood Cells; Meg was hesitant about the short recording time, believing the songs needed more practice.

== Composition ==
Fell in Love with a Girl
Sample of "Fell in Love with a Girl"

"Fell in Love with a Girl" is an alternative rock and garage punk styled song with an up-beat tempo that holds for a duration of one minute and fifty seconds. The song is written in a common time, time signature with a fast-paced tempo of 192 beats per minute. It is composed in the key of B major, while Jack's vocal range spans from a low of B_{3} to a high of A_{4}.

The song is built on a strummed rhythm guitar section groove played by Jack, backed by a high-speed, stuttering drum beat played by Meg with raucous crash cymbals and skipped snare drum patterns. It has a basic sequence of B–A–D–E during the introduction and verses and follows F♯–A–D–E–F♯–A–F♯ at the refrain as its chord progression.

"Fell in Love with a Girl" opens with Jack singing his lines with a manic vocal quality at loud volume, conveying visceral intensity and quirky, exaggerated inflections. His lyricism contains a dense slew of words laced with anxious banter and snappy humor. The musical arrangement comes to an abrupt pause at the last line of each verse. In substitution of a standard chorus, "Fell in Love with a Girl" features an infectious backing vocal line after each verse. Jack and Meg incessantly belt a wordless sing-along composed of "ah-ah-ah-ah" harmonizing.

== Release ==
White Blood Cells was released through the Sympathy for the Record Industry label in mid 2001, but "Fell in Love with a Girl" would not receive a single release until January 21, 2002, instead by XL Recordings. The track was reissued as a 7-inch vinyl record for Black Friday Record Store Day 2012 on opaque red vinyl by Third Man Records, and later issued on standard black vinyl.

== Reception ==
The record peaked at number 21 on both the US Billboard Bubbling Under Hot 100 Singles chart and the UK Singles Chart. It was also the band's first single to enter the US Modern Rock Tracks chart, peaking at number 12. "Fell in Love with a Girl" was met with widespread critical acclaim. Comparing it to that of the Ramones, Tom Maginnis from AllMusic called it "an attention-grabbing chunk of primal punk rock confection that flames out in a breathless one minute and 50 seconds. ... Surrendering is the only option; to fight against the infectious brutal and relentless energy of 'Fell in Love With a Girl' is an exercise in futility."

The May 3, 2007, issue of Rolling Stone magazine listed the song as one of the forty songs that changed the world. In 2011, NME placed it at number 6 on its list "150 Best Tracks of the Past 15 Years". The Times said that the track "mixes the blues with the Pixies." The Village Voice's "Pazz & Jop critics' poll named "Fell in Love with a Girl" the sixth-best song of 2002. Paste, The Guardian, and Stereogum ranked the song number six, number three, and number two, respectively, on their lists of the greatest White Stripes songs. Paste also included it on their list of "The 50 Best Garage Rock Songs of All Time". Staff at Billboard ranked it one of the best rock love songs.

== Music video ==
=== Background ===
The music video is a Lego animation directed by Michel Gondry. Gondry's son was featured at the beginning of the video, building Lego blocks. It was shot frame by frame with each frame having the Lego bricks rebuilt, sometimes in a complex manner to seem as if it were an actual shot, and then formed together to give the illusion of motion. The video mostly consists of red, white, and black color. The White Stripes couldn't strike a deal with Lego, so they had to buy a large amount of Lego boxes for the video.

In The Work of Director Michel Gondry interview, Jack also said that the White Stripes contacted the Lego Group in hopes of having a small Lego set packaged with each single of the record, with which one could build a LEGO version of Jack and Meg. The Lego Group refused, saying: "We don't market our product to people over the age of twelve."

=== Reception ===
The music video bolstered the success of the single, and received four nominations for Video of the Year, Breakthrough Video, Best Visual Effects, Best Editing at the 2002 MTV Video Music Awards, winning the latter three. Entertainment Weekly said that "the images enhance the lyrics...You can take the metaphor even deeper. As with Legos, love and sex can ultimately take whatever form your imagination desires." Entertainment Weekly included it on its end-of-the-decade, "best-of" list, saying, "An idea so simple it's a wonder no one thought of it before 2002: rock & roll Legos!" Pitchfork deemed it the best video of the decade.

== Track listings ==
UK CD single
No.	Title	Length
1.	"Fell in Love with a Girl"	1:50
2.	"Let's Shake Hands"	2:01
3.	"Lafayette Blues"	2:10

7-inch single
No.	Title	Length
1.	"Fell in Love with a Girl"	1:50
2.	"I Just Don't Know What to Do with Myself (Live at BBC Radio-1 Evening Session)"	2:46

== Personnel ==
Personnel are taken from the UK CD1 liner notes.

- Jack White – guitar, lead vocal
- Meg White – drums, cardboard box, backing vocal

== Charts ==
Chart (2002)	Peak position
Scottish Singles Sales (Official Charts)	38
UK Singles (Official Charts)	21
UK Indie (Official Charts)	2
US Bubbling Under Hot 100 (Billboard)	21
US Alternative Airplay (Billboard)	12

== Certifications and sales ==
Region	Certification	Certified units/sales
New Zealand (RMNZ)	Gold	15,000^{‡}
United Kingdom (BPI)	Gold	400,000^{‡}
^{‡} Sales+streaming figures based on certification alone.

== Release history ==
Region	Date	Format(s)	Label(s)	Ref(s).
Australia	January 21, 2002	7-inch vinyl; CD1	XL	
Australia	February 25, 2002	CD2	XL	
United Kingdom	February 25, 2002	7-inch vinyl; CD	XL	
New Zealand	May 27, 2002	CD	XL	

== Joss Stone version ==
"Fell in Love with a Boy"

Single by Joss Stone

from the album The Soul Sessions
- B-side: "Victim of a Foolish Heart" (live); "Super Duper Love (Are You Diggin' on Me?) Part 1"
- Released: January 12, 2004
- Recorded: May 5, 2003
- Studio: The Studio (Philadelphia, Pennsylvania)
- Length: 3:38
- Label: Relentless; Virgin; S-Curve
- Songwriter: Jack White
- Producers: Ahmir "Questlove" Thompson; Betty Wright; Steve Greenberg; Michael Mangini

Joss Stone singles chronology
"Fell in Love with a Boy" (2004)	"Super Duper Love" (2004)

=== Background ===
In 2003, English singer Joss Stone covered the song, retitled "Fell in Love with a Boy", for her debut studio album, The Soul Sessions (2003). It was released in the United States on January 12, 2004, as the album's lead single.

=== Reception ===
In the United Kingdom, a limited-edition 7-inch single and CD single were issued on January 26, 2004. "Fell in Love with a Boy" debuted and peaked at number 18 on the UK Singles Chart. The song also peaked at number 23 in New Zealand and number 36 in Italy.

The single received mostly positive reviews from critics. Dorian Lynskey of The Guardian raved that "Fell in Love with a Boy" is the best track from The Soul Sessions as well as "the freshest and most deliciously inauthentic." PopMatters reviewer Jason MacNeil commented that Stone gives the song "a groove-riddled, funky hip-shaker that never loses momentum." Rolling Stone said the tune sounded like "a lost Memphis-soul classic." However, Jim Greer of Entertainment Weekly viewed her version as "the only misguided ploy" on the album. Andrew McGregor wrote for BBC Music that it "blends so well into the funky soul landscape that those less familiar with contemporary rock might miss the ironic juxtaposition altogether."

=== Track listings ===
- UK and European CD single
1. "Fell in Love with a Boy" (radio version)
2. "Victim of a Foolish Heart" (live at Ronnie Scott's, London, November 25, 2003)
- UK limited-edition 7-inch single

A. "Fell in Love with a Boy" (album version)
B. "Super Duper Love (Are You Diggin' on Me?) Part 1"

- European maxi-CD single
1. "Fell in Love with a Boy" (radio version)
2. "Victim of a Foolish Heart" (live at Ronnie Scott's, London, November 25, 2003)
3. "Fell in Love with a Boy" (acoustic version)

=== Credits ===
Credits are adapted from the liner notes of The Soul Sessions.

Studios

- Recorded on May 5, 2003, at The Studio (Philadelphia, Pennsylvania)
- Mastered at Sterling Sound (New York City)

Personnel

- Jack White – writing
- Joss Stone – lead vocals
- Angie Stone – background vocals
- Betty Wright – background vocals, production
- Kirk Douglas – guitar
- Adam Blackstone – bass
- James Poyser – keyboards
- Kamal – keyboards
- Ahmir "Questlove" Thompson – drums, production
- Steve Greenberg – production
- Steve Greenwell – engineering, mixing
- Michael Mangini – production
- Chris Gehringer – mastering

=== Charts ===
Chart (2004)	Peak position
Belgium (Ultratip Bubbling Under Flanders)	16
Belgium (Ultratip Bubbling Under Wallonia)	17
Ireland (IRMA)	46
Italy (FIMI)	36
Netherlands (Dutch Top 40 Tipparade)	2
Netherlands (Single Top 100)	80
New Zealand (Recorded Music NZ)	23
Scottish Singles Sales (Official Charts)	18
UK Singles (Official Charts)	18
UK Hip Hop/R&B (Official Charts)	5
US Adult Alternative Airplay (Billboard)	16

=== Release history ===
Region	Date	Format(s)	Label(s)	Ref(s).
United States	January 12, 2004	Triple A radio	S-Curve	
United Kingdom	January 26, 2004	7-inch vinyl; CD	Relentless; Virgin	

== Covers and media ==
- The song was covered as a parody lounge song by Richard Cheese for their 2002 album Tuxicity.
- It was included on a polka medley by "Weird Al" Yankovic, "Angry White Boy Polka", from his 2003 album Poodle Hat.
- The Acoustic Album (2006, Virgin)
- The song was included in the 2009 play Punk Rock.
- The song was released as downloadable content for the music video game series Rock Band on March 9, 2010.
- American rock band of Montreal performed a version of the song in May 2011 for The A.V. Club's A.V. Undercover series.
- In the Academy Award-winning film Silver Linings Playbook, this song is incorporated into the dance routine that Pat (Bradley Cooper) and Tiffany (Jennifer Lawrence) perform at the dance competition.
- The song was used in a UK television advert for radio station BBC Radio 6 Music. The advert depicted the first dance at a wedding, with the DJ choosing to play The White Stripes as opposed to the chosen song, much to the consternation of the family.
- "Fell in Love with a Girl" was the final song played on the airwaves of the influential Providence, Rhode Island radio station WBRU on August 31, 2017. After the song played, the DJs signed off and the radio fell silent. WBRU now operates exclusively as an internet radio station.
- The song was in the last The Muppets episode "Because... Love"
