= Latimore (musician) =

American blues and R&B singer and songwriter (1939–2026)

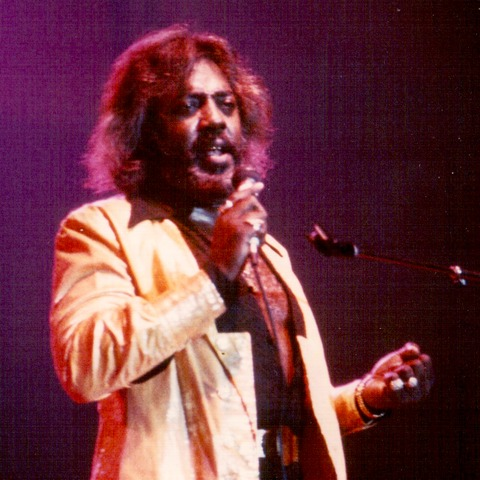
- Latimore in 1983

Background information
- Born: Benjamin William Lattimore; September 7, 1939; Charleston, Tennessee, U.S.
- Died: August 22, 2026 (aged 86) Florida, U.S.
- Genres: Blues; R&B; soul
- Occupations: Musician; songwriter
- Instruments: Vocals; piano
- Years active: 1965–2026
- Labels: Dade; Glades; Malaco

Benjamin William Lattimore (September 7, 1939 – August 22, 2026), known professionally as Latimore, was an American blues and R&B singer, songwriter, and pianist. In 2017, Latimore was inducted in to the Blues Hall of Fame.

== Life and career ==
Latimore was born in Charleston, Tennessee, on September 7, 1939, and was influenced by country music, his Baptist church choir, and the blues. His first professional experience came as a pianist for various Florida-based groups including Steve Alaimo. He first recorded around 1965 for Henry Stone's Dade record label in Miami, Florida. In the early 1970s, he moved to the Glades label, and had his first major hit in 1973 with a jazzy reworking of T-Bone Walker's "Stormy Monday", which reached No. 27 on the R&B chart.

His first national hit was "Stormy Monday," which reached #27 on the R&B chart in 1973. He followed it with "If You Were My Woman," a gender-modified cover of "If I Were Your Woman" (written by Pam Sawyer, Clay McMurray, and Gloria Jones and first popularized by Gladys Knight & the Pips), which reached No. 70 on the R&B chart. His biggest success came in 1974, with "Let's Straighten It Out", a No. 1 R&B hit, which also reached No. 31 on the U.S. Billboard Hot 100 chart. He followed it up with more hits, including "Keep The Home Fire Burnin'" (No. 5 R&B, 1975) and "Somethin' 'Bout 'Cha" (No. 7 R&B, 1976). His hits dissipated in the late 1970s.

"He likes what he's singing so much that he doesn't have to go for the simulated high emotion of some fancy vocal embellishment—he just puts those lyrics across, intelligent and matter-of-fact, as if you've never heard them before, which maybe you haven't."

— More More More Latimore review in Christgau's Record Guide: Rock Albums of the Seventies (1981)

Latimore moved to Malaco Records in 1982, releasing seven albums of modern blues music with that label. He briefly left the label in 1994 and released a song for the J-Town label, Turning Up The Mood, before returning to Malaco in 2000 with You're Welcome To Ride. Next, Latimore recorded an album with Mel Waiters' label, Brittney Records, called Latt Is Back.

Later, Latimore collaborated with Henry Stone on a new record label called LatStone; which released his first new album in six years, Back 'Atcha.

He continued to work as a session pianist. He appeared most recently on Joss Stone's albums, The Soul Sessions (2003) and Mind Body & Soul (2004), along with fellow Miami music veterans Betty Wright, Timmy Thomas, and Willie Hale, and made an appearance in May 2014 on The Tonight Show Starring Jimmy Fallon.

In 2017, Latimore was inducted in to the Blues Hall of Fame.

Latimore died on August 22, 2026, at the age of 86. His place of death is reported variously as Tampa or Riverview, Florida.

== Discography ==
=== Albums ===
1973 Latimore
1974 More, More, More Latimore, (Let's Straighten It Out) - Black Albums No. 13
1975 Latimore III - Black Albums No. 49
1976 It Ain't Where You Been...It's Where You're Goin' - Pop Albums No. 181, Black Albums No. 47
1978 Dig a Little Deeper - Black Albums No. 51
1980 Getting Down to Brass Tacks
1982 Singing in the Key of Love - Black Albums No. 61
1983 I'll Do Anything for You - Black Albums No. 66, Top R&B/Hip-Hop Albums No. 67
1985 Good Time Man
1986 Every Way But Wrong
1987 Slow Down
1991 The Only Way Is Up - Top R&B/Hip-Hop Albums No. 34
1993 Catchin' Up
1995 Best of Latimore: Sweet Vibrations
1995 Straighten It Out: The Best of Latimore
1996 Turnin' Up the Mood
1998 All You'll Ever Need
2000 You're Welcome to Ride
2003 Latt Is Back
2004 Sweet Vibrations: The Best of Latimore
2005 The Early Years
2007 Back 'Atcha
2009 All About the Rhythm and the Blues
2010 Live in Vienna
2011 Ladies Choice
2012 Henry Stones's Best Of: Latimore
2013 Latimore Remembers Ray Charles

=== Charted singles ===
1. 1973: "Stormy Monday" - Black Singles No. 27, Pop Singles No. 102
- 1974: "If You Were My Woman" - Black Singles No. 70
- 1974: "Let's Straighten It Out" - Black Singles No. 1, Pop Singles No. 31
- 1975: "Keep the Home Fire Burnin'" - Black Singles No. 5
- 1975: "There's a Red-Neck in the Soul Band" - Black Singles No. 36
- 1976: "Qualified Man" - Black Singles No. 43
- 1977: "I Get Lifted" - Black Singles No. 30
- 1977: "Let Me Live the Life I Love" - Black Singles No. 49
- 1977: "Somethin' 'Bout 'Cha" - Black Singles No. 7, Pop Singles No. 37
- 1979: "Dig a Little Deeper" - Black Singles No. 42
- 1979: "Goodbye Heartache" - Black Singles No. 82
- 1979: "Long Distance Love" - Black Singles No. 75
- 1980: "Discoed to Death" - Black Singles No. 68
- 1986: "Sunshine Lady" - Hot R&B/Hip-Hop Singles & Tracks No. 76
