= Michael Mangini =

Record producer

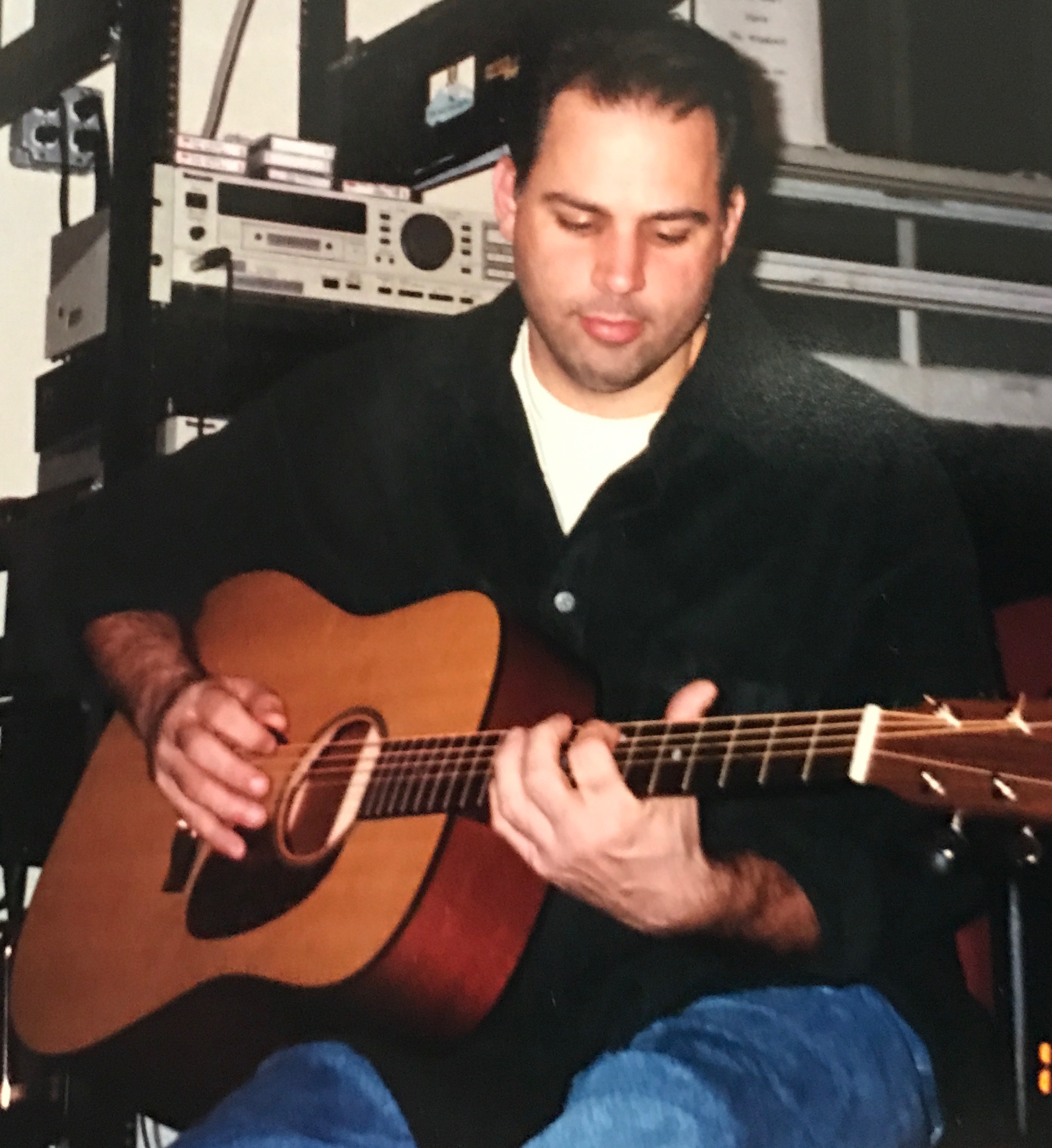
- Mangini in 2007

Background information
- Genres: Pop, soul, hip hop
- Occupations: Record producer, songwriter, engineer
- Years active: 1990–present
- Labels: Sony Music, Warner & BMG
- Website: officialmichaelmangini.com

Michael Mangini is an American record producer and owner of Mojo Music, a production and artist management company. He has worked with Digable Planets, Imani Coppola, and Baha Men, among others.

== Early life ==
Mangini started his career in the music industry in 1985 at studios in Baltimore, Maryland. He also started writing songs, singing, and playing guitar for the band China Blue. Mangini and the band relocated to Los Angeles to record songs at various studios, which is where he first learned music engineering and programming. He went from being an assistant at Chung King Studios to becoming a multi-Platinum award-winning mixing engineer within two years.

== Career ==
In early 1993, Mangini opened a studio in New Jersey and soon recorded, co-produced and mixed Digable Planets' Reachin' (A New Refutation of Time and Space) which included "Rebirth of Slick (Cool Like Dat)", winner of the Grammy Award for Best Rap Performance by a Duo or Group at the 36th Grammy Awards.

He co-produced Imani Coppola's Chupacabra released in 1997.

In 2000, along with Steve Greenberg, he produced the Baha Men’s single "Who Let the Dogs Out?". The song was recorded in Mangini home studio in Miami.

Mangini and Pop Rox's remix of the Marvin Gaye song "What's Going On" was included in the charity album of remixes released by Columbia Records in 2001. Also in 2001, Mangini produced O-Town's first full-length album O-Town and David Byrne's sixth solo album Look into the Eyeball. During this phase of his career, Mangini worked with musicians such as the Jonas Brothers, and Bruce Hornsby.

Mangini produced Joss Stone's first album The Soul Sessions, and its follow-up Mind Body & Soul.

Mangini has worked with various artists, including Little Jackie, Diane Birch, Hailey Knox and others. In 2016, along with Peter Zizzo, co-produced the Jackie Evancho song "Apocalypse". He also produced the 2018 debut album by Elise LeGrow, Playing Chess, a collection of covers of songs produced by the early record label Chess Records. In 2019, he produced Evancho's album The Debut.
