= S-Curve Records =

Record label

- Parent company: Disney Music Group (2021–present); BMG (pre-2015 catalog)
- Founded: 2000
- Founder: Steve Greenberg
- Distributors: Universal Music Group (physical); BMG Rights Management (digital) (pre-2015 catalog)
- Country of origin: United States
- Location: New York City

S-Curve Records is an American record label founded in 2000 by former Mercury Records executive Steve Greenberg. It is based in New York City. In 2001 the label established a distribution and licensing agreement with EMI Records. Among the hits released by S-Curve between 2000 and 2004 were "Who Let the Dogs Out?" by Baha Men, "Stacy's Mom" by Fountains of Wayne and Joss Stone's first two albums, the Soul Sessions and Mind Body & Soul. All of these artists received multiple Grammy nominations, with Baha Men winning the "Best Dance Recording" Grammy in 2001.

In 2007, Greenberg relaunched the label after a two-year hiatus, during which he served as President of Columbia Records. In 2010, the label's distribution deal with EMI came to an end and S-Curve entered into a new U.S. distribution deal, with Universal Music Group. From 2012 to 2015, Warner Music Group distributed the label outside of North America.

The S-Curve roster and catalog include titles by Tinted Windows.

The record label and publishing company were acquired by BMG Rights Management in November 2015, with Greenberg continuing at the helm. S-Curve continues to independently own stakes in its portfolio of tech companies.

In 2021, the label relaunched in a partnership with Disney Music Group. S-Curve's back catalog remains with BMG.

== See also ==
- Lists of record labels
