= Steve Greenberg (music producer) =

American record producer

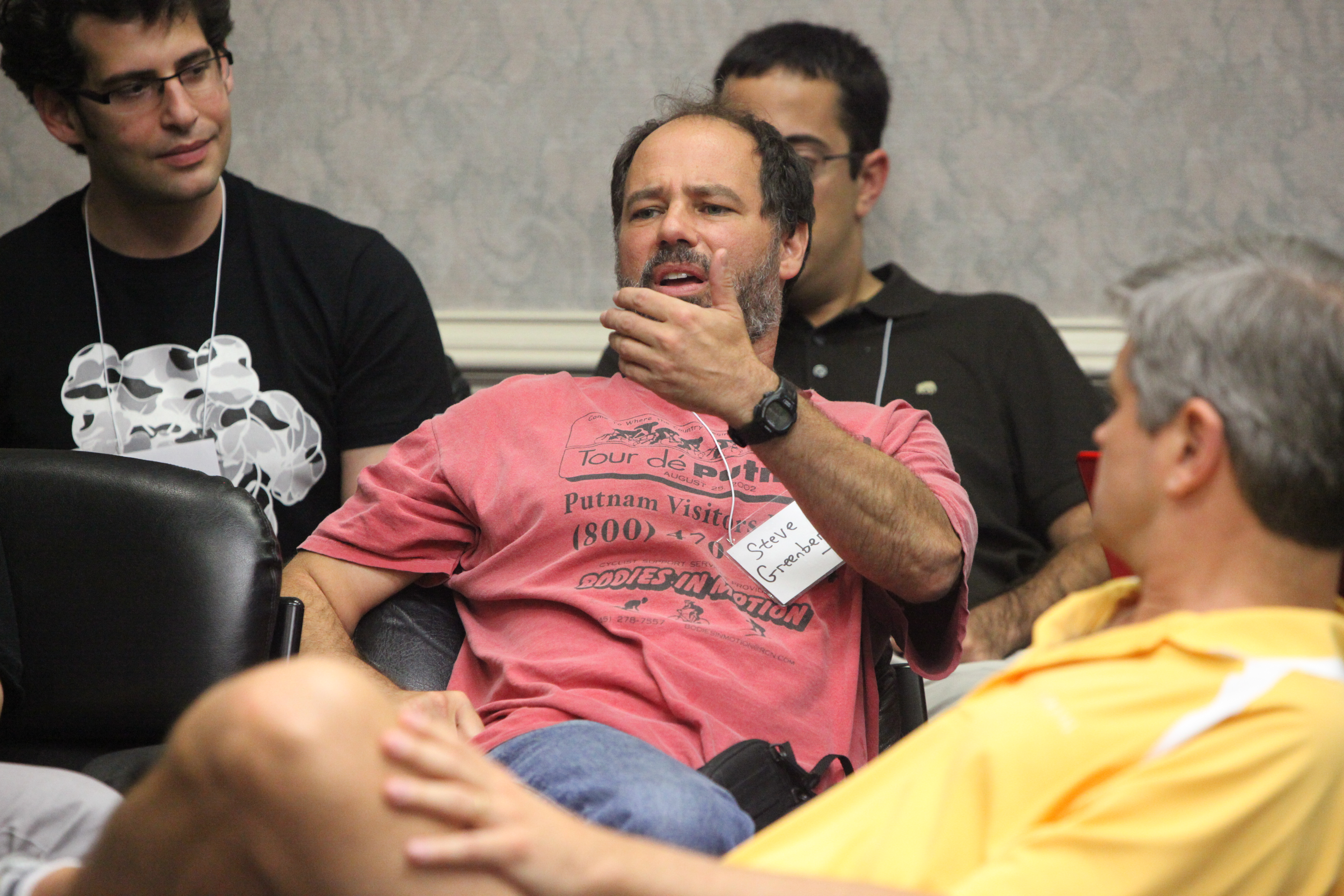
- Greenberg (center) speaking in 2009

Background information
- Born: United States
- Genres: Pop; rock; hip hop
- Occupations: Record producer; songwriter; music executive
- Label: S-Curve

Steve Greenberg is an American record producer currently heading the S-Curve Records label.

In 2020, he won the Grammy Award for "Best Album Notes" for Stax Records album, Stax ’68: A Memphis Story.
