= Scott Storch production discography =

The following list is a discography of production by Scott Storch, an American music producer. It includes songs produced, co-produced and remixed by year, artist, album and title.

== Singles produced ==
1999

- "You Got Me" (The Roots featuring Erykah Badu)
- "Still D.R.E." (Dr. Dre featuring Snoop Dogg) (credited as composer)

2000

- "X" (Xzibit featuring Snoop Dogg)

2002

- "Family Portrait" (Pink)
- "Fighter" (Christina Aguilera)
- "The Streets" (WC featuring Snoop Dogg and Nate Dogg)
- "Tarantula" (Mystikal featuring Butch Cassidy)

2003

- "Can't Hold Us Down" (Christina Aguilera featuring Lil' Kim)
- "Baby Boy" (Beyoncé featuring Sean Paul)
- "Clap Back" (Ja Rule)
- "Poppin' Them Thangs" (G-Unit)
- "Me, Myself And I" (Beyoncé)

2004

- "Naughty Girl" (Beyoncé)
- "Time's Up" (Jadakiss featuring Nate Dogg)
- "Giving It Up for Love'" (Britney Spears)
- "Let Me Love You" (Mario)
- "Lean Back" (Fat Joe featuring Remy Ma)
- "Don't Say Nuthin'" (The Roots)
- "Round and Round'" (Fabolous)

2005

- "U Make Me Wanna" (Jadakiss featuring Mariah Carey)
- "Candy Shop" (50 Cent featuring Olivia)
- "Just a Lil Bit" (50 Cent)
- "Playa's Only" (R. Kelly featuring The Game)
- "Get It Poppin'" (Fat Joe featuring Nelly)
- "Run It!" (Chris Brown featuring Juelz Santana)
- "Turn It Up" (Chamillionaire featuring Lil' Flip)
- "Lighters Up" (Lil' Kim)
- "Please" (Toni Braxton)
- "Gangsta Party" (Joe Budden featuring Nate Dogg)
- "I Don't Care" (Ricky Martin featuring Amerie & Fat Joe)
- "Chop Chop" (YoungBloodZ)
- "Conceited (There's Something About Remy)" (Remy Ma)

2006

- "I'll Hurt You" (Busta Rhymes featuring Eminem)
- "Lord Give Me a Sign" (DMX)
- "Why We Thugs" (Ice Cube)
- "About Us" (Brooke Hogan featuring Paul Wall)
- "Gimme That (Remix)" (Chris Brown featuring Lil Wayne)
- "I'm Good" (LeToya)
- "Make It Rain" (Fat Joe featuring Lil Wayne)
- "Let's Ride" (The Game)
- "You Ain't Know" (Birdman & Lil Wayne)
- "I Refuse" (Urban Mystic)
- "Turn It Up" (Paris Hilton)

2007

- "Lock U Down" (Mýa featuring Lil Wayne)
- "Impacto (Remix)" (Daddy Yankee featuring Fergie)
- "Magic City"(2XL featuring Cherish)

2008

- "Work" (Kelly Rowland)
- "Comeback" (Kelly Rowland) (promotional single)
- "Get Up" (50 Cent)

2009

- "Bingo" (Gucci Mane)

2010

- "Shutterbugg" (Big Boi)
- "Under Pressure" (Dr. Dre featuring Jay-Z)

2011

- "Boom" (Snoop Dogg featuring T-Pain)

2015

- "Brick Wall" (TAI & Scott Storch featuring Hell Yes)
- "Love in the 90z" (Mack Wilds)
- "Sorry" (Rick Ross featuring Chris Brown)
- "That Love" (Shaggy)
- "Wrong In The Right Way" (Chris Brown & Tyga)

2016

- "All Eyez" (The Game featuring Jeremih)

2017

- "Order of Operations" (Big Boi)
- "Drippin'" (Cymphonique)
- "Think Twice" (Russ)
- "Prosper" (Russ)
- "Maybe" (Russ)
- "Wife You Up" (Russ)
- "Unhappy" (A Boogie wit da Hoodie)
- "Supernova" (Ansel Elgort)
- "TR666" (Trippie Redd featuring Swae Lee)

2018

- "Back to Life" (Russ)
- "The Flute Song" (Russ)
- "My Tata" (Mike11 featuring Jeremih)
- "Vraiment Légendaire" (Les Anticipateurs)
- "Taking a Walk" (Trippie Redd)
- "Wraith" (T.I. featuring Yo Gotti)
- "Löwe" (Kollegah)
- "Kika" (6ix9ine featuring Tory Lanez)
- "Waka" (6ix9ine featuring A Boogie wit da Hoodie)
- "Wondo" (6ix9ine)
- "Down Below" (Roddy Ricch)
- "Attention" (Fat Joe)
- "The Big Pescado" (Berner)

2019

- "Undecided" (Chris Brown)
- "Zorra" (Bad Gyal)

2020

- "Fuego Del Calor" (Scott Storch featuring Ozuna & Tyga)
- "Do It" (Chloe x Halle)
- "Girls in the Hood" (Megan Thee Stallion)
- "King James" (R-Mean, Jeremih & Scott Storch)
- "Dirty Dancer" (Phi11a)
- "Tyler Herro" (Jack Harlow)
- "Feel Something" (The Kid Laroi featuring Marshmello)
- "Not So Different" (Ai)

2022

- "Parapariparo" (Stanley Enow)

== 1993 ==
=== The Roots – Organix ===
(All songs produced with Questlove & Black Thought)

- 07. "Grits"
- 08. "Leonard I-V"
- 09. "I'm Out Deah"
- 10. "Essawhamah? (Live at Soulshack)"
- 15. "The Session (The Longest Posse Cut in History)"
- 17. "Carryin' On"

== 1995 ==
=== The Roots – Do You Want More?!!!??! ===
- 02. "Proceed" (produced with The Grand Negaz)
- 04. "Mellow My Man" (produced with The Grand Negaz)
- 06. "Datskat" (produced with The Grand Negaz)
- 11. "Essaywhuman?!!!??!" (produced with Questlove & Black Thought)

== 1996 ==
=== The Roots – Illadelph Halflife ===
- 18. "One Shine" (produced with The Grand Negaz)

== 1997 ==
=== Of Age – Your Smile (CDS) ===
- 03. "Your Smile (Club Mix)"

== 1998 ==
=== Mondo Grosso – The Man from Sakura Hills ===
- 06. "Closer (The Roots Remix)" (produced with The Roots, Dave Ivory, Kenyatta Saunders, Melvin Lewis & Richard Nichols)

=== Nonchalant – Take It There (VLS) ===
- A1. "Take It There (Remix)" (feat. Lysette & The Roots) (produced with The Roots)

== 1999 ==
=== The Roots – Things Fall Apart ===
- 08. "Ain't Sayin' Nothin' New" (produced with The Grand Wizzards)
- 13. "Adrenaline!" (produced with The Grand Wizzards)
- 15. "You Got Me" (feat. Erykah Badu) (produced with The Grand Wizzards)

=== Rahzel – Make the Music 2000 ===
- 05. "Carbon Copy (I Can't Stop)"

=== Various artists – The Best Man: Music from the Motion Picture ===
- 01. "What You Want" (performed by The Roots feat. Jaguar Wright) (produced with The Grand Wizzards)

=== Jazzyfatnastees – The Once and Future ===
- 01. "The Wound"
- 02. "How Sad"
- 03. "Breakthrough"
- 04. "Unconventional Ways"
- 05. "Hear Me"
- 07. "Related to Me"
- 09. "Why"
- 10. "Let It Go"

=== Various artists – Music from and Inspired by the Motion Picture The Wood ===
- 03. "Ya' All Know Who!" (performed by The Roots) (produced with The Roots)

== 2000 ==
=== Dice Raw – Reclaiming the Dead ===
- 10. "If U Want It"
- 11. "Forget What They Say"

=== DJ Clue – Backstage the Mixtape ===
- 16. "Don't Want Beef" (performed by Capone-N-Noreaga)

=== Busta Rhymes – Anarchy ===
- 05. "Bladow!!"

=== Various artists – Nas & Ill Will Records Presents QB's Finest ===
- 08. "Our Way" (performed by Capone-N-Noreaga and Imam Thug)

=== Snoop Dogg – Tha Last Meal ===
- 13. "Brake Fluid (Biiitch Pump Yo Brakes)" (feat. Kokane)
- 14. "Ready 2 Ryde" (feat. Eve)
- 19. "Y'all Gone Miss Me" (feat. Kokane)

=== Xzibit – Restless ===
- 05. "X" (feat. Snoop Dogg) (produced with Dr. Dre and Mel-Man)

=== Jamie Hawkins – Lost My Mind (VLS) ===
- A1. "Lost My Mind (Remix Version)"

=== Lina – Playa No Mo (CDS) ===
- 03. "Playa No Mo (Scott Storch Remix)"

== 2001 ==
=== Eve – Scorpion ===
- 04. "Let Me Blow Ya Mind" (feat. Gwen Stefani) (produced with Dr. Dre)
- 10. "That's What It Is" (feat. Styles P) (produced with Dr. Dre)

=== Mobb Deep – Infamy ===
- 10. "Live Foul"
- 13. "I Won't Fall"
- 16. "There I Go Again"

=== Various artists – Violator: The Album, V2.0 ===
- 12. "Livin' the Life" (performed by Prodigy feat. Jadakiss & Butch Cassidy)
- 17. "Can't Get Enough" (performed by Rah Digga feat. Meka & Spliff Star)

=== Various artists – How High the Soundtrack ===
- 07. "Let's Do It" (performed by Method Man & Redman)

=== Mystikal – Tarantula ===
- 02. "Tarantula" (feat. Butch Cassidy)
- 09. "Alright"

=== The Roots – Glitches (The Skin You're In) (CDS) ===
- 01. "Glitches (The Skin You're In)" (feat. Amel Larrieux)

== 2002 ==
=== Angie Martinez – Animal House ===
- 02. "A New Day"

=== Rock – Walk Like a G (VLS) ===
- A1. "Walk Like a G" (feat. Nate Dogg)

=== Jazzyfatnastees – The Tortoise & the Hare ===
- 06. "Compelled" (produced with Ben Kenney, Richard Nichols and Tracey Moore)
- 07. "Tumbling" (produced with Mercedes Martinez and Richard Nichols)

=== Various artists – Music from the Motion Picture Soundtrack Brown Sugar ===
- 01. "Brown Sugar (Extra Sweet Remix)" (performed by Mos Def & Faith Evans)

=== Justin Timberlake – Justified ===
- 07. "Cry Me a River" (produced with Timbaland)
- 10. "(And She Said) Take Me Now" (feat. Janet Jackson) (produced with Timbaland)

=== Pink – Missundaztood ===
- 07. "Family Portrait"

=== Boyz II Men – Full Circle ===
- 08. "Roll With Me"

=== Uncle Kracker - Scooby-Doo (soundtrack) ===
- 06. "Freaks Come Out at Night" (feat. Busta Rhymes)

=== Slum Village – Trinity (Past, Present and Future) ===
- 20. "Get Live"

=== The Roots – Phrenology ===
- 12. "Pussy Galore" (produced with Zoukhan Bey)

=== Ras Kass – Goldyn Chyld (unreleased) ===
- 08. "FucQup"

=== Christina Aguilera – Stripped ===
- 02. "Can't Hold Us Down" (feat. Lil' Kim)
- 03. "Walk Away"
- 04. "Fighter"
- 05. "Primer Amor (Interlude)"
- 06. "Infatuation"
- 08. "Loving Me for Me"
- 10. "Underappreciated"
- 20. "Keep on Singing My Song"

=== Onyx – Bacdafucup: Part II ===
- 12. "Wet the Club"

=== WC – Ghetto Heisman ===
- 03. "The Streets" (feat. Nate Dogg and Snoop Dogg)

=== Truth Hurts – Truthfully Speaking ===
- 12. "Real" (produced with Timbaland & Static Major)

=== Jaguar Wright – Denials Delusions and Decisions ===
- 01. "The What If's"
- 04. "Love Need and Want You"
- 06. "Ain't Nobody Playin'"
- 09. "2 Too Many"

== 2003 ==
=== Dina Rae – The Dina Rae Show ===
- 12. "Can't Even C It"

=== Lil' Kim – La Bella Mafia ===
- 10. "(When Kim Say) Can You Hear Me Now" (feat. Missy Elliott)
- 11. "Thug Luv" (feat. Twista)

=== Britney Spears – Me Against the Music (CDS) ===
- 02. "Me Against the Music (Scott Storch Remix)" (feat. Madonna)

=== Ginuwine – The Senior ===
- 09. "Locked Down"
- 11. "Sex" (feat. Solé)
- 12. "Bedda Man"

=== Sticky Fingaz – Decade "...but wait it gets worse" ===
- 04. "Can't Call It"
- 05. "Hot Now"
- 12. "Do da Dam Thing" (feat. E.S.T. and X1)

=== K Young – K Young ===
- 03. "U R So Bad" (feat. Crooked I)

=== Beyoncé – Dangerously in Love ===
- 02. "Naughty Girl"
- 03. "Baby Boy" (feat. Sean Paul)
- 05. "Me, Myself and I"

=== Sarai – The Original ===
- 02. "I Know"
- 09. "You Could Never"
- 10. "L.I.F.E."
- 13. "Black & White"

=== Nelly – Da Derrty Versions: The Reinvention ===
- 13. "Work It (Scott Storch Remix)" (feat. Justin Timberlake)

=== Ja Rule – Blood in My Eye ===
- 03. "Clap Back" (co-produced by Irv Gotti)

=== Dream – Reality ===
- 04. "Crazy" (feat. Loon)

=== Loon – Loon ===
- 17. "U Don't Know"

=== G-Unit – Beg for Mercy ===
- 02. "Poppin' Them Thangs" (produced with Dr. Dre)

=== Memphis Bleek – M.A.D.E. ===
- 05. "We Ballin'" (feat. Young Chris & Livin Proof)
- 11. "Murda Murda" (feat. Jay-Z & Beanie Sigel)

=== Vivian Green – Fanatic (VLS) ===
- A1. "Fanatic (Scott Storch Remix)"

=== Nate Dogg – Nate Dogg (unreleased) ===
- 06. "Hide It" (feat. Armed Robbery)

== 2004 ==
=== Young Gunz – Tough Luv ===
- 06. "Never Take Me Alive" (feat. Jay-Z)

=== Janet Jackson – Damita Jo ===
- 09. "Island Life" (produced with Janet Jackson and Jimmy Jam and Terry Lewis)

=== Jadakiss – Kiss of Death ===
- 05. "Time's Up" (feat. Nate Dogg)
- 07. "U Make Me Wanna" (feat. Mariah Carey)

=== Terror Squad – True Story ===
- 04. "Lean Back"

=== The Roots – The Tipping Point ===
- 03. "Don't Say Nuthin'"
- 09. "Duck Down!"

=== Fabolous – Real Talk ===
- 15. "Round and Round"
- 17. "Ghetto" (feat. Thara)

=== Destiny's Child – Destiny Fulfilled (bonus disc) ===
- 2-01. "My Man"
- 2-02. "2 Step"

=== Dina Rae – And? (VLS) ===
- A1. "And?"
- B3. "Round Here"

=== Mario – Turning Point ===
- 02. "Let Me Love You"
- 07. "Call the Cops" (produced with Robert Waller)
- 13. "Let Me Love You (Remix)" (feat. T.I. and Jadakiss)

=== Trick Daddy – Thug Matrimony: Married to the Streets ===
- 14. "I Cry" (feat. Ron Isley)

=== Petey Pablo – Still Writing in My Diary: 2nd Entry ===
- 08. "Get on Dis Motorcycle" (feat. Bubba Sparxxx) (produced with Timbaland)

=== Knoc-turn'al – The Way I Am ===
- 04. "The Way I Am" (feat. Snoop Dogg)

=== 2Pac – Loyal to the Game ===
- 14. "Po Nigga Blues (Scott Storch Remix)" (feat. Ron Isley)

=== Raven-Symoné – This Is My Time ===
- 02. "Backflip"

=== T.I. – Urban Legend ===
- 10. "Get Ya Shit Together" (feat. Lil' Kim)
- 15. "Chillin' with My Bitch" (feat. Jazze Pha)

=== Sly Boogy – That'z My Name (CDS) ===
- 01. "That'z My Name"

=== Rah Digga - Everything Is a Story (unreleased) ===
- 13. "The Way We"
- 18. "Everything Is a Story"
- 20. "Everything Is a Story (Alternate Ending)"

== 2005 ==
=== Ruff Ryders – The Redemption Vol. 4 ===
- 10. "Get Wild" (feat. DMX, Jadakiss, Kartoon & Flashy)

=== The Notorious B.I.G. – Duets: The Final Chapter ===
- 16. "Ultimate Rush" (feat. Missy Elliott)

=== Do or Die – D.O.D. ===
- 05. "U Already Know" (feat. Remy Ma)

=== Destiny's Child – Cater 2 U (CDS) ===
- 02. "Cater 2 U (Storch Remix Edit)"

=== The Game – The Documentary ===
- 02. "Westside Story" (feat. 50 Cent) (produced with Dr. Dre)
- 10. "Start from Scratch" (produced with Dr. Dre)

=== Benzino – Arch Nemesis ===
- 04. "Bottles and Up (Thug da Club)"

=== 50 Cent – The Massacre ===
- 07. "Candy Shop" (feat. Olivia)
- 14. "Just a Lil Bit"
- 18. "Build You Up" (feat. Jamie Foxx)

=== Corey Clark – Corey Clark ===
- 03. "Out of Control"

=== Vivian Green – Vivian ===
- 01. "I Wish We Could Go Back"
- 02. "Mad"

=== Fat Joe – All or Nothing ===
- 08. "Get It Poppin'" (feat. Nelly)

=== R. Kelly – TP.3 Reloaded ===
- 01. "Playa's Only" (feat. The Game) (produced with R. Kelly)

=== Missy Elliott – The Cookbook ===
- 05. "Meltdown"

=== Heather Hunter – Double H: The Unexpected ===
- 05. "Don't Stop" (feat. E.S.T.)

=== Trey Songz – I Gotta Make It ===
- 06. "All the Ifs"

=== Cuban Link - Man On Fire: The Mixtape ===
- 25. "Let Me Love You" (Remix) (featuring Mario)

=== Shaggy – Clothes Drop ===
- 14. "Don't Ask Her That" (feat. Nicole Scherzinger)

=== Toni Braxton – Libra ===
- 01. "Please"

=== Mariah Carey – It's Like That Remix (VLS) ===
- B1. "It's Like That (Remix)" (feat. Fat Joe)

=== Lil' Kim – The Naked Truth ===
- 03. "Lighters Up"

=== Ricky Martin – Life ===
- 02. "I Don't Care" (feat. Amerie & Fat Joe)
- 09. "This Is Good" (produced with The Matrix, Danny López and Ricky Martin)

=== Twista – The Day After ===
- 04. "Get It How You Live"

=== Chris Brown – Chris Brown ===
- 02. "Run It!" (feat. Juelz Santana)
- 05. "Gimme That"

=== Chamillionaire – The Sound of Revenge ===
- 03. "Turn It Up" (feat. Lil' Flip)

=== Jessica Simpson – These Boots Are Made for Walkin' (VLS) ===
- B1. "These Boots Are Made for Walkin' (Scott Storch Remix)"

=== YoungBloodZ – Ev'rybody Know Me ===
- 02. "Chop Chop"

=== Jaguar Wright – Divorcing Neo 2 Marry Soul ===
- 10. "So High"

== 2006 ==
=== Remy Ma – There's Something About Remy: Based on a True Story ===
- 07. "Conceited (There's Something About Remy)"

=== Jaheim – Ghetto Classics ===
- 04. "Forgetful"

=== Juvenile – Reality Check ===
- 04. "Sets Go Up" (feat. Wacko)
- 19. "Say It to Me Now" (feat. Kango of Partners-N-Crime)

=== Lil' Flip – I Need Mine ===
- 2-07. "Tell Me" (feat. Collie Buddz)

=== LL Cool J – Todd Smith ===
- 09. "Ooh Wee" (feat. Ginuwine)

=== Yo Gotti – Back 2 da Basics ===
- 09. "That's What They Made It Foe" (feat. Pooh Bear)

=== Ice Cube – Laugh Now, Cry Later ===
- 02. "Why We Thugs"
- 17. "Steal the Show"

=== MC Hammer – Look Look Look ===
- 04. "HammerTime (feat. Nox)"
- 05. "Doing da Thizz"
- 06. "Look Look Look"

=== Jurassic 5 – Feedback ===
- 03. "Brown Girl" (feat. Brick & Lace)

=== LeToya – LeToya ===
- 12. "I'm Good"

=== DMX – Year of the Dog...Again ===
- 09. Give 'Em What They Want
- 15. "Lord Give Me a Sign"

=== Paris Hilton – Paris ===
- 01. "Turn It Up"
- 02. "Fighting Over Me" (feat. Fat Joe and Jadakiss)
- 05. "Jealousy"
- 06. "Heartbeat"
- 08. "Screwed"
- 10. "Turn You On"
- 11. "Do You Think I'm Sexy"

=== Danity Kane – Danity Kane ===
- 15. "Sleep on It"

=== Kelis – Kelis Was Here ===
- 08. "Trilogy"

=== Beenie Man – Undisputed ===
- 05. "Dutty Wine Gal" (feat. Brooke Valentine)
- 06. "Jamaican Ting"

=== Method Man – 4:21... The Day After ===
- 02. "Is It Me"

=== Jessica Simpson – A Public Affair ===
- 12. "Fired Up"

=== Governor – Son of Pain ===
- 05. "Destiny"

=== Daz Dillinger – So So Gangsta ===
- 07. "Money on My Mind" (feat. Kurupt)

=== Ludacris – Release Therapy ===
- 15. "We Ain't Worried 'Bout U" (iTunes bonus track)

=== Mario Vazquez – Mario Vazquez ===
- 03. "Cohiba" (feat. Fat Joe & Nox)

=== JoJo – The High Road ===
- 01. "This Time"

=== Ruben Studdard – The Return ===
- 07. "What tha Business Is"

=== Brooke Hogan – Undiscovered ===
- 01. "About Us" (feat. Paul Wall)
- 02. "Heaven Baby" (feat. Beenie Man)
- 03. "Next Time"
- 04. "For a Moment"
- 05. "My Space"
- 06. "All About Me"
- 07. "My Number" (feat. Stacks)
- 09. "One Sided"
- 10. "Letting Go"
- 11. "Dance Alone" (feat. Nox)
- 12. "Beautiful Transformation"

=== Birdman & Lil Wayne – Like Father, Like Son ===
- 06. "You Ain't Know"

=== Fat Joe – Me, Myself & I ===
- 07. "Make It Rain" (feat. Lil Wayne)
- 09. "Think About It"

=== The Game – Doctor's Advocate ===
- 06. "Let's Ride"
- 07. "Too Much" (feat. Nate Dogg)

=== Tyrese – Alter Ego ===
- 04. "Get It In" (feat. Method Man)

=== Nas – Hip Hop Is Dead ===
- 03. "Carry on Tradition"
- 13. "Play on Playa" (feat. Snoop Dogg)

=== Styles P – Time Is Money ===
- 04. "Real Shit" (feat. Gerald Levert)

=== Urban Mystic – Ghetto Revelations II ===
- 04. "Can U Handle It?" (feat. Pitbull)
- 05. "Bounce wit' Me" (feat. Stack$)
- 06. "I Refuse"
- 07. "Your Portrait"

=== Busta Rhymes – I'll Hurt You (digital single) ===
- 01. "I'll Hurt You" (feat. Eminem) (produced with Dr. Dre)

=== Joe Budden – Mood Muzik 2: Can It Get Any Worse? ===
- 16. "Three Sides to a Story"

== 2007 ==
=== 2XL – Neighborhood Rapstar ===
- 08. "Magic City" (feat. Cherish)

=== Benzino – The Antidote ===
- 15. "Zexxxy"

=== Bishop Lamont – Pope Mobile ===
- 09. "All I Dream About" (feat. Pooh Bear)
- 10. "Sumthin'"
- 13. "Music Shit"
- 14. "Sometimez" (feat. Mike Ant & Chevy Jones)

=== Chris Brown – Exclusive ===
- 15. "Nice" (feat. The Game)

=== DJ Cynik – Anything But ===
- 02. "Get In Get Out"

=== Bishop Lamont & DJ Skee – Nigger Noize ===
- 05. "The Truth" (feat. Stacee Adams)

=== Jill Scott – The Real Thing: Words and Sounds Vol. 3 ===
- 06. "Epiphany"

=== Kelly Rowland – Ms. Kelly ===
- 02. "Comeback"
- 04. "Work"

=== Keyshia Cole – Just like You ===
- 04. "Give Me More"

=== Mýa – Liberation ===
- 04. "Still a Woman"
- 06. "Lock U Down" (feat. Lil Wayne)

=== The Mossie − Soil Savvy ===
- 03. "Hustlinaire" (feat. Jay Tee)

=== Luc Duc – Amerikkkan Addiction! ===
- 03. "PG-21"

=== Daddy Yankee – El Cartel: The Big Boss ===
- 05. "Impacto"
- 07. "A Lo Clasico"
- 13. "Que Paso!"
- 21. "Impacto (Remix)" (feat. Fergie)

== 2008 ==
=== Bishop Lamont – The Confessional ===
- 09. "Right"

=== Re-Up Gang – Clipse Presents: Re-Up Gang ===
- 04. "Fast Life"

=== Fat Joe – The Elephant in the Room ===
- 10. "Preacher on a Sunday Morning" (feat. Pooh Bear)

=== Mariah Carey – E=MC² ===
- 12. "Side Effects" (feat. Young Jeezy)

=== Bun B – II Trill ===
- 05. "I Luv That"

=== Lil Mama – VYP (Voice of the Young People) ===
- 18. "Pick It Up"

=== Ali Vegas – Leader of the New School ===
- 03. "That's Nothing"

=== KeAnthony – A Hustlaz Story ===
- 01. "Down Girl"

=== The Game – LAX ===
- 12. "Let Us Live" (feat. Chrisette Michele)

=== 50 Cent – Get Up (digital single) ===
- 01. "Get Up"

=== Ludacris – Theater of the Mind ===
- 10. "Contagious" (feat. Jamie Foxx)

=== Eva – In the Beginning ===
- 01. "Slow Down" (feat. Lupe Fiasco)
- 02. "Fashion Show"
- 03. "Catch Me Later"

=== Raheem DeVaughn – Love Behind the Melody ===
- 03. "Love Drug"
- 04. "Energy" (feat. Big Boi)

=== Stacks – Crazee & Confuzed ===
- 04. "That's the Way" (feat. Fat Joe & Trina)
- 05. "I'm Addicted"
- 06. "Git It, Git It" (feat. Twista)
- 07. "Crazee & Confuzed"
- 08. "Bulletproof" (feat. Beenie Man)

== 2009 ==
=== Gucci Mane – The State vs. Radric Davis ===
- 07. "Bingo" (feat. Soulja Boy & Waka Flocka Flame)

=== Chris Brown – Graffiti ===
- 19. "Brown Skin Girl" (feat. Sean Paul & Rock City) (bonus track)

=== Bone Thugs-n-Harmony – The Book of Thugs ===
- 06. "Nuff Respect"

=== Urban Mystic – GRIII: Old School 2 Nu Skool ===
- 06. "So Fly" (feat. Beenie Man & Ce'cile)

=== Nu Jerzey Devil – Art of the Devil ===
- 16. "That's Me" (feat. Urban Mystic)

=== Mams Taylor – King Amongst Man: The Lost Album ===
- 05. "Girl Like This" (feat. Rico Love)
- 12. "London Lingo"

=== Mams Taylor – Persona Non Grata (Un-wel-come Per-son) ===
- 09. "Get Down"

=== Breje – Glad We Met (CDS) ===
- 01. "Glad We Met"

=== Nipsey Hussle – Bullets Ain't Got No Name, Vol. 3.1 ===
- 13. "Good for Me"

=== C-Ride – Automatic Vibe ===
- 04. "Real Nigga 24" (feat. Rick Ross)

=== Chali 2na – Fish Outta Water ===
- 09. "Love's Gonna Getcha"

=== Phyllisia – Sunshine (CDS) ===
- 02. "Sunshine" (feat. Ne-Yo & Flo Rida)

=== N.O.R.E. – S.O.R.E. ===
- 04. "My Girl Gangsta" (feat. T-Pain)

=== Frankie Goes to Hollywood – Frankie Say Greatest ===
- 2-07. "Relax (Scott Storch Mix)"

=== B.G. – Too Hood 2 Be Hollywood ===
- 16. "4 a Minute" (feat. T.I.)

=== Mike Epps – Funny Bidness: Da Album ===
- 03. "The Bitch Won't Leave Me Alone"
- 04. "Trying to Be a Gangsta" (feat. Pooh Bear)

== 2010 ==
=== Chali 2na – Fish Market Part 2 ===
- 09. "Step Yo Game Up"

=== Big Boi – Sir Lucious Left Foot: The Son of Chico Dusty ===
- 05. "Shutterbugg" (feat. Cutty) (produced with Big Boi)

=== Quietus Khan – Patience ===
- 05. "The South"
- 10. "Good Part"
- 12. "It's Alright"
- 13. "Da Beat"

=== Quincy Jones – Q Soul Bossa Nostra ===
- 06. "You Put a Move on My Heart" (feat. Jennifer Hudson) (produced with Quincy Jones & Harvey Mason Jr.)

=== DoItAll – American Du ===
- 06. "We're a Different Kind" (feat. Keish Shontelle & Mike Biv)

== 2011 ==
=== Snoop Dogg – Doggumentary ===
- 09. "Boom" (feat. T-Pain)

== 2012 ==
=== Saigon – Warning Shots 3: One Foot in the Grave ===
- 17. "Where to Find Me" (feat. Quan)

== 2013 ==
=== Mike Stud – Dreamin' (digital single) ===
- 01. "Dreamin'"

=== Stacks – The Snowball Effect ===
- 12. "Getaway'" (feat. Nelly Furtado)

=== Meek Mill – Dreamchasers 3 ===
- 11. "Fuckin wit Me" (feat. Tory Lanez) (produced with The Mekanics)

=== Frank Lee White – My Life ===
- 09. "G.A."

== 2014 ==
=== Rick Ross – Mastermind ===
- 10. "Supreme" (produced with Puff Daddy)

=== Vado – Sinatra ===
- 03. "Look Me in My Eyes" (feat. Rick Ross & French Montana)

=== Snoop Dogg – That's My Work 3 ===
- 19. "Happy Birthday Pt. 2" (feat. Poo Bear)

=== Uncle Murda & GMG – Ain't Nothing Sweet ===
- 03. "Rolling"

=== Chris Webby – Chemically Imbalanced ===
- 03. "Set It Off"
- 10. "Chemically Imbalanced"

=== Erika Jayne – Crazy (digital single) ===
- 01. "Crazy" (feat. Maino)

== 2015 ==
=== Timati & Subliminal – Get Money (digital single) ===
- 01. "Get Money"

=== Chris Brown & Tyga – Fan of a Fan: The Album ===
- 13. "Wrong in the Right Way" (produced with The Mekanics)

=== Mario – Never 2 Late (unreleased) ===
- 02. "It's a Crime"
- 03. "Forever" (feat. Rick Ross)
- 04. "Sink or Swim"
- 05. "Show You Off"
- 06. "Vegas"
- 07. "Saturday Night"
- 08. "Enemy"
- 09. "Never However"
- 10. "Forever"
- 12. "Favorite"
- 13. "Birthday"
- 14. "Beautiful Angel"
- 15. "Never Surrender"

=== Rick Ross – Black Market ===
- 13. "Sorry" (feat. Chris Brown) (produced with Diego Ave)

=== DJ Khaled – I Changed a Lot ===
- 08. "Every Time We Come Around" (feat. French Montana, Jadakiss, Ace Hood & Vado) (produced with The Mekanics)

=== Chris Brown – Royalty International – EP ===
- 02. "Shattered" (produced with Diego Ave)

=== Shaggy – That Love (digital single) ===
- 01. "That Love" (produced with Diego Ave)

=== Mack Wilds – Love in the 90z (digital single) ===
- 01. "Love in the 90z" (produced with Salaam Remi, Teddy Riley & James Poyser)

=== TAI & Scott Storch – Brick Wall (digital single) ===
- 01. "Brick Wall" (feat. Hell Yes) (produced with TAI & David Rubert)

== 2016 ==
=== PnB Rock & Fetty Wap – Money, Hoes, and Flows ===
- 06. "Hood Rich"

=== The Game – 1992 ===
- 13. "All Eyez" (feat. Jeremih) (produced with Diego Ave)

== 2017 ==
=== Big Boi – Boomiverse ===
- 05. "Order of Operations" (produced with Diego Ave)

=== Young Thug – Beautiful Thugger Girls ===
- 04. "Daddy's Birthday" (produced with London on da Track)

=== Bone Thugs – New Waves ===
- 07. "Waves" (feat. Layzie Bone, Wish Bone & Flesh-n-Bone)

=== French Montana – Jungle Rules ===
- 12. "Stop It" (feat. T.I.) (produced with Diego Ave)

=== Stevie Stone – Level Up ===
- 02. "Whippin' Up" (feat. DB Bantino) (produced with Diego Ave)
- 04. "Crushin'" (feat. DB Bantino) (produced with Diego Ave)

=== A Boogie wit da Hoodie – The Bigger Artist ===
- 06. "Unhappy" (produced with Diego Ave)

=== Blac Youngsta – 2.23 ===
- 08. "Right There" (feat. French Montana) (produced with Murda Beatz)
- 13. "Drop Yo Flag"

=== Chris Brown – Heartbreak on a Full Moon ===
- 2-13. "Enemy" (produced with Diego Ave)

=== Casanova – Commissary ===
- 07. "Left Right" (feat. Chris Brown & Fabolous)

== 2018 ==
=== Berner – The Big Pescado ===
- 01. "Intro"
- 02. "G.R.E.E.D."
- 03. "Pressure"
- 04. "Wait for It" (feat. The Game)
- 05. "Loose Lips" (feat. Conway the Machine, Fresh & Pusha T)
- 06. "Noid" (feat. Devin the Dude & Snoop Dogg)
- 07. "Gettin It" (feat. Fresh)
- 08. "Play Your Roll" (feat. Ty Dolla Sign)
- 09. "Flex"
- 10. "Busy Body" (feat. E-40, TeeFlii & Too Short)
- 11. "Last Year" (feat. Trey Songz & Wiz Khalifa)
- 12. "Big Bags"
- 13. "Check" (feat. Shy Glizzy)
- 14. "Guess Who" (feat. Jeremih)
- 15. "Blind to the Bullsh*t"
- 16. "Outro"

=== Maluma – F.A.M.E. ===
- 07. "How I Like It" (produced with Diego Ave & Angel Lopez)

=== Post Malone – Beerbongs & Bentleys ===
- 04. "Zack & Codeine" (produced with Diego Ave, RoccStar & Tariq Bright)

=== Trippie Redd – Life's a Trip ===
- 02. "Taking a Walk" (produced with Avedon)

=== Russ – Zoo ===
- 01. "The Flute Song" (produced with Avedon)

=== T.I. – Dime Trap ===
- 03. "Wraith" (feat. Yo Gotti) (produced with Avedon)

=== Yella Beezy – Ain't No Goin' Bacc ===
- 19. "Play Yo Part" (produced with Avedon)

=== 6ix9ine – Dummy Boy ===
- 04. "Kika" (feat. Tory Lanez) (produced with Avedon)
- 06. "Waka" (feat. A Boogie wit da Hoodie) (produced with Avedon & J Gramm)
- 12. "Wondo" (produced with Avedon)

=== Kollegah – Monument ===
- 09. "Löwe"

=== Cymphonique – No Days Off ===
- 02. "Drippin'"

=== Armin van Buuren – Balance ===
- 12. "Sex, Love & Water" (feat. Conrad Sewell) (produced with Armin van Buuren & Angel Lopez)

=== Les Anticipateurs – Bateaux Colombiens ===
- 04. "Vraiment Légendaire"

=== Fat Joe & Dre – Attention (digital single) ===
- 01. "Attention" (feat. Chris Brown)

=== Mike11 – My Tata (digital single) ===
- 01. "My Tata" (feat. Jeremih)

== 2019 ==
=== Killy – Light Path 8 ===
- 04. "Eye for an Eye" (produced with Avedon)

=== Chris Brown – Indigo ===
- 01. "Indigo" (produced with OG Parker, Romano & Soundz)
- 05. "Emerald" (feat. Juicy J and Juvenile) (produced with The Rascals & Soundz)
- 20. "Undecided" (produced with Avedon)
- 28. "Early 2k" (feat. Tank) (produced with Avedon)

=== Phora – Bury Me with Dead Roses ===
- 05. "Blame on Me"

=== Blueface – Dirt Bag ===
- 05. "Bussin" (feat. Lil Pump) (produced with Mike Crook)

=== Summer Walker – Over It ===
- 14. "Anna Mae" (produced with London on da Track & Kendall Bailey)
- 15. "I'll Kill You" (feat. Jhené Aiko) (produced with London on da Track, Kendall Bailey & Aubrey Robinson)

=== Berner – La Plaza ===
- 07. "Going Out Like That" (feat. Fat Joe and De La Ghetto)

=== Bad Gyal – Zorra (digital single) ===
- 01. "Zorra" (produced with SickDrumz)

== 2020 ==
=== Russ – Shake the Snow Globe (Deluxe) ===
- 01. "3am" (feat. Ty Dolla Sign) (produced with Avedon)

=== Chloe x Halle – Ungodly Hour ===
- 04. "Do It" (produced with Chloe Bailey, Avedon & Asoteric)
- 10. "Lonely" (produced with Chloe x Halle & Avedon)

=== Tee Grizzley – The Smartest ===
- 08. "Picture of My City" (produced with Diego Ave)

=== Tee Grizzley – I Spy (digital single) ===
- 01. "I Spy" (produced with Diego Ave)

=== The Lox – Living Off Xperience ===
- 02. "Move" (produced with Avedon)
- 07. "Do to Me" (feat. Jeremih) (produced with The Rascals)

=== Aluna – Renaissance ===
- 13. "Surrender" (produced with SickDrumz)

=== Luh Kel – L.O.V.E. ===
- 03. "Real" (produced with Illa da Producer)

=== Trippie Redd – Pegasus ===
- 25. "TR666" (feat. Swae Lee) (produced with Avedon)

=== Ariana Grande – Positions ===
- 08. "My Hair" (produced with Tommy Brown, Anthony M. Jones & Charles Anderson)

=== Dave East – Karma 3 (Deluxe) ===
- 17. "One in the Sky" (produced with Illa da Producer)

=== Ayanis – YANI ===
- 02. "That's Real" (feat. A Boogie wit da Hoodie)

=== The Kid Laroi – F*ck Love (Savage) ===
- 05. "Feel Something" (feat. Marshmello) (produced with Marshmello & Illa da Producer)

=== Megan Thee Stallion – Good News ===
- 16. "Girls in the Hood" (produced with Illa da Producer)

=== Jack Harlow – Thats What They All Say ===
- 11. "Tyler Herro" (produced with Boi-1da)

=== Scott Storch – Fuego Del Calor (digital single) ===
- 01. "Fuego Del Calor" (feat. Ozuna & Tyga)

=== Phi11a – Dirty Dancer (digital single) ===
- 01. "Dirty Dancer" (produced with Avedon)

=== R-Mean, Jeremih & Scott Storch – King James (digital single) ===
- 01. "King James"

== 2021 ==
=== Ai – It's All Me, Vol. 2 ===
- 01. "Not So Different" (produced with Uemura & Avedon)
- 06. "Not So Different (Remix)" (feat. Awich) (produced with Uemura & Avedon)

=== Bad Gyal – Warm Up ===
- 08. "Zorra (Remix)" (feat. Rauw Alejandro) (produced with SickDrumz & El Guincho)

=== Aleman – Huracán ===
- 14. "El Mexicano"

=== B-Real & Scott Storch – Tell You Somethin ===
- 01. "Get a Bag"
- 02. "Number 9" (feat. Berner)
- 03. "Never Go Home"
- 04. "Hands Up Bands Up" (feat. Tsu Surf)
- 05. "Triple OG" (feat. Freeway)
- 06. "Bad Day" (feat. Krayzie Bone)
- 07. "Mother Mary" (feat. DJ Paul)
- 08. "Runaway"
- 09. "Real G" (feat. Berner, Devin the Dude & Ty Dolla Sign)
- 10. "Tell You Somethin"

== 2022 ==
=== Stanley Enow – Parapariparo (digital single) ===
- 01. "Parapariparo"

== 2023 ==
=== The Isley Brothers – Make Me Say It Again, Girl ===
- 07. "Last Time" (produced with Illa da Producer)
- 12. "Right Way" (produced with Illa da Producer & Avedon)

== 2024 ==
=== Bad Gyal – La joia ===
- 03. "Give Me" (produced with Illa da Producer & Nely)
- 13. "Pop pop" (produced with Illa da Producer & Nely)

== Other technical credits ==
1993

- The Electric Nubians – Sunshine & Marigolds (VLS)

A1. "Sunshine and Marigolds" (organ)
B1. "Memories of the 60's" (organ)

- Divine Beings – Whatever Tracks

B1. "We Can Get Fly" (feat. Black Thought)
B2. "Whatever"

1994

- Spearhead – Home

01. "People in tha Middle" (keyboards)
05. "Of Course You Can" (fender rhodes)
10. "Crime to Be Broke in America" (fender rhodes)

- G. Love & Special Sauce – G. Love and Special Sauce

(Played piano on all songs)

01. "The Things That I Used to Do"
02. "Blues Music"
03. "Garbage Man"
04. "Eyes Have Miles"
05. "Baby's Got Sauce"
06. "Rhyme for the Summertime"
07. "Cold Beverage"
08. "Fatman"
09. "This Ain't Living"
10. "Walk to Slide"
11. "Shooting Hoops (with Mou Akoon)"
12. "Some Peoples Like That"
13. "Town to Town"
14. "I Love You"

- Boogiemonsters – Riders of the Storm: The Underwater Album

03. "Boogie" (additional keyboards)
11. "Salt Water Taffy" (additional keyboards)

- Schoolly D – Welcome to America

(Played keyboards on all songs)

01. "Intro"
02. "I Wanna Get Dusted"
03. "I Know You Want to Kill Me"
04. "Welcome to America"
05. "Niggas Like Me"
06. "Gangsta Trippin"
07. "Gimme Your Shit Nigga"
08. "No Good Nigga"
09. "I Shot da Bitch"
10. "Motherfuckin D"
11. "Stop Frontin"
12. "Peace of What"
13. "Another Sign"

- MC Solaar – Prose Combat

11. "I'm Doin' Fine" (keyboards)

- The Electric Nubians – The Electric Nubians

(Played organ on all songs)

01. "Lady Bus Driver"
02. "Going to New York"
03. "Kaos in the City"
04. "Sunshine & Marigolds"
05. "Butterfly Queen"
06. "Blood on Your Hands"
07. "Try Another Day"
08. "Psychedelic Man"
09. "Dead Meat"
10. "Path Through the Forest"

1995

- Keith Martin – It's Long Overdue

12. "L.O.V.E. Love" (keyboards)

1998

- Mondo Grosso – The Man from Sakura Hills

06. "Closer (The Roots Remix)" (keyboards)

- Various artists – Red Hot + Rhapsody: The Gershwin Groove

06. "Summertime" (performed by Bobby Womack & The Roots) (keyboards)

1999

- Dr. Dre – 2001

(Played keyboards on all songs)

02. "The Watcher"
03. "Fuck You" (feat. Devin the Dude & Snoop Dogg)
04. "Still D.R.E." (feat. Snoop Dogg)
05. "Big Ego's" (feat. Hittman)
12. "Let's Get High" (feat. Hittman, Kurupt & Ms. Roq)
13. "Bitch Niggaz" (feat. Snoop Dogg, Hittman & Six-Two)
15. "Murder Ink" (feat. Hittman & Ms. Roq)

- Jazzyfatnastees – The Once and Future

01. "The Wound" (fender rhodes)
02. "How Sad" (fender rhodes)
03. "Breakthrough" (fender rhodes)
04. "Unconventional Ways" (fender rhodes)
05. "Hear Me" (wurlitzer organ & additional keyboards)
07. "Related to Me" (fender rhodes & drum programming)
10. "Let It Go" (fender rhodes)

- Les Nubians – Tabou (CDS)

01. "Tabou (Roots Remix)" (keyboards)

- Various artists – The Best Man: Music from the Motion Picture

01. "What You Want" (performed by The Roots feat. Jaguar Wright) (keyboards)

- Bob Marley & the Wailers – Chant Down Babylon

12. "Burnin' and Lootin'" (keyboards)

2000

- Xzibit – Restless

04. "U Know" (keyboards)
05. "X" (feat. Snoop Dogg) (keyboards)

- Dice Raw – Reclaiming the Dead

10. "If U Want It" (keyboards)
11. "Forget What They Say" (keyboards)

2001

- D12 – Devil's Night

06. "Ain't Nothing But Music" (keyboards)
11. "Fight Music" (keyboards)
18. "Revelation" (keyboards)

- Eve – Scorpion

04. "Let Me Blow Ya Mind" (feat. Gwen Stefani) (keyboards)
10. "That's What It Is" (keyboards)

- Busta Rhymes – Genesis

08. "Truck Volume" (keyboards)
10. "Break Ya Neck" (keyboards)

- Mack 10 – Bang or Ball

02. "Hate in Yo Eyes" (keyboards)

- Nelly Furtado – Turn Off the Light (CDS)

01. "Turn Off the Light (Remix)" (feat. Timbaland & Ms. Jade) (keyboards & clavinet)

- Bubba Sparxxx – Dark Days, Bright Nights

04. "Bubba Talk" (keyboards)
05. "Lovely" (keyboards)
08. "Get Right" (keyboards)
15. "Bubba Sparxxx" (clavinet)

- Warren G – The Return of the Regulator

02. "Lookin' at You" (feat. LaToiya Williams) (additional keyboards)

- Limp Bizkit – New Old Songs

02. "Take a Look Around (Timbaland Remix)" (additional keyboards)
07. "Rearranged (Timbaland Remix)" (additional keyboards)

- Various artists – The Wash (The Original Motion Picture Soundtrack)

13. "Don't Talk Shit" (performed by Ox) (keyboards)

- Bilal – 1st Born Second

03. "Fast Lane" (keyboards)

2002

- Justin Timberlake – Justified

05. "Cry Me a River" (clavinet)
10. "(And She Said) Take Me Now" (feat. Janet Jackson) (clavinet)

- Jay-Z – The Blueprint 2: The Gift & The Curse

1-03. "The Watcher 2" (feat. Dr. Dre, Rakim & Truth Hurts) (electric piano)

- Ms. Jade – Girl Interrupted

03. "She's a Gangsta" (keyboards)
13. "Feel the Girl" (keyboards)

- Truth Hurts – Truthfully Speaking

12. "Real" (keyboards)

- Jaguar Wright – Denials Delusions and Decisions

04. "Love Need and Want You" (keyboards)
06. "Ain't Nobody Playin'" (keyboards)

- Jazzyfatnastees – The Tortoise & the Hare

04. "Four Lives" (fender rhodes)
06. "Compelled" (keyboards)
07. "Tumbling" (fender rhodes & drum programming)

2003

- Kiley Dean – Simple Girl

03. "Make Me a Song" (keyboards)

- G-Unit – Beg for Mercy

15. "G'D Up" (keyboards)

- 50 Cent – The New Breed

03. "In da Hood" (feat. Brooklyn) (piano)

- Earth, Wind & Fire – The Promise

18. "So Lucky" (keyboards, drums & bass)

- Ginuwine – The Senior

05. "In Those Jeans" (drum programming)

2005

- Fat Joe – All or Nothing

14. "Lean Back (Remix)" (feat. Eminem, Lil Jon, Mase & Remy Ma) (keyboards)

2010

- Big Boi – Sir Lucious Left Foot: The Son of Chico Dusty

05. "Shutterbugg" (feat. Cutty) (drum programming)

2024

- Bad Gyal – La joia

03. "Give Me" (keyboards, drums & bass)
