= The Roots discography =

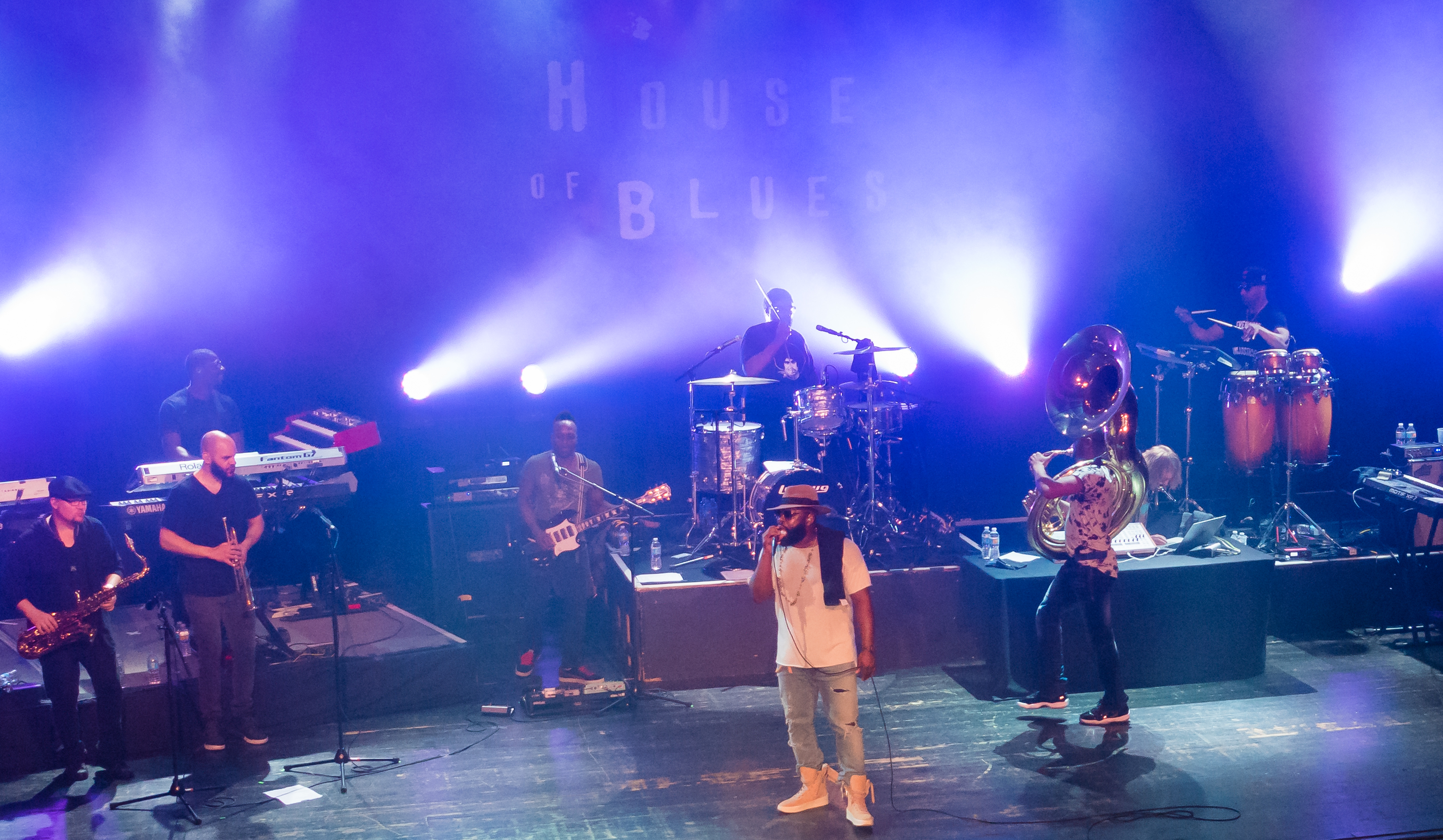
- The Roots performing in 2016
- Studio albums: 14
- Extended plays: 2
- Live albums: 2
- Compilation albums: 3
- Singles: 18
- Music videos: 24

The discography of the Roots, an American hip hop band, consists of fourteen studio albums (including three collaborative studio albums), three compilation albums, two extended plays, and two live albums. The Roots began performing in 1989 as the Square Roots with rapper Black Thought and drummer Questlove. Rapper Malik B., and bassist Leonard Hubbard joined the band in 1991. Over its history, Questlove and Black Thought have always remained with the Roots while their lineup of backing musicians has changed.

In 1993, the Roots debuted with independently released album Organix, and signed to DGC Records (later MCA Records) that same year. The Roots' debuted on Geffen with Do You Want More?!!!??!, an album that was unique in hip hop for using no sampling, and being embraced more by fans of alternative rock than fans of hip hop. Do You Want More?!!!??! peaked at only number 104 on the Billboard 200 chart in the US. Illadelph Halflife, the third album by the Roots, peaked at number twenty-one on the Billboard 200. In 1999, the Roots' fourth album Things Fall Apart became the band's biggest success. The album was certified gold in the US, and its single "You Got Me" peaked at number thirty-nine on the Billboard Hot 100, and number nineteen on the Hot Rap Tracks chart. "You Got Me" won the Grammy Award for Best Rap Performance by a Duo or Group in 2000. In 2002, The Roots released Phrenology, which contained the band's second single to chart on the Hot 100. "Break You Off", which featured Musiq Soulchild, peaked at number ninety-nine.

The Roots founded the company Okayplayer, and released The Tipping Point in 2004. In 2006, the Roots signed to Def Jam, and released Game Theory under Def Jam and Rising Down in 2008; the band's album How I Got Over was released in 2010. The Roots released two live concert albums, the first being The Roots Come Alive in 2000, and the next The Roots Present in 2005. In 2009, the Roots became the house band for the late-night show Late Night with Jimmy Fallon and in 2014, upon Fallon's take over of The Tonight Show, the Roots moved to that series.

== Albums ==
=== Studio albums ===
Year	Album details	Peak chart positions												Certifications
Year	Album details	US	US R&B	AUS	CAN	FIN	FRA	GER	NLD	NOR	SWE	SWI	UK	Certifications
1993	Organix: Released: May 19, 1993; Label: Remedy; Format: CD, cassette, digital download	—	93	—	—	—	—	—	—	—	—	—	—	
1995	Do You Want More?!!!??!: Released: January 17, 1995; Label: DGC (24714); Format: CD, cassette, digital download	104	22	—	—	—	—	—	—	—	87	—	—	RIAA: Gold
1996	Illadelph Halflife: Released: September 24, 1996; Label: DGC (24972); Format: CD, cassette, digital download, LP	21	4	—	—	—	—	—	—	—	56	—	—	
1999	Things Fall Apart: Released: February 23, 1999; Label: MCA (11948); Format: CD, cassette, digital download, LP	4	2	—	7	—	41	64	92	—	—	40	84	RIAA: Platinum; MC: Gold; BPI: Silver
2002	Phrenology: Released: November 26, 2002; Label: MCA (112996); Format: CD, digital download, LP	28	11	—	—	14	117	—	54	—	—	57	112	RIAA: Gold; BPI: Silver
2004	The Tipping Point: Released: July 13, 2004; Label: Geffen (000257302); Format: CD, digital download, LP	4	2	—	—	22	35	44	44	20	37	3	71	
2006	Game Theory: Released: August 29, 2006; Label: Def Jam (0007222); Format: CD, digital download, LP	9	5	—	—	36	69	95	78	26	—	7	76	
2008	Rising Down: Released: April 29, 2008; Label: Def Jam (001113802); Format: CD, digital download, LP	6	3	100	14	—	95	—	—	34	—	10	95	
2010	How I Got Over: Released: June 22, 2010; Label: Def Jam; Format: CD, digital download, LP	6	3	71	14	—	117	70	33	—	—	3	111	
2010	Wake Up! (with John Legend): Released: September 21, 2010; Label: GOOD Music, Columbia, Sony; Format: CD, digital download, LP	8	3	42	16	—	95	69	6	—	29	15	26	
2011	Betty Wright: The Movie (with Betty Wright): Released: November 15, 2011; Label: S-Curve; Format: CD, digital download, LP	197	27	—	—	—	—	—	44	—	—	—	—	
2011	Undun: Released: December 6, 2011; Label: Def Jam; Format: CD, digital download, LP	17	4	66	20	—	—	87	—	91	—	30	178	
2013	Wise Up Ghost (with Elvis Costello): Released: September 17, 2013; Label: Blue Note Records; Format: CD, digital download, LP	16	—	40	—	—	131	29	35	26	—	12	28	
2014	...And Then You Shoot Your Cousin: Released: May 13, 2014; Label: Def Jam; Format: CD, digital download, LP	11	3	34	20	—	127	79	63	—	—	9	111	
"—" denotes a release that did not chart.

=== Compilation albums ===
Year	Album details	Peak chart positions	
Year	Album details	US	US R&B
2005	Home Grown! The Beginners Guide to Understanding The Roots, Vol. 1: Released: November 15, 2005; Label: Geffen (000567002); Format: CD, digital download, LP	161	41
2005	Home Grown! The Beginners Guide to Understanding The Roots, Vol. 2: Released: November 15, 2005; Label: Geffen (000567102); Format: CD, digital download, LP	187	46

=== Live albums ===
Year	Album details	Peak chart positions	
Year	Album details	US	US R&B
1999	The Roots Come Alive: Released: November 2, 1999; Label: MCA (12059); Format: CD, cassette, digital download, LP	50	12
2004	Nagoya Blue Note: Live In Japan – September 7, 2004: Released: 2004; Label: Okapi (unofficial); Format: CD	—	—
"—" denotes a release that did not chart.

== Extended plays ==
Year	Album details
1994	From the Ground Up: Released: April 1, 1994; Label: Geffen (5189412); Format: CD
1999	The Legendary: Released: July 20, 1999; Label: MCA (55539); Format: CD

== Singles ==
Year	Single	Peak chart positions										Certifications	Album
Year	Single	US	US R&B	US Rap	AUS	FRA	GER	NLD	NZL	SWI	UK	Certifications	Album
1994	"Distortion to Static"	—	96	25	—	—	—	—	—	—	—		Do You Want More?!!!??!
1995	"Proceed"	123^{[A]}	79	13	—	—	—	—	—	—	—		Do You Want More?!!!??!
1995	"Silent Treatment"	—	105^{[A]}	31	—	—	—	—	—	—	—		Do You Want More?!!!??!
1995	"Proceed II" (featuring Roy Ayers)	—	—	—	—	—	—	—	—	—	—		Stolen Moments: Red Hot + Cool
1996	"Clones" (featuring Dice Raw & M.A.R.S.)	101^{[A]}	62	11	—	—	—	—	—	—	—		Illadelph Halflife
1996	"What They Do" (featuring Raphael Saadiq)	34	21	5	—	—	—	—	—	—	49		Illadelph Halflife
1997	"Concerto of the Desperado"	71	57	9	—	—	—	—	—	—	—		Illadelph Halflife
1998	"Adrenaline!" (featuring Dice Raw & Beanie Sigel)	—	73	29	—	—	—	—	—	—	—		Things Fall Apart
1998	"You Got Me" (featuring Erykah Badu and Eve)	39	11	19	—	28	25	46	37	15	31	BPI: Silver; RMNZ: Gold	Things Fall Apart
1999	"The Next Movement" (featuring DJ Jazzy Jeff and Jazzyfatnastees)	—	103^{[A]}	—	—	—	—	—	—	—	—		Things Fall Apart
1999	"What You Want" (featuring Jaguar Wright)	—	82	—	—	—	—	—	—	—	—		The Best Man (soundtrack) / The Roots Come Alive
2001	"Glitches (The Skin You're In)" (featuring Amel Larrieux)	—	—	—	—	—	—	—	—	—	—		Down to Earth (soundtrack)
2002	"Break You Off" (featuring Musiq Soulchild)	99	55	—	—	—	—	—	—	—	59		Phrenology
2003	"The Seed (2.0)" (featuring Cody ChesnuTT)	—	—	—	78	—	67	31	—	22	33	RMNZ: Gold	Phrenology
2004	"Don't Say Nuthin'"	—	66	—	—	—	66	—	—	27	92		The Tipping Point
2004	"I Don't Care" (featuring Dom)	—	—	—	—	—	—	—	—	54	97		The Tipping Point
2004	"Stay Cool"	53^{[B]}	31^{[B]}	—	—	—	—	—	—	—	—		The Tipping Point
2006	"Don't Feel Right" (featuring Maimouna Youssef)	—	48^{[B]}	—	—	—	—	—	—	—	200		Game Theory
2007	"Marathon Man (Remix)"	—	—	—	—	—	—	—	—	—	—		data-sort-value="" style="background: var(--background-color-interactive, #ececec); color: var(--color-base, inherit); vertical-align: middle; text-align: center; " class="table-na" | Non-album single
2008	"Birthday Girl" (featuring Patrick Stump)	—	—	—	—	—	—	—	—	—	—		Rising Down
2008	"Rising Up" (featuring Chrisette Michele and Wale)	—	—	—	—	—	—	—	—	—	—		Rising Down
2009	"How I Got Over" (featuring Dice Raw)	—	—	—	—	—	—	—	—	—	—		How I Got Over
2010	"Dear God 2.0" (featuring Monsters of Folk)	—	—	—	—	—	—	—	—	—	—		How I Got Over
2010	"The Fire" (featuring John Legend)	—	—	—	—	—	—	—	—	—	—		How I Got Over
2010	"Wake Up Everybody" (with John Legend featuring Common & Melanie Fiona)	—	53	—	—	—	—	21	—	62	179		Wake Up!
2010	"Hard Times" (with John Legend)	—	—	—	—	—	—	—	—	—	—		Wake Up!
2011	"Shine" (with John Legend)	—	64	—	—	—	—	—	—	—	—		Wake Up!
2011	"Make My" (featuring Big K.R.I.T.)	—	—	—	—	—	—	—	—	—	—		Undun
2011	"Tip the Scale" (featuring Dice Raw)	—	—	—	—	—	—	—	—	—	—		Undun
2014	"Glitches"	—	—	—	—	—	—	—	—	—	—		...And Then You Shoot Your Cousin
2014	"When the People Cheer"	—	—	—	—	—	—	—	—	—	—		...And Then You Shoot Your Cousin
"—" denotes a release that did not chart.

- A. Charted only on the Bubbling Under Hot 100 Singles or Bubbling Under R&B/Hip-Hop Singles charts, 25-song extensions to the Billboard Hot 100 and Hot R&B/Hip-Hop Songs charts respectively.
- B. Charted only on the Hot Singles Sales or Hot R&B/Hip-Hop Singles Sales charts.
- C. Charted only on the R&B/Hip-Hop Digital Songs chart.

== Other appearances ==
† = vocals by Black Thought

Year	Song	Album
1994	"Believe (Roots Remix)" (with Galliano)^{†}	A Thicker Plot - Remixes '93/'94
1994	"I'm Doin Fine"(with MC Solaar)^{†}	Prose Combat
1996	"Da Jawn" (with Bahamadia)^{†}	Kollage
1996	"I Confess (The Roots Remix)" (with Bahamadia)	—N/a
1996	"Au Natural (After Midnight Remix)" Sweetback featuring Bahamadia	Non-album single
1996	"Montara (The Roots Remix)" Bobby Hutcherson with Jazzyfatnastees and Fatin Dantzler	The New Groove: The Blue Note Remix Project
1996	"The Good, The Bad and The Desolate"^{†}	High School High: The Soundtrack
1997	"Brain" Jungle Brothers	Raw Deluxe
1997	"The 'Notic" (with D'Angelo)^{†}	Men in Black: The Album
1997	"Sometimes"/"Sometimes (Mix #9)" Erykah Badu	Baduizm
1997	"All Night Long" Common & Erykah Badu	One Day It'll All Make Sense
1997	"The Show"^{†}	In Tha Beginning...There Was Rap
1998	"Why?" (with Eric Benét)	Ride (soundtrack)
1998	"Summertime" (with Bobby Womack)	Red Hot + Rhapsody: The Gershwin Groove
1998	"Closer (Roots Remix)" Mondo Grosso	The Man from Sakura Hills
1998	"Let It Go" (with Jazzyfatnastees)	Down in the Delta (soundtrack)
1998	"Three Ring Government" (with Jazzyfatnastees)	Schoolhouse Rocks the Vote
1998	"Tabou (Roots Remix)" (with Les Nubians)^{†}	Princesses Nubiennes
1998	"Take It There" (Remix) (with Nonchalant)^{†}	Non-album single
1999	"It's All About You (Not About Me Remix)"(with Tracie Spencer)^{†}	Non-album single
1999	"Burnin' and Lootin' (Remix)" (with Bob Marley)^{†}	Chant Down Babylon
1999	"Ya' All Know Who!"^{†}	The Wood (soundtrack)
1999	"Suga Sista" (with Rahzel and Aaron Hall)^{†}	Make the Music 2000
1999	"Rafiki" (with Zap Mama)^{†}	A Ma Zone
2000	"Hurricane" (with Common, Mos Def, Jazzyfatnastees, Dice Raw and Flo Brown)^{†}	Hurricane (soundtrack)
2000	"The Roots (Interlude)"	Who Is Jill Scott?: Words and Sounds Vol. 1
2000	"Masquerade"; "Till She Comes"; "Nothing but Your Love (Roots Remix) Toshinobu Kubota	Nothing But Your Love
2000	"Work" (with Alechia James)^{†}	Bait (soundtrack)
2000	"Lift Your Fist" (with Guru)^{†}	Guru's Jazzmatazz, Vol. 3: Streetsoul
2000	"Blackman Know Yourself (Roots Remix)" Femi Kuti	Shoki Shoki
2000	"Burned Hollywood Burned" (with Chuck D and Zack de la Rocha)^{†}	Bamboozled (soundtrack)
2001	"Caravan"^{†}	Red Hot + Indigo
2001	"War" Dilated Peoples	Expansion Team
2001	"Keep Playin' Me" Sandra St. Victor	Gemini- Both Sides
2002	"Tao of the Machine" (with BT)^{†}	Blade II (soundtrack) / Emotional Technology
2002	"Act Too (Love of My Life) [Remix]"^{†}	Brown Sugar (soundtrack)
2004	"Funky Kingston" Toots and the Maytals	True Love
2005	"Set Em on Fire" (with Porn & Dice Raw)	NBA 2K6
2006	"Boom! (Live Album Version)" (with Kool G Rap and Big Daddy Kane)^{†}	Dave Chapelle's Block Party
2009	"Walkin My Baby Back Home" Nat King Cole	Re:Generations
2010	"I'll Stand by You"; Shakira "Hard Times Come Again No More"; Mary J. Blige "Let It Be"; Jennifer Hudson	Hope for Haiti Now
2012	"Ain't Gonna Let Nobody Turn Me Round"	Soundtrack for a Revolution (soundtrack)
2012	"Twice" Robert Glasper featuring Solange	Black Radio Rediscovered: The Remix EP
2016	Bittersweet (Side A + B) (with Stella Artois)^{†}	Le Savoir
2016	"No John Trumbull (Intro)"^{†} "My Shot (Rise Up Remix)" (with Busta Rhymes, Joell Ortiz and Nate Ruess)^{†} "You'll Be Back" (with Jimmy Fallon) "Who Tells Your Story" (with Common and Ingrid Michaelson)^{†}	The Hamilton Mixtape
2016	Champion^{†}	NBA Finals 2016 Theme Song
2017	"It Ain't Fair" (with Bilal)^{†}	Detroit (soundtrack)
2019	"Feel It (You Got It)" (with Tish Hyman)^{†}	Non-album single
2020	"This Land (Remix)" (Gary Clark Jr.)^{†}	—N/a

== Music videos ==
- 1993: "Pass the Popcorn" (as The Square Roots)
- 1994: "Distortion to Static" (Do You Want More?!??!)
- 1994: "Proceed" (DYWM)
- 1994: "Proceed II" (Red Hot + Cool)
- 1995: "Silent Treatment" (DYWM)
- 1996: "Clones" (Illadelph Halflife)
- 1996: "Concerto of the Desperado" (IH)
- 1996: "What They Do" (IH)
- 1998: "Take It There (Remix)" (Nonchalant featuring The Roots)
- 1999: "You Got Me" (Things Fall Apart)
- 1999: "The Next Movement" (TFA)
- 1999: "Rafiki" (Zap Mama featuring The Roots)
- 1999: "What You Want" (The Best Man [Soundtrack]}
- 2001: "Glitches" (Down to Earth [Soundtrack])
- 2002: "Break You Off" (Phrenology)
- 2002: "The Seed 2.0" (P)
- 2004: "Don't Say Nothin'" (The Tipping Point)
- 2004: "Star" (TP)
- 2004: "I Don't Care" (TP)
- 2006: "In the Music/Here I Come/Don't Feel Right" (Game Theory)
- 2008: "75 Bars (Black's Reconstruction)" (Rising Down)
- 2008: "Get Busy" (RD)
- 2008: "Birthday Girl" (RD)
- 2008: "Rising Up" (RD)
- 2009: "How I Got Over" (How I Got Over)
- 2010: "Dear God 2.0" (HIGO)
- 2010: "The Fire" (HIGO)
- 2010: "Hard Times (Studio Video)" (Wake Up!)
- 2010: "I Can't Write Left Handed (Studio Video)" (WU)
- 2010: "Wake Up Everybody" (WU)
- 2011: "Undun: The Short Clips" ("Make My"; "Stomp"; "Tip The Scale"; "Sleep") [Undun]
- 2014: "When the People Cheer" (...And Then You Shoot Your Cousin)
- 2014: "Understand" (ATYSYC)
