= Stevvi Alexander =

American singer-songwriter

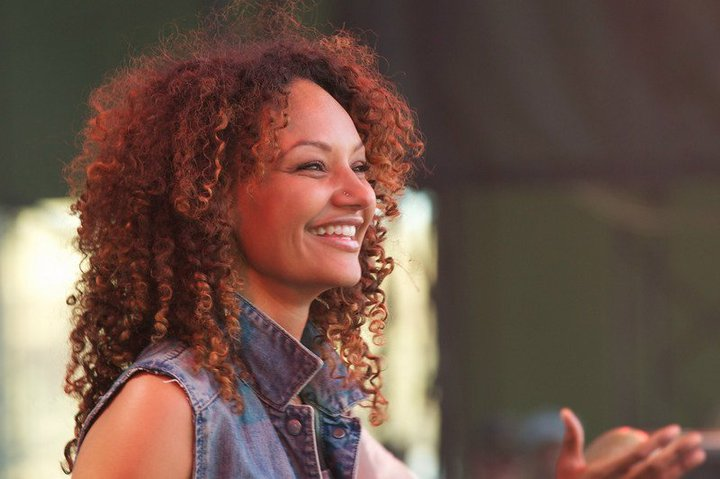
Stevvi Alexander in concert

Stephanie "Stevvi" Alexander is an American singer-songwriter and guitarist. She was featured as an artist with the Game of Thrones Live Concert Experience in 2017, alongside the show's composer Ramin Djawadi. She has also appeared in Michael Jackson: The Immortal World Tour by Cirque du Soleil.

== Early life ==
Alexander's mother is of English, French and German descent and her father is African-American. Both are pastors. Her father is a Pentecostal Bishop and her mother co-pastors their church, Shield of Faith, located in Pomona, California, the parent church to an international roster of churches in states around the US and in countries like Belgium, Fiji and Korea. The church is active in building up the local and international community through housing programs and missions.

== Career ==
Alexander has released an independent album, The East Side Psalmbook and is part of the songwriting/production team Band Kamp. She started her career when she signed to Columbia Records with the group Saraparker under the tutelage of Sam Sapp. She worked closely with the LA based trio Star69 which featured Dawn Beckman (formerly of the Jazzyfatnastees) and Sy Smith (not to be confused with the similarly named Los Angeles band "Star 69" featuring Julie Daniels.)

The East Side Psalmbook is a contemporary Christian album released in 2008. The album features Raphael Saadiq on bass. The album was produced by the duo Hollins Steele (Dayna Hollins and Benny Steele), at The Steele Factory recording studios in Brooklyn, New York.

She has recorded with Incubus, Macy Gray, Colbie Caillat, Mike Posner, Q-Burns Abstract Message, Gin Wigmore, the UK band Hard-Fi, The Damned Things and toured the world with artists ranging from Fleetwood Mac, Barbra Streisand, Sheryl Crow, Britney Spears, Justin Timberlake, The Roots, Gwen Stefani and Diana Ross.

Alexander had a recurring role on David E. Kelley's television show The Wedding Bells playing a wedding singer performing both on-screen and recording the music off-screen. She has also appeared in Sam Raimi’s Spider-Man as part of Macy Gray's band and in Garry Marshall's film New Year's Eve playing alongside Leah Michelle and Lucy Woodward as a backing singer for Jon Bon Jovi. Recently Alexander was also featured in 20 Feet from Stardom, a documentary film which premiered at the Sundance Film Festival in January 2013, about acclaimed background singers produced by Morgan Neville, and Gil Friesen of Tremolo Productions.

She released a personal collection of songs in early 2008 called The East Side Psalmbook which features Raphael Saadiq guesting on bass.

== Personal life ==
Alexander has a son, Eric Alexander-Hughes, with film producer and director Allen Hughes of the Hughes Brothers while the two were in high school.

== Discography ==
- 88-Keys, The Death of Adam
- Incubus, Morning View
- Macy Gray, The Id
- Mike Posner, 31 Minutes to Takeoff
- Gin Wigmore, Gravel and Wine
- Hard Fi, Killer Sounds
- The Damned Things, Ironiclast
- Colbie Caillat, Christmas in the Sand
- Q-Burns Abstract Message feat. Stevvi Alexander, "Balearic Chainsaw (Scott Hardkiss Remix)"

== Filmography ==
Year	Role	Film
2011	Singer	New Year's Eve
2013	Herself	20 Feet from Stardom

== Television ==
Year	TV Show	Role	Note
2019	Euphoria	Nurse	Episode: "And Salt the Earth Behind You"
