= Denials Delusions and Decisions =

Studio album by Jaguar Wright
- Released: January 29, 2002
- Studios: The Studio, Philadelphia
- Genres: Hip hop soul; neo soul; R&B
- Length: 56:13
- Label: MCA
- Producers: Scott Storch; James Poyser; Vikter Duplaix; ?uestlove

Jaguar Wright chronology
Denials Delusions and Decisions (2002)	Divorcing Neo 2 Marry Soul (2005)

Singles from Denials Delusions and Decisions
- 1. "Ain't Nobody Playin'" Released: 2001; 2. "I Can't Wait" Released: November 2001; 3. "The What If's" Released: 2002

Denials Delusions and Decisions is the debut studio album by American soul singer Jaguar Wright. Released by MCA on January 29, 2002, the album incorporates elements of soul, R&B, funk, hip-hop, and jazz. Wright's lyrics center on relationships, breakups, family, and self-love. Preceding its release, Wright drew buzz with her backup vocals on Jay-Z's MTV Unplugged performance, as well as the use of single "The What-If's" in a Coca-Cola commercial shortly after the album's release.

The album drew generally favorable reviews from critics, who praised Wright's vocals, songwriting, and production. The album debuted at number 56 on the Billboard 200 and peaked within the top 20 of the Top R&B/Hip-Hop Albums chart, although it received limited promotion from MCA, which would be absorbed by Geffen Records the following year. The album also spawned three singles: "Ain't Nobody Playin'", "I Can't Wait", and "The What If's". The latter was promoted by a music video inspired by D'Angelo's "Untitled (How Does It Feel)" and reached number 24 on the Adult R&B Songs chart.

== Background ==
For the ten years leading up to the release of Denials Delusions and Decisions, Wright sought to enter the music industry. She began as an MC in group the Philly Blunts. Critic Peter Margasak viewed her past work as a rapper as influential on her later vocal performances. Following work as a cashier and roadie, she performed at a 1997 music industry conference. In 1999, she began performing at open mic event Black Lilly in Philadelphia, and Bryce Wilson of Groove Theory invited her to join his group. However, Wright opted to instead begin recording with the Roots, who had helped to organize Black Lilly and who she felt "offered me an opportunity to move forward with my own career and do music I believe in". Most members of the Roots were involved in the recording of the album. She began writing and singing hooks for the group, including "What Ya Want", and joined the group for a 1999 performance on The Chris Rock Show.

== Composition ==
"The What If's", in which Wright confronts an unfaithful lover, has blues and funk influences. In the song, Wright announces that "It don't hurt no more/when I see you with that other bitch", although critic David Cantwell suggested that "her boast is denial, delusion or both". She said that she had written it in her parents' backyard while thinking about her ex-boyfriend of three years. Wright told MTV that the song was easy to write, recalling that "'What if' was the biggest phrase I used in that whole sad three-year relationship. Words started coming to me. By the time I put out my cigarette and walked up to my room, the song was finished." "Stay", which discusses self-doubt and incorporates Latin influences, and "Country Song" are considered "more traditional R&B fare" in contrast to the more hip-hop oriented tracks. "Love, Need and Want You" is a cover of the 1984 song by Patti Labelle, a fellow Philadelphia-raised soul singer. "Same Shit, Different Day, Pt. 1" is a discussion of a "go-nowhere relationship" or love triangle, with lyrics including "I mean it's like hand me down shoes [...] I feel divorced on my anniversary". It drew comparison to Jill Scott's "A Long Walk" (2000), D'Angelo's "Shit, Damn, Motherfucker" (1995), Hall and Oates's "Sarah Smile" (1975), and Common's "A Film Called Pimp" (2000). The song's title is derived from the saying "don't matter the day, shit's still the same".

"Ain't Nobody Playin'", a collaboration with Black Thought, is directed at an inconsiderate friend. AllMusic considered it the album's "most hip-hop-informed" song. Multiple critics compared "2 Too Many" to the music of Rufus and "I Can't Wait" to the work of Prince. "I Can't Wait" features R&B singer Bilal, whose "creeping" verse includes the lines "here I am drawers in hand/housewife going, think she won't be back 'till 10 AM". Wright described the song as sounding like "2001 Prince meets Apollonia — but now she can sing". "I Don't Know", another collaboration with Black Thought, was described by The Village Voice critic Carol Cooper as a "frothy roller-disco track". Wright stated that the song that took her the longest time to write was "Lineage", a tribute to loved ones who have passed away. Wright reported that over the year that she wrote the song, five family members died, so she waited to finish writing the song until "people stopped dying", so she wouldn't "leave anybody else out". "Self Love" is inspired by Jamaican rasta music. The track also drew comparison to the Dungeon Family song "Rollin'" and recent De La Soul recordings, as each discussed mortality in a tone influenced by the September 11 attacks. Closing track "Same Shit, Different Day, Pt. 2" was considered more "defiant" compared with part one, with lyrics like "why I got to be the bigger woman/when these bitches know they got that shit coming". Neal pointed to the song, as well as a recent performance by Scott, as evidence that neo soul isn't necessarily "peaceful". Similarly, W. Jacarl Melton suggested that both parts of "Same Shit, Different Day" had "thoroughly confused some of the bohemian types who assumed the strong association between neo-soul and the City of Brotherly Love meant her CD would be filled with deep tributes to loves both found and lost".

== Release and promotion ==
Mark Anthony Neal, writing for PopMatters, referred to the album as "oft-delayed". In the October 20, 2001, edition of Billboard, Gail Mitchell reported that the album would be released on January 22, 2002, and that that month would be "busy" for new R&B releases. The release date was ultimately pushed to January 29, 2002, when it was released by MCA Records. Of the album title, Wright told MTV that "Those three things are something everybody has in common [...] Sometimes we play the fool, sometimes we fool people". The liner notes include a photo of Wright with her middle finger raised.

The album experienced significant buzz in the lead-up to its release. It gained increased exposure after Wright's appearance and performance of "The What-If's" with The Roots in a Coca-Cola commercial as part of their "Nu-Soul" marketing campaign. The ad began airing on February 4, 2002. Wright also gained acclaim for her performance as a backing vocalist in Jay-Z's MTV Unplugged performance, particularly for her vocal exchange with Jay-Z on "Heart of the City (Ain't No Love)". She further toured with the Roots and Maxwell. Wright received further support from Okayplayer, an online music community associated with the Roots. However, the album received limited promotion from MCA, which was experiencing financial trouble and would be absorbed by Geffen a year later.

The album spawned three singles. The lead single was "Ain't Nobody Playin'", which Billboard singles critic Rashaun Hall called "sorely underappreciated". The second single, "I Can't Wait", featured R&B singer Bilal and was released in November 2001. The third single, "The What-If's", was released in 2002, with an accompanying music video based on D'Angelo's "Untitled (How Does It Feel)", with the plot twist that rather than being naked, Wright reveals her pregnant stomach. In a March 2002 interview, ?uestlove told MTV that "We wanted to take the 'Untitled' approach in this one — except that she's not naked", declining to elaborate further before the video's release. The single entered the Adult R&B Songs chart, peaking at number 24 on the chart dated May 25, 2002.

== Critical reception ==
Professional ratings
Review scores
Source	Rating
AllMusic	4/5 stars
Blender	3/5 stars
Entertainment Weekly	B+
The Guardian	4/5 stars
Rolling Stone	3.5/5 stars

Denials Delusions and Decisions was well received by music critics. In the February 9, 2002, issue of Billboard, critic Rashaun Hall wrote that the album "introduces a fresh voice to the world of R&B" and hailed Wright as "the princess of hip-hop soul". Critic Jason Birchmeier, writing for AllMusic, designated the record as an "album pick" in Wright's discography and awarded it four stars out of five. In a 2012 retrospective article for The Virginian-Pilot, critic Rashod Ollison wrote that "the production is thoroughly modern and holds up well a decade later". Writing for The Washington Post, Ta-Nehisi Coates called the album "some of the best soul music you will hear this year" but criticized Wright's image as an "angry, post-feminist black woman", arguing that it distracts from her talent.

At the end of 2002, Associated Press music writer Nekesa Mumbi Moody ranked the album as the best album of the year, opining that "the songs are so artfully crafted - and sung with so much emotion - that they are elevated to works of art".

== Commercial performance ==
Billboard and The Baltimore Sun reported that the album underperformed commercial expectations. Conversely, The Virginian-Pilot considered the album's chart performance "not bad", given its limited promotion and lack of radio-friendly material, and critic Robert Christgau commented in a later review that the album had "sold respectably". In the issue of Billboard dated February 16, 2002, Denials Delusions and Decisions debuted at its peak of number 56 on the Billboard 200. It also debuted at number 18 on the Top R&B/Hip-Hop Albums chart, becoming the second-highest debut of the week, after the motion picture soundtrack for State Property, which debuted at number one. The following week on the Billboard 200, it fell 26 spots to number 82, while rising two spots to its peak of number 16 on the Top R&B/Hip-Hop Albums chart. As of June 1, 2012, the album has sold close to 300,000 units.

In an April 2003 article for The Baltimore Sun, critic Rashod D. Ollison wrote that the album had "gone unnoticed" and pointed to its commercial underperformance as one reason he wondered "will R&B ever be interesting again?" In a 2005 Billboard profile, Wright voiced frustration with the album's fate, blaming her label's lack of promotion and MCA's absorption by Geffen. She reflected that "I'm proud of Denials, but not of what happened to it [...] They sat on me with a Mack truck, but I kept going."

== Track listing ==
Adapted from AllMusic.

1. The What-If's — 4:17
2. Country Song — 3:56
3. Stay — 2:30
4. Love, Need and Want You — 4:07
5. Same Sh*t, Different Day, Pt. 1 — 4:29
6. Ain't Nobody Playin' — 4:19
7. I Can't Wait — 3:28
8. I Don't Know — 4:43
9. 2 Too Many — 4:47
10. Lineage — 5:52
11. Self Love — 9:15
12. Same Sh*t, Different Day, Pt. 2 — 4:30

== Charts ==
Chart (2002)	Peak position
US Billboard 200	56
US Top R&B/Hip-Hop Albums (Billboard)	16
