= Divorcing Neo 2 Marry Soul =

Studio album by Jaguar Wright
- Released: July 12, 2005
- Genres: R&B; soul; pop
- Length: 1:07:48
- Label: Artemis Records
- Producers: Mike City; Raphael Saadiq; Jake and the Phatman; Carvin & Ivan; Scott Storch; James Poyser; Carl Thompson; Hotrunner; Kelvin Wooten

Jaguar Wright chronology
Denials Delusions and Decisions (2002)	Divorcing Neo 2 Marry Soul (2005)

Singles from Divorcing Neo 2 Marry Soul
- 1. "Free" Released: November 14, 2005

Divorcing Neo 2 Marry Soul is the second studio album by American soul singer Jaguar Wright. Originally titled And Your Point Is..., Wright finished recording the album in April 2003, and it was originally slated to be released by MCA Records that year. However, after Geffen Records absorbed MCA and shelved the album, Wright secured rights to some of the tracks she had recorded and sought a new label. She ultimately signed with independent label Artemis Records, which released the album on July 12, 2005. The album was promoted by the lead single "Free", which received a radio remix and was commercially released in November 2005.

An R&B and soul record which incorporates elements of hip hop and pop, the album was considered more mainstream than her debut, Denials Delusions and Decisions (2002). Lyrical subjects include infidelity, breakups, and parenthood. Upon its release, the album drew generally favorable reviews from critics, who praised Wright's vocals and songwriting, although some considered the album inconsistent or inferior to Wright's live performances. The album debuted at number 62 on the Billboard Top R&B/Hip-Hop Albums chart, her second entry on the chart.

== Background ==
In 2002, following numerous delays, Wright released her debut studio album, Denials Delusions and Decisions. The album drew favorable reviews from critics, being ranked the best album of the year by an Associated Press music writer, but under-performed commercial expectations, peaking at number 56 on the Billboard 200. Wright attributed the album's sales to her label's lack of promotion. Wright was considered part of the "neo-soul" movement, although she disagreed with the label.

On April 30, 2003, Billboard reported that Wright had finished recording her follow-up album, to be titled And Your Point Is..., and that MCA would release it later in the year. However, Geffen absorbed MCA later in 2003, then declined to release And Your Point Is.... Wright managed to make a deal with the label to get back 10 of the tracks she had recorded for the album, then began shopping them around to other labels, eventually deciding to seek an independent release. In the April 9, 2005, issue of Billboard, it was reported that Wright had signed with independent label Artemis Records and that they would release her second album, now titled Divorcing Neo 2 Marry Soul, in June. Regarding their decision to sign Wright, Artemis Records president Daniel Glass cited Wright's truth-teller image, likening her to Steve Earle, Chuck D, and Sinéad O'Connor as "one of the few visionary artists who will risk laying it all on the line". He elaborated: "I always think about the Jack Nicholson line in 'A Few Good Men' when I think of Jaguar: 'You want the truth... You can't handle the truth.'"

== Composition ==
Divorcing, an R&B and soul album, features producers including Raphael Saadiq, Mike City, and Chucky Thompson. Critic Curt Fields described the arrangements as "mid-tempo smooth grooves", while fellow critic Rebecca Barry Hill compared the album's "deep, sexy grooves" to Meshell Ndegeocello. The album includes "slick" preprogrammed beats, in contrast with the live instrumentation on much of her debut. Regarding the shift, Wright said that her goal was to be "more accessible, a little more mainstream". The track "Flower" includes a string section, while "Call Block" has a hip-hop influence and features a rap verse by Obie Trice.

The album's lyrics, which have been described as "tighter" than those of her debut and as not "quite hooky", address the "messy side of love". The opening track, "Dear John, Pt. 1", includes the line "Out with the old, in with the new", and discusses Wright's move away from the "neo-soul" label. Regarding the track, Wright told Billboard that "I'm embracing my history; to hell with the other stuff". On "Free", Wright tells a lover to leave if he doesn't feel the way he used to, with lyrics including "I let you get away with lots / Do you love me or do you love me not / At this point it doesn't matter cause I'm truly less than flattered." "Told Ya" addresses domestic violence, in a tone that critic Topher Sanders considered "ridiculing". "Flower" is dedicated to her two sons and includes a vocal performance which the Washington Post likened to Patti LaBelle. A critic for the New Zealand Herald compared "Play the Field" to Aretha Franklin's "R.E.S.P.E.C.T.". "Woman to Woman", a cover of the 1970s soul hit by Shirley Brown, was considered to have "old school" lyrics, such as "You better just back on up, before I smack you with my frying pan". Wright added new lyrics to the song as well, such as "You better have a good dental plan". Wright adopts the persona of a gold digger on "One More Drink" and of a "casually mistreated" woman on "Timing". Bonus track "Call Block" discusses restraining orders, and Wright notes that her cousins will look out for her.

== Release and promotion ==
"I never believed in the neo terminology; I'm a soul singer. I acknowledge that neo is how I built my career. But I've got to leave you, baby. Thanks for the wonderful time."

— Wright, Billboard (July 9, 2005)

The album was released on July 12, 2005, via a joint partnership between Artemis and Song Records, an offshoot of Delta's Song airline. It marked the second release through the partnership, following Better than Ezra's Before the Robots. The album was promoted by video play on BET, as well as by an opinion piece penned by Wright in the August 6, 2005, issue of Billboard, in which she called on her fellow musicians to be better role models for young female listeners. Regarding the title, Wright sought to distance herself from the "neo-soul" label, telling The Baltimore Sun that "Neo means new, and there's nothing new about soul, which is what I do [...] I'm not bringing anything new. It's the passing of the torch. I'm bringing the honesty back, reminding folks how important it is to hold on to the legacy".

"Free" was released as the lead single. A remix featuring rapper Freeway was sent to radio in summer 2005, while a CD single was released commercially on November 14, 2005.

== Reception ==
=== Critical ===
Professional ratings
Review scores
Source	Rating
Blender	3/5 stars
Entertainment Weekly	C+
The New Zealand Herald	4/4 stars
Robert Christgau	(2-star Honorable Mention)

In a review for The Washington Post, critic Curt Fields deemed the album "an unpretentious R&B disc", praising Wright's personality and vocal delivery and concluding that her attitude makes the album "a wedding party worth attending". Writing for Blender, Christgau awarded the album three stars and credited the album with demonstrating that Wright is "more than an intelligent sidekick", praising her personas and concluding that "she's singer enough to make each [song] stand and assert itself". In a later, standalone review for his consumer guide, Christgau gave the album a two-star honorable mention, naming "Woman to Woman" and "One More Drink" as choice cuts and calling her "the intelligent black woman, from helpmate to party girl". New Zealand Herald critic Rebecca Barry Hill gave the album four stars and called the album a "bold, stylish release from a singer who isn't just a wildcat by name". Dan Cairns, reviewing the album for The Sunday Times, praised Wright's vocal performance and lyrics, arguing that her music was set apart by the "songs' emotional intelligence and honesty", as well as her voice.

Danish newspaper Politiken, in a review by Eric Jensen, regarded the album as inferior to Denials Delusions and Decisions, but still called Wright "an exquisite singer with an eminent phrasing" and highlighted "Let Me Be the One", "Woman to Woman", "Ecstasy", "Free", and "One More Drink". Sanders, writing for the Miami New Times, singled out "My Place" as a highlight but objected to the tone of "Told Ya" and argued that too many of the songs were "skippable". Critic Margeaux Watson, in a review for Entertainment Weekly, named four standout tracks — "Free", "My Place", "Do Your Worst", and "Woman 2 Woman" — but wrote that the rest failed to live up to Wright's live performances.

=== Commercial ===
Speaking about her expectations for the album's commercial performance, Wright told Billboard that she would be happy regardless of the album's sales: "I'm not in this game for fame. I'm just helping to keep our culture alive." The album debuted at number 62 on the US Top R&B/Hip-Hop Albums chart dated July 30, 2005, becoming her second entry on the chart, though her first to miss the top 50.

== Track listing ==
Adapted from AllMusic and liner notes.

No.	Title	Writer(s)	Producer(s)	Length
1.	"Dear John Part 1"	Jaguar Wright, Hotrunner	Hotrunner	1:45
2.	"Free"	Wright; Hotrunner; Joseph Melotti; Vicki Sue Robinson	Hotrunner	4:13
3.	"Let Me Be the One"	Wright, Mike City	City	4:22
4.	"Timing"	Wright, Carl Thompson	Thompson	4:23
5.	"Told Ya"	Wright; Bobby Ozuna; Glenn Standridge; Raphael Saadiq	Saadiq, Jake and the Phatman	4:05
6.	"My Place"	Wright; Ozuna; Standridge; Saadiq; Kelvin Wooten	Jake and the Phatman; Saadiq; Wooten	4:01
7.	"Flower"	Carvin & Ivan	Carvin & Ivan	5:39
8.	"Play the Field"	Carvin & Ivan, Talib Johnson	Carvin & Ivan	4:20
9.	"Ecstasy"	Wright; Ozuna; Standridge; Saadiq; Wooten	Saadiq; Jake and the Phatman; Wooten	4:24
10.	"So High"	Wright, Scott Storch	Storch	3:31
11.	"Been Here Before"	Wright, James Poyser	Poyser	3:41
12.	"Woman to Woman Intro"	Eddie Marion; Henderson Thigpen; James Banks	Wright	1:40
13.	"Woman to Woman"	Marion; Thigpen; Banks	Wright	3:52
14.	"Do Your Worst"	Wright	Wright	11:54
15.	"One More Drink"	Wright; Ozuna; Standridge; Saadiq; Wooten	Saadiq; Jake and the Phatman; Wooten	4:44
16.	"Dear John Part 2"	Wright, Hotrunner	Hotrunner	1:51
17.	"Call Block (featuring Obie Trice)"	Wright; Hotrunner; Trice	Hotrunner	3:59
Total length:				67:48

- Tracks 12 and 13 sample "Woman to Woman", written by James Banks, Eddie Marin and Henderson Thigpen Jr., and performed by Shirley Brown.

== Personnel ==
Adapted from liner notes.

Locations

- Mixed at Larry Gold Studios; The Enterprise; Time Machine Studio; Blakeslee Recording Studios; Mixtar Studios; Electric Lady Studios, New York; The Hit Factory, Miami; SF Soundworks; and Sterling Sound
- Mastered at Sterling Sound

Musicians

- Wright — vocals (all tracks)
- Aaries — backing vocals (track 8)
- Adam Blackstone — bass (track 2)
- Randy Bowland — guitar (tracks 12–14)
- Aaron Draper — percussion (track 2)
- Omar Edwards — keyboards (tracks 2, 12–14)
- Larry Gold — strings (tracks 12–14)
- James "Darryl" Robinson — drums (track 2)
- Vicki Sue Robinson — backing vocals (track 2)
- Frank Romano — bass and guitar (track 8)
- Musiq Soulchild — backing vocals (track 8)
- Eric Tribett — drums (tracks 12–14)
- Thaddaeus Tribbett — bass (tracks 12–14)

Technical

- Chris Athens — mixing (track 17), mastering (all tracks)
- Sean "Bruizer" Brooks — A&R
- Gerry Brown — engineering (tracks 5, 6, 9, 15)
- Barron Claiborne — photography
- Russ Elevado — mixing (tracks 1, 2, 9, 11–16)
- Jeremiah Ellison — engineering (track 17)
- Serban Ghenea — mixing (tracks 7–8)
- Jason Goldstein — mixing (track 10)
- Gordon Goss — engineering (track 4)
- Kurt Nepogoda — engineering (assistant) (track 15), mixing (assistant) (tracks 9, 15)
- Samuel Odom — production coordination (track 17)
- Melanie Paykos — CD cover design
- Dave Pensado — mixing (track 3)
- John Phipps — mixing (track 4)
- Montez Roberts — engineering (tracks 1, 2, 4, 11, 16, 17)
- Danny Romero — engineering (track 6), mixing (tracks 5–6)
- Anette Sharvit — production coordination (tracks 5, 6, 9, 15)
- Ricore Shelton — production coordination (track 17)
- Jon Smeltz — engineering (tracks 12–14)
- Thom Storr — CD packaging
- Frank Sutton — engineering (tracks 7–8)
- John Tanksley — engineering (assistant) (tracks 5, 6, 9), mixing (assistant) (track 6)
- Carl Thompson — mixing (track 4)

== Charts ==
Chart (2005)	Peak position
US Top R&B/Hip-Hop Albums (Billboard)	62
