= Sorry (Rick Ross song) =

Single by Rick Ross featuring Chris Brown

from the album Black Market
- Released: October 9, 2015
- Recorded: 2015
- Genre: Hip hop; R&B
- Length: 4:40 (single/radio edit): 5:40 (album version)
- Label: Def Jam
- Songwriters: William L. Roberts II; Chris Brown; Scott S. Storch; Diego Avendano
- Producer: Scott Storch

Rick Ross singles chronology
"When You Feel This" (2015)	"Sorry" (2015)	"Make It Work" (2016)

Chris Brown singles chronology
"Player" (2015)	"Sorry" (2015)	"Gold Slugs" (2015)

"Sorry" is a song by American hip hop recording artist Rick Ross, featuring vocals from American singer Chris Brown. This was released on October 9, 2015, as the first single from his eighth studio album Black Market. The song was produced by Scott Storch.

== Background and composition ==
"Sorry" has been described as a "vulnerable" track, where Ross and Brown apologize to their respective girlfriends following their unfaithfulness. Brown's apology in the song is addressed to Karrueche Tran, his ex-girlfriend who broke up with him after discovering that the singer unwittingly fathered a child with another woman. Speaking of the song, Ross described it as a "personal" track "who speaks for itself", while Brown said:

One of the most honest records I’ve done in a while. I appreciate Ross for allowing me to be on [the] record and speak from the heart.

== Music video ==
On November 12, 2015 Ross uploaded the music video for "Sorry" on his YouTube and Vevo account.

== Live performances ==
On December 7, 2015, Ross and Brown performed the song live on the Jimmy Kimmel Live!.

== Charts ==
Chart (2015)	Peak position
US Billboard Hot 100	97
US Hot R&B/Hip-Hop Songs (Billboard)	32
US R&B/Hip-Hop Airplay (Billboard)	18
US Rhythmic Airplay (Billboard)	39

== Certifications ==
Region	Certification	Certified units/sales
United States (RIAA)	Gold	500,000^{‡}
^{‡} Sales+streaming figures based on certification alone.
