= The Once and Future =

Studio album by Jazzyfatnastees
- Released: August 31, 1999
- Studios: The Studio, Philadelphia; Ivory Studios, Philadelphia; Sony Music Studios
- Genres: Hip hop soul; R&B; neo soul
- Length: 46:37
- Labels: Motive; MCA
- Producers: ?uestlove; Anthony Tidd; James Gray; Larry Gold; Melvin Lewis; Mercedes Martinez; Rich Nichols; Scott Storch; Shaquil Rashad

Jazzyfatnastees chronology
The Once and Future (1999)	The Tortoise & the Hare (2002)

Singles from The Once and Future
- 1. "The Wound" Released: 2000

The Once and Future is the debut studio album by American R&B duo Jazzyfatnastees. Recorded after the group lost two members and moved from Los Angeles to Philadelphia, the hip-hop soul and R&B record draws influence from retro soul and includes instrumentation and production by The Roots. The album's lyrical themes include love, motherhood, and the state of the world.

The album was released on August 31, 1999, by the Roots' MCA Records imprint, Motive, becoming the imprint's first release. "The Wound" was released as the album's lead single in 2000. The album was well received by music critics, who singled out the album's first half as a highlight and considered "The Wound" to be among the best tracks. The group further received two nominations at the 2000 Soul Train Lady of Soul Awards, both for "The Wound".

Jazzyfatnastees expressed disappointment with MCA's treatment of the album, suggesting that the label was unsure of how to promote it. They used promotional funds to start and promote Black Lily, a music event to draw attention to independent artists. The Once and Future was the group's only release on MCA/Motive, with the group moving to an independent label for their second album.

== Background ==
The group began as a Los Angeles-based quartet and signed with Tommy Boy in 1993. Billboard reported in January 1994 that Jazzyfatnastees' debut album would be among the first releases of Fat House Wreckords, an indie label distributed by Tommy Boy. However, the group left Tommy Boy in 1995 and lost two members, resulting in a duo consisting of Mercedes Martinez and Tracey Moore. Martinez and Moore remained in Los Angeles for a time, recording with producers who were willing to work for free, but after connecting with Philadelphia-based hip-hop group The Roots, moved to Philadelphia and collaborated on their third studio album, Illadelph Halflife (1996).

Jazzyfatnastees gained attention as backing vocalists for artists including The Pharcyde, Outkast, Meshell Ndegeocello, De La Soul, Stevie Wonder, and The Roots. Through their work with The Roots, they came to be known as part of the group's "extended family", and signed to their MCA imprint, Motive. Martinez also befriended Roots manager Rich Nichols, who would produce The Once and Future and whom she would eventually marry.

== Composition ==
Stylistically, the album draws on R&B, hip hop soul, and jazz, with Billboard noting that it differed from contemporary hip-hop sounds. The album preceded the neo soul movement, coming out about a year after Erykah Badu's Baduizm but before widespread adoption of the term. A critic for Time described the album's sound as "Roberta Flack plus Sade with a little D'Angelo thrown in". In a single review, Billboard deemed the track "The Wound" to be "jazz-flavored soul" and stylistically similar to Olu, Amel Larrieux, and Erykah Badu. Much of the album includes instrumentation by The Roots. The first half consists of "retro soul"-influenced songs, while the second half contains ballads and solo performances by Martinez and Moore.

Lyrically, the album explores themes including romance and societal issues. "Hear Me" is sung from the point of view of a woman to "the child in my womb", commenting on societal issues ("beggars beggin', widows cryin', schemers, children dyin'") but assuring the child that "I know we can find a way".

== Release and promotion ==
The album was released on August 31, 1999, by MCA Records. It was the first album to be released on the Motive imprint. It would be Jazzyfatnastees' only release on MCA/Motive, with the group moving to independent label Cool Hunter for their second album.

Moore and Martinez felt that MCA was not supportive of their album. Moore told Billboard in 2002 that MCA "weren't very supportive of what we were trying to do", and that the label attempted to cut off funding for the recording of their follow-up to The Once and Future. In a 2004 interview with AllHipHop, Martinez reflected that when label executives heard the album, "we could tell that we weren’t gona put the kind of representation and support we were gona need behind it, 'cause they were like 'this is nice'. […] So MCA was like what kind of record is this, it’s not exactly regular, where are we gonna categorize it, etcetera." As they believed the label would not promote the album properly, they decided to spend their marketing budget on promoting Black Lily, a music event focused on promoting independent artists. The event started in New York before moving to Philadelphia, with later Black Lily events taking place in London.

== Reception ==
In the December 4, 1999, issue of Billboard, the album received a "critics' choice" designation. AllMusic labeled The Once and Future as an "album pick" from the group's discography, calling it "a solid record of hip-hop soul", singling out "The Wound" as a highlight and commending the way that the album "looks to the past as well as the future". Christopher John Farley, writing for Time, praised the album as "fabulously smooth, good from start to finish". In a review for Exclaim!, critic Del F. Cowie praised the album's first half for containing "harmonic retro-soul gems" such as "Unconventional Ways", "Hear Me", and "The Wound", but criticized the latter half as "disrupt[ing] the disc's early high standards".

At the 2000 Soul Train Lady of Soul Awards, the group's single "The Wound" was nominated in two categories: Best Single by a Group, Band or Duo, and Best New Artist, Group.

== Track listing ==
No.	Title	Writer(s)	Producer(s)	Length
1.	"The Wound"	Mercedes Martinez; Tracey Moore; Melvin Lewis; Scott Storch	James Gray; Lewis; Rich Nichols; Storch	4:49
2.	"How Sad"	Martinez; Nou Ra; Dan Raaf; Shaquil Rashad; Storch	Nichols; ?uestlove; Rashad; Storch	4:20
3.	"Breakthrough"	Moore; Storch	Larry Gold; Moore; Nichols; Storch	5:46
4.	"Unconventional Ways"	Martinez; Moore; Storch	?uestlove; Nichols; Storch	5:10
5.	"Hear Me"	Moore; Storch	Moore; Nichols; Storch	4:29
6.	"Sail the Seas"	Moore; Anthony Tidd	Moore; Tidd	4:32
7.	"Related to Me"	Martinez; Storch	Martinez; Nichols; Storch	3:22
8.	"The Lie"	Martinez; Moore; Tidd	?uestlove; Tidd	3:30
9.	"Why"	Martinez; Storch	Nichols; Storch	3:57
10.	"Let It Go"	Martinez; Moore; Storch	Nichols; Storch	6:42
Total length:				46:37

== Credits ==
Adapted from album liner notes.

Studios

- Recorded at The Studio, Philadelphia; Ivory Studios, Philadelphia; and Sony Music Studios, New York
- Mixed at The Studio, Philadelphia, and Sony Music Studios, New York

Musicians

- Chalmers Alford — guitar (4, 5, 7); bass (7)
- Davis Barnett — viola (5, 9)
- Diane Barnett — violin (5, 9)
- Danophonic Dan — guitar (1, 2, 8)
- Julia DiGaetaui — viola (5, 9)
- Emma Fummrow — violin (5, 9)
- Larry Gold — cello (1–3, 5–9); string arrangement (5–9)
- Leonard Hubbard — bass (1–3, 7, 10)
- David Ivory — guitar (10)
- Olga Konopelsky — violin (5, 9)
- Charlene Kwas — violin (5, 9)
- Melvin Lewis — drum programming (1, 7, 10)
- Mercedes Martinez — lead vocals; production; vocal arrangement (9)
- Tracey Moore — lead vocals; production; vocal arrangement (5, 9)
- Richard Nichols — string arrangement (1, 3)
- Arlynn Page — vocal arrangement (5)
- Charles Parker — violin (5, 9)
- Scott Storch — electric piano (1–4, 7, 10); keyboards (5); Wurlitzer (5)
- Igor Szwec — violin (5, 9)
- Ahmir "?uestlove" Thompson — drums (2–5, 8)
- Anthony Tidd — piano (6), Wurlitzer (8), bass (8), string arrangement (8)
- Chuck Treece — bass (1, 4)

Technical

- Jim Botarri — assistant engineering (1)
- Jim Caruana — assistant engineering (2–5, 7, 9, 10), recording (2, 8)
- David Ivory — recording (1, 3, 4, 10)
- Carlos "Storm" Martinez — assistant engineering (1–3, 6–8, 10)
- Rich Nichols — mixing (2–10), recording (5)
- Axel Niehaus — mixing (4, 5, 9), recording (2–7, 9)
- "Lord Jon" Smeltz — mixing (1–3, 6–8, 10), recording (1, 6–10)
