= Black Market (Rick Ross album) =

Studio album by Rick Ross
- Released: December 4, 2015
- Recorded: 2015
- Genre: Hip hop
- Length: 60:16
- Labels: Maybach; Def Jam
- Producers: Rick Ross (exec.); 8 Bars; Antman Wonder; Black Metaphor; Ben Billions; Beat Billionaire; Calvo da Gr8; Cirkut; D. Rich; Diego Ave; Dreek Beatz; DP Beats; DJ Khaled; DJ Mustard; Isiah Salazar; Jake One; J.U.S.T.I.C.E. League; Jahlil Beats; J.R. Rotem; JP Did This 1; S1; StreetRunner; Scott Storch; Tarik Azzouz

Rick Ross chronology
Black Dollar (2015)	Black Market (2015)	Rather You Than Me (2017)

Singles from Black Market
- 1. "Foreclosures" Released: September 23, 2015; 2. "Sorry" Released: October 9, 2015

Black Market is the eighth studio album by American rapper Rick Ross. The album was released on December 4, 2015, by Maybach Music Group and Def Jam Recordings. The album features guest appearances from John Legend, CeeLo Green, Nas, DJ Premier, Mariah Carey, Mary J. Blige, Chris Brown, Future and The-Dream.

== Background ==
In November 2015, in an interview with Billboard, he spoke about the album, saying: "You know, this album is, I feel like, most definitely gonna be a Rozay on a higher, intellectual level, just discussing a different array of things. When you listen to records like "Foreclosure," that's like me sitting in a room by myself just rapping about things that's running across my mind and things that have been bothering me. And during my incarceration, that was the type of music I created. Just in that short moment of time, I really just sat there... I'm a muthafucka that flies six million miles a year and just to halt one day, out of the blue, for three weeks? It's just, "Woah." There's a lot of shit that I wrote and a lot of shit that I thought about. I came back out and scrapped a lot of music and I recorded some dope songs, but my first day home I recorded six records. So that's why I was able to put out the Black Dollar record and have been releasing a slew of freestyles, just feeding the fans and everybody that's been asking for that Rozay music."

== Singles ==
The album's lead single, "Foreclosures" was released on September 23, 2015. The album's second single, "Sorry" was released on October 9, 2015. The song features guest vocals from American recording artist Chris Brown and is produced by Scott Storch. On November 12, 2015, the music video was released for "Sorry".

== Critical reception ==
Professional ratings
Aggregate scores
Source	Rating
Metacritic	61/100
Review scores
Source	Rating
AllMusic	4/5 stars
HipHopDX	4/5 stars
Pitchfork Media	7.0/10
PopMatters	5/10 stars
Rolling Stone	2.5/5 stars
Tiny Mix Tapes	2/5 stars

Black Market received generally positive reviews from music critics. At Metacritic, which assigns a normalized rating out of 100 to reviews from mainstream critics, the album received an average score of 61, based on 9 reviews, which indicates "generally positive reviews". David Jeffries of AllMusic said, "This Miami Don remains an unapologetic and indefensible brute -- and he says as much on this very LP -- but this rough, honest, and ambitious work is like his Raging Bull, taking the listener on a compelling, dirty journey that's also a connectable character study, and then letting some slick Chris Brown ("Sorry") and Future ("D.O.P.E") features play while the credits roll." Scott Glaysher of HipHopDX said, "All in all, Black Market does its job. It doesn’t hit as hard as some previous albums, but it surely proves just how good Rick Ross can be as a songwriter and collaborator. It also proves how sharp he has become as a rapper. There may not be a thundering single that the album is built around, but, for the most part, Ross’s consistency fills that gap quite nicely." Julian Kimble of Pitchfork Media stated, "The motivated, slightly weary Ross heard on Black Market—which has no MMG features—is a better fit for the moment than the bulletproof supervillain of old. Ross has proven his resilience in the past; maybe carefully controlled doses of reality are just what he needs to move forward."

== Commercial performance ==
In the United States, the album debuted at number 6 on the Billboard 200, with 65,000 album-equivalent units (54,000 copies of pure sales) in its first week.

== Track listing ==
Black Market – Standard version
No.	Title	Writer(s)	Producer(s)	Length
1.	"Free Enterprise" (featuring John Legend)	William Roberts II; Nicholas Warwar; Tarik Azzouz; Khaled Khaled; John Stephens; Kevin Cossom; Lee Fields; David Guy; Leon Michels; Nick Movshon; Toby Pazner; Jeffrey Silverman	StreetRunner; Azzouz; DJ Khaled	4:19
2.	"Smile Mama, Smile" (featuring CeeLo Green)	Roberts II; Jacob Dutton; Thomas Callaway; Bruce Hawes; Joseph Jefferson; Tony Pizarro; Joseph Sample; Tupac Shakur; Charles Simmons; Terence Thomas	Jake One	4:01
3.	"One of Us" (featuring Nas)	Roberts II; Calvin Kenon, Jr.; Nasir Jones	Calvo da Gr8	3:13
4.	"Silk Road"	Roberts II; Benjamin Diehl; Lukasz Gottwald; Henry Walter	Ben Billions; Cirkut^{[b]}	4:21
5.	"Color Money"	Roberts II; Dwayne Richardson	D. Rich	3:06
6.	"Dope Dick"	Roberts II; Dutton; Allan Felder; Bunny Sigler; Norman Harris	Jake One	4:44
7.	"Crocodile Python"	Roberts II; Orlando Tucker; Anthony Reid; Burt Bacharach; Hal David; Osten Harvey, Jr.; Christopher Wallace	Jahlil Beats; Antman Wonder	4:40
8.	"Ghostwriter"	Roberts II; Richardson	D. Rich	4:27
9.	"Black Opium" (featuring DJ Premier)	Roberts II; Byron Forest II; Christopher Martin; Alessandro Alessandroni; Rashia Fisher; Leroy Jones; William Lewis; Roger McNair; Trevor Smith; Ricardo Thomas	Black Metaphor	3:55
10.	"Can't Say No" (featuring Mariah Carey)	Roberts II; J.R. Rotem; Walter Afanasieff; Mariah Carey	J.R. Rotem	3:30
11.	"Peace Sign"	Roberts II; Dijon McFarlane; Jermaine Denny; Isiah Salazar	DJ Mustard; Salazar	4:50
12.	"Very Best" (featuring Mary J. Blige)	Roberts II; Earl Johnson; Mary J. Blige; Bob James; Atia Boggs	JP Did This 1	4:56
13.	"Sorry" (featuring Chris Brown)	Christopher Brown; Roberts II; Scott Storch; Diego Avendano	Scott Storch; Diego Ave	5:30
14.	"D.O.P.E." (featuring Future)	Roberts II; Don Paschall; Denny; Nayvadius Wilburn; Quavious Marshall; Kirsnick Ball; Kiari Cephus	DP Beats	4:44
Total length:				60:16

Black Market – Deluxe version (bonus tracks)
No.	Title	Writer(s)	Producer(s)	Length
15.	"Foreclosures"	Roberts II; Erik Ortiz; Kevin Crowe; Kenny Bartolomei; Jason Carr	J.U.S.T.I.C.E. League; 8 Bars	4:14
16.	"Money Dance" (featuring The-Dream)	Roberts II; Dutton; Larry Griffin, Jr.; Christopher Thornton; Diondria Thornton; Terius Nash	Jake One; S1^{[a]}	7:37
17.	"Carol City"	Roberts II; Shamann Cooke; Rodrickus Hill	Beat Billionaire; Dreek Beatz	4:13
Total length:				76:20

Notes

- ^{^[a]} signifies a co-producer
- ^{^[b]} signifies an additional producer
- "Silk Road" features additional vocals from Teedra Moses.
- "Peace Sign" features additional vocals from Red Café.
- "Foreclosures" features additional vocals from Kenneth Bartolomei.

== Charts ==
=== Weekly charts ===
Chart (2015)	Peak position
US Billboard 200	6
US Top R&B/Hip-Hop Albums (Billboard)	2

=== Year-end charts ===
Chart (2016)	Position
US Billboard 200	179
US Top R&B/Hip-Hop Albums (Billboard)	21
