= The Roots Come Alive =

Live album by The Roots
- Released: November 2, 1999
- Recorded: Zürich, Switzerland; New York City
- Genre: Hip hop
- Length: 74:07 (standard edition); 92:22 (limited edition)
- Labels: MCA/Universal Records; 112 129 (limited edition); 112 059 (standard edition)

The Roots chronology
The Legendary (1999)	The Roots Come Alive (1999)	Jay-Z: Unplugged (2001)

Professional ratings
Review scores
Source	Rating
Allmusic	4/5 stars
Robert Christgau	(2-star Honorable Mention)
Drowned in Sound	(9/10)
Entertainment Weekly	(A−)
Pitchfork Media	(5.7/10)
Rolling Stone	3.5/5 stars
The Rolling Stone Album Guide	4/5 stars
Spin	4/5 stars
Vibe	(favorable)
Yahoo! Music	(favorable)

The Roots Come Alive is a live album from the group The Roots.

It was recorded in Zürich, Switzerland; New York City; and other places and released November 2, 1999. An enhanced double-CD edition containing six extra tracks, music videos and photos was also released with a limited pressing.

== Track listing ==
Continuation from The Legendary

No.	Title	Length
77.	"Live at the T-Connection"	0:47
78.	"The Next Movement"	3:49
79.	"Step into the Realm"	3:26
80.	"Proceed"	2:44
81.	"Mellow My Man / Jusufckwithis"	5:02
82.	"Love of My Life" (featuring Common)	3:43
83.	"The Ultimate"	3:57
84.	"Don't See Us"	5:21
85.	"100% Dundee"	4:30
86.	"Adrenaline!" (featuring Dice Raw)	6:10
87.	"Essaywhuman?!???!!!"	5:15
88.	"Silent Treatment"	7:19
89.	"The Notic"	4:28
90.	"You Got Me / Encore (hidden track) / (untitled hidden track)" (featuring Jill Scott)	17:14
91.	"What You Want" (featuring Jaguar)	4:08
92.	"We Got You" (featuring Jaguar)	0:38
93.	"The Lesson – Part III (It's Over Now)" (featuring Dice Raw and Jaguar)	4:00

Limited edition CD1
No.	Title	Length
1.	"Live at the T-Connection"	0:47
2.	"The Next Movement"	3:49
3.	"Step into the Realm"	3:26
4.	"Proceed"	2:44
5.	"Mellow My Man / Jusufckwithis"	5:02
6.	"Love of My Life" (featuring Common)	3:43
7.	"The Ultimate"	3:57
8.	"Don't See Us"	5:21
9.	"100% Dundee"	4:30
10.	"Adrenaline!" (featuring Dice Raw)	6:10
11.	"Essaywhuman?!???!!!"	5:15
12.	"Silent Treatment"	7:19
13.	"The Notic"	4:28
14.	"You Got Me" (featuring Jill Scott)	9:47
15.	"Encore"	3:39
16.	"(untitled hidden track)"	2:51

Limited edition CD2
No.	Title	Length
1.	"What You Want" (featuring Jaguar)	4:08
2.	"We Got You" (featuring Jaguar)	0:38
3.	"The Lesson – Part III (It's Over Now)" (featuring Dice Raw and Jaguar)	4:00
4.	"All I Know"	4:02
5.	"Ya'll Know Who" (featuring Craig Harris on didjeridoo)	3:31
6.	"For the Love of Money" (featuring Cash Money on the wons & toos)	2:06

== Album chart positions ==
Year	Album	Chart positions	
Year	Album	Billboard 200	Top R&B/Hip Hop Albums
1999	The Roots Come Alive	No. 50	No. 12
