= From the Ground Up (The Roots EP) =

EP by The Roots
- Released: 1994
- Genre: Hip-hop
- Length: 32:50
- Label: Talkin' Loud (UK); Geffen (US)
- Producer: AJ Shine; Anthony Tidd; Black Thought; Kelo; Questlove

The Roots chronology
Organix (1993)	From the Ground Up (1994)	Do You Want More?!!!??! (1995)

From the Ground Up is an EP released by the Roots in 1994. It featured four songs that would appear on their album, Do You Want More?!!!??!

Professional ratings
Review scores
Source	Rating
Loaded	(Positive)
RapReviews	8/10
Tom Hull – on the Web	B+

== Track listing ==
1. "It's Comin'" – 6:31
2. "Distortion to Static" – 4:26
3. "Mellow My Man" – 4:49
4. "Dat Scat" – 5:19
5. "Worldwide (London Groove)" – 8:16
6. "Do You Want More?!" – 3:29
