= The Legendary =

EP by the Roots
- Released: July 20, 1999
- Genre: Hip-hop
- Label: MCA

The Roots chronology
Things Fall Apart (1999)	The Legendary (1999)	The Roots Come Alive (1999)

The Legendary is an EP released by the Roots on July 20, 1999.

== Track listing ==
Continuation from Things Fall Apart

No.	Title	Length
72.	"Intro / Jusufckwithis"	2:14
73.	"Table of Contents – (Part 3)"	3:05
74.	"The Ultimate"	4:05
75.	"The Battlestar ?uestacula (Part 3 – The Search for Scratch)"	2:12
76.	"The Next Movement"	3:53

Recorded live at Palais X-Tra, Zurich, Switzerland, May 6, 1999.
