= Jaguar Wright =

American singer and songwriter

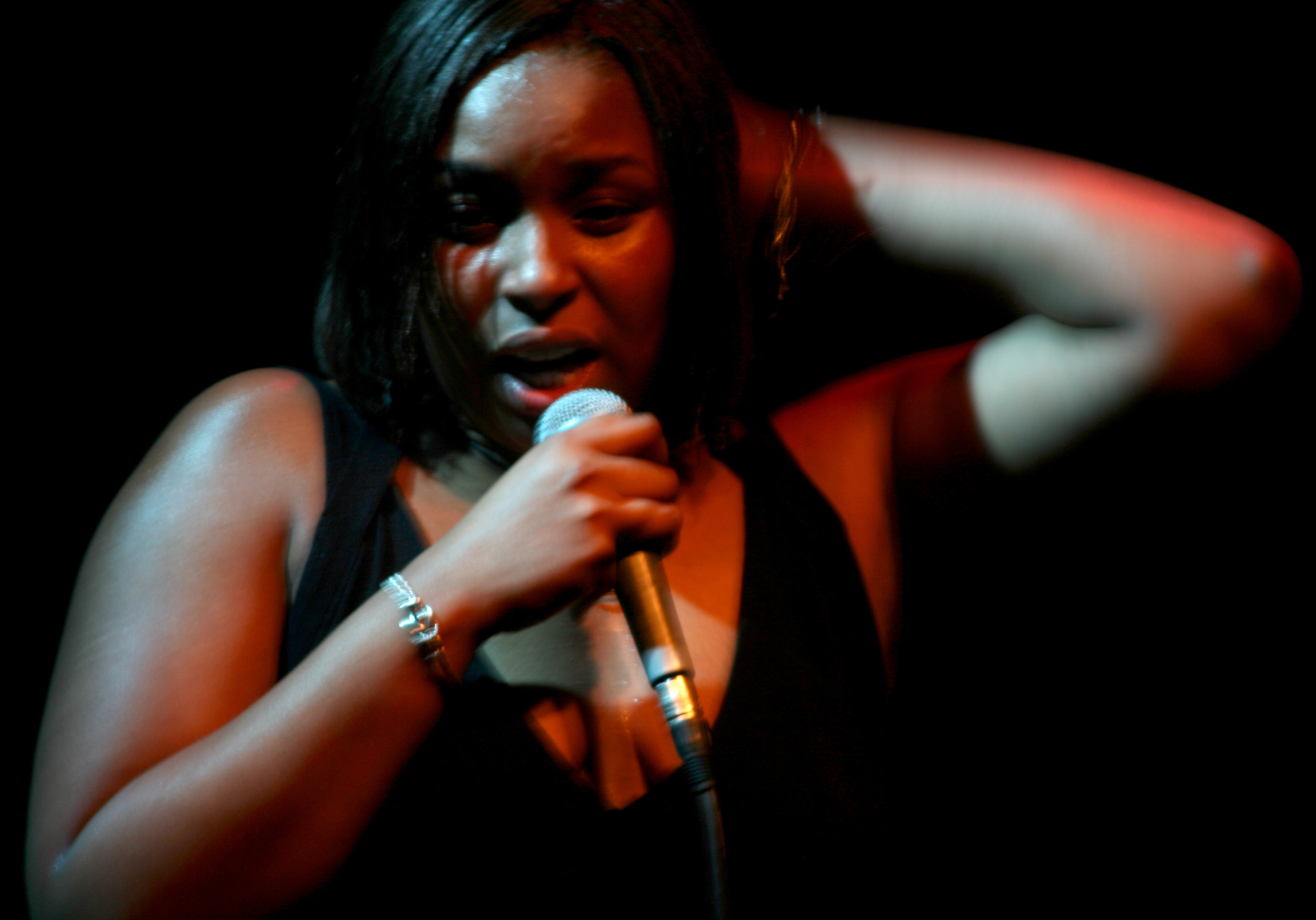
- Wright performing in January 2008

Background information
- Born: Jacquelyn Suzette Wright; May 17, 1977 (age 49)
- Genres: R&B; neo soul; hip hop soul; spoken word
- Occupations: Singer; songwriter
- Instrument: Vocals
- Years active: 1995–present

Jacquelyn Suzette Wright is an American singer and songwriter. She has released five studio albums and is part of the Okayplayer collective. Wright has performed and collaborated alongside rap acts such as the Roots, Jay-Z, and Blackalicious.

== Career ==
Wright was brought to the attention of hip-hop group the Roots in 1998, which eventually led to her going on tour with them. She later appeared on MTV Unplugged as a back-up singer for Jay-Z in 2001, and was featured in a Coca-Cola advert as part of the brand's "Nu Soul" campaign. She has released two solo albums to date: Denials Delusions and Decisions in 2002, and Divorcing Neo 2 Marry Soul in 2005. Wright also recorded an album titled ...And Your Point Is? which was due for release in 2003 on MCA Records (who also distributed her debut), before the label folded. Many of the tracks recorded for that album later appeared on Divorcing Neo 2 Marry Soul, which debuted at number 62 on the Top R&B/Hip-Hop Albums chart in July 2005.

In March 2008, she toured Europe with Bahamadia and Hezekiah for the "Philly Sounds" tour. Wright did not perform any new material on the tour, but did live cover versions of Cherrelle's "Saturday Love" and Crystal Waters' "Gypsy Woman (She's Homeless)". During the tour, Wright announced that she was in the process of writing a novel, and working on a third album. No release dates have been confirmed for either as of yet. In February 2010, Vibe reported that her third album, titled 3D, was slated for a summer release, and was the outgrowth of what she'd planned as a five-track digital EP. The lead single, "Beautiful", was released in Fall 2009.

In 2019, Wright released the 5-song EP Lost on Bandcamp. In 2020, Wright made headlines via social media regarding issues such as the trajectory of her music career, her fallout with several members of the Roots, and her grievances with artists such as Jill Scott, Erykah Badu and Mary J. Blige, as well as a claim that her then boyfriend Common sexually assaulted her after performing a concert in the mid-2000s. Wright subsequently apologized to Tiffany Haddish, who was dating Common at the time, for causing her distress with the allegation.

In October 2024, Wright appeared on the talk show Piers Morgan Uncensored, where she was termed a Sean "Diddy" Combs whistleblower. After the show aired, Morgan issued a public apology to Jay-Z and Beyonce for Wright's allegations about the superstar couple during his broadcast. The couple's attorney, Alex Spiro, responded to the controversy, stating, "There are rumors, and then there’s nonsense, and this is one step further. This is a formal and pointed accusation of something." Spiro further criticized the decision to air Wright's claims, arguing that such "random rumor mill" content harms real victims. In February 2025, Wright received the "Defender of Freedom Award" presented by General Michael Flynn at President Donald Trump's Mar-a-Lago resort.

In April 2025, Brian McKnight sued Wright for defamation over abuse and prostitution claims. According to the lawsuit, McKnight claims that Wright has been spreading blatant lies about him online, including serious allegations that he physically assaulted sex workers during intimate encounters. McKnight has denied Wright's allegations.

== Discography ==
=== Studio albums ===
List of albums, with selected chart positions, sales figures and certifications
Title	Album details	Peak chart positions		
Title	Album details	US	US R&B /HH	US Indie
Denials Delusions and Decisions	Released: January 29, 2002; Label: MCA (#MCAF-25571-2)(#088 112 683–1); Formats: CD, vinyl, digital download	56	16	—
Divorcing Neo 2 Marry Soul	Released: July 12, 2005; Labels: Rykodisc (#RCD 17312), Artemis (#ATM-CD-51611), Song; Formats: CD, digital download	—	53	35

=== Unreleased albums ===
List of albums, with selected details
Title	Album details
...And Your Point Is?	Release scheduled: 2003; Label: MCA

=== Singles ===
==== As lead artist ====
List of singles as a lead artist, with selected chart positions, sales figures and certifications
Title	Year	Chart positions	Album
Title	Year	US Adult R&B	Album
"Ain't Nobody Playin'" (featuring Black Thought)	2001	—	Denials Delusions and Decisions
"I Can't Wait" (featuring Bilal)	2001	—	Denials Delusions and Decisions
"The What If's"	2002	24	Denials Delusions and Decisions
"Free"	2005	—	Divorcing Neo 2 Marry Soul
"Beautiful"	2011	—	Non-album singles
"Switch (Make Change)"	2011	—	Non-album singles
"YDKM" (Rokbottom, Tone Trump, Jaguar Wright & JJ Demon)	2012	—	Non-album singles
"My Choice (It's You)"	2014	—	Non-album singles

==== As featured artist ====
List of singles as a featured artist, with selected chart positions, sales figures and certifications
Title	Year	Chart positions			Album
Title	Year	US R&B /HH	US Adult R&B	US Rap	Album
"What You Want" (The Roots featuring Jaguar Wright)	1999	82	24	32	Denials Delusions and Decisions
"Do You Know" (Mike Watts featuring Jaguar Wright)	2002	—	—	—	Vol. 1
"Ghetto Love Story" (Deucez Wyled featuring Jaguar Wright)	2016	—	—	—	Non-album singles
"All in My Head" (The Boom Room Church Music featuring Jaguar Wright)	2016	—	—	—	Non-album singles

=== Album appearances ===
Title	Year	Artist(s)	Album
"What You Want"	1999	The Roots (featuring Jaguar Wright)	The Roots Come Alive
"We Got You"	1999	The Roots (featuring Jaguar Wright)	The Roots Come Alive
"The Lesson, Pt. 3 (It's Over Now)"	1999	The Roots (featuring Jaguar Wright)	The Roots Come Alive
"Raw Sex"	2000	Dice Raw	Reclaiming the Dead
"You Not the One"	2000	Dice Raw	Reclaiming the Dead
"Izzo (H.O.V.A.)"	2001	Jay-Z	MTV Unplugged
"Takeover"	2001	Jay-Z	MTV Unplugged
"Girls, Girls, Girls"	2001	Jay-Z	MTV Unplugged
"Jigga What, Jigga Who"	2001	Jay-Z	MTV Unplugged
"Big Pimpin'"	2001	Jay-Z	MTV Unplugged
"Heart of the City (Ain't No Love)"	2001	Jay-Z	MTV Unplugged
"Can I Get A ..."	2001	Jay-Z	MTV Unplugged
"Hard Knock Life (The Ghetto Anthem)"	2001	Jay-Z	MTV Unplugged
"Ain't No"	2001	Jay-Z	MTV Unplugged
"Can't Knock the Hustle / Family Affair"	2001	Jay-Z (featuring Mary J Blige)	MTV Unplugged
"Song Cry"	2001	Jay-Z	MTV Unplugged
"I Just Wanna Love U (Give It to Me)"	2001	Jay-Z (featuring Pharrell)	MTV Unplugged
"Jigga That Nigga"	2001	Jay-Z	MTV Unplugged
"Fight to Win"	2001	Femi Kuti (featuring Jaguar Wright)	Fight to Win
"Aural Pleasure"	2002	Blackalicious (featuring Jaguar Wright)	Blazing Arrow
"Nothin'"	2003	Larry Gold (featuring Jaguar Wright)	Presents Don Cello and Friends
"Let's Do It Again"	2003	Gerald Veasley (featuring Jaguar Wright)	Velvet
"Talk to Me"	2005	Guru (featuring Jaguar Wright)	Version 7.0: The Street Scriptures
"Do U Know?"	2006	Mike Watts (featuring Jaguar Wright)	Pandora's Box
"I See Yaw"	2007	Hezekiah (featuring Jaguar Wright)	I predict a riot
"Lila"	2008	Curse (featuring Jaguar Wright)	Freiheit
"How Ya Doing?"	2010	Ground Up (featuring Jaguar Wright)	Girls Who Smoke Cigarettes
"Skit 2"	2013	Sizzle Pop and Jaguar Wright	Full Circle - Return of the Underground
"One More Drink - Neal Conway Re-Werk"	2013	Jaguar Wright	Neal Conway Classics Revisited, Vol. 2
"So Good (Amazing)"	2015	Terri Lyne Carrington (featuring Jaguar Wright)	The Mosaic Project: Love and Soul
"Inspired"	2015	ill Clinton (featuring Jaguar Wright and Moses West)	Presents: Vol. 2
"All Night Long"	2015	David P Stevens (featuring Jaguar Wright)	Mr. Guitar
"Switch (Make Change)"	2017	Jaguar Wright (featuring Peedi Crakk)	Volume 1
"KOS"	2019	Rakim Al-Jabbaar (featuring Rikki Blu and Jaguar Wright)	Underground GOD
"Trill God"	2019	Rakim Al-Jabbaar (featuring Jaguar Wright)	Underground GOD
