= Jazzyfatnastees =

American girl group

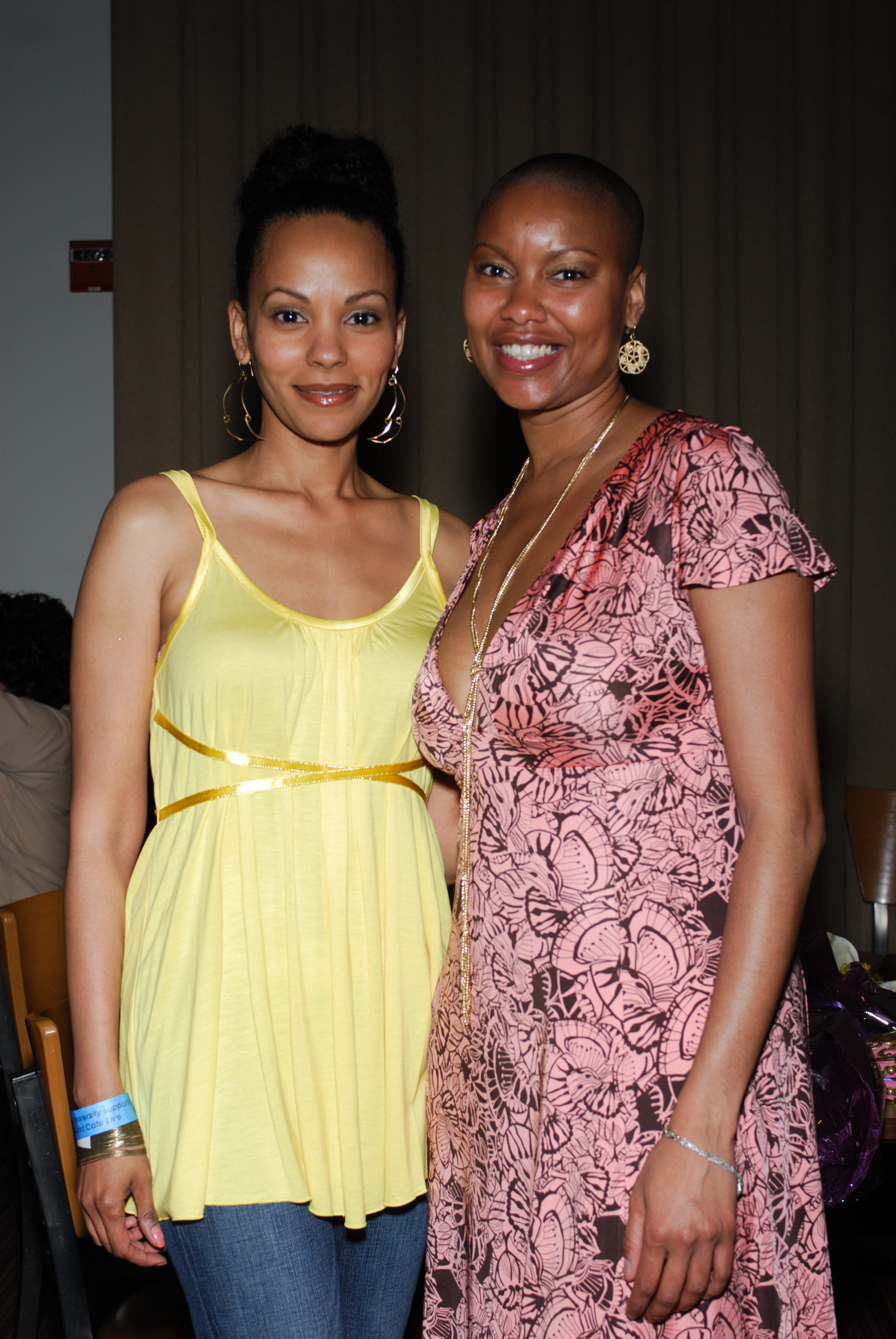
- Jazzyfatnastees at the Black Lily Film & Music Festival 2007. Photo by Simba Madziva.

Background information
- Origin: Los Angeles, USA
- Genres: Neo soul, R&B
- Years active: 1992–2014
- Label: Coolhunter
- Members: Mercedes Martinez; Tracey Moore
- Past members: Stevvi Alexander; Arlynn Page

Jazzyfatnastees is a vocal duo, Tracey Moore (born 1970) and Mercedes Martinez (born 1969). Originally a vocal quartet, they landed a deal with Tommy Boy in 1993. In 1997, their contract with Tommy Boy ended, two other members Stevvi Alexander and Arlynn Page left the group, and the current duo moved to Philadelphia. When the group was still a quartet they appeared along with many other 90's African-American R&B and Hip Hop girl groups in the song "Freedom (Theme from Panther)" on the Panther soundtrack such as En Vogue, SWV, TLC, Xscape, For Real, Brownstone, Jade, Y?N-Vee, Salt-N-Pepa, Female, BlackGirl, Changing Faces, Zhané, Terri & Monica and several other African American R&B and Hip-Hop girl groups. The soundtrack also featured African American female solo artist and female solo rappers and was released on May 2, 1995. In 1996, while still under contract with Tommy Boy the quartet appeared on a 4-Track CD single "De La Soul 4 More Featuring Zhané" which was released under Tommy Boy Records and the quartet released a song on the single titled "Baby Baby Baby Baby Ooh Baby"

== Career ==
When the group was numbered down to a duo with only Mercedes Martinez and Tracey Moore they released their debut album, The Once and Future on October 26, 1999. The duo wrote and co-produced the album in conjunction with members of The Roots. Helping to feed the neo-soul movement, the women started Black Lily, "A Women in Music Series." The series acts as a showcase for neo-soul artists including Alicia Keys, Jill Scott, and Bilal.

In addition to recording their own albums, they have toured with and sung background vocals for The Roots (Illadelph Halflife, Things Fall Apart; Martinez appeared on Game Theory, Rising Down, and …And Then You Shoot Your Cousin).

The Tortoise and The Hare, the group's second album, was released in September 2002 through Coolhunter/Ryko.

== Discography ==
Studio albums

- The Once and Future (1999)
- The Tortoise & the Hare (2002)
- The World Is Coming (2005)

The World Is Coming was originally titled Let It Be Mine and was slated for a 1 March 2005 release; however, it was not released until 2009, online.
