= Do You Want More?!!!??! =

Studio album by the Roots
- Released: January 17, 1995
- Recorded: 1993–1994
- Studios: The Trocadero, Philadelphia; Sigma Sound - Ivory Studios Suite 3, Philadelphia; Nebula Sounds, Philadelphia; Battery, New York City
- Genre: Jazz rap
- Length: 73:45
- Labels: DGC; Geffen
- Producers: A.J. Shine; Black Thought; Kelo; Questlove; Rachel Graham; Rahzel; Sista Urban; The Grand Negaz

The Roots chronology
From the Ground Up (1994)	Do You Want More?!!!??! (1995)	Illadelph Halflife (1996)

Singles from Do You Want More?!!!??!
- 1. "Distortion to Static" Released: July 26, 1994; 2. "Proceed" Released: February 1995; 3. "Silent Treatment" Released: April 4, 1995

Professional ratings
Review scores
Source	Rating
AllMusic	4/5 stars
Chicago Tribune	3/4 stars
Entertainment Weekly	A
NME	7/10
Philadelphia Daily News	3/4 stars
The Philadelphia Inquirer	3.5/4 stars
Pitchfork	9.0/10
The Rolling Stone Album Guide	3.5/5 stars
The Source	4/5 stars
Spin	4/5 stars

Do You Want More?!!!??! is the second studio album by American hip-hop band the Roots, released January 17, 1995, on DGC Records. The band's major label-debut, it was released two years after their independent debut album, Organix (1993). Do You Want More?!!!??! has been considered by critics as a classic of jazz rap. In 1998, the album was selected as one of The Source's 100 Best Rap Albums. On November 2, 2015, twenty years after its release, the album was certified Gold by the Recording Industry Association of America for shipments of 500,000 units in the United States. The master tapes for the album, including some unreleased tracks, were destroyed in the 2008 Universal Studios fire.

== Track listing ==
No.	Title	Producer(s)	Length
18.	"Intro/There's Something Goin' On"	The Grand Negaz	1:18
19.	"Proceed"	The Grand Negaz	4:35
20.	"Distortion to Static"	Questlove; Kelo; A.J. Shine	4:18
21.	"Mellow My Man"	The Grand Negaz	4:41
22.	"I Remain Calm"	Black Thought; Questlove	4:08
23.	"Datskat"	The Grand Negaz	3:40
24.	"Lazy Afternoon"	Black Thought; Rahzel; Sista Urban; Rachel Graham	5:06
25.	"? vs. Rahzel"	Questlove; Rahzel	3:18
26.	"Do You Want More?!!!??!"	Black Thought; Questlove; A.J. Shine	3:21
27.	"What Goes On Pt. 7" (featuring ELO The Cosmic Eye)	The Grand Negaz	5:32
28.	"Essaywhuman?!!!??!" (recorded live at the Trocadero, December 15, 1993)	Questlove; Black Thought	4:59
29.	"Swept Away"	The Grand Negaz	3:50
30.	"You Ain't Fly"	The Grand Negaz	4:42
31.	"Silent Treatment" (featuring Cassandra Wilson)	The Grand Negaz	6:52
32.	"The Lesson Pt. 1" (featuring Dice Raw)	Questlove	5:12
33.	"The Unlocking" (featuring Ursula Rucker)	The Grand Negaz	8:11
Total length:			73:43

- The track listing on some album releases denotes the first track, "Intro/There's Something Goin' On," as track 18, continuing the track count from the band's 1993 album Organix, which contained 17 tracks. The track listing on this album continues from 18 upward to the album's final track, "The Unlocking" (track 33).

== Charts ==
=== Weekly charts ===
Chart (1995)	Peak position
US Billboard 200	104
US Top R&B/Hip-Hop Albums (Billboard)	22
US Heatseekers Albums (Billboard)	2

Chart (2021)	Peak position
UK R&B Albums (Official Charts)	18

=== Year-end charts ===
Chart (1995)	Position
US Top R&B/Hip-Hop Albums (Billboard)	98

== Certifications ==
Region	Certification	Certified units/sales
United States (RIAA)	Gold	500,000^{^}
^{^} Shipments figures based on certification alone.
