= Organix (album) =

Organix!
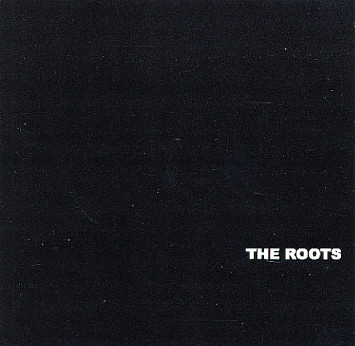

Studio album by the Roots
- Released: May 19, 1993
- Recorded: 1992–1993
- Genre: Old school hip-hop; jazz rap
- Length: 62:31
- Label: Self-released; Cargo Records (re-release)
- Producer: The Roots

The Roots chronology
| Organix! (1993) | From the Ground Up (1994) |

Professional ratings
Review scores
| Source | Rating |
|---|---|
| AllMusic | 3/5 stars |
| The Philadelphia Inquirer | (favorable) |
| RapReviews | 7/10 |
| The Rolling Stone Album Guide | 3/5 stars |
| Tom Hull – on the Web | B+ |
| Winston-Salem Journal | 4/4 stars |

Organix is the debut studio album by American hip-hop band the Roots, released in 1993 independently by the band. It was originally sold at the band's shows in Europe. The album earned enough industry buzz to earn the Roots offers from major record labels, after which they signed with DGC Records. Organix was re-released in 1998 on Cargo Records.

== Track listing ==
| No. | Title | Writer(s) | Notes | Length |
|---|---|---|---|---|
| 1. | "The Roots Is Comin'" | Tariq Trotter; Ahmir Thompson | | 1:15 |
| 2. | "Pass the Popcorn" | Trotter; Thompson; Kenyatta Warren; Joshua Abrams | | 5:31 |
| 3. | "The Anti-Circle" | Trotter; Thompson; Abrams | | 3:46 |
| 4. | "Writer's Block" | Trotter; Thompson; Leonard Hubbard | | 1:42 |
| 5. | "Good Music (Prelude)" | Trotter; Thompson | | 1:01 |
| 6. | "Good Music" | Trotter; Thompson | | 4:33 |
| 7. | "Grits" | Trotter; Thompson; Scott Storch; Malik Basset; Tony Greene; Jamal Dorsey | | 6:34 |
| 8. | "Leonard I-V" | Trotter; Thompson; Hubbard; Storch | | 4:05 |
| 9. | "I'm Out Deah" | Trotter; Thompson; Storch | | 4:08 |
| 10. | "Essawhamah? (Live at the SOULSHACK)" | Trotter; Thompson; Abrams; Hubbard; Storch | Recorded live in Slovenia, May 19, 1993 | 4:20 |
| 11. | "There's a Riot Going On" | Thompson; Sylvester Stewart | | 0:11 |
| 12. | "Popcorn Revisited" | Trotter; Thompson | | 4:03 |
| 13. | "Peace" | Trotter | | 1:14 |
| 14. | "Common Dust" | Trotter; Thompson; Abrams; Warren | | 5:02 |
| 15. | "The Session (Longest Posse Cut in History, 12:43)" | Trotter; A. Thompson; Storch; Hubbard; Basset; Teresa Thompson; Rohanee; Conway Armstead; Jamal Dorsey; Joseph Simmons; Micah Pitts; Tony Greene | | 12:43 |
| 16. | "Syreeta's Having My Baby" | Trotter; A. Thompson | | 0:43 |
| 17. | "Carryin' On" | Trotter; A. Thompson; Storch; Hubbard | Interpolates "Daydream" by The Lovin' Spoonful | 1:28 |
| Total length: | | | | 62:19 |

== Notes ==
- Nathan Brackett, Christian Hoard (2004). The New Rolling Stone Album Guide: Completely Revised and Updated 4th Edition. Simon and Schuster. ISBN 0-7432-0169-8.
