= Scott Storch =

American record producer and songwriter (born 1973)

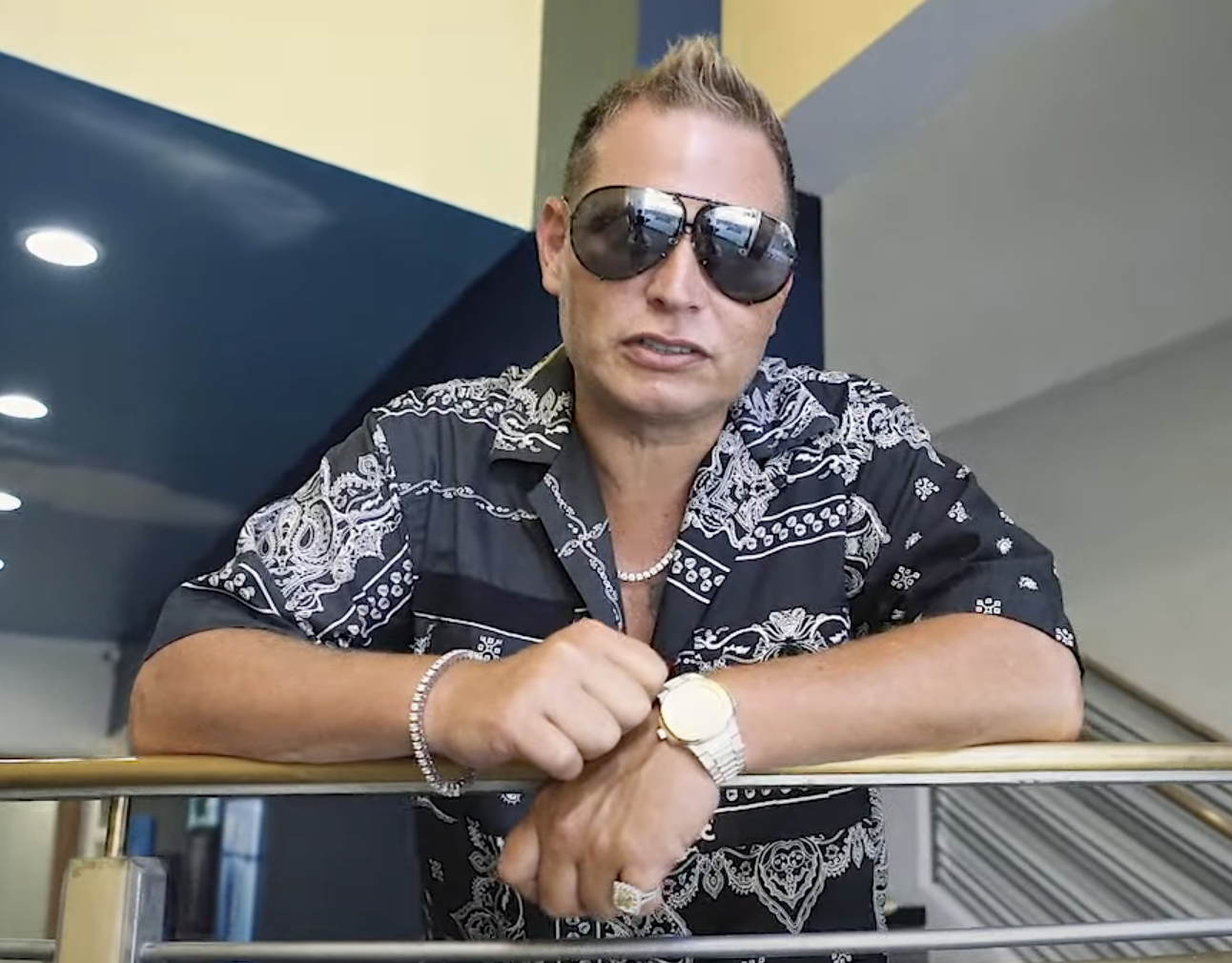
- Storch in 2021

Background information
- Born: Scott Spencer Storch; December 16, 1973 (age 52); Long Island, New York, U.S.
- Origin: Philadelphia, Pennsylvania, U.S.
- Genres: Hip-hop; R&B
- Occupations: Record producer; songwriter
- Instrument: Keyboards
- Works: Production discography
- Years active: 1991–present
- Labels: Storch; We the Best; Tuff Jew; Aftermath
- Formerly of: The Roots
- Children: 1

Scott Spencer Storch (born December 16, 1973) is an American record producer and songwriter. Storch began his career as part of Philadelphia-based hip-hop band the Roots, which he joined as a keyboardist prior to the release of their 1993 debut album, Organix. He provided the keyboard riff and co-composed Dr. Dre's 1999 single "Still D.R.E.," and contributed in a similar role to several of the rapper's productions during late 1990s and early 2000s. Storch expanded his solo production work into the 2000s; he was credited on five Billboard Hot 100-number one singles—Beyoncé's "Baby Boy," Terror Squad's "Lean Back," 50 Cent's "Candy Shop," Mario's "Let Me Love You" and Chris Brown's "Run It!"—among other similarly successful chart entries throughout the remaining decade. Storch has been nominated for four Grammy Awards.

== Early life ==
Storch was born on Long Island, New York. He was raised in South Florida and Philadelphia, Pennsylvania. His mother, Joyce Yolanda Storch, was a singer signed to Philadelphia's Cameo-Parkway Records under the stage name Joyce Carol, and is of Lithuanian Jewish heritage. His father, Phil Storch, was a court reporter. His uncle, Jeremy Storch, was a founder of soul-rock band the Vagrants and wrote songs recorded by Dave Mason and Eddie Money. Storch's parents divorced in 1983.

Storch attended elementary school in Sunrise and middle school in Davie, Florida. In the middle of his freshman year, he left South Florida to join his father in the Philadelphia area, and attended high school in Bensalem, Pennsylvania. After dropping out of high school in the ninth grade, Storch was expelled from home at age 16. By age 18, he was living with his father in Cherry Hill, New Jersey.

Some publications have written that Storch was born in Canada, but in 2010 the Miami New Times wrote a denial under the title "Scott Storch is not Canadian".

== Career ==
Scott Storch began his professional music career in 1991, when he became one of the first members of the hip-hop group the Roots as a keyboard player. He was heavily involved in the following two albums released by the Roots: Organix and Do You Want More?!!!??! and had involvement in Illadelph Halflife. Storch, however, didn't like touring. He preferred creating in the studio and decided to become a music producer instead.

Storch's first two commercial hits were from his production on the track "You Got Me" by the Roots ft. Erykah Badu and Eve and his collaboration with Dr. Dre for the song "Still D.R.E.". In the 2000s he worked on commercially successful singles by 50 Cent, the Game, T.I., Chris Brown, Justin Timberlake, Christina Aguilera, Beyoncé, Dr. Dre, Nas, Snoop Dogg, Pink, Lil' Kim and many others. CBC Radio mentioned that his musical contribution had "a broad influence on pop culture". Storch was awarded ASCAP's Songwriter of the Year award in 2006. According to Complex “between 2003 and 2005, Storch was arguably the biggest producer in hip-hop and R&B”.

However, because of Storch's cocaine addiction, the following years saw a decline in his producing career: “For me, it was the combination of cocaine and women. You feel everything so much when you’re on that drug, and you find yourself falling in love every night. You want to screw a girl, like, 20 times a night. And these girls want to go skiing all night long,” he explains. ‘Then suddenly it’s three o’clock in the afternoon, you have six things scheduled and you’re not going to show up to them because you’re a f—ing train wreck.”

He produces hip-hop music through his label, Storch Music Company. He also had his own music production company called Tuff Jew Productions LLC which is published by Reservoir Media Management.

Since filing for bankruptcy in 2015, Storch has worked with DJ Khaled, the Game, Berner, Russ, Bone Thugs-n-Harmony, Crim Dela Crim, amongst others.

== Personal life ==
By 2006, Storch was worth more than $70 million. His son was born April 16, 2006, with his part-time girlfriend of seven years Dalene "Daedreams" Daniel. Storch became addicted to cocaine. In August 2006, he "took a month off", with friend and manager Derek Jackson saying, "It was just a wonderful year, but I think it was defined by the magic month of August. He ran into the Hollywood class – and when he went to Hollywood, all things changed." He withdrew from producing and focused on partying with friends at his $10 million mansion in Palm Island, Florida. He also purchased a private jet, a 117-foot yacht, and nearly 20 luxury cars, about half of which he estimated he purchased while high on cocaine. Storch squandered $30 million in less than six months, and was in dire financial straits by January 2007.

In 2008, Storch hit legal trouble after allegedly falling behind on child-support payments and property taxes. In early 2009, he was arrested for motor vehicle theft for allegedly failing to return a Bentley leased three years prior. In April 2009, Storch checked into an intensive inpatient rehab program in Hollywood, Florida, before filing for bankruptcy that May. In February 2012, Storch was arrested in Las Vegas, Nevada, for possession of cocaine and was released on bail. On June 24, 2015, Storch officially filed for bankruptcy.

Storch revealed that in 2015 he quit using cocaine, mentioning his recreational usage of marijuana as a key factor in his recovery process. In 2020 he opened a drug rehab center that uses cannabis to help patients recover from addiction.
