= Steven Mandel =

American music producer and engineer

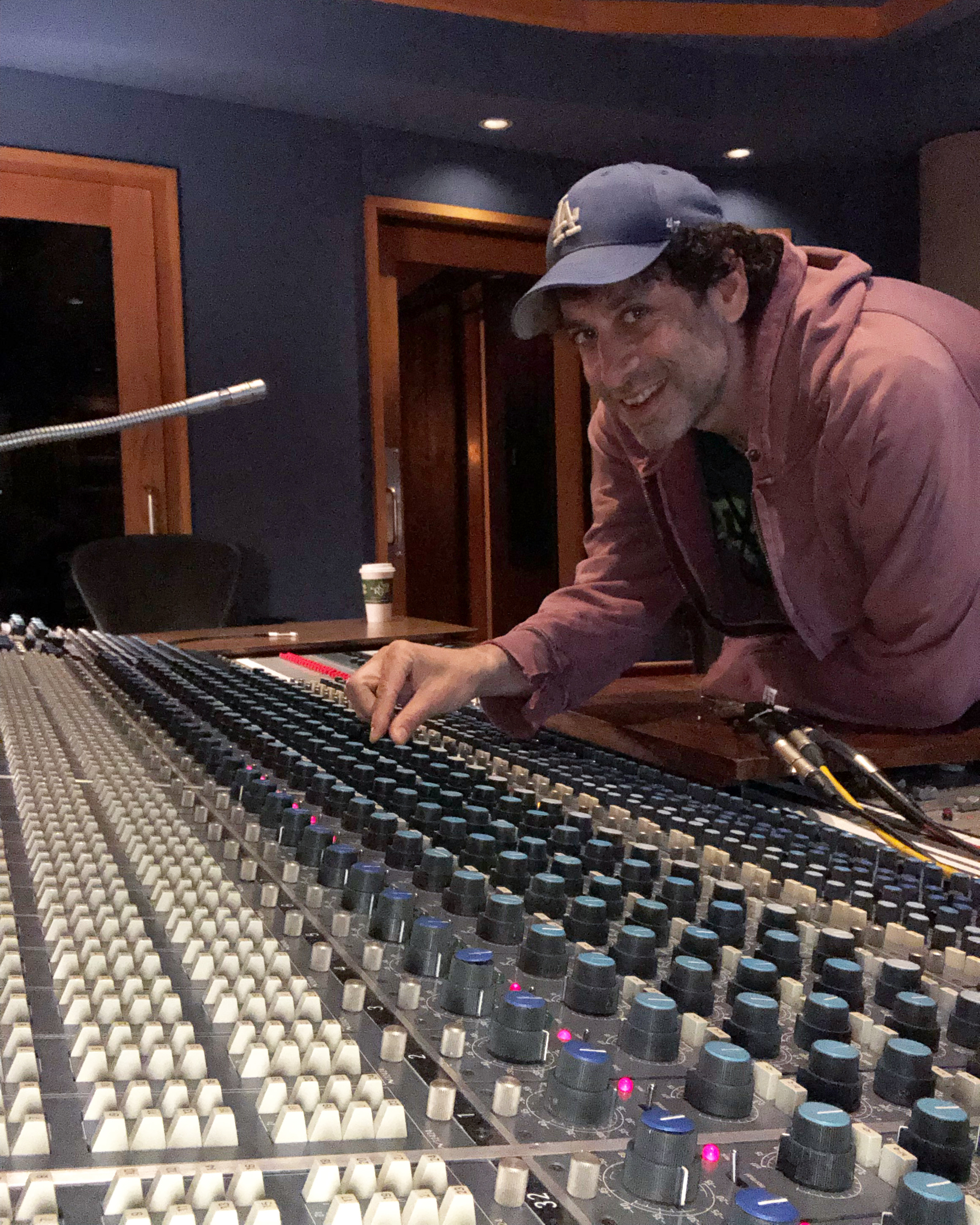
- Steven Mandel at Electric Lady Studios in 2021

Background information
- Born: 1969 (age 56–57)
- Genres: Jazz; Hip hop; Rock; New wave
- Occupations: Record producer; Audio engineer; Radio DJ; Podcaster
- Years active: 1996–present
- Labels: J.M.I. Recordings; CHUH Music

Steven Mandel (born 1969) is an American music producer, audio engineer, songwriter, record label executive, radio DJ, and podcaster. He is also music producer for The Roots on The Tonight Show with Jimmy Fallon. Mandel has produced music for The Roots, Elvis Costello, Todd Rundgren, Squeeze and Erykah Badu among others.

In 2016, Mandel co-founded the record label, J.M.I Recordings, which specializes in recording, mixing, and mastering in analog. He is co-host of "Labeled On WKCR" on Columbia University’s WKCR radio station, and was a member of "Team Supreme" on the Questlove Supreme podcast 2016-2025.

== Early life ==
Mandel grew up in the hamlets of Bardonia and Nanuet in Rockland County, New York. He graduated from the University of Maryland, College Park in 1991, with a Journalism major and English minor. He later graduated from the Institute of Audio Research in 1996.

== Work ==
In 1996, Mandel became an assistant engineer at Electric Lady Studios in New York City. Mentored by Russell Elevado, he recorded sessions with the Soulquarians and met Ahmir "Questlove" Thompson during D'Angelo's Voodoo album. Mandel would eventually become the first chief engineer of Electric Lady Studios since Eddie Kramer.

Other notable albums Mandel worked on during his time at Electric Lady (1996–2004) include Common’s Like Water for Chocolate and Electric Circus, Erykah Badu’s Mama's Gun, The Roots’ Things Fall Apart, The Roots Come Alive and Phrenology, Prince's Rave Un2 The Joy Fantastic, D’Angelo's Black Messiah and Roy Hargrove's Hard Groove, on which he received a songwriting credit for the song "Juicy".

In 2004, Mandel relocated to Philadelphia, Pennsylvania, where he became the in-house engineer for Questlove and worked at "The Studio" on multiple Roots projects including Rising Down, Game Theory, Home Grown, How I Got Over, Undun, and John Legend & The Roots’ Grammy Award-winning Wake Up!.

He accompanied The Roots as an engineer and producer to Late Night with Jimmy Fallon in 2009 and has continued in that position on The Tonight Show with Jimmy Fallon since 2014. He has also appeared in various sketches on The Tonight Show.

Mandel co-produced and engineered the album Wise Up Ghost with Questlove and Elvis Costello in 2013. He is credited as a co-songwriter on most tracks. Mandel engineered and produced Swindles, a series of 24 recordings dedicated to the music of Squeeze. Six songs have been released since 2018 via Yep Roc Records on Record Store Day. Mandel co-wrote "Godiva Girl" with Todd Rundgren, Questlove and Ray Angry in 2021.

Mandel was a co-host of the Questlove Supreme podcast for its run on Pandora and iHeart Radio 2016–2025, where he was dubbed "Suga Steve" by his co-hosts.

== Production discography ==
=== Singles ===
- "American Tune" (2006), The Imposter (Elvis Costello), Lupe-O-Tone
- "Someone Else’s Heart" (2018), Elvis Costello, Yep Roc
- "Take Me I’m Yours" (2018), Difford & Tilbrook with Questlove & Robert Glasper, Yep Roc
- Bob_James (2019), Antero Sievert featuring Daru Jones, JMI
- "Tempted" (2019), Erykah Badu with James Poyser, Yep Roc
- "Bang Bang" (2020), Todd Rundgren, Yep Roc
- "In Quintessence" (2020), Mike Watt and the Secondmen, Yep Roc
- "Black Coffee In Bed" (2021), Bilal featuring Nikki Jean, Yep Roc
- Happiness Is A Warm Gun (2022), Antero Sievert with Noah Halpern, JMI
- Night Bell (2023), Catriona Sturton, JMI
- When The Music's Over (2023), Doyle Bramhall II/DJ Harrison/Daru Jones, JMI

=== Albums ===
- Gold Sounds (2005) - James Carter/Cyrus Chestnut, BBR
- The Co-Op (2007) - Jeremy Pelt/Warren Wolf, BBR
- Wise Up Ghost (2013), Elvis Costello & The Roots, Blue Note Records
- Sit Back, Relax & Unwind (2017), Steve Wilson, JMI
- One (2018), Ray Angry, JMI
- The_Underscore (2019), Antero Sievert, JMI
- everybody’s waltz (2020) Helen Sung with Marquis Hill, JMI
- Onyx (2022), Sasha Berliner, JMI
- Dear Bossa: (2022), Antero Sievert, JMI
- Sun/Moon (2022), David Murray, JMI
- Ashes (2023), Lage Lund, JMI
- Blaque Dynamite (2023), Mike Mitchell, JMI
- Max Gerl (2023), Max Gerl, JMI
- PLUMB (2023), David Murray/Questlove/Ray Angry, JMI
- Life (2023), Warren Wolf, JMI
- Un (2023), James Carter, JMI
- Hard Pan (2023), Max Gerl & Mike Mitchell, JMI
- Max Gerl Trio (2025), Max Gerl, JMI

== Albums (as artist) ==
- Bardonia (2002), Bardonia, CHUH
- Monroe (2003), Monroe, CHUH
- Studeo Ratz - The Night Surrounding (2025) [Best of the Studeo Ratz], CHUH

== See also ==
- Questlove Supreme
- Wise Up Ghost
