= Kamal Gray =

American in The Roots

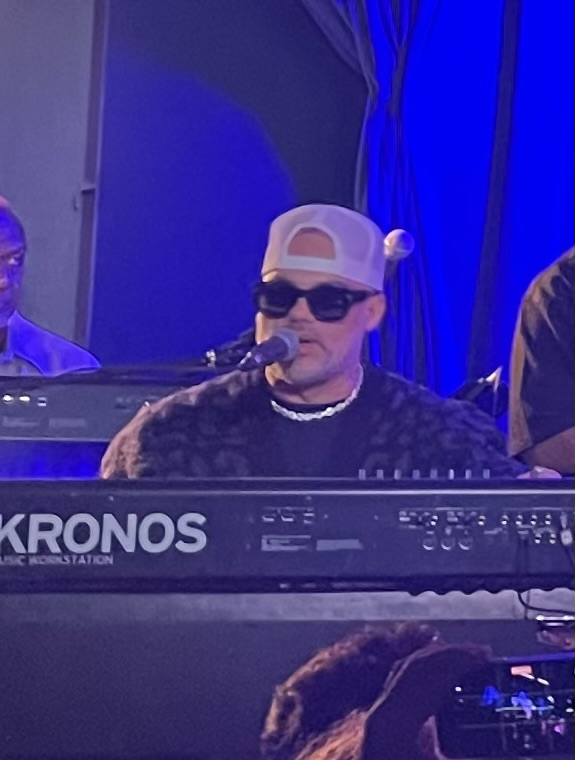
- Kamal Gray with The Roots at The Blue Note, NYC in 2025

Background information
- Birth name: James Gray
- Origin: Philadelphia, Pennsylvania, U.S.
- Genres: Hip hop; Rap; Rock; Neo soul; Funk; Jazz; Jazz fusion
- Occupation: Musician
- Instrument(s): Keyboard, Vocals
- Member of: The Roots, The Tonight Show Band

Kamal Gray is a hip-hop keyboardist, rapper, vocalist, and producer from Philadelphia, Pennsylvania. He is member of the hip hop band, The Roots, who are also the house band, The Tonight Show Band on The Tonight Show Starring Jimmy Fallon. Gray occasionally appears in games and sketches on The Tonight Show.

Growing up in Mount Airy, Philadelphia, Gray played basketball and football at Martin Luther King High. He studied the guitar before focusing on jazz piano training in his early teens.

Gray joined The Roots in 1994 immediately after graduating from high school in Philadelphia. He replaced keyboard player Scott Storch joining the band in London. His first album with The Roots was Illadelph Halflife in 1996, and he has played on twelve of their fourteen studio albums.

Music writers have discussed Gray's background in classical and jazz piano with influences including Herbie Hancock and Thelonious Monk. Critics have also discussed Gray's ability to integrate complex jazz styles into hip-hop keyboard rhythms, which has helped set the band apart from other hip-hop acts.

== Discography ==
=== With The Roots ===
- ...And Then You Shoot Your Cousin, Def Jam Recordings, 2014
- Wise Up Ghost, Blue Note, 2013
- Undun, Def Jam Recordings, 2011
- How I Got Over, 2010
- Rising Down, Def Jam Recordings, 2008
- Game Theory, Def Jam Recordings, 2006
- The Tipping Point, Geffen, 2004
- Phrenology, MCA, 2002
- Things Fall Apart, MCA, 1999
- What They Do, Geffen Records, 1996
- Illadelph Halflife, DGC, Geffen Records, 1996

=== Soundtrack credits ===
- The 'Notic – Men In Black (The Album), Columbia/Sony Music Soundtrax, 1997
