= Tuba Gooding Jr. =

American tubist in The Roots

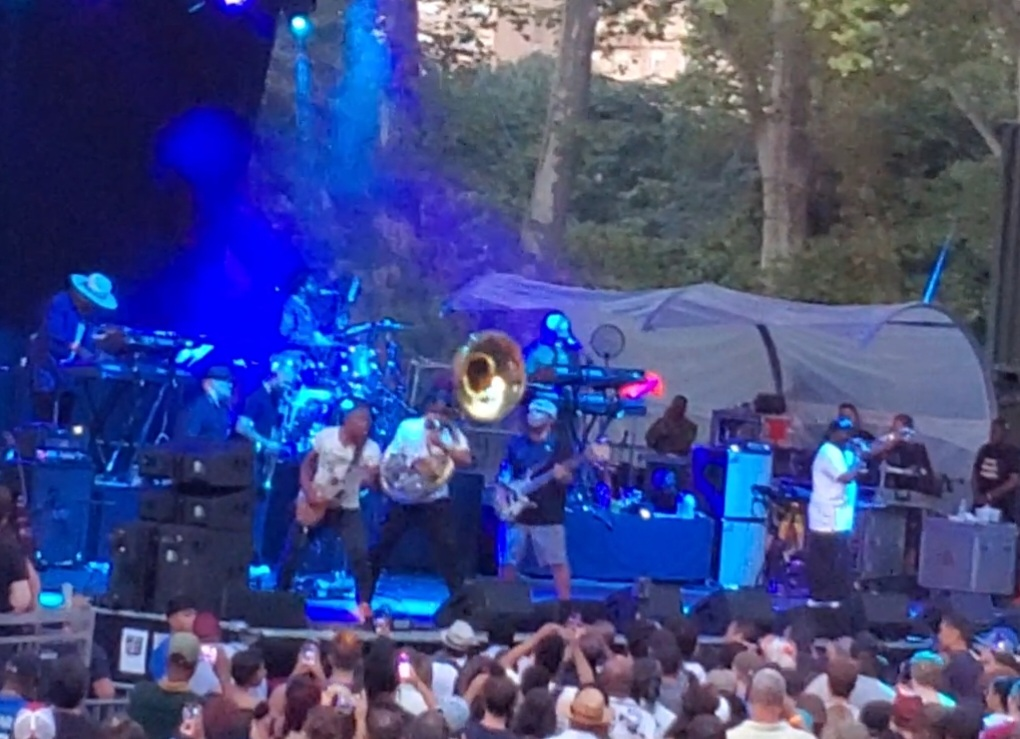
- Tuba Gooding Jr. with The Roots at Central Park Summerstage, August 24, 2024

Background information
- Birth name: Damon Eugene Bryson
- Genres: Rock; Neo soul; Funk; Jazz; Jazz fusion
- Occupation: Musician
- Instrument(s): Sousaphone, Tuba
- Member of: The Roots, The Tonight Show Band

Damon Eugene Bryson (born 1978), better known by his stage name Tuba Gooding Jr., is an American tubist and member of the hip hop band The Roots, joining the band in 2007. He plays the sousaphone in The Roots in the house band for The Tonight Show Starring Jimmy Fallon.

The sousaphone is a low brass instrument mainly used as a marching band tuba. Bryson was named "one of the top sousaphone players of all time" by Brass 'n Wind.

In a 2014 interview, Bryson told reporter Mister Mann Frisby that he named his 37 pound sousaphone "Onyx" because of the color.

== Early life ==
Bryson is from South Philadelphia. He attended Universal Audenried Charter High School. Bryson started playing in the band Brass Heaven in his 20s, playing at venues including Warmdaddy's and Chris' Jazz Cafe, in Philadelphia before he was discovered by Questlove and recruited to The Roots in 2007.

== Discography ==
=== With The Roots ===
- Rising Down, (2008), Def Jam Recordings
- Undun (2011), Def Jam Recordings
- Wise Up Ghost (2013), Blue Note
- ...And Then You Shoot Your Cousin (2014), Def Jam Recordings
