= Illadelph Halflife =

Studio album by the Roots
- Released: September 24, 1996
- Recorded: 1996
- Genre: Hip-hop; underground hip-hop; jazz rap
- Length: 78:45
- Label: DGC; Geffen
- Producer: Black Thought; Chaos; Kelo; L.A. Jay; Q-Tip (The Ummah); Questlove; Rahzel; Raphael Saadiq; Scott Storch; Scratch; Slimkid3; The Grand Negaz

The Roots chronology
Do You Want More?!!!??! (1995)	Illadelph Halflife (1996)	Things Fall Apart (1999)

Singles from Illadelph Halflife
- 1. "Clones" Released: July 16, 1996; 2. "Concerto of the Desperado" Released: 1996; 3. "What They Do" Released: November 19, 1996

Illadelph Halflife is the third studio album by American hip-hop band the Roots, released September 24, 1996, on DGC and Geffen Records. It features a tougher and broader sound than their previous album, Do You Want More?!!!??! (1995). The album also contains integration of programmed drums and guest contributions by R&B musicians such as Amel Larrieux and D'Angelo, as well as jazz musicians such as David Murray, Steve Coleman, Cassandra Wilson, Graham Haynes. In 1998, the album was selected as one of The Source's 100 Best Rap Albums. In 2006, the album was selected as one of Hip Hop Connection's 100 Best Rap Albums from 1995 to 2005. The multi-track tapes recorded to mix the album were destroyed in a fire at the Universal Studios back lot in 2008, however, the original 1996 master tape remains unaffected.

== Reception ==
Professional ratings
Review scores
Source	Rating
AllMusic	5/5 stars
Alternative Press	3/5
Chicago Tribune	3/4 stars
Entertainment Weekly	A−
Los Angeles Times	3.5/4 stars
NME	4/10
Rolling Stone	3.5/5 stars
The Rolling Stone Album Guide	4/5 stars
The Source	4.5/5 stars
Spin	9/10

The New York Times writer Neil Strauss called the album "one of the year's best rap offerings" and wrote that "The Roots move indiscriminately from politically conscious lyrics (not just about black America but also about Bosnia, the Olympics and terrorism) to silly rhymes ('roam like a cellular phone/far from home')". The Philadelphia Inquirer wrote that "while it doesn't sacrifice a smidgen of street-level intensity, it reaffirms just how far-reaching (and how far removed from the gangsta stereotype) hip-hop can be". Tracii McGregor of The Source magazine called it "a thoughtful musical endeavor ... an emotional and spiritually fulfilling aural experience". Spin critic Selwyn Seyfu Hinds described it as "an artistic progression, and added confirmation of the Roots' place at hip-hop's vanguard". The San Diego Union-Tribune's Jeff Niesel stated "the Roots find the perfect mixture of jazz and hip-hop for their songs about the hardships of urban life".

The Village Voice's Robert Christgau gave the album a (neither) rating, which indicates a record that "may impress once or twice with consistent craft or an arresting track or two. Then it won't." However, Illadelph Halflife was ranked number 33 on The Village Voice's Pazz & Jop critics' poll of 1996. A 2004 retrospective review by Rolling Stone perceived it as an improvement over the Roots's previous work, stating "The messages grew more focused on 1996's Illadelph Halflife, which includes several strident anti-gangsta tirades and taunts. Black Thought replaced the bellicose, confrontational bravado of so many rappers with discussions of fidelity and responsibility".

== Track listing ==
Continuation from Do You Want More???

No.	Title	Writer(s)	Producer(s)	Length
34.	"Intro"			0:34
35.	"Respond/React"	Ahmir Thompson; Kenyatta Williams; Malik Abdul-Basit; Tariq Trotter	Kelo; Black Thought (co.); Questlove (add.)	5:07
36.	"Section"	Thompson; Kamal Gray; Abdul-Basit; Trotter	The Grand Negaz; Kelo (co.)	4:08
37.	"Panic!!!!!"	Thompson; Rahzel Brown; Trotter	Questlove; The Grand Negaz (co.); Rahzel (co.)	1:24
38.	"It Just Don't Stop"	Gray; Williams; Leonard Hubbard; Abdul-Basit; Trotter	Kelo	4:33
39.	"Episodes" (featuring Dice Raw)	Thompson; Gray; Karl Jenkins; Melvin Lewis; Abdul-Basit; Trotter; Tracey Moore	Chaos; Questlove (co.)	5:56
40.	"Push Up Ya Lighter" (featuring Bahamadia)	Thompson; Antonia Reed; Gray; Abdul-Basit; Trotter	The Grand Negaz; Kelo (co.)	4:36
41.	"What They Do" (featuring Raphael Saadiq)	Thompson; Gray; Hubbard; Saadiq; Brown; Trotter	Questlove; The Grand Negaz (co.); Raphael Saadiq (co.)	5:57
42.	"? vs. Scratch"	Thompson; Kyle Jones	Questlove; Scratch	1:47
43.	"Concerto of the Desperado"	Williams; Trotter	Kelo	3:38
44.	"Clones" (featuring Dice Raw & M.A.R.S.)	Jenkins; Williams; Phillip Blenman; Abdul-Basit; Trotter	Kelo	4:54
45.	"UNIverse at War" (featuring Common)	Hubbard; Lonnie Lynn; Lewis; Trotter	Chaos	4:55
46.	"No Alibi"	Thompson; Gray; Hubbard; Abdul-Basit; Trotter	The Grand Negaz; Chaos (co.)	5:11
47.	"Dave vs. US"	Thompson; David Murray; Brown	The Grand Negaz	0:50
48.	"No Great Pretender"	Thompson; Brown; Abdul-Basit	The Grand Negaz	4:25
49.	"The Hypnotic" (featuring D'Angelo)	Thompson; Trotter; Trevant Hardson	Questlove; L.A. Jay (co.); Slimkid3 (co.)	5:19
50.	"Ital (The Universal Side)" (featuring Q-Tip)	Thompson; Kamaal Fareed; Gray; Trotter	The Grand Negaz; Q-Tip (The Ummah) (co.)	4:53
51.	"One Shine" (featuring Joshua Redman & Cassandra Wilson)	Thompson; Hubbard; Scott Storch; Trotter	The Grand Negaz	5:40
52.	"The Adventures in Wonderland" (featuring Ursula Rucker)	Thompson; Rucker	The Grand Negaz; Questlove (co.)	4:34
53.	"Outro"			0:15

- The track listing on some album releases denotes the first track as track #34, combining the track totals from Organix (17 tracks) and Do You Want More?!!!??! (16 tracks), making 33 total tracks. The rest of the tracks continue upward from 34 to the Outro (being track #53)

== Usage of songs ==
The intro of the song named "Section" is sampled by Jeremy Harding for his "Playground riddim", which was later used as the instrumental for Beenie Man's 1997 single "Who Am I (Sim Simma)".

== Charts ==
Chart (1996)	Peak position
Swedish Albums (Sverigetopplistan)	56
US Billboard 200	21
US Top R&B/Hip-Hop Albums (Billboard)	4

== Credits ==
- Producer(s): The Grand Negaz, Questlove, Black Thought, Kelo, Q-Tip (The Ummah), Raphael Saadiq, Scratch, Chaos, L.A. Jay, Slimkid3, Scott Storch
- Executive Producer: Richard Nichols
- Mixing Engineer(s): Bob Power, Duro, Questlove, Black Thought, Richard Nichols, Kelo, Tim Donovan, Mel Lewis
- Photography: Michael Lavine
- Layout Design: Julius Niskey

== Notes ==
- Nathan Brackett, Christian Hoard (2004). The New Rolling Stone Album Guide. Completely Revised and Updated 4th Edition. Simon and Schuster. ISBN 0-7432-0169-8.
