= Betty Wright: The Movie =

Studio album by Betty Wright & the Roots
- Released: November 15, 2011
- Genre: R&B; soul
- Length: 77:41
- Label: S-Curve
- Producer: Ahmir "Questlove" Thompson; Betty Wright; Angelo Morris

Betty Wright chronology
Fit for a Queen (2001)	Betty Wright: The Movie (2011)

The Roots chronology
Wake Up! (2010)	Betty Wright: The Movie (2011)	Undun (2011)

Professional ratings
Aggregate scores
Source	Rating
Metacritic	75/100
Review scores
Source	Rating
AllMusic	3.5/5 stars
Entertainment Weekly	A−
MSN Music (Expert Witness)	(2-star Honorable Mention)

Betty Wright: The Movie is a musical album, a collaboration by singer Betty Wright and the Roots. It was released on November 15, 2011.

== Background ==
Although this was the first album Wright released in almost ten years, she spent time writing, singing back up, arranging, and producing songs for several artists including Keyshia Cole, Diddy, Joss Stone, Kelly Clarkson, and Lil Wayne. She teamed up with the Roots for several studio sessions to bring forth this project. All songs were either written or co-written by Wright herself.

== Singles ==
The lead single for the album is the upbeat performance of "Grapes on a Vine" featuring Lil Wayne.

== Release ==
The album was released on November 15, 2011 by S-Curve Records. It has received generally positive reviews by critics with a Metacritic giving it a score of 73 out of 100. It was listed as #6 on Associated Press's best albums of 2011.

== Track listing ==
No.	Title	Writer(s)	Producer(s)	Length
1.	"Old Songs"	Betty Wright • Angelo Morris • Raymond Cordon	Ahmir "?uestlove" Thompson • Betty Wright	5:39
2.	"Real Woman" (featuring Snoop Dogg)	Wright • Sean McMillon • Ralph Jeanty • Morris • Calvin Broadus	Thompson • Wright	5:35
3.	"In the Middle of the Game (Don't Change the Play)"	Wright • Morris • Tony Castillo	Thompson • Wright	3:56
4.	"Surrender"	Wright • Morris	Thompson • Wright	5:07
5.	"Grapes on a Vine" (featuring Lil Wayne)	Wright • Morris • Dwayne Carter	Thompson • Wright • Angelo Morris	5:16
6.	"Look Around (Be a Man)"	Wright • Morris • Adam Pallin	Thompson • Wright	5:07
7.	"Tonight Again"	Wright • Morris	Thompson • Wright	5:24
8.	"Hollywould" (featuring Robert "The Messenger" Bozeman)	Wright • Morris • Robert Bozeman	Thompson • Wright	6:40
9.	"Whisper in the Wind" (featuring Joss Stone)	Wright • Morris • Jocelyn Stoker	Thompson • Wright	5:26
10.	"Baby Come Back" (featuring Lenny Williams)	Wright • McMillon • Jeanty	Thompson • Wright	4:38
11.	"So Long, So Wrong"	Wright • Morris	Thompson • Wright	3:38
12.	"You and Me, Leroy"	Wright • Ahmir Thompson • Raymond Angry • Mark Kelley	Thompson • Wright	5:36
13.	"The One (Bonus Track)"	Wright • Greg Curtis	Wright • Morris	6:05
14.	"Go! (Live) [Bonus Track]"	Wright • Morris • James "J-Dub" Wright	Wright • Morris	9:40
