= The Tipping Point (The Roots album) =

Studio album by the Roots
- Released: July 13, 2004
- Recorded: September 2003 – April 2004
- Genres: Hip-hop; neo soul
- Length: 54:41
- Labels: Okayplayer; Geffen
- Producers: Anthony Tidd; Frank "Knuckles" Walker; Melvin "Chaos" Lewis; Questlove; Robert "LB" Dorsey; Richard Nichols (also exec.); Scott Storch; Tahir Jamal; the Grand Wizzards; Zoukan

The Roots chronology
Phrenology (2002)	The Tipping Point (2004)	Game Theory (2006)

The Tipping Point is the sixth studio album by American hip-hop band the Roots, released July 13, 2004 on Questlove's Okayplayer Records and Geffen Records. It is named after Canadian journalist Malcolm Gladwell's book of the same name (2000), and is the follow-up to Phrenology (2002). The album is a musical departure from their previous work, featuring a more diverse, yet pop-oriented sound, and it contains lyrics associated with rapping-prowess, political insight, and social commentary. The Tipping Point has been noted by music writers for exhibiting and emphasizing soul, jazz, and funk influences as well. The song "I Don't Care" was featured on the soundtrack of the game Gran Turismo 4.

The cover image is a stylised rendering of a 1944 Boston police mug shot of Malcolm X, following his arrest for larceny.

== Reception ==
Professional ratings
Aggregate scores
Source	Rating
Metacritic	72/100
Review scores
Source	Rating
AllMusic	3.5/5 stars
Blender	3/5 stars
Entertainment Weekly	B+
The Independent	4/5 stars
Los Angeles Times	2/4 stars
NME	8/10
Pitchfork	5.4/10
Rolling Stone	3/5 stars
The Rolling Stone Album Guide	4/5 stars
Spin	B
The Village Voice	A−

The album debuted at number four on the U.S. Billboard 200 chart, selling 109,000 copies in its first week selling 428,000 in the US, as of 2008. Despite mixed criticism towards its production and lyrical substance, The Tipping Point received generally positive reviews from most music critics, based on an aggregate score of 72 out of 100 on Metacritic.

== Track listing ==
No.	Title	Writer(s)	Producer(s)	Length
103.	"Star/Pointro" (featuring Wadud Ahmad)	Ahmir 'Questlove' Thompson; James Kamal Gray; Leonard 'Hub' Hubbard; Sylvester Stewart; Tariq 'Black Thought' Trotter	Questlove	7:36
104.	"I Don't Care" (featuring Dom)	Kirk Douglas; Gray; Hubbard; Karl Jenkins; Thompson; Anthony Tidd; Trotter; Frank 'Knuckles' Walker	Questlove; Tidd; Walker; Richard Nichols	4:02
105.	"Don't Say Nuthin'"	Trotter; Scott Storch	Scott Storch	3:35
106.	"Guns Are Drawn" (featuring Aaron Livingston)	Douglas; Gray; Hubbard; Livingston; Thompson; Tidd; Trotter; Walker	Questlove; Tidd; Walker; Nichols	5:15
107.	"Stay Cool" (featuring Martin Luther)	Jenkins; Melvin 'Chaos' Lewis; Griffin; Trotter; Paterno	Chaos	3:34
108.	"Web"	Hubbard; Trotter; Thompson	Robert 'LB' Dorsey	3:16
109.	"Boom!" (featuring Dice Raw)	Antonio Hardy; Jenkins; Lewis; Thompson; Trotter; Marlon Williams; Nathaniel Wilson	Chaos	2:57
110.	"Somebody's Gotta Do It" (featuring Devin The Dude, Jean Grae & Mack Dub)	Floyd Carson; Douglas; Gray; Tsidi Ibrahim; Hubbard; Jenkins; Trotter; Thompson	Tahir Jamal	4:08
111.	"Duck Down!" (featuring Dom)	Trotter; Scott Storch	Scott Storch	3:56
112.	"Why (What's Goin' On?)" (featuring Latif) / "In Love With the Mic" (featuring Dave Chappelle, Ol' Dirty Bastard, Skillz & Truck North) (hidden track) / "Din Da Da" (hidden track)	Bey (i); Douglas (i); Gray (i); Hubbard (i); George Kranz (iii); Donnie Shaquan Lewis (ii); Jamal Miller (ii); Thompson (i); Trotter (iv); Williams (i)	Zukhan (i); Questlove (ii); The Grand Wizzards (iii)	16:22

Japan / UK bonus track / US vinyl release
No.	Title	Length
113.	"Melting Pot" (cover of song of the same name by Booker T. & the M.G.'s)	10:40

Sample credits

- "Star" samples "Everybody Is a Star" by Sly & The Family Stone
- "Stay Cool" samples "Harlem Hendoo" by Al Hirt
- "Web" samples "Dance Girl" by The Rimshots

Extra Notes

- i = "Why (What's Goin' On?)" only
- ii = "In Love With The Mic" only
- iii = "Din Da Da" only
- iv = "Why (What's Goin' On?)" and "In Love With The Mic" only

== Personnel ==
The Roots

- Vocals: Tariq 'Black Thought' Trotter
- Bass: Adam Blackstone & Leonard 'Hub' Hubbard
- Drums: Ahmir 'Questlove' Thompson
- Guitars: Anthony Tidd, Captain Kirk Douglas & Martin Luther
- Horns: Kevin Hanson
- Sound Manipulation: Si McMenamin
- Keyboards: Kamal Gray & Omar Edwards
- Percussion: Frank 'Knuckles' Walker

Production

- Producers: Questlove, Scott Storch, Melvin 'Chaos' Walker, Anthony Tidd, Frank 'Knuckles' Walker, Richard Nichols, Robert 'LB' Dorsey, Tahir, Zukhan
- Executive Producer: Richard Nichols

== Charts ==
=== Weekly charts ===
Chart (2004)	Peak position
Austrian Albums (Ö3 Austria)	57
Belgian Albums (Ultratop Flanders)	51
Canadian Albums (Nielsen SoundScan)	11
Canadian R&B Albums (Nielsen SoundScan)	5
Dutch Albums (Album Top 100)	44
French Albums (SNEP)	35
Finnish Albums (Suomen virallinen lista)	22
German Albums (Offizielle Top 100)	44
Italian Albums (FIMI)	30
Norwegian Albums (VG-lista)	20
Scottish Albums (Official Charts)	99
Swedish Albums (Sverigetopplistan)	37
Swiss Albums (Schweizer Hitparade)	3
UK Albums (Official Charts)	71
UK R&B Albums (Official Charts)	13
US Billboard 200	4
US Top R&B/Hip-Hop Albums (Billboard)	2

=== Year-end charts ===
Chart (2004)	Position
Swiss Albums (Schweizer Hitparade)	95
US Top R&B/Hip-Hop Albums (Billboard)	86

== Notes ==
- Nathan Brackett, Christian Hoard (2004). The New Rolling Stone Album Guide: Completely Revised and Updated 4th Edition. Simon and Schuster. ISBN 0-7432-0169-8.
