= Undun =

Studio album by the Roots
- Released: December 6, 2011
- Studio: A House Called Quest, daCrib, and The Boom Room in Philadelphia; Downtown Music Studios and MSR Studios in New York
- Genre: Alternative hip-hop
- Length: 38:08
- Label: Def Jam
- Producer: Ahmir "Questlove" Thompson; Ray Angry; Brent "Ritz" Reynolds; D.D. Jackson; Hot Sugar; James Poyser; Khari Mateen; Richard Nichols (also exec.); Rick Friedrich; Sean C & LV; Sufjan Stevens

The Roots chronology
| Betty Wright: The Movie (2011) | Undun (2011) | Wise Up Ghost (2013) |

Singles from Undun
- 1. "Make My" Released: November 1, 2011

Undun (stylized as undun) is the tenth and twelfth overall studio album by American hip-hop band the Roots. It was released on December 6, 2011, by Def Jam Recordings.

The album was recorded in sessions at several studios in Philadelphia and New York City. Production was handled primarily by Questlove, the band's record producer and drummer. They were joined by guest contributors, including vocalist Bilal and rappers Big K.R.I.T., Dice Raw, and Phonte.

Musically, Undun incorporates influences from neo soul and indie music. Thematically, it is an existential concept album about the short, tragic life of fictional character Redford Stevens, set in urban poverty and told through a reverse-chronological narrative.

The album performed modestly on music charts and sold 112,000 copies in the United States. It was a greater success with critics, being widely praised for its existential subject matter, production quality, and the band's musicianship. Undun was included on several critics' year-end lists of best albums.

== Writing and recording ==
At the time of recording, the Roots comprised lead rapper Black Thought, drummer and producer Ahmir "Questlove" Thompson, keyboardists Kamal Gray and James Poyser, percussionist F. Knuckles, guitarist Captain Kirk Douglas, sousaphonist Damon Bryson (Tuba Gooding Jr.), and bassist Mark Kelley. The band also worked with other rappers for the album, including Big K.R.I.T., Dice Raw, Phonte, and Truck North, as well as vocalists such as Aaron Livingston and Bilal.

Questlove said that the band benefited from the security and practice time provided by their job as the house band on Late Night with Jimmy Fallon. Working for NBC, the band is expected to write "short, concise songs, even if they don't get used on air. We have to create three to seven songs every day." Many of these short pieces were used for Undun. Questlove said the new practice space refocused the band's songwriting style, which was previously dependent on jamming during soundchecks on tour. Questlove said the financial stability of the new job also allowed the Roots to be more musically adventurous: "we could finally follow all those crazy ideas that we've had without fear of being dropped by our label... Now we have a safety net. Our Def Jam life is now an evening job. We now have the comfort and confidence to start making the albums we want to make. That's why undun feels like our second album. There's no pressure."

The album was recorded and mixed primarily at Downtown Music Studios in New York City and the Philadelphia recording locations A House Called Quest, daCrib, and The Boom Room. The track "Will to Power (3rd Movement)" was recorded and mixed at MSR Studios in New York City. Undun was mastered at The Mastering Palace in New York City.

== Music and lyrics ==
Undun is an existential concept album about the fictional character Redford Stevens, who is named after a Sufjan Stevens song. Its reverse-chronological narrative discusses his short, tragic life set in urban poverty. Expanding on the indie influence of the band's How I Got Over (2010), the album's music is characterized by snare-driven beats, neo soul elements, keyboard soundscapes, strings, choral arrangements, and tight dynamics.

=== Plot outline ===
"Illegal activity controls my black symphony
Orchestrated like it happened incidentally
Oh, there I go, from a man to a memory
Damn, I wonder if my fam will remember me"

— Black Thought on "Sleep"

The plot of the album takes place in reverse over the course of a day in Redford's life, with the multiple featured rappers all speaking from Redford's first-person perspective. The album opens with the sound of a flatlined EKG on the instrumental track "Dun", signifying Redford's death. This leads into the second track, "Sleep", where Black Thought's verse portrays Redford's dying thoughts on his life, fate and whether he will be remembered. "Make My" depicts the killing of Redford, with an extended outro modeled on Mobb Deep's "Shook Ones (Part II)" that conveys Redford's spirit beginning to leave his body.

"One Time" finds Redford feeling remorse and contemplating the course of his life; he reflects on the time that he stopped caring about school. "Kool On" and "The OtherSide" depict Redford living successfully as a drug dealer. "Kool On" hints that Redford is deluding himself, and the song's lyrics are about "how successful street hustlers might fool themselves in believing they are living the 'good life' but, in reality, 'living on borrowed time.'" "Stomp" is meant to be the song on which "he's either gonna live or he’s gonna die with whatever path he has chosen to go down." While Redford feels that he has been forced into crime, he is also decisively choosing his path. On "Lighthouse", Redford contemplates suicide, and the song's hook "there’s no one in the lighthouse/Face down in the ocean" is a metaphor for Redford being caught up in crime and questioning the direction of his life. Redford recalls his life before crime on "I Remember". "Tip the Scale" explores "how the odds are already stacked against a black man growing up in the ghetto even before he is born".

The album is concluded with a four-part instrumental movement. Part one is Sufjan Stevens performing his "Redford (For Yia-Yia & Pappou)", originally from the album Michigan; part two has a string quartet reinterpret the song. Part three is a free jazz performance by Questlove and pianist D. D. Jackson. The album concludes with the fourth part, another string quartet piece that ends abruptly with an unresolved piano chord. Roots manager Richard Nichols described the final four tracks as a "birth-cycle" and said "It’s almost like he was undone upon birth ... your outcome of your life is definitely gonna be affected by your surroundings, statistically."

=== Redford Stevens ===
The concept of following the story of a central character, Redford Stevens, on the album was the idea of band manager Richard Nichols. According to Questlove, the album's protagonist Redford is "the prototypical urban kid — young, gifted, black, and unraveling before our eyes," and is based on "a combination of maybe four to five people that we know in Philadelphia." Regarding the character, Black Thought said, "Redford's story isn't uncommon in Philadelphia ... I remember not being able to imagine being alive as a 30-year-old. I didn't know many people who had lived to 30." Inspiration for Redford was also culled from the Sufjan Stevens song "Redford (For Yia-Yia & Pappou)" from his album Michigan and the character Avon Barksdale from TV series The Wire. Some sources have interpreted Redford as an African-American everyman, though others have cautioned against this view, emphasizing his individual characteristics. For instance, Hilary Brown of Down Beat called Redford "a romantic, not a thug; a philosopher, not an everyman," and Rachel Kaadzi Ghansah wrote "The mistake is to read Redford as being like anyone who has their back to the wall, or to see the album’s narrative as a universal story."

By focusing the narrative on an ordinary middleman in the drug trade, Questlove said the band attempted to subvert rap music genre conventions, which often glamorize a life of crime with a powerful "Don Corleone" figure. Pitchfork's Nate Patrin said the album "isn't a sprawling, rise-and-fall crime story, not a condemnation or a veneration of a man living outside the law, not a bullet-riddled grand guignol heavy on explicit details of soldiers getting cut down. It's a character study of a man whose existential crisis ends only with his death—a death gone largely unspecified, the glamor and tragedy washed over with a doomed resignation." Asad Khawaja wrote that the willingness to stray from genre norms enhanced the album's dramatic realism: "Rather than fall prey to the hip-hop illusions of high life grandeur, the Roots weaves a tale of spiralling downward, made all the more poignant by a character wholly self-aware of his Faustian bargain."

== Cover ==
The cover art is a black-and-white rendering of the photo "Flying High" by documentary photographer Jamel Shabazz, which depicts a child flipping on a mattress outdoors. The cover art has been compared to the 1978 Charles Burnett film Killer of Sheep.

== Release and sales ==
Undun was released by Def Jam Recordings, first on December 2, 2011, in continental Europe, then on December 5 in the United Kingdom, and on December 6 in the United States. The album's lead single, "Make My" featuring Big K.R.I.T., was first released on November 1 to iTunes. When undun was released in the US, it debuted at number 17 on the Billboard 200 and sold 48,200 copies in its first week. By January 2012, it had sold 112,000 copies there.

== Critical reception ==
Professional ratings
Aggregate scores
| Source | Rating |
|---|---|
| AnyDecentMusic? | 7.9/10 |
| Metacritic | 88/100 |
Review scores
| Source | Rating |
| AllMusic | 4.5/5 stars |
| The A.V. Club | A |
| Chicago Tribune | 4/4 stars |
| The Daily Telegraph | 4/5 stars |
| Entertainment Weekly | A− |
| The Independent | 5/5 stars |
| MSN Music (Expert Witness) | B+ |
| Pitchfork | 7.3/10 |
| Rolling Stone | 3.5/5 stars |
| Spin | 7/10 |

Undun was met with widespread critical acclaim. At Metacritic, which assigns a normalized rating out of 100 to reviews from mainstream critics, the album received an average score of 88, based on 32 reviews.

Reviewing the album for AllMusic, Andy Kellman praised its "existential rhymes" and found its ideas "grave and penetrating". James Lachno from The Daily Telegraph was highly impressed by its music and how The Roots avoid "over-moralising or glorification". Los Angeles Times writer Ernest Hardy said the record offers "a psychological depth and complexity rarely afforded black folks in modern pop culture, including (or especially) the borough of contemporary hip-hop." Jon Pareles, writing in The New York Times, said it is "complete in itself ... made brief to be listened to as a whole." Andy Gill of The Independent said the record is possibly the group's best, offering "opportunities for more considered reflection on the values we choose in life" instead of "the sense of inevitability and the tragic bravado found in comparable hip-hop tragedies". In the Chicago Tribune, Greg Kot cited Undun as The Roots' best work and called it "both chilling and beautiful at once". At the end of 2011, Kot named it the year's second best album, while Ann Powers from NPR Music ranked it tenth on her year-end list.

Some reviewers expressed reservations. In Rolling Stone, Jody Rosen said Black Thought's "skilled but stolid rapping adds nothing new to the idiom" of the "morally ambiguous gangster tale", even though undun succeeds musically. Patrin found the storyline's "inevitable familiarity" to be "almost an end in itself" and that it "feels almost relentless in its singleminded dejection". Ian Cohen of Spin said Black Thought's reading of Redford Stephens sounded "business-like" and "consummately bland". Robert Christgau was also critical of the concept in his review for MSN Music, feeling that the song cycle lacks a feel for its fictional character, although he added that the album showcases a sound from The Roots "that shows no sign of standing pat". Of Black Thought's performance, he said the rapper offered "flashes of insight and articulated feeling" rather than wisdom.

== Track listing ==
Track numbers continued from How I Got Over.

| No. | Title | Writer(s) | Producer(s) | Length |
|---|---|---|---|---|
| 157. | "Dun" | Ray Angry; Ahmir Thompson | Questlove; Ray Angry | 1:16 |
| 158. | "Sleep" | Nicolas Koenig-Dzialowski; Thompson; Tariq Trotter; Aaron Livingston | Questlove; Hot Sugar | 2:15 |
| 159. | "Make My" (featuring Big K.R.I.T. & Dice Raw) | Khari Mateen; Trotter; Thompson; Angry; Justin Scott; Karl Jenkins | Questlove; Khari Mateen; Ray Angry | 4:27 |
| 160. | "One Time" (featuring Phonte & Dice Raw) | Brent Reynolds; Jenkins; Trotter; Thompson; Phonte Coleman | Questlove; Brent "Ritz" Reynolds | 3:55 |
| 161. | "Kool On" (featuring Greg Porn & Truck North) | Gregory Spearman; Jamal Miller; Trotter; Dewayne Julius Rogers Sr. | Questlove | 3:48 |
| 162. | "The OtherSide" (featuring Bilal & Greg Porn) | Thompson; Betty Wright; Jenkins; Trotter; Spearman; James Poyser; Angelo Morris; Sean McMillion; Ralph Jeanty | Questlove; James Poyser; Richard Nichols | 4:03 |
| 163. | "Stomp" (featuring Greg Porn) | Trotter; Spearman; Deleno Matthews; Levar Coppin | Sean C & LV | 2:23 |
| 164. | "Lighthouse" (featuring Dice Raw) | Richard Friedrich; Thompson; Jenkins; Trotter | Questlove; Rick Friedrich | 3:43 |
| 165. | "I Remember" | Mateen; Trotter; Thompson | Questlove; Khari Mateen | 3:15 |
| 166. | "Tip the Scale" (featuring Dice Raw) | Thompson; Angry; Wright; Jenkins; Trotter; Morris | Questlove; Ray Angry; Richard Nichols; Khari Mateen | 4:17 |

Redford Suite
| No. | Title | Writer(s) | Producer(s) | Length |
|---|---|---|---|---|
| 167. | "Redford" (For Yia-Yia & Pappou) | Sufjan Stevens | Sufjan Stevens | 1:52 |
| 168. | "Possibility" (2nd Movement) | Angry; Thompson; Nichols | Questlove; Ray Angry; Richard Nichols | 0:55 |
| 169. | "Will to Power" (3rd Movement) | D.D. Jackson; Thompson | Questlove; D.D. Jackson | 1:03 |
| 170. | "Finality" (4th Movement) | Angry; Thompson; Nichols | Questlove; Ray Angry; Richard Nichols | 1:31 |

== Personnel ==
Credits for Undun adapted from liner notes.

- Ray Angry – producer
- Clifton Bell – inlay photography
- Mark Bengston – assistant engineer
- Leesa D. Brunson – A&R
- Dame "Tuba Gooding Jr." Bryson – group member, sousaphone
- Roberto Caiaffa – marketing
- Phonte Coleman – composer
- Levar Coppin – composer
- Robert "LB" Dorsey – engineer
- Kirk "Captain Kirk" Douglas – group member, guitar
- Daniel Felsenfeld – string arrangements
- Rick Friedrich – engineer, producer
- Larry Gold – arranger, cello
- Jason Goldstein – engineer, mixing
- Kenny J. Gravillis – art direction
- Kamal Gray – group member, keyboards
- D.D. Jackson – composer, producer
- Karl Jenkins – composer
- Karl B. Jenkins – A&R
- Doug Joswick – package production
- Mark Kelley – bass, group member
- Nick Koenig – engineer
- Phil Kramp – viola
- Dave Kutch – mastering
- Kristin Lee – violin
- Sean Lee – violin
- Tai Linzie – art coordinator, photo coordination
- Aaron Earl Livingston – vocals
- Steve Mandel – engineer, mixing
- Deborah Mannis-Gardner – sample clearance
- Mercedes Martinez – background vocals
- Khari Mateen – engineer, producer
- Hiro Matsuo – cello
- Deleno Matthews – composer
- Tracey Moore – background vocals
- John Morgan – assistant engineer
- Richard Nichols – A&R, art direction, executive producer, producer
- James Poyser – group member, keyboards, producer
- Brent "Ritz" Reynolds – engineer, producer
- Todd Russell – art coordinator, photo coordination
- Lenny S. – A&R
- Chris Sclafani – mixing assistant
- Sean C & LV – producer
- Jamel Shabazz – cover photo
- Jon Smeltz – engineer, mixing
- Sufjan Stevens – composer, engineer, mixing, producer
- Mark Tavern – A&R
- Anna Tes – design
- Ahmir "Questlove" Thompson – composer, drums, group member, producer
- Tariq "Black Thought" Trotter – composer, group member, vocals
- Frank "Knuckles" Walker – group member, percussion
- Kristen Yiengst – art coordinator, photo coordination

== Charts ==
=== Weekly charts ===
| Chart (2011) | Peak position |
|---|---|
| Swiss Albums (Schweizer Hitparade) | 30 |
| US Billboard 200 | 17 |
| US Top R&B/Hip-Hop Albums (Billboard) | 4 |
| US Top Rap Albums (Billboard) | 2 |

=== Year-end charts ===
| Chart (2012) | Position |
|---|---|
| US Top R&B/Hip-Hop Albums (Billboard) | 50 |

== See also ==
- A Prince Among Thieves
