= The Roots =

American hip-hop band

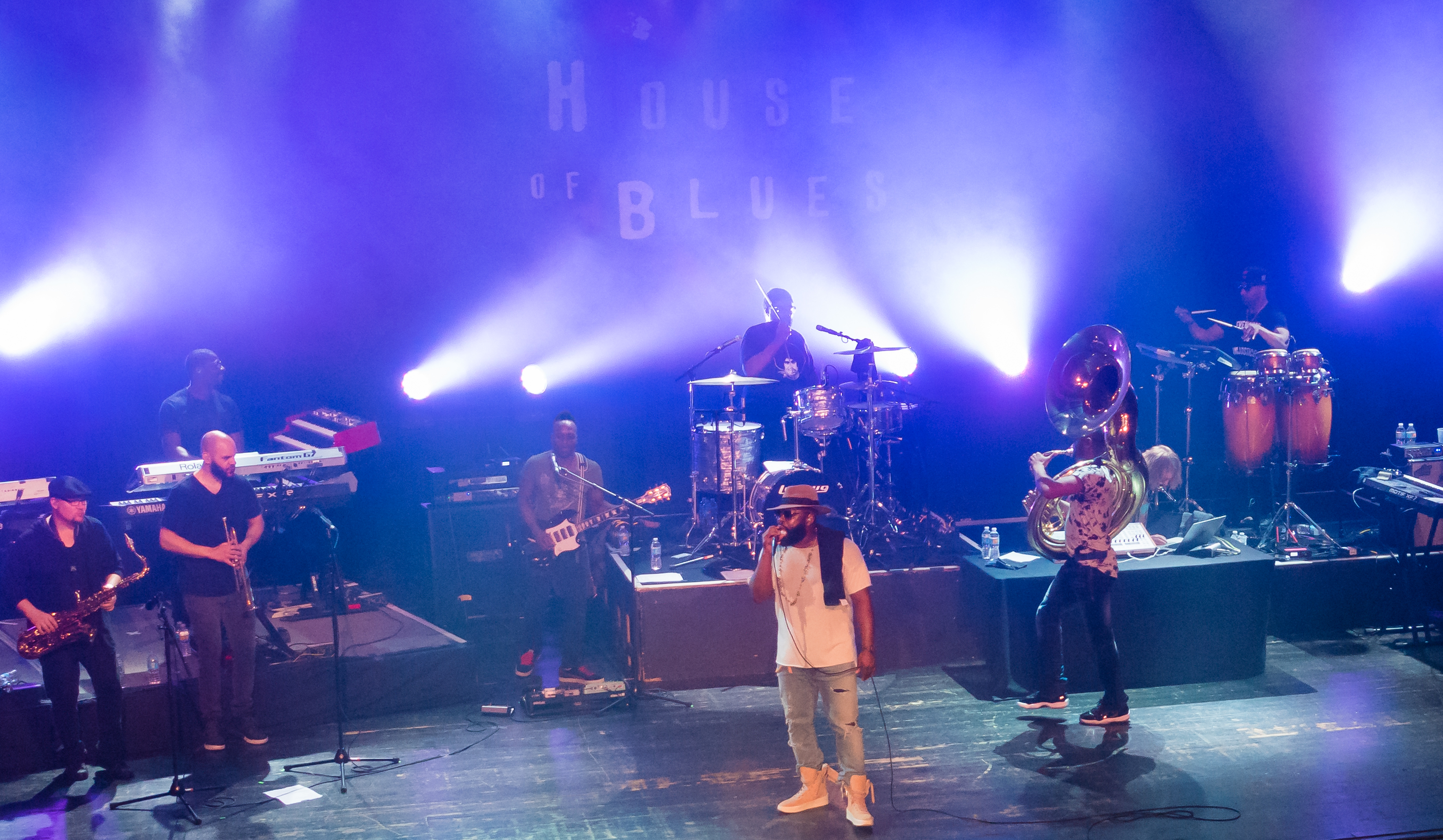
- The Roots performing in 2016

Background information
- Also known as: Black to the Future; Radio Activity; The Fifth Dynasty; The Legendary Roots Crew; The Square Roots; The Tonight Show Band
- Origin: Philadelphia, Pennsylvania, U.S.
- Genres: Hip hop; alternative rap; conscious rap; progressive soul; progressive rap
- Works: The Roots discography
- Years active: 1987–present
- Labels: Def Jam; DGC; Interscope Geffen A&M; MCA; Okayplayer
- Spinoffs: Nouveau Riche; Soulquarians
- Members: Black Thought; Questlove; Captain Kirk Douglas; Damon "Tuba Gooding Jr." Bryson; Raymond Angry; James Poyser; Mark Kelley; Stro Elliot; Kamal Gray; Ian Hendrickson-Smith; Dave Guy
- Past members: Josh "Rubberband" Abrams; Malik B.; Owen Biddle; Kid Crumbs; Jeremy Ellis; Dice Raw; F. Knuckles; Hub; Ben Kenney; Martin Luther; Rahzel; Scratch; Scott Storch; Nikki Yeoh
- Website: theroots.com

The Roots are an American hip-hop band formed in 1987 by rapper Tariq "Black Thought" Trotter and drummer Ahmir "Questlove" Thompson in Philadelphia. The Roots serve as the house band on NBC's The Tonight Show Starring Jimmy Fallon, having served in the same role on Late Night with Jimmy Fallon from 2009 to 2014. The regular members of The Roots on The Tonight Show are Captain Kirk Douglas (guitar), Mark Kelley (bass), James Poyser (keyboards), Ian Hendrickson-Smith (saxophone), Damon "Tuba Gooding Jr." Bryson (sousaphone), Stro Elliot (keyboards and drums), Dave Guy (trumpet), Kamal Gray (keyboards), and Raymond Angry (keyboards).

The Roots are known for a jazzy and eclectic approach to hip hop featuring live musical instruments and the group's work has consistently been met with critical acclaim. ThoughtCo ranked the band number seven on its list of the 25 Best Hip-Hop Groups of All-Time, calling them "Hip-hop's first legitimate band."

In addition to the band's music, several members of the Roots are involved in side projects, including record production, acting, and regularly serving as guests on other musicians' albums and live shows.

== History ==
=== 1987–1993: Early years ===
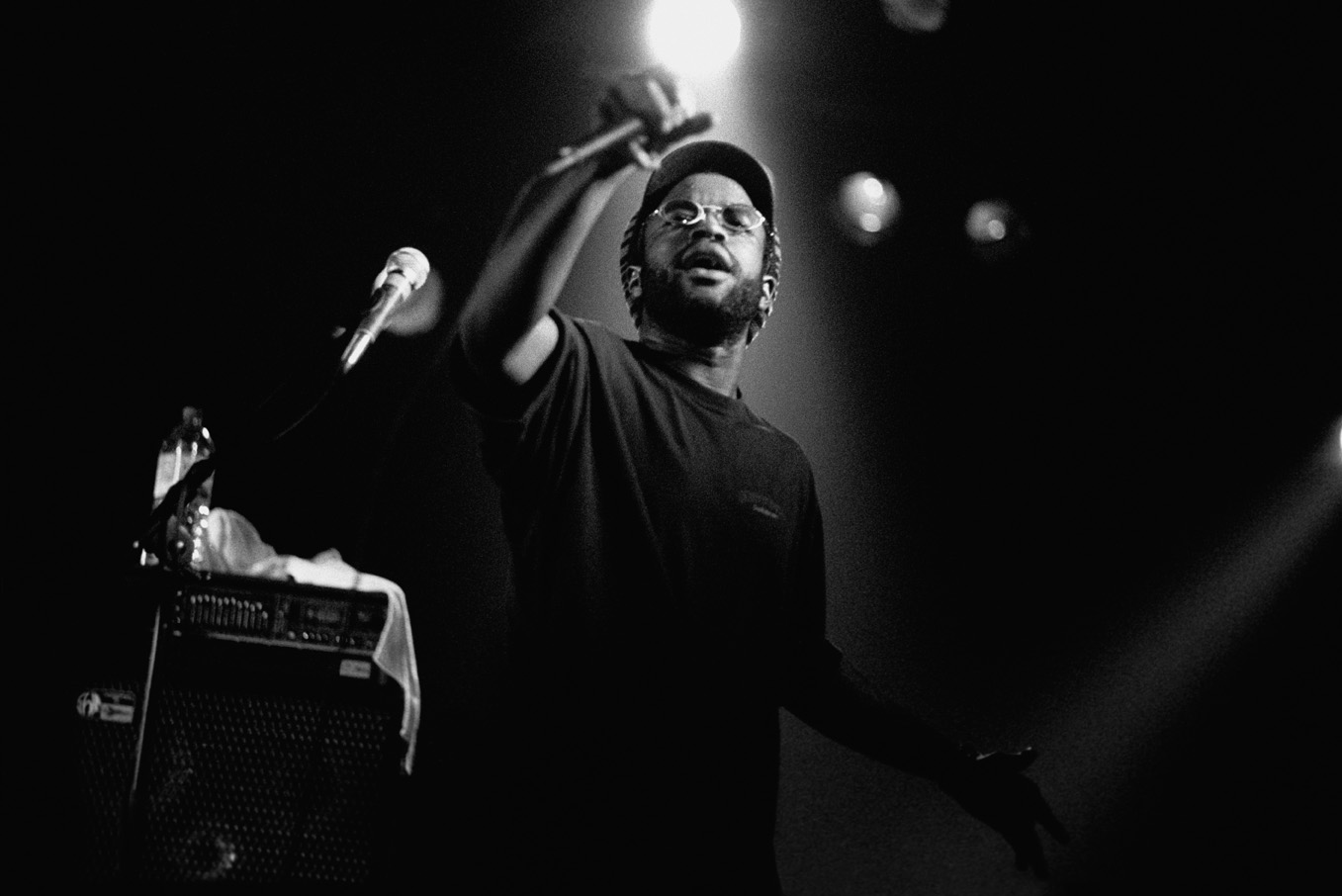
Black Thought with the Roots in 1999

The Roots originated in Philadelphia with Ahmir "Questlove" Thompson and Tariq "Black Thought" Trotter while they were both attending the Philadelphia High School for the Creative and Performing Arts. They would busk out on the street corners with Questlove playing bucket drums and Black Thought rapping over his rhythms. Their first organized gig was a talent show in 1989 at the school where they used the name Radio Activity, which began a series of name changes that progressed through Black to the Future and then The Square Roots. Another MC, Malik B., and a permanent bass player, Leonard "Hub" Hubbard, were added to the band before the release of their first album. In 1992, they dropped the "Square" from "Square Roots" because a local folk group had claim to the name.

Unable to break through in their native Philadelphia, the band briefly moved to London, where they would release their 1993 debut, Organix. The album was released and sold independently. In the span of a year, the band developed a cult following in Europe, boosted by touring. The Roots would receive offers from music labels, and the band eventually signed with DGC/Geffen.

=== 1994–1997: Do You Want More?!!!??! and Illadelph Halflife ===
The Roots' first album for DGC, Do You Want More?!!!??!, was released in the United States the year following the signing. During the recording process, beatboxer Rahzel and keyboardist Scott Storch joined the band. The addition of the two members provided additional depth to the band's sound, and energized the Roots' Philadelphia jam sessions, which the band would later sample for songs on Do You Want More?!!!??!. The album's opening track features Black Thought introducing the band's sound as "organic hip hop jazz"; the album is characterized by a combination of contemporary East Coast hip hop and jazz influences, with a heavy reliance on Storch's Fender Rhodes and the occasional saxophone of guest musician Steve Coleman. The album spawned three singles with accompanying videos: "Proceed", "Distortion to Static", and "Silent Treatment". The album was a moderate hit among alternative music fans, boosted by the group's appearance at Lollapalooza. In 1995, the band performed at the Montreux Jazz Festival. In the years since its release, Do You Want More?!!!??! has come to be considered to be a classic jazz rap album.

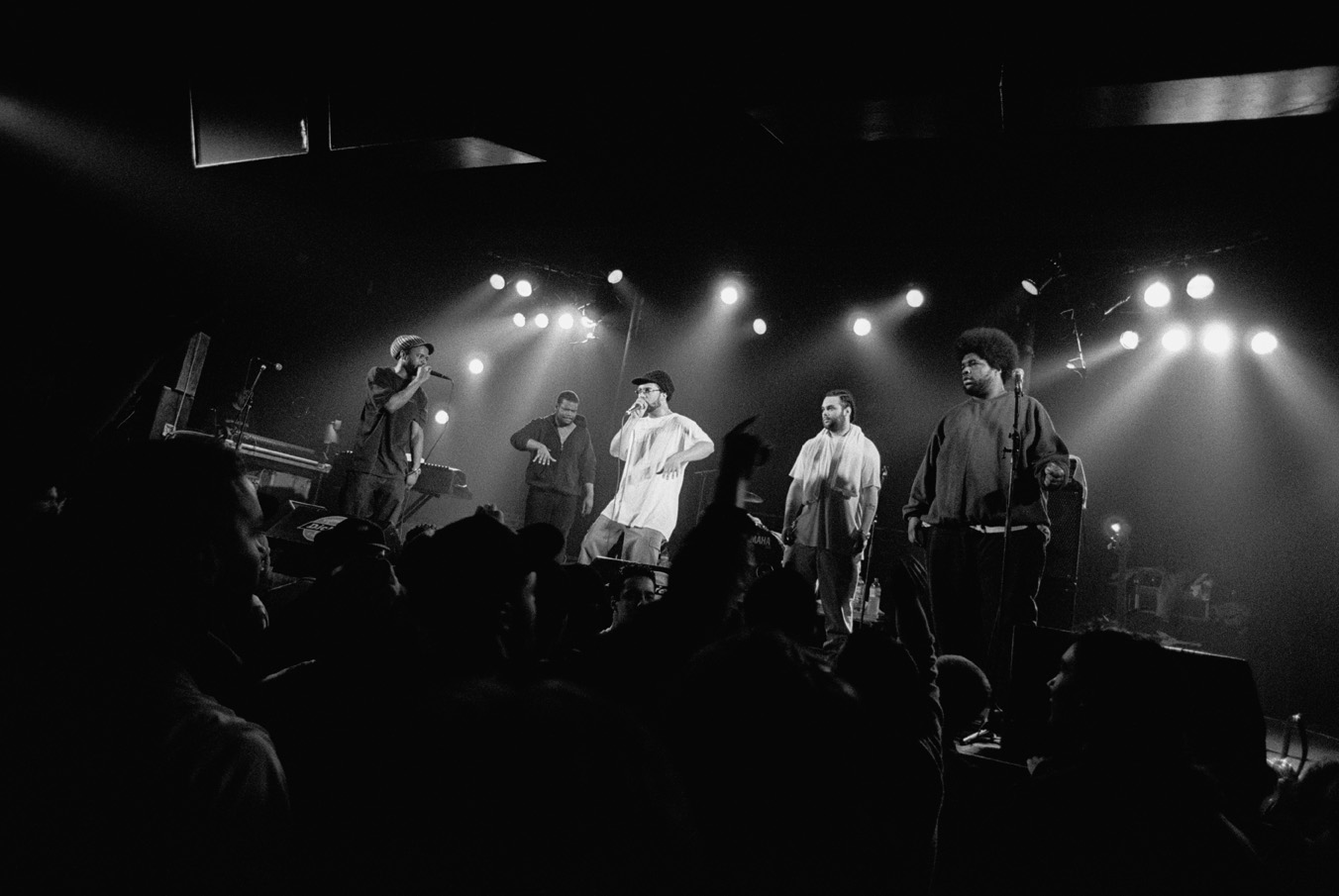
The Roots in 1999

The 1996 release Illadelph Halflife was the group's third album and their first to break the Top 40 on the Billboard 200 chart, spurred in part by MTV's airplay of the video for "What They Do" (a parody of rap video clichés) and "Clones", which was their first single to reach the top five on the rap charts. The band added "What They Do" was also the group's first single to hit the Top 40 of Billboard's charts, reaching a peak of No. 34. Scott Storch left the band and was replaced by a new keyboardist, Kamal Gray. The band's sound would take a darker turn during this period, heavily influenced by the Wu-Tang Clan and the RZA's grimy and haunting production style, replete with samples from old jazz and classical music. The album is also notable for its many guests and collaborators, including Common, D'Angelo, Q-Tip, and others. These collaborations would provide the foundation for the creation of the Soulquarians and forged the Roots' association with the neo-soul subgenre.

=== 1998–2000: Breakthrough with Things Fall Apart ===
The group released Things Fall Apart in 1999 (named after Things Fall Apart, a novel by Chinua Achebe, which in turn was named after a line from "The Second Coming" by W.B. Yeats). This was their breakthrough album, peaking at No. 4 on the Billboard 200 charts and earning a gold record, signifying U.S. sales of at least 500,000 units. The album was eventually certified platinum in April 2013. Mos Def contributed to the track entitled "Double Trouble". The track "Act Too" features Common. The track "You Got Me", a duet with R&B singer Erykah Badu and Eve and Jill Scott intended by Black Thought for the "unconscious" population, peaked at No. 39 on the Billboard Hot 100 charts. At the 42nd Grammy Awards "You Got Me" won the award for Best Rap Performance By a Duo or Group and the album was nominated for Best Rap Album.

Steve Huey of AllMusic perceived "a strong affinity for the neo-soul movement" in the album. First-time cameos on Things Fall Apart for Philadelphia natives Beanie Sigel and Eve helped to earn them major record deals later (with Roc-A-Fella and Ruff Ryders, respectively). After this album, Dice Raw left the collective to record his solo debut album Reclaiming the Dead. In the summer, the band performed at the Woodstock '99 concert in New York state.

=== 2001–2005: Phrenology and The Tipping Point ===
Several members, including longtime member Malik B., left the group. In December 2001, the Roots backed Jay-Z for his MTV Unplugged concert. With heightened popularity came mounting pressure. The Roots released Phrenology (named after the pseudoscience of the same name) in 2002. Despite not charting as high as Things Fall Apart, reaching a peak of No. 28 on the charts, Phrenology was commercially successful, being certified gold, and earning a Grammy nomination for Best Rap Album. At the time, however, there came rumors that the Roots were losing interest in their signing with MCA. During this time, the band backed Jay-Z for his 2003 farewell concert in Madison Square Garden and appeared in the accompanying Fade to Black concert film.

After Phrenology, Ben Kenney and Scratch both left the group; Kenney joined the rock band Incubus. This culminated with the release of 2004's The Tipping Point, the byproduct of several jam sessions. The album earned two more Grammy nominations: one for Best Urban/Alternative Performance for the track "Star/Pointro" and another for Best Rap Performance By A Duo Or Group for the track "Don't Say Nuthin'." The Tipping Point peaked at No. 4 on the Billboard album chart. In 2005, Home Grown! The Beginner's Guide to Understanding the Roots, Volumes 1 & 2, a two-disc compilation album, was released. The Roots were among several performers on the 2006 film Dave Chappelle's Block Party, whose event took place on September 18, 2004, and was released on film two years later.

=== 2006–2008: Game Theory and Rising Down ===
Game Theory was released August 29, 2006, on Def Jam Recordings. Questlove describes the album as being very dark and reflective of the political state in America. The first single from the album, "Don't Feel Right", appeared on the internet in May 2006, and is available for free download on several websites. The album's first video, titled "The Don't Feel Right Trilogy", premiered on August 21, 2006, and features three songs, "In the Music", "Here I Come", and "Don't Feel Right". It earned an 83 on Metacritic and two Grammy Nominations. The late J Dilla is honoured on different occasions throughout the album. Track 1 is credited to be "Supervised by J Dilla". Track 13 "Can't Stop This" is devoted to his persona, the first part being an edited version of a track ("Time: The Donut of the Heart") of his Donuts album, released three days before his death. This version comprises vocals by Black Thought. Secondly, a string of kindred artists reminisce about J Dilla in the form of answering machine messages.

The Roots' eighth studio album, Rising Down, was released on April 29, 2008, the 16-year anniversary of the 1992 Los Angeles riots. In the weeks before the album's release, the original first single "Birthday Girl", a radio-friendly collaboration with Fall Out Boy's Patrick Stump was removed from the album reportedly because it did not fit in with the album's tone. It remained as a digital download available from iTunes as a bonus track, as well as on international releases. Picking up where Game Theory left off, the album maintains a dark and political tone, with Black Thought and several guests venting about the ills of society. The album's guests include Chrisette Michele, Common, Mos Def, Saigon, Styles P, Talib Kweli, and Wale; it also features Philadelphia artists Dice Raw, DJ Jazzy Jeff, Peedi Crakk, Greg Porn, and Truck North, as well as former member Malik B. Rising Down features the Roots incorporating a more electronic and synth-heavy feel into their sound. Rising Down was released to critical acclaim, garnering an overall score of 80 on Metacritic. The album's first single was "Rising Up" featuring Chrisette Michele and Wale.

The Roots was among hundreds of artists whose material was destroyed in the 2008 Universal Studios fire. Responding to an earlier Times report, Questlove confirmed that the masters for Do You Want More?!!!??! and Illadelph Halflife were among those lost in the fire.

=== 2009–2010: How I Got Over and Wake Up! ===
How I Got Over reflects the relief the band felt at the end of the Bush administration and the beginning of the Obama presidency. Guests include Blu, Phonte, and Patty Crash. A cover of Cody Chesnutt's song "Serve This Royalty" was expected to be covered on the album, similar to the group's reworking of his single for "The Seed 2.0" on Phrenology. Rather than relying on samples, the album was recorded live, with covers (including "Celestial Blues", featuring the song's original artist, Andy Bey) being reinterpreted by the band. The album was released on June 22, 2010.

On June 24, 2009, the Roots debuted the first single and title track from the album live on Late Night with Jimmy Fallon. The song features longtime Roots collaborator Dice Raw. The Roots collaborated with R&B singer John Legend on the album Wake Up!. The album was released on September 21, 2010, and was publicized two days later with a live concert at Terminal 5 in New York City with John Legend and Jennifer Hudson that was streamed on YouTube. On October 30, 2010, the Roots and John Legend played live at the Rally to Restore Sanity and/or Fear in Washington, D.C.

=== 2011–2014: Undun, ...And Then You Shoot Your Cousin and side projects ===
The Roots released their 13th album Undun via Def Jam Records on December 6, 2011. The first single "Make My" leaked on October 17, 2011. Undun tells the story of their semifictional character, Redford Stephens, who struggles unsuccessfully to avoid a life of crime and fast money. The album's name is inspired by The Guess Who's song "Undun", and the character was named after the Sufjan Stevens song "Redford". The album features artists including Aaron Livingston, Big K.R.I.T., Phonte, Dice Raw, Greg Porn, Truck North, Bilal, and Sufjan Stevens. The Roots also collaborated with R&B singer Betty Wright on the 2011 album Betty Wright: The Movie, credited to Betty Wright and the Roots. The album, co-produced by Wright and Questlove, was nominated for a 2012 Grammy in the "Best Traditional R&B Performance."

The Roots and Elvis Costello released Wise Up Ghost on September 17, 2013, via Blue Note Records. On July 22, 2013, they released a music video for the first single, "Walk Us Uptown". The Roots released ...And Then You Shoot Your Cousin on May 19, 2014. The first single, "When the People Cheer", was released on April 7, 2014. Black Thought described the album as a satirical look at violence in hip-hop and American society overall.

=== 2015–present: End Game ===
In an interview with Fuse TV, Questlove said he also had "two or three secret, major musical projects that I'm working on that I can't really talk about." In September 2016 The Roots backed up Usher at a Global Citizen benefit concert in Montreal, Quebec, Canada, launching speculation of a major collaboration between the two acts. In October 2016, the group announced their 17th studio album, End Game. Black Thought in June 2017 further revealed that producers 9th Wonder and Salaam Remi will contribute to the album, and in March 2019, Questlove revealed there will be an unreleased J Dilla beat on it as well. Updates referencing the album in August 2025 made note of potential Benny the Butcher and Syd from The Internet features and speculated a release date of early 2026.

== Members ==
The Roots' original lineup included Tariq "Black Thought" Trotter (MC) and Ahmir "Questlove" Thompson (drums), classmates at the Philadelphia High School for the Creative and Performing Arts. As they began to play at school and on local streets, they added bassist Josh "The Rubberband" Abrams, who went on to form the jazz group The Josh Abrams Quartet. They later added another MC, Malik Abdul Basit-Smart ("Malik B."), Leonard Nelson "Hub" Hubbard (bass), and Scott Storch (keyboards). Kenyatta "Kid Crumbs" Warren (MC) was in the band for Organix, the Roots' first album release. Another MC, Dice Raw, joined the band in cameo appearances on later albums. The band filled Storch's position with Kamal Gray (keyboards), who continues in that capacity. Kamal Gray did not play with the Roots on Late Night With Jimmy Fallon between April or May and early September 2012. His absence was not publicly explained, however on the September 17, 2012 (NBC's 'Late Night' 700th) episode, Gray returned to the group. Beatboxer Rahzel was a band member from 1995 to 2001. Alongside Rahzel was turntablist/vocalist Scratch, who also DJ'd in live concerts. However Scratch left abruptly in 2003. Malik B. left the group in 1999 for personal reasons but continued to record, making occasional cameos on some albums. Guitarist Ben Kenney had a brief stint with the group and contributed to the Phrenology album, but left to join Incubus as bassist. Percussionist Frank Knuckles joined the lineup in 2002 and guitarist "Captain" Kirk Douglas replaced Kenney. Vocalist Martin Luther toured with the Roots in 2003 and 2004 and contributed to the Tipping Point album. The group announced in August 2007 that its longtime bassist Leonard Hubbard was leaving. Owen Biddle was the band's bassist in 2007–2011. Sousaphone player Damon "Tuba Gooding Jr." Bryson joined the band in 2007.

The band announced on August 25, 2011 that Owen Biddle had left, replaced by Mark Kelley. On The Tonight Show Starring Jimmy Fallon, James Poyser plays keyboards. Raymond Angry also regularly sits in on keyboards.

Because most of the band members hail from Philadelphia and its surrounding area, they showed their support for the Philadelphia Phillies during the 2009 World Series against the New York Yankees, displaying Phillies memorabilia when performing on Late Night with Jimmy Fallon. On the episode which aired the day after the Yankees clinched the title, Questlove stated "No comment!" on the show's intro (when he usually states the episode number), and had a Yankees logo purposely displayed upside-down on his drumset. In 2010, the group showed support for the Philadelphia Flyers during their run to the 2010 Stanley Cup Finals by having the team logo on their drumset, and again in 2014 when the Flyers faced the New York Rangers in the first round of the playoffs on The Tonight Show Starring Jimmy Fallon.

In April 2017, Frank Knuckles left the Roots due to family issues, and has not appeared on The Tonight Show since then. Later in August 2017, Knuckles sued Questlove, Black Thought, and the band manager Shawn Gee over unpaid royalties.

In June 2017, Questlove announced in an interview that producer and performer Stro Elliot is an official member of the Roots.

On July 29, 2020, founding member Malik B. died at the age of 47.

== Band lineup ==
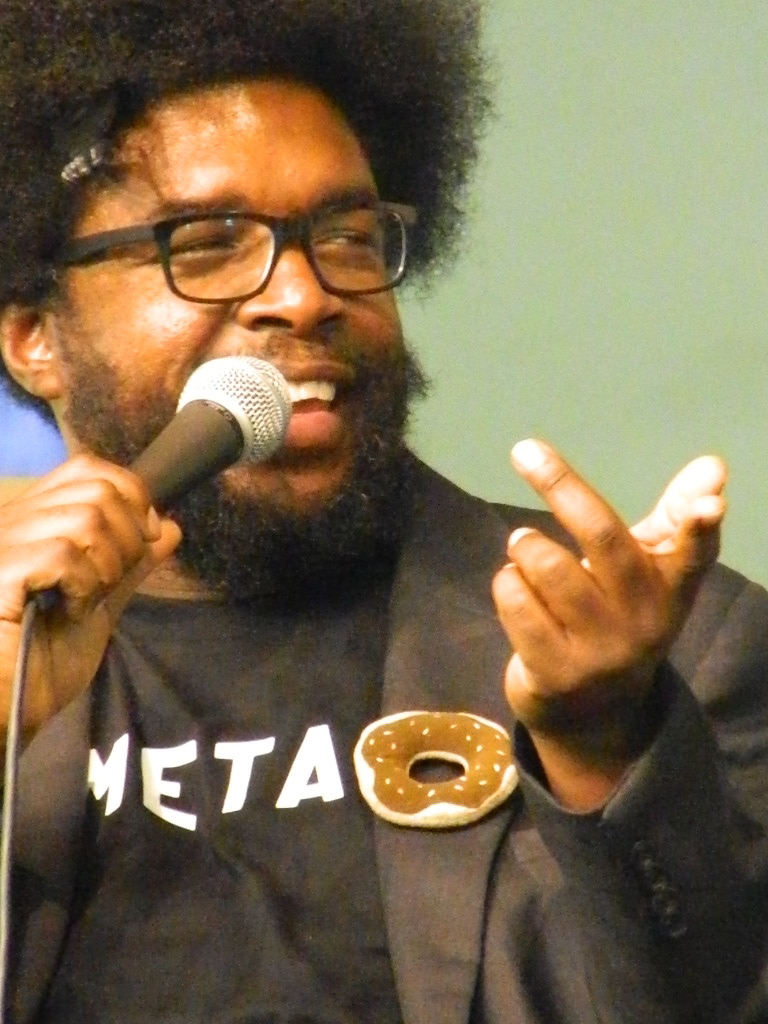
Questlove in discussion during book signing, 2013.

=== Current members ===
- Black Thought – rap and singing vocals (1987–present)
- Questlove – drums, backing rap vocals, beatboxing (1987–present)
- Kamal Gray – keyboards, backing rap vocals (1994–present)
- Captain Kirk Douglas – guitars, singing vocals (2003–present)
- Tuba Gooding, Jr. (Damon Bryson) – sousaphone, tuba (2007–present)
- James Poyser – keyboards (2009–present)
- Raymond Angry – keyboards (2010–present)
- Mark Kelley – bass, synthesizer bass, moog (2011–present)
- Ian Hendrickson-Smith – flutes, saxophones (2015–present)
- Jeremy Ellis – beatbox, sampling, Maschine, Arcade machine sampler, midi fighter, finger drumming (2014–present)
- Dave Guy – trumpet (2015–present)
- Stro Elliot – beatbox, percussion, sampling, tambourine, Ableton, HandSonic, SPD-SX, finger drumming, keyboards (2017–present)

=== Former members ===
- Malik B. – rap vocals (1987–1999; died 2020)
- Josh 'Rubberband' Abrams – bass (1992–1994)
- Kenyatta 'Kid Crumbs' Warren – rap vocals (1993)
- Scott Storch – keyboards (1993–1995)
- Nikki Yeoh – keyboards (1994)
- Hub – bass (1994–2007; died 2021)
- Rahzel – beatboxing (1995–2001)
- Dice Raw – rap vocals (1995–2001) (member); (2002–present) (frequent collaborator with the band)
- Scratch – beatboxing (1996–2003)
- F. Knuckles – percussion (2001–2017)
- Ben Kenney – guitars, bass (2000–2003)
- Martin Luther – guitars, vocals (2003–2004)
- Owen Biddle – bass (2007–2011)

== Touring and other work ==
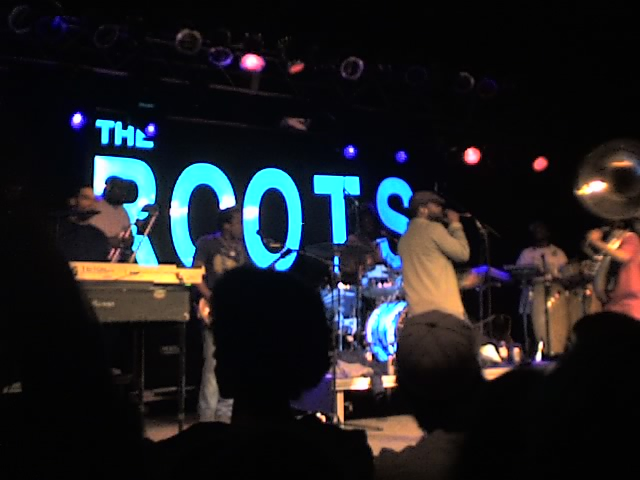
The Roots performing in 2007

The band tours extensively, and their live sets are frequently hailed as the best in the genre. The Black Eyed Peas opened for The Roots in a performance at Rochester Institute of Technology in May 2001. In 2006, the band played a concert in NYC's Radio City Music Hall with Common, Nas, Talib Kweli, and Big Daddy Kane. The same year, they backed Jay-Z for his Reasonable Doubt Concert, a celebration of the 10-year anniversary of the release of his first album.

In 1994, the Roots appeared on the Red Hot Organization's compilation album, Stolen Moments: Red Hot + Cool. The album, meant to raise awareness and funds in support of the AIDS epidemic in relation to the African American community, was heralded as "Album of the Year" by Time magazine. They have been highly involved in many other Red Hot Organization productions, including the 1998 album Red Hot + Rhapsody and the 2001 album Red Hot + Indigo, a tribute to Duke Ellington.

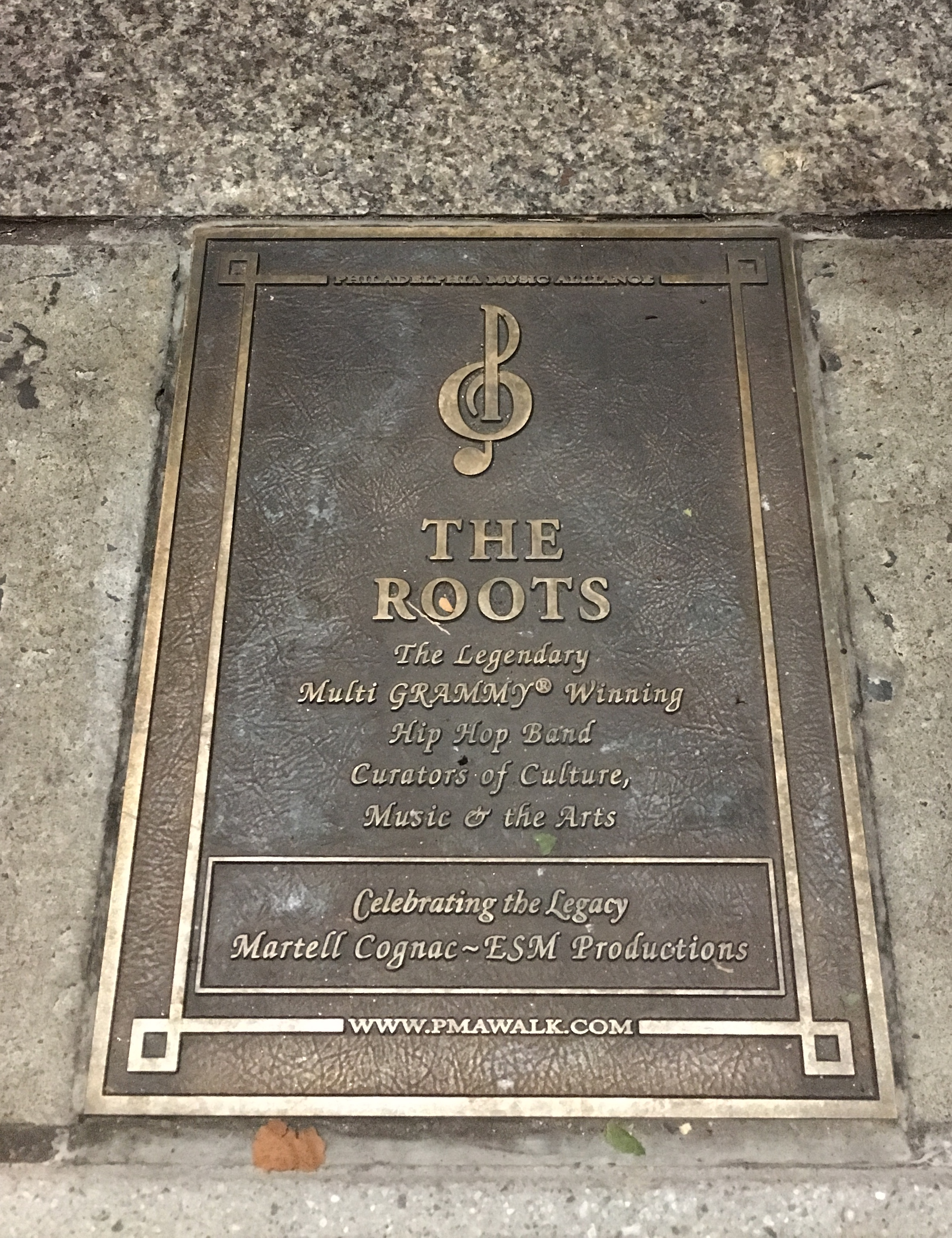
The Roots' Philadelphia Music Alliance Walk of Fame marker located on South Broad Street

The Roots have been featured in four movies: Dave Chappelle's Block Party, both performing album songs and playing as a backing band for other artists; Spike Lee's Bamboozled; Marc Levin's Brooklyn Babylon, in which Black Thought plays the protagonist, Solomon, and former band member Rahzel narrates; and Chasing Liberty, starring Mandy Moore. Black Thought and Questlove were both featured in the movie Brown Sugar. Black Thought made an appearance in the film Love Rome as Tariq Trotter, and Questlove currently appears in the recent documentary movie about TBC Brass Band called From the Mouthpiece on Back, which lists the Roots as one of the executive producers of the movie.

The Roots were featured on the album True Love by Toots and the Maytals, which won the Grammy Award in 2004 for Best Reggae Album, and showcased many notable musicians including Willie Nelson, Eric Clapton, Jeff Beck, Trey Anastasio, Gwen Stefani / No Doubt, Ben Harper, Bonnie Raitt, Manu Chao, Ryan Adams, Keith Richards, Toots Hibbert, Paul Douglas, Jackie Jackson, Ken Boothe, and The Skatalites.

The band guest-performed with the Dave Matthews Band during their 2007 summer tour. Members of the Roots played in various forms as well as a whole band on DMB's back to back concerts at Alpine Valley Music Theatre in East Troy, Wisconsin. In 2007, the band performed at an NAACP tribute to Bono, covering U2's "Sunday Bloody Sunday" and "Pride (In the Name of Love)." Black Thought mixed in lines from the band's own "False Media."

The group hosts a highly anticipated jam session every year the night before the Grammys. The Roots jam session, produced by Okayplayer, Goodtime Girl Entertainment, and Keldof, has been attended by celebrities ranging from Jay-Z, Beyoncé, and Tom Cruise to Don Cheadle, Jeremy Piven, and Prince, with impromptu performances from Snoop Dogg and Corrine Bailey Rae to Queen Latifah, Matisyahu, Fall Out Boy, and Dave Chappelle.

Billed as "The Roots," Questlove, Douglas, and Biddle made an appearance on The Colbert Report on April 15, 2008, when Stephen Colbert spent a week in Philadelphia prior to the 2008 Pennsylvania Democratic primary. During the appearance, they performed the intro song to the show, and closed the episode with a rendition of the "Star Spangled Banner."

The Roots are featured on the Men in Black Original Soundtrack (1997) with the song "The Notic" with neo-soul singer D'Angelo. The song "Here I Come" was featured in the films Superbad, Hancock, and Step Up 3D. "Here I Come" is also featured in many video games including Project Gotham Racing 4. The song "The Seed 2.0" featuring Cody ChesnuTT was featured in the movies Collateral and I Think I Love My Wife, as well as the Without a Trace episode "Candy." The song "Don't Say Nuthin" was featured in the first-season episode, "Busey and the Beach," of HBO's Entourage. The song "Guns Are Drawn," featuring Aaron Livingston, was featured in a season six episode of CBS' Cold Case. The band also collaborated with musician BT on the song "Tao of the Machine," which was featured in the film Blade II along with the Japanese bonus disc for the album Emotional Technology.

In 2008, the band (then consisting of Black Thought, Questlove, Douglas, Bryson, Knuckles, Gray, and Biddle) appeared on the popular kids' show Yo Gabba Gabba!, performing "Lovely, Love My Family". Three years later, in 2011, the band returned to the show to perform "We Have Fun," with Poyser joining Gray on keyboards, and Kelley (replacing Biddle) playing upright bass.

The band also did a secret jam session at the Oulipo Ballroom in Kentucky in 2009. In 2012, they played during the NHL Winter Classic at Citizen's Bank Park in Philadelphia and at Austin City Limits Music Festival (ACL) in Austin, Texas. In 2013, they performed at the Gathering of the Vibes Music Festival at Seaside Park in Bridgeport, Connecticut.

The Roots host the Roots Picnic, an annual all-day music festival in Philadelphia, every June. In 2017, they headlined the 2017 NBA All Star game pregame introductions and performed a musical show with various guests titled "The Evolution of Greatness." The Roots Picnic Experience has also taken place in Los Angeles, California.

== Late Night and The Tonight Show ==
In March 2009, the Roots became the official house band on Late Night with Jimmy Fallon, with "Here I Come" as the show's theme. When Jimmy Fallon became the host of The Tonight Show in February 2014, the Roots became the house band for that show.

The Roots are featured heavily throughout the show, providing the bumper music in and out of commercials, as well as the opening song "Here I Come" and playing the show off the air. Fallon frequently interacts with the band during the course of the show, and they occasionally provide snippets of music for some monologue running jokes such as Funkin' GoNuts. They also provide music and drum rolls for the games with show guests, along with theme songs for the games and segments like Darts of Insanity, Wheel of Carpet Samples, and Christmas Sweaters.

On November 22, 2011, US Congresswoman and presidential candidate Michele Bachmann was a guest on Late Night. For her entrance, the Roots controversially played a snippet from Fishbone's 1985 song, "Lying Ass Bitch" resulting in apologies from Fallon, Questlove for The Roots, and NBC. The incident nearly resulted in the Roots being dismissed from the show, but the timing of the Thanksgiving holiday and a national security gaffe by Bachmann shortly after helped defuse the situation in the media. NBC now approves all walk-on songs prior to the filming of each show.

=== Sketches ===
- One of the first sketches involving the Roots was "Freestyling with the Roots." Fallon finds an audience member and gets them to talk about themselves and a topic. The information is relayed to Trotter along with a genre of music, and they then compose a song on the spot. In the early days of the show in 2009, there was apprehension about their overall fit with the show, but after the first appearance of this sketch and its successful reception, "....They knew they were there for life."
- Thank You Notes, a segment every Friday, involves keyboardist James Poyser prominently. The segment starts with "Can I get some thank you writing music, James?" with Poyser playing and typically acting upset. Fallon then tries to engage with him to get him to smile before continuing the segment.
- Slow Jam the News features Fallon and Trotter, often with a celebrity guest, rhyming over a "slow-jam" played by the Roots. The lyrics are often political or current events related, with guests usually appearing to talk about an issue pertinent to them. Brian Williams is a frequent popular guest "vocalist," talking about the news as if he were still behind his anchor desk. Some of the notable guest slow-jammers include former President Barack Obama and former Governor Mitt Romney. Like the majority of the show, the segments are uploaded to YouTube after airing on NBC and often go viral; President Obama's clip has received over 8 million views and the Mitt Romney clip received 2.7 million views in less than a week.
- The Roots have contributed to additional online successes with the Classroom Instruments sketch. Fallon and a musical guest from the show will record an arrangement of a song with the Roots providing accompaniment on instruments that would be found in an elementary school music class. Examples of these instruments are wood blocks, pixiphones, kazoos, tambourines, melodica, shakers, and recorders. They have performed "Call Me Maybe" with Carly Rae Jepsen, "Blurred Lines" with Robin Thicke, "All I Want for Christmas" with Mariah Carey, "Hello" with Adele, "Runaway" with Janet Jackson, the Sesame Street theme song with several members of the cast, and "Enter Sandman" with Metallica.
- The Roots also provide the backing tracks for Fallon's and Justin Timberlake's episodic "History of Rap." As of March 2014, the History of Rap saga consists of 5 parts and 101 individual songs, all performed with a comedic approach. The fifth installment was performed during the inaugural week of Fallon's Tonight Show.

== Philanthropy ==
The founding members of The Roots attended a creative arts school in South Philadelphia called CAPA, and through a donation helped set up the CAPA Foundation, where they now sit on the board. The Roots partnership with the CAPA Foundation also includes opportunities for students to perform on national stages, learn through internships the business side of show business and a master class series.

After watching the 2010 documentary Waiting for Superman, Questlove was inspired to raise money for Harlem Village Academies, a group of charter schools.

== Awards and nominations ==
=== Grammy Awards ===
Year	Nominee / work	Award	Result
2000	"You Got Me" (with Erykah Badu)	Best Rap Performance by a Duo or Group	Won
2000	Things Fall Apart	Best Rap Album	Nominated
2004	Phrenology	Best Rap Album	Nominated
2005	"Star"	Best Urban/Alternative Performance	Nominated
2005	"Don't Say Nuthin'"	Best Rap Performance By a Duo/Group	Nominated
2007	"Don't Feel Right" (featuring Maimouna Youssef)	Best Rap Performance By a Duo/Group	Nominated
2007	Game Theory	Best Rap Album	Nominated
2011	"Hang On in There" (with John Legend)	Best Traditional R&B Vocal Performance	Won
2011	Wake Up! (with John Legend)	Best R&B Album	Won
2011	"Shine" (with John Legend)	Best R&B Performance by a Duo or Group with Vocals	Nominated
2011	"Wake Up Everybody" (with John Legend, Melanie Fiona & Common)	Best Rap/Sung Collaboration	Nominated
2011	How I Got Over	Best Rap Album	Nominated
2012	"Surrender" (with Betty Wright)	Best Traditional R&B Performance	Nominated
2013	Undun	Best Rap Album	Nominated

=== MTV Video Music Awards ===
Year	Nominee / work	Award	Result
2003	"The Seed 2.0"	MTV2 Award	Nominated

=== mtvU Woodie Awards ===
Year	Nominee / work	Award	Result
2004	The Roots	Road Woodie	Nominated
2004	The Roots	Welcome Back Woodie	Nominated

=== BET Awards ===
Year	Nominee / work	Award	Result
2005	The Roots	Best Group	Nominated
2009	The Roots	Best Group	Nominated

=== NAACP Image Awards ===
Year	Nominee / work	Award	Result
2005	The Roots	Outstanding Duo or Group	Nominated
2007	The Roots	Outstanding Duo or Group	Won
2011	Wake Up!	Outstanding Collaboration	Won
2011	Wake Up!	Outstanding Album	Won

- First Hip-Hop group to perform at Lincoln Center, January 2002
- Named one of the "Twenty Greatest Live Acts in the World" by Rolling Stone, 2003
- "Heroes Award" from the Philadelphia chapter of the Recording Academy, 2004 (Recipient)

== Discography ==
=== Studio albums ===
- Organix (1993)
- Do You Want More?!!!??! (1995)
- Illadelph Halflife (1996)
- Things Fall Apart (1999)
- Phrenology (2002)
- The Tipping Point (2004)
- Game Theory (2006)
- Rising Down (2008)
- How I Got Over (2010)
- Undun (2011)
- ...And Then You Shoot Your Cousin (2014)

=== Collaboration albums ===
- Wake Up! (2010) (with John Legend)
- Betty Wright: The Movie (2011) (with Betty Wright)
- Wise Up Ghost (2013) (with Elvis Costello)

=== Live albums ===
- The Roots Come Alive (1999)
- Jay-Z: Unplugged (2001) (with Jay-Z)
- The Roots Come Alive Too: DYWM30 Live at Blue Note NYC! (2025)

=== Notes ===
A distinctive feature of the Roots albums is the way tracks are numbered. With the exception of their collaboration albums, the Roots have used continuous track numbering beginning with their first studio album Organix through all following albums:

- 1–17: Organix
- 18–33: Do You Want More?!!!??!
- 34–53: Illadelph Halflife
- 54–71: Things Fall Apart
- 72–76: The Legendary
- 77–86: The Roots Come Alive
- 87–102: Phrenology
- 103–113: The Tipping Point
- 114–127: Game Theory
- 128–143: Rising Down
- 143–156: How I Got Over
- 157–170: Undun
- 171–181: ...And Then You Shoot Your Cousin

Questlove references this numbering system in his book Mo' Meta Blues: The World According to Questlove (specifically to the release of Illadelph Halflife), and explains it was "...our way of saying that it was a continuation of the work we had started on Organix and Do You Want More?!!!??!."

Similarly, the Roots' 2005 compilation albums, Home Grown! The Beginners Guide to Understanding The Roots, Vol. 1 and Vol. 2, feature a continuous track numbering beginning at negative 29 and counting up to zero. The implication is that this "Beginners Guide" would introduce new fans to the Roots and lead them to consuming the Roots' discography beginning at Organix.

- −29 thru −14: Home Grown! The Beginners Guide to Understanding The Roots, Vol. 1
- −13 thru 0: Home Grown! The Beginners Guide to Understanding The Roots, Vol. 2

== See also ==
- Questlove
- Black Thought
- Roots Picnic
- Questlove Supreme
