= ...And Then You Shoot Your Cousin =

Studio album by the Roots
- Released: May 19, 2014
- Recorded: 2013–2014
- Genre: Hip-hop
- Length: 33:22
- Label: Def Jam
- Producers: Black Thought; D.D. Jackson; Damion Ward; Joseph Simmons; Karl Jenkins; Mike Jerz; Richard Nichols; Ray Angry; Trapzillas; Questlove; The Wurxs

The Roots chronology
Wise Up Ghost (2013)	...And Then You Shoot Your Cousin (2014)

Singles from ...And Then You Shoot Your Cousin
- 1. "When the People Cheer" Released: May 6, 2014

...And Then You Shoot Your Cousin is the eleventh solo and fourteenth overall studio album by American hip-hop band the Roots. The album was released on May 19, 2014, by Def Jam Recordings.

According to Black Thought, "the album is conceptual like the previous one, but unlike Undun, ...And Then You Shoot Your Cousin features several characters in this story, not just one." Black Thought described the album as a satirical look at violence in hip-hop and American society overall.

== Release and promotion ==
In July 2012, Questlove said on his Twitter account that the title of the Roots' next album would have the initials &TYSYC and that it was being recorded, with a different sound to expect than from Undun. In the November 12, 2012 issue of The New Yorker, Questlove revealed that the album is tentatively named & Then You Shoot Your Cousin. In a June 2013 interview with Fuse TV, Questlove said he would prefer to release an album in the first quarter of the year, and that he also had other projects he was working on. In February 2014, in an interview with XXL, Black Thought said that the album would be a concept album in the spirit of Undun. He describes the work as a satire of hip-hop stereotypes featuring several different characters. On April 7, 2014, DJ Kast One premiered their first single from the album, "When the People Cheer", on Hot 97.

== Artwork ==
The album's artwork is a painting called Pittsburgh Memory by North Carolina-born painter Romare Bearden.

== Critical reception ==
Professional ratings
Aggregate scores
Source	Rating
Metacritic	70/100
Review scores
Source	Rating
AllMusic	3.5/5 stars
The A.V. Club	B−
Cuepoint (Expert Witness)	A−
Exclaim!	8/10
The Guardian	4/5 stars
Pitchfork	7.2/10
Rolling Stone	3.5/5 stars
Slant Magazine	4/5 stars
Spin	6/10
XXL	(XL)

...And Then You Shoot Your Cousin was met with generally positive reviews from music critics. At Metacritic, which assigns a normalized rating out of 100 to reviews from critics, the album received an average score of 70, based on 26 reviews. Andy Kellman of AllMusic felt that it may be the most challenging album from The Roots because of its experimental elements and variety of guest vocalists. Christopher R. Weingarten of Rolling Stone likened it to a hip-hop version of Nine Inch Nails' 1994 album The Downward Spiral because of its downbeat, existential theme. Omar Burgess of HipHopDX said that although the music is occasionally discordant, it is also "depressingly good, which makes it a bit of a confusing product in a Hip Hop landscape bifurcated by Golden Era romanticists and the turnt-up set." Robert Christgau wrote in Cuepoint that it is more consistent musically than Undun and is "a touching, upsetting meditation in which a sketchy gangsta wannabe embodies the limits of all striving."

Evan Rytlewski of The A.V. Club said, "With their 11th effort, The Roots have managed yet another album individualistic like little else in hip-hop, but unlike their best work this one's more interested in scholastic provocation than genuine pathos." Jesse Cataldo of Slant Magazine said, "A depiction of disorder and chaos, ... the album's approach [integrates] neatly into an overall sense of claustrophobic dread." Reed Jackson of XXL said, "The Roots have not only proven once again that they are one of hip-hop's most consistent acts, but also one of the genre's most important." Hilary Saunders of Paste said, "The Roots prove their mastery of mixing high and low culture for diverse audiences. It's a headier album, but one rife with significance."

== Commercial performance ==
The album debuted at number 11 on the Billboard 200 chart, with first-week sales of 19,786 copies in the United States. In its second week the album sold 5,856 more copies bringing its total album sales to 25,642.

== Track listing ==
No.	Title	Writer(s)	Producer(s)	Length
171.	"Theme from Middle of the Night" (performed by Nina Simone)	George Bassman; Paddy Chayefsky		1:27
172.	"Never" (featuring Patty Crash)	Adrian Charlie Guzman; Katrin Newman; Adolfo Salazar; Gregory Spearman; Tariq Trotter	Mike Jerz; Trapzillas; Richard Nichols; Black Thought; Questlove	3:54
173.	"When the People Cheer" (featuring Greg Porn)	Spearman; Trotter; Damion Ward	Damion Ward; Richard Nichols; Questlove; Black Thought	3:01
174.	"The Devil" (performed by Mary Lou Williams)	Mary Lou Williams		0:38
175.	"Black Rock" (featuring Dice Raw)	Kirk Dudley; Karl Jenkins; Cornell McFadden; Willie Pettis; Trotter; Archie Turner	Karl Jenkins; Richard Nichols; Questlove; Black Thought	2:41
176.	"Understand" (featuring Dice Raw & Greg Porn)	Greggory Bradsher; Jenkins; David Simpson; Spearman; Trotter	The Wurxs; Richard Nichols; Questlove; Black Thought	2:50
177.	"Dies Irae" (performed by Michel Chion)			1:07
178.	"The Coming" (featuring Mercedes Martinez)	D.D. Jackson; Richard Nichols; Joseph Simmons; Spearman	Richard Nichols; D.D. Jackson; Questlove; Black Thought; Joseph Simmons	3:01
179.	"The Dark (Trinity)" (featuring Dice Raw & Greg Porn)	Jenkins; Spearman; Trotter; Ward	Damion Ward; Richard Nichols; Questlove; Black Thought	5:17
180.	"The Unraveling" (featuring Raheem DeVaughn)	Ray Angry; Raheem DeVaughn; Trotter	Ray Angry; Richard Nichols; Questlove; Black Thought	4:17
181.	"Tomorrow" (featuring Raheem DeVaughn)	Angry; DeVaughn	Ray Angry; Richard Nichols; Questlove; Black Thought	5:06

== Charts ==
=== Weekly charts ===
Chart (2014)	Peak position
Australian Albums (ARIA)	34
Canadian Albums (Billboard)	11
Belgian Albums (Ultratop Flanders)	67
Belgian Albums (Ultratop Wallonia)	104
Dutch Albums (Album Top 100)	63
French Albums (SNEP)	127
German Albums (Offizielle Top 100)	79
Swiss Albums (Schweizer Hitparade)	9
UK R&B Albums (Official Charts)	9
US Billboard 200	11
US Top R&B/Hip-Hop Albums (Billboard)	3

=== Year-end charts ===
Chart (2014)	Position
US Top R&B/Hip-Hop Albums (Billboard)	85
