= Wise Up Ghost =

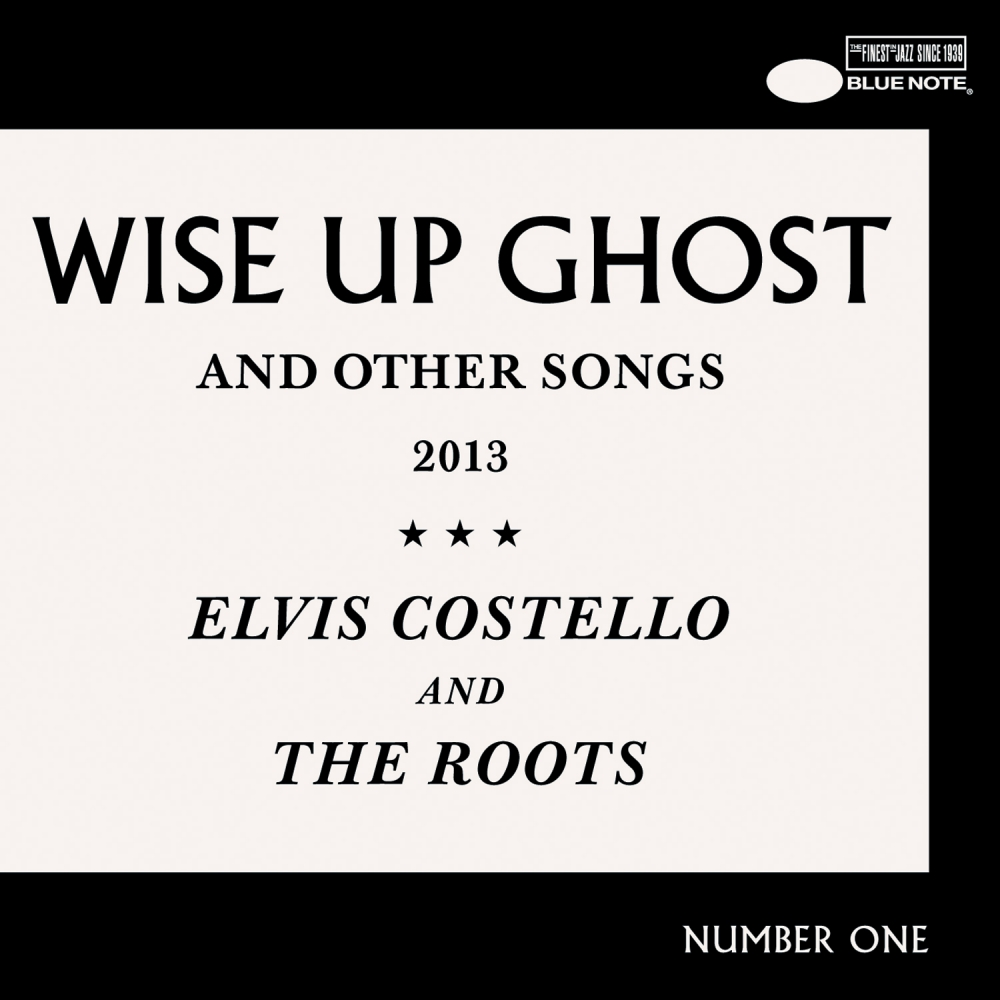

Studio album by Elvis Costello and the Roots
- Released: 17 September 2013
- Recorded: 2012–2013
- Genres: Funk; R&B
- Length: 55:54
- Label: Blue Note
- Producers: Elvis Costello; Questlove; Steven Mandel

Elvis Costello chronology
| National Ransom (2010) | Wise Up Ghost (2013) | Look Now (2018) |

The Roots chronology
| Undun (2011) | Wise Up Ghost (2013) | ...And Then You Shoot Your Cousin (2014) |

Singles from Wise Up Ghost
- 1. "Walk Us Uptown" Released: 23 July 2013

Wise Up Ghost is a collaborative studio album by British singer/songwriter Elvis Costello and American hip hop group the Roots growing out of Costello's appearances on Late Night With Jimmy Fallon, where the Roots are the house band.

Wise Up Ghost was released on 17 September 2013, by Blue Note Records. The album was well received by critics. Its first single, "Walk Us Uptown", was released on 23 July 2013.

== Background ==
In January 2013, it was announced that the Roots and Elvis Costello were working on an album. On 29 May 2013, it was announced that the album would be titled Wise Up Ghost and would be released on 17 September 2013. In a July 2013 interview with entertainment.ie, Roots drummer Questlove spoke about how the album started, saying: "Elvis first came on the Jimmy Fallon show in 2009. I knew he was a fan of the Voodoo album I did with D'Angelo, so we asked if he would be open to the idea of "remixing" his stuff. He was into it, so we did these radical versions of "High Fidelity" and "(I Don't Want to Go to) Chelsea", and he loved it. Then we did that a second time the next year, and then last year he was on when the show did a Bruce Springsteen tribute week. At that point, I kinda subliminally put out the idea of a larger collaboration. I was passive-aggressively suggesting it—I was too afraid to actually say, "Let's make a record together." Elvis Costello also spoke about the origins of the album, stating: "We were walking off the set of the show together after we did 'Brilliant Disguise' and Quest dropped this little code phrase to me. I don't think I ever want to tell people which band, which singer, and what record he named, but I knew what he meant right away. While I knew we couldn't make that record, I hoped that we might be able to make this record. It seemed like a good playground, a fabulous ride, to go in and play with a great band that has a broad-minded view of music. It felt like anything was possible."

Costello and Questlove have both discussed the writing process for the album. Costello stated: "Somebody would lead the way, the same way as any song construction. It was done in dialogue rather than in performance—like the game Exquisite Corpse, where one person's story follows the other, or when you fold a paper doll and then draw the legs on. We had already played together, we knew what that felt like, but we wanted different perspectives. We were really about a work-in-progress, mixing from day one, and developing as the ideas came through. But we didn't need to discuss it very much. We never had one conversation about what we were trying to do, we just did it. We played and the picture emerged, and then you try to sharpen the picture." Meanwhile, Questlove remarked: "Most powerful songs first have to sound powerful as a skeleton. So usually we started with just drums and piano, and if it was strong as a two-man project, then we'd go to next level and bring in the band. We would riff ideas, nonsensical words, then flesh that out once we had format down, and then Elvis would come back with lyrics and vocal parts intact. We started last August and, through December, once or twice a week he'd stop by. Initially we were emailing tracks, but we wanted real-time exchange. We recorded a lot of it in our tiny little dressing room at 30 Rock, not a traditional studio, but Elvis had no hang-ups about that."

About the recording process, Questlove stated: "We have like 4000 tracks in a database, so we gave a drum track to Elvis, and days later he came back with a full-fledged demo. We tried two more, then three more, and the next thing you know, we had something on our hands. With no label and no deadlines, the process could stay really relaxed." Costello gave the following comments on the recording process: "We didn't know what form it might take, whether it was a song or an EP or what. But ideas kept tumbling out, and they seemed connected by an approach to rhythm and lyric writing. I don't know the name for this music. It's a cauldron full of powders and potions, frogs and fingers, and that's what I call rock and roll—because that's what it was, originally. I'm not much bothered about the labels, though. What I care is whether we like it and can stand by it."

== Cover art ==
The all-text cover art of the album is modeled on the cover of Allen Ginsberg’s Howl and Other Poems.

== Critical reception ==
Professional ratings
Aggregate scores
| Source | Rating |
|---|---|
| Metacritic | 77/100 |
Review scores
| Source | Rating |
| AllMusic | 4/5 stars |
| The A.V. Club | C+ |
| Chicago Tribune | 3/5 stars |
| The Daily Telegraph | 5/5 stars |
| NME | 7/10 |
| The Observer | 3/5 stars |
| Paste | 8.7/10 |
| Rolling Stone | 3.5/5 stars |
| Spin | 8/10 |
| Slant Magazine | 4/5 stars |

Wise Up Ghost was met with generally positive reviews from music critics. At Metacritic, which assigns a normalised rating out of 100 to reviews from mainstream critics, the album received an average score of 77, based on 32 reviews. Stephen Thomas Erlewine of AllMusic gave the album four out of five stars, saying "This is an exquisitely detailed, imaginative record that pays back dividends according to how much knowledge, either of Costello or the Roots or their idols, a listener brings to the album. It's not exactly alienating but Wise Up Ghost does require work from its audience, and the more you know – and the more you listen – the better it seems." Kevin McFarland of The A.V. Club gave the album a C+, saying "At this point in his career, an album-length experiment like Wise Up Ghost seems to satisfy Costello artistically, thanks to his chameleon tendencies, but there isn't much to add to the best of either catalog. Costello is the pop equivalent of a shark: He must keep moving through fresh artistic ground—or doubling back across territory he hasn't touched recently—in order to survive. Though that movement helps Costello maintain a consistent level of output, that process doesn't always leave essential records in his wake." Kitty Empire of The Observer gave the album three out of five stars, saying "Devotees of Elvis Costello will find this collaboration with hip-hop band the Roots a more labour-intensive listen, perhaps, than the casual arriviste. These tracks are densely self-referential, borrowing lyrics and themes from Costello's past. Most politically, there is a sequel, of sorts, to his Falklands-era screed, Shipbuilding, called Cinco Minutos Con Vos, which imagines the view from the south Atlantic. What's new, though, is the Roots's mutating groove and how well it chimes with Costello's delivery, alternately gruff, sour or soulful."

Robert Ham of Paste gave the album an 8.7 out of 10, saying "That this collaboration would end up working so well should really be of little surprise to longtime fans of Costello. His '70s and '80s work often bore the influence of the same R&B, soul and funk records that the Roots clearly adore. But via the Attractions or any of his other backing bands, those forces were often swallowed up beneath a maelstrom of pub-rock antics and Phil Spector-style productions." Will Hermes of Rolling Stone gave the album three and a half stars out of five, saying "Another dubious Elvis Costello genre exercise? Actually, this collab is something sturdier and more interesting: a pained set about decaying culture long on verbose vitriol and (obviously) wicked grooves – think a dyspeptic What's Going On or a soul-powered Armed Forces." Greg Kot of the Chicago Tribune gave the album three out of four stars, saying "In a world in which government surveillance, chemical weapons and citizen revolts are ascendant, Wise Up Ghost provides an appropriately nerve-racking soundtrack with a desperate message: Indifference is death."

Jim Farber of the New York Daily News gave the album four out of four stars, saying Wise Up Ghost contains some of the most fleshy and smart work of either act's career. It's a perfect nexus of talents, reining in Costello's excesses while giving the Roots a new, literary context." Colin McGuire of PopMatters gave the album an eight out of ten, saying "Some people turn their obsessions into careers, the singer argues at one point during "Stick Out Your Tongue". Elvis Costello and the Roots? Well, they already have the careers. With Wise Up Ghost, though, they now also have a great album." Randall Roberts of the Los Angeles Times gave the album a positive review, saying "'Gather some stones and make them atone,' sings Costello on 'Come the Meantimes,' a line that captures the essence of Wise Up Ghost. A heavy work both thematically and musically, it shows one of the great songwriters of the last three-plus decades at yet another artistic peak. If you've ever fallen in love with a Costello record, be prepared for a new obsession." Nick Coleman of The Independent gave the album four out of five stars, saying "There's something artificial and experimental in the project's very DNA, but that need not be a bad thing, and it isn't."

== Commercial performance ==
The album debuted at number 16 on the Billboard 200 chart, with first-week sales of 18,000 copies in the United States. In its second week the album sold 6,000 more copies bringing its total album sales to 25,000.

== Track listing ==
All tracks are written by Elvis Costello, Ahmir Thompson and Steven Mandel, unless otherwise indicated.

| No. | Title | Writer(s) | Length |
|---|---|---|---|
| 1. | "Walk Us Uptown" | | 3:22 |
| 2. | "Sugar Won't Work" (Contains a sample of Costello's "You Left Me in The Dark") | | 3:31 |
| 3. | "Refuse to Be Saved" | | 4:23 |
| 4. | "Wake Me Up" | | 5:52 |
| 5. | "Tripwire" | | 4:28 |
| 6. | "Stick Out Your Tongue" | | 5:28 |
| 7. | "Come the Meantimes" (Contains excerpts From "I Don't See Me in Your Eyes Anymore" by Glass House) | Costello; Thompson; Mandel; Ronald Dunbar; Daphne Ann Dozier; Edythe Vernelle Craighead | 3:53 |
| 8. | "(She Might Be A) Grenade" | | 4:36 |
| 9. | "Cinco Minutos Con Vos" (Contains A sample from Costello's "Impatience") | | 5:01 |
| 10. | "Viceroy's Row" | | 5:01 |
| 11. | "Wise Up Ghost" (Contains A sample from Costello's "Can You Be True") | | 6:27 |
| 12. | "If I Could Believe" | Costello | 3:58 |
| Total length: | | | 55:54 |

Deluxe CD bonus tracks
| No. | Title | Length |
|---|---|---|
| 13. | "My New Haunt" | 4:39 |
| 14. | "Can You Hear Me?" | 6:27 |
| 15. | "The Puppet Has Cut His Strings" | 4:57 |

== Personnel ==
=== Musicians ===
- Elvis Costello – Ampeg Baby Bass, composer, baritone guitar, distortion guitar, rhythm guitar, horn arrangements, melodica, organ, piano, producer, vocals, Wah Wah guitar, Wurlitzer piano
- Questlove – drums, producer, composer
- Ray Angry – bells, clavinet, Farfisa organ, keyboards, organ, piano
- James Poyser – keyboards, piano
- Kirk Douglas – guitar, acoustic guitar, electric guitar, rhythm guitar, vocals
- Mark Kelley – bass
- Matt Cappy – flugelhorn, horn arrangements, trumpet
- Frank "Knuckles" Walker – bells, chimes, percussion, tambourine
- Korey Riker – horn arrangements, baritone saxophone, tenor saxophone, saxophone
- Marisol "La Marisoul" Hernandez – featured artist, translation, vocals
- Robert Berg – viola
- Sally Berman – violin
- Diane Birch – backing vocals
- Damon Bryson – sousaphone
- Alex Budman – bass clarinet
- Mark Cargill – violin
- Bob Carr – bassoon, contrabassoon
- Drew Dembowski – bass
- Chris Farr – flute, horn arrangements, saxophone
- Mike Ferrill – violin
- Roland Kato – viola
- Anna Kostyuchek – violin
- The Brent Fischer Orchestra – featured artist on tracks 2, 3, 8, 9 and 12
- Sam Fischer – violin
- Steve Hughes – euphonium
- Alex Gorlovsky – violin
- Miguel Martinez – cello
- Pino Palladino – bass
- Kazi Pitelka – viola
- Kevan Torfeh – cello
- Cecilia Tsan – cello
- Ken Wild – bass
- Elizabeth Wilson – violin
- Bill Reichenbach – contrabass trombone, euphonium, tuba

=== Production ===
- Ahmir Thompson – composer, producer
- Steven Mandel – engineer, horn arrangements, mixing, producer, composer
- Mike Cashin – assistant engineer
- Brendan Steele – assistant engineer
- Brent Fischer – conductor, orchestration
- Danny Clinch – photography
- Assa Drori – concert master, contractor
- Eric Eylands – production assistant
- Nicole Frantz – creative director
- Keith Horn – production assistant
- Guadalupe Jolicoeur – translation
- Sebastián Krys – vocal engineer
- Dave Kutch – mastering
- Colin Nairne – session coordinator
- Frank Rodriguez – production assistant
- Felix Romero – production assistant
- Claris Sayadian-Dodge – production assistant
- Coco Shinomiya – art direction
- Richard Stolz – vocal engineer
- Ben Greenman – liner notes

== Charts ==
| Chart (2013) | Peak position |
|---|---|
| Australian Albums (ARIA) | 40 |
| Austrian Albums (Ö3 Austria) | 48 |
| Belgian Albums (Ultratop Flanders) | 31 |
| Belgian Albums (Ultratop Wallonia) | 129 |
| Danish Albums (Hitlisten) | 31 |
| Dutch Albums (Album Top 100) | 35 |
| French Albums (SNEP) | 131 |
| German Albums (Offizielle Top 100) | 29 |
| Irish Albums (IRMA) | 30 |
| Italian Albums (FIMI) | 68 |
| Norwegian Albums (VG-lista) | 26 |
| Spanish Albums (Promusicae) | 66 |
| Swiss Albums (Schweizer Hitparade) | 12 |
| UK Albums (Official Charts) | 28 |
| US Billboard 200 | 16 |
