= How I Got Over (album) =

Studio album by the Roots
- Released: June 22, 2010
- Recorded: A House Called Quest, Fruity Loops, The Boom Room, The Studio; Philadelphia; MSR Studios, New York City
- Genre: Hip-hop
- Length: 42:25
- Label: Def Jam
- Producer: The Roots; Ahmir Thompson; Alectrick.Kom; Jeremy Grenhart; Karl Jenkins; Pedro Martinez; Ray Angry; Richard Nichols (also exec.); Rick Friedrich; Thomas Pentz

The Roots chronology
Rising Down (2008)	How I Got Over (2010)	Wake Up! (2010)

Singles from How I Got Over
- 1. "How I Got Over" Released: June 25, 2009; 2. "Dear God 2.0" Released: May 22, 2010; 3. "The Fire" Released: June 1, 2010

How I Got Over is the ninth studio album by American hip-hop band the Roots. It was released on June 22, 2010, by Def Jam Recordings.

Produced primarily by band members Black Thought, Questlove, Dice Raw, and Rick Friedrich, How I Got Over features a subtle, somber sound and lyrics concerning themes of self-determination, existentialism, and African-American middle-class angst. Although primarily a hip-hop album, its music also draws on indie rock, soul, funk, gospel, and neo soul styles.

The album debuted at number six on the US Billboard 200 chart, selling 51,000 copies in its first week. It was also met with widespread critical acclaim and named by several publications as one of the best albums from 2010. Music critic Robert Christgau later called How I Got Over the Roots' "most substantial" album and the best of the 2010s.

== Recording and production ==
In 2008, the Roots stated that their final album would be Rising Down (2008), until drummer and producer for the Roots, Questlove, stated via his Twitter account that the band would release an album called How I Got Over in the summer. How I Got Over was recorded during the Roots' tenure as the house band for Late Night with Jimmy Fallon. It was recorded in sessions at several Philadelphia studios—A House Called Quest, Fruity Loops, The Boom Room, and The Studio—and at MSR Studios in New York City.

On June 23, 2009, Billboard reported: "Among the tracks expected to make the cut are 'Walk Alone,' the vintage R&B-leaning 'Make a Move,' 'The Day' featuring Icelandic vocalist Patty Crash and a cover of Frank Zappa's instrumental classic 'Peaches en Regalia.' 'How I Got Over' is also expected to include a version of Cody Chesnutt's 'Serve This Royalty;' the singer-songwriter rose to fame in 2002 when the Roots re-recorded his song 'The Seed' for their album 'Phrenology'". From the tracks initially expected to make the album, only 'The Day', 'Walk Alone' and the title song 'How I Got Over' made the final track listing. Similar to the previous The Roots full-length, 2008's Rising Down, the album features a wide array of guest singers and rappers. John Legend appears on the single 'The Fire' and alternative rock group Monsters of Folk help The Roots remake their own song, 'Dear God' into an updated '...2.0' version which was released as the most promoted single. The album also feature a track that samples Joanna Newsom's "Book of Right-On," a track featured on her 2004 release The Milk-Eyed Mender, as well as new overdubs for the track, The Roots' version appears under the title 'Right On' here.

== Release and sales ==
The album was set to be released in February 2010, but was subsequently pushed back to June 8, 2010. Their ninth album, it was released June 22, 2010 on Def Jam Recordings.

The album debuted at number six on the US Billboard 200 chart with first-week sales of 51,000 copies. It also entered at number three on Billboard's R&B/Hip-Hop Albums and Rap Albums charts, and at number four on the Digital Albums chart. In Canada, the album entered at number 14 on the Top 100 Albums chart. It also charted at number three in Switzerland, at number 117 in France, at number 61 in the Netherlands, and at number 35 in New Zealand.

In its second week on the Billboard 200, How I Got Over dropped to number 17 and sold 21,000 copies. It fell to number 25 on the chart and sold 14,000 copies in its third week. By November 3, 2010, the album had sold 151,000 copies in the US.

== Critical reception ==
Professional ratings
Aggregate scores
Source	Rating
AnyDecentMusic?	7.6/10
Metacritic	86/100
Review scores
Source	Rating
AllMusic	4/5 stars
The A.V. Club	A−
Chicago Tribune	3.5/4 stars
Entertainment Weekly	A−
The Guardian	4/5 stars
MSN Music (Expert Witness)	A
Pitchfork	8.1/10
Rolling Stone	3.5/5 stars
Spin	8/10
USA Today	4/4 stars

How I Got Over was met with widespread critical acclaim. At Metacritic, which assigns a normalized rating out of 100 to reviews from professional publications, the album received an average score of 86, based on 23 reviews. According to the website, it was the 15th-best reviewed album of 2010.

Reviewers praised How I Got Over for its slow-grooving music, the contributions of its guest artists, and the substance of its lyrics. AllMusic's Andy Kellman described the album as "deeply planted in realism ... gracefully and cleverly sequenced", while Rolling Stone critic Nathan Brackett highlighted The Roots' incorporation of indie rock elements into an "in the pocket" sound. Pitchfork's Nate Patrin deemed How I Got Over "a particularly efficient album ... the Roots' shortest (a lean 42 and a half minutes), one of their most lyrically straightforward, and a work of strong stylistic cohesion". In The New York Times, Jon Pareles appraised the record as a meditative work about self-determination that he believed was particularly relevant to the economic downturn of the late 2000s. "Even in its boasts, How I Got Over is selfless: an album of doubts, parables and pep talks", Pareles wrote.

James Shahan from URB found it "dark and tragic in places, but also enlightening and empowering", and Spin journalist Charles Aaron said "you'd have to rewind early-'90s Scarface or Wu-Tang for such convincingly cold-eyed hip-hop existentialism". Writing for MSN Music, Robert Christgau was impressed by how the rappers on the album had expressed "garden-variety upper-middle-class anxiety" in a forthright, thoughtful, articulate, and enjoyable manner, while musical elements such as Kamal Gray's keyboards and Questlove's drums "embodied" the "fortitude and even optimism" of the lyrics. Eric Henderson was less enthusiastic in Slant Magazine, finding the lyrics inconsistent and "mildly self-delusional" while calling the album "stylistically the most inert, contemplative, offputtingly soft music they've possibly ever released".

Critics also included the album in their top-10 records lists for 2010; it was ranked at number seven by Vibe, number five by both The A.V. Club and Todd Martens from the Los Angeles Times, number 10 by both Consequence of Sound and Jim DeRogatis, and number three by BBC Music. Christgau named How I Got Over the year's best album and wrote in The Barnes & Noble Review, "in 2010 what sounded best was the Roots' brave and sometimes painful change-of-life hip-hop, a multivalent reflection on the pop lifer's danger years, the late thirties." He later called it the "most substantial" album of the Roots' career and the best album of the 2010s. How I Got Over was also nominated for a 2011 Grammy Award in the category of Best Rap Album, but lost to Eminem's Recovery.

== Track listing ==
Continuation from Rising Down

The track listing was confirmed by Okayplayer.

No.	Title	Writer(s)	Producer(s)	Length
143.	"A Peace of Light" (featuring Amber Coffman, Angel Deradoorian & Haley Dekle)	Ahmir Thompson; Ray Angry	Ahmir Thompson; Ray Angry	1:50
144.	"Walk Alone" (featuring Truck North, P.O.R.N. & Dice Raw)	Tariq Trotter; Jamal Miller; Greg Spearman; Karl Jenkins; Jeremy Grenhart; Rick Friedrich	Ahmir Thompson; Jeremy Grenhart; Karl Jenkins; Richard Nichols	3:55
145.	"Dear God 2.0" (featuring Monsters of Folk)	Trotter; Thompson; Pedro Martinez; Nichols; Jim James	Ahmir Thompson; Richard Nichols; Pedro Martinez	3:52
146.	"Radio Daze" (featuring Blu, P.O.R.N. & Dice Raw)	Trotter; Johnson Barnes; Spearman; Jenkins; Grenhart; Friedrich	Ahmir Thompson; Jeremy Grenhart; Karl Jenkins	4:16
147.	"Now or Never" (featuring Phonte & Dice Raw)	Trotter; Phonte Coleman; Grenhart; Jenkins	Ahmir Thompson; Jeremy Grenhart; Karl Jenkins	4:34
148.	"How I Got Over" (featuring Dice Raw)	Trotter; Jenkins; Grenhart; Friedrich	Ahmir Thompson; Jeremy Grenhart; Karl Jenkins; Richard Nichols; Rick Friedrich	3:36
149.	"DillaTUDE: The Flight of Titus"	Thompson; Angry	Ahmir Thompson; Ray Angry	0:42
150.	"The Day" (featuring Blu, Phonte & Patty Crash)	Trotter; Thompson; Coleman; Barnes; Jenkins; Katrin Newman; James Poyser; Kirk Douglas; James Gray; Owen Biddle; Franklin Walker; Damon Bryson	The Roots; Richard Nichols	3:44
151.	"Right On" (featuring Joanna Newsom & STS)	Trotter; Thompson; Don Carlos Price; Newsom; Delon Lawrence; Amanda Goad	Ahmir Thompson; Alectrick.Kom	3:36
152.	"Doin' It Again"	Trotter; Thompson; John Stephens	Ahmir Thompson	2:24
153.	"The Fire" (featuring John Legend)	Trotter; Thompson; Friedrich; Jenkins	Ahmir Thompson; Karl Jenkins; Richard Nichols; Rick Friedrich	3:41
154.	"Tunnel Vision"	Thompson; Angry	Ahmir Thompson; Ray Angry	0:40
155.	"Web 20/20" (featuring Peedi Peedi & Truck North)	Trotter; Thompson; Pedro Zayas; Miller	Ahmir Thompson	2:46
156.	"Hustla" (featuring STS) (bonus track)	Trotter; Thompson; Price; Thomas Pentz	Ahmir Thompson; Thomas Pentz	2:56

== Personnel ==
Credits for How I Got Over adapted from liner notes.

- Executive producer: Richard Nichols
- A&R: Lenny S., Karl Jenkins
- A&R operations: Leesa D. Brunson
- A&R administration: Mark Tavern
- Mastered by: Dave Kutch
- Marketing: Chris Atlas, Paul Resta
- Management: Shawn Gee, Richard Nichols
- Business management: Shawn Gee, SEFG LLC
- Creative management: Richard Nichols, CoolHunter LLC
- Art direction: Richard Nichols, Kenny Gravillis, Todd Russell
- Design: Gravillis, Inc.
- Art, photography coordination: Kristen Yiengst, Tai Linzie
- The Roots photography: Ben Watts
- Styling: Rebecca Pietri, www.hommepourfemme.com
- Gromming: Fahim
- Legal counsel: Brad A. Rubens
- Business affairs: Randy McMillan, Antoinette Trotman, Ian Allen
- Sample clearances: Deborah Mannis-Gardner for DMG Clearances, Inc.
- Engineer: Josh Burnette

== Charts ==
=== Weekly charts ===
Chart (2010)	Peak position
Australian Albums (ARIA)	71
Belgian Albums (Ultratop Flanders)	86
Canadian Albums (Billboard)	14
Dutch Albums (Album Top 100)	33
French Albums (SNEP)	117
German Albums (Offizielle Top 100)	70
Greek Albums (IFPI)	38
New Zealand Albums (RMNZ)	35
Swiss Albums (Schweizer Hitparade)	3
US Billboard 200	6
US Top R&B/Hip-Hop Albums (Billboard)	3
US Top Rap Albums (Billboard)	3

=== Year-end charts ===
Chart (2010)	Position
US Top R&B/Hip-Hop Albums (Billboard)	50
