= Hub (bassist) =

American musician (1959–2021)

Leonard Nelson "Hub" Hubbard (February 12, 1959 – December 16, 2021) was an American musician best known as the electric bass guitarist for The Roots, a Philadelphia band, from 1994 to 2007. He played on all of their records until his departure from the group, including 1999's Things Fall Apart and 2004's The Tipping Point.

== Biography ==
Hubbard, who was of African American heritage, was born on February 12, 1959. He was known for always having a chew stick in his mouth, on and off the stage. He studied at Settlement Music School during his youth in Philadelphia, and then studied classical upright bass at Carnegie Mellon University in Pittsburgh, Pennsylvania.

He played his last show with The Roots on June 7, 2008, at the first annual Roots Picnic.

=== Illness and death ===
A resident of West Philadelphia, Hubbard was diagnosed with multiple myeloma in 2007. He died from the disease at Lankenau Medical Center in Lower Merion Township, Pennsylvania, on December 16, 2021, at the age of 62. He was interred at Laurel Hill Cemetery in Philadelphia.
