= Rising Down =

Studio album by the Roots
- Released: April 28, 2008
- Recorded: 2006–2007
- Genres: Hip-hop; hardcore hip-hop
- Length: 47:14
- Label: Def Jam
- Producers: L.A. Reid (exec.); Richard Nichols (also exec.); the Roots; Black Thought; James Poyser; Khari Mateen; Pedro Martinez; Questlove; Radji Mateen; Ritz Reynolds; Shane Clark; Tahir Jamal

The Roots chronology
Game Theory (2006)	Rising Down (2008)	How I Got Over (2010)

Rising Down is the eighth studio album by the American hip-hop band the Roots, released on April 28, 2008, on Def Jam Recordings. The album's title is adapted from William T. Vollmann's book Rising Up and Rising Down: Some Thoughts on Violence, Freedom and Urgent Means (2004). Expanding on the dark, dense production and political tone of Game Theory (2006), Rising Down features lyrical themes concerning issues of contemporary society, including violence, poverty, social and environmental climate, drugs, police corruption and the music industry.

The album debuted at number six on the US Billboard 200 chart, selling 54,000 copies in its first week. It charted modestly in other countries and achieved moderate sales success. On release, Rising Down received generally positive reviews from most music critics. The music critic Robert Christgau named it the ninth best album of 2008. The album has sold 171,000 copies in the United States.

== Music and lyrics ==
According to the band's producer, Questlove, Rising Down "is an electric record, more synthy. The darks are darker and the lights are lighter. But all I know is making quality hip-hop stylistically. We tried to do something we never did before. Kamal had to be the sacrificial lamb this time. The one instrument that has defined the Roots has been the Fender Rhodes. This is the first year he's had to change his instrumentation and try other sounds out. We have a bunch of keyboards and synthesizers we're using on this record. It feels like the musical equivalent of 'Blade Runner' sometimes. We've also added a horn section."

The album's themes are dark, as on the preceding Game Theory, with Questlove referring to this album as "the most incendiary, political album of our career to date". In the same interview, he explained, "Add up the crime and high school drop-out rates in Philadelphia, plus being in your mid-30s and working 300 nights a year and this being an election year — yeah, all that’s what this album’s about." The album's title comes from William T. Vollmann's 2004 book Rising Up and Rising Down: Some Thoughts on Violence, Freedom and Urgent Means. Similar to the book, the role of violence in human society is a central theme on the overtly political album; its political message reflects the violence in The Roots' home city of Philadelphia.

The album contains a large number of guest vocalists, particularly in comparison to previous Roots albums. It has many of the same guest vocalists as Game Theory. Peedi Crakk, Malik B., Dice Raw, P.O.R.N. and Mercedes Martinez make repeat appearances. The DC rapper Wale appears on the album, following an invitation stemming from a Black Thought-tribute track called "Work" on his 100 Miles & Running mixtape. Other notable featured artists on the album include the Soulquarians members Mos Def, Talib Kweli and Common, as well as Styles P and Saigon.

== Release and promotion ==
The first track leaked from the album, "75 Bars (Black's Reconstruction)", was posted on Okayplayer on 22 February 2008. The first single was initially confirmed as "Birthday Girl", which features Fall Out Boy's Patrick Stump, and which was leaked on YouTube, a song described by Questlove as "an easy pop song". However, the song went from single to being an iTunes exclusive (bonus track), because it did not fit with the album's motif. "It was just sticking out like a sore thumb...Then we were going to have a 'halftime' thing where it was gonna come in the middle of the record as a break from the political thing, but that didn't work, either. Then we tried to make it the last song on the record, and that wasn't working. Then we tried to make it the hidden track, and that wasn't effective. Basically the album was complete; it starts with 'Rising Down' and it ends with 'Rising Up,' so that makes more sense to me." "Birthday Girl" has been included as a bonus track on iTunes and some international versions of the album, along with "The Grand Return".

Rising Down was first released on April 28, 2008, in the United Kingdom and the next day in the United States, by Def Jam Recordings. In the US, the album debuted at number six on the US Billboard 200 chart and became the highest-selling hip-hop album of its debut week, with first-week sales of 54,000 copies. It spent five weeks on the Billboard 200. The album also entered at number one on Billboard's Top Rap Albums, ultimately spending 12 weeks on the chart, and at number three on Top R&B/Hip-Hop Albums, ultimately spending 22 weeks on the chart, Elsewhere, the album peaked at number 95 in France, at number 34 in Norway, at number 10 in Switzerland and at number 14 in Canada. By October 2009, Rising Down has sold 171,000 copies in the United States.

== Critical reception ==
Professional ratings
Aggregate scores
Source	Rating
Metacritic	80/100
Review scores
Source	Rating
AllMusic	4/5 stars
Blender	4/5 stars
Entertainment Weekly	B−
Los Angeles Times	3/4 stars
Mojo	4/5 stars
MSN Music (Consumer Guide)	A
Pitchfork	7.8/10
Rolling Stone	3.5/5 stars
Slant Magazine	4/5 stars
Spin	8/10

Rising Down was met with generally positive reviews. At Metacritic, which assigns a normalized rating out of 100 to reviews from professional critics, the album received an average score of 80, based on 27 reviews. AllMusic writer Marisa Brown gave it 4 out of 5 stars and wrote that it "acts as a powerful statement on contemporary society". Blender's Hsu Hua commended its concise production and called it "an excellent, punchy album full of youthful swagger and anything-goes experimentation". Tom Horan of The Daily Telegraph cited Rising Down as "the best album of their long career". Chicago Tribune writer Greg Kot lauded the album's socially conscious themes and viewed its sound as "bleaker, grimier and harder-edged" than The Roots' earlier work. Will Dukes of Spin complimented its socially relevant themes and called the album "a thematically, unified, musically propulsive statement about the decline of contemporary society". Rolling Stone's Jody Rosen complimented its dark, dense production, stating "It's a sound that fits the dark subject matter". Tyler Munro of Sputnikmusic stated "Dark, dense and paranoid, Rising Down is surprisingly better for it".

By contrast, Entertainment Weekly's Sean Howe expressed a mixed response towards its "bad vibes" and lyrical "gripes", calling it "a socially conscious creation overseasoned with discontent". Harry Allen of The Village Voice perceived its dense production as overwhelming Black Thought's rapping and questioned, "is zealous love for the track submerging the band's vocalist?", but commended "the nuances of the Roots' dystopia; the rather painterly way they use sound, in the compositional modes that hip-hop affords, to render a world not only under duress, but, in fact, permanently diseased: Dhalgren on wax". Los Angeles Times writer Oliver Wang viewed that it "doesn't replicate the balanced charm" of Game Theory, but ultimately commended its "musical uniformity" and called it "the more provocative effort". PopMatters writer Zeth Lundy wrote that it "does prove to be an provocative peer of cultural riot-acting and pragmatic contextualization--though, as contemporary pop music, it provides a much more immediate delivery of social ethics from a street-level perspective". Nate Patrin of Pitchfork commended Black Thought's rapping and the album's articulation of lyrical themes concerning contemporary society's issues, stating:

If you've been paying any damn attention to the world around you, most of Rising Down's messages ring familiar, and frequently true: This is an album that tells you the entertainment industry is turning into a coon show, the climate (both environmental and cultural) is getting fucked up, and broke people are still struggling. But this record states these ideas with respect to the notion that you know them already, and puts all the revelation and subtext into its unyielding sound. You could call it preaching to the converted, but it also feels like a reminder to the lapsed, less a wake-up call than a shot of renewed adrenaline.

Nate Chinen of The New York Times complimented the album's socially relevant themes and "crisp musicianship", stating "Spiked with dire intensity and stocked with head-spinning rhymes by Black Thought and nearly a dozen guest rappers [...] it’s the most potent Roots release since the one-two punch of 'Things Fall Apart' and its predecessor, 'Illadelph Halflife'". Vibe's Keith Murphy commended The Roots' musical ambition and production on the album. USA Today's Steve Jones gave the album four out of four stars and described its sound as "industrial-strength funk that demands to be turned up loud". Slant Magazine's Dave Hughes called it "the most urgently malevolent modern funk record the band has assembled to date". Nathan Rabin of The A.V. Club gave it a B+ rating and praised "the electric chemistry between Black Thought's unrelenting lyrical assault and ?uestlove's epic drums". The Washington Post's Sarah Godfrey viewed that the album's ominous sound "tempers heady subject matter with much-needed thump" and cited it as The Roots' best work since Things Fall Apart. In his consumer guide for MSN Music, critic Robert Christgau gave Rising Down an A rating and called it "as pleasurable as prime OutKast or Kanye West", while citing it as "the most accomplished pure hip-hop album in years". Christgau ranked Rising Down number nine on his list of 2008's best albums. The Boston Globe's Sarah Rodman named it the third best album of 2008.

== Track listing ==
Track numbers continued from Game Theory.

Credits adapted from the album's liner notes.

No.	Title	Writer(s)	Producer(s)	Length
128.	"The Pow Wow"	Joe Simmons; Richard Nichols; Tariq Trotter; Ahmir Thompson		1:15
129.	"Rising Down" (featuring Mos Def, Styles P & Dice Raw)	Trotter; Karl Jenkins; Thompson; Dante Smith; David Styles; Mark Farner	Questlove	3:40
130.	"Get Busy" (featuring Dice Raw, Peedi Peedi & DJ Jazzy Jeff)	Brent Reynolds; Jenkins; Pedro Zayas; Trotter; Charlie Patierno; Barney McKenna; Vincent Davis; Joel Roper; Chuck Rio	The Roots; Ritz Reynolds	3:29
131.	"@15"	Trotter	Black Thought	0:51
132.	"75 Bars (Black's Reconstruction)"	Trotter; Thompson	Questlove	3:15
133.	"Becoming Unwritten"	Trotter; Jenkins; Thompson; Tahir Jamal; Radji Mateen; Khari Mateen; Radhwan Mateen	The Roots; Tahir Jamal; Radji Mateen; Khari Mateen	0:36
134.	"Criminal" (featuring Truck North, Saigon & Kevin Hanson)	Trotter; K. Mateen; Jenkins; Jamal Miller; Brian Carenard	The Roots; Khari Mateen	4:08
135.	"I Will Not Apologize" (featuring P.O.R.N., Dice Raw & Talib Kweli)	Trotter; Jenkins; Greg Spearman; Nichols; Fela Kuti	The Roots; Richard Nichols	4:34
136.	"I Can't Help It" (featuring Malik B, P.O.R.N., Dice Raw & Mercedes Martinez)	Trotter; Jenkins; Malik Smart; Spearman; Nichols; Thompson; Pedro Martinez	The Roots; Richard Nichols	4:39
137.	"Singing Man" (featuring P.O.R.N., Truck North & Dice Raw)	Trotter; Jenkins; Miller; Spearman; K. Mateen; Thompson	The Roots; Khari Mateen	4:07
138.	"Unwritten" (featuring Mercedes Martinez)	Trotter; Jenkins; Thompson; Jamal; R. Mateen; K. Mateen; R. Mateen	The Roots; Tahir Jamal; Radji Mateen; Khari Mateen	1:22
139.	"Lost Desire" (featuring Malik B & Talib Kweli)	Trotter; Smart; Talib Kweli Greene; Jenkins; K. Mateen	The Roots; Khari Mateen	3:58
140.	"The Show" (featuring Common & Dice Raw)	Trotter; Lonnie Lynn Jr.; Jamal; Thompson; Jenkins	The Roots; Tahir Jamal	3:44
141.	"Rising Up" (featuring Wale & Chrisette Michele)	Trotter; Olubowale Folarin; Jenkins	Questlove; James Poyser	4:23

Bonus track
No.	Title	Producer(s)	Length
142.	"Birthday Girl" (featuring Patrick Stump, Shane Clark, Kelli Scarr & Mercedes Martinez)	Questlove; Shane Clark; Richard Nichols	4:03
143.	"The Grand Return" (featuring Dice Raw & Wadud Ahmad) / "Pow Wow 2" (hidden track)	The Roots; Pedro Martinez	5:17
Total length:			53:58

Sample credits

- "Rising Down" contains an interpolation from "Nothing Is the Same", written by Mark Farner.
- "Get Busy" contains excerpts from the "Pee Wee Dance", written by Vincent Davis, Joel Roper, and Chuck Rio, as performed by Joeski Love.
- "I Will Not Apologize" contains excerpts from "Mr. Grammarticalogylisationalism Is The Boss", written and performed by Fela Kuti.

== Personnel ==
Credits for Rising Down adapted from Allmusic.

- A.J. Benson – A&R
- Jay Brown – A&R
- Jan Fairchild – vocal engineer
- Jason Goldstein – engineer, mixing
- Kenny J. Gravillis – art direction
- Kevin Hanson – choir, chorus
- Tahir Jamal – producer
- Karl Jenkins – A&R
- Anthony Kilhoffer – engineer
- David Kutch – mastering
- Talib Kweli – vocals, choir, chorus
- Malik B. – vocals
- Steve Mandel – engineer, mixing, drum recordings
- Deborah Mannis-Gardner – sample clearance
- Mel Marcelo – cover illustration
- Mercedes Martinez – choir, chorus
- Khari Mateen – producer, engineer
- Radji Mateen – producer
- Richard Nichols – producer, executive producer, art direction
- James Poyser – producer
- Montez Roberts – engineer
- Todd Russell – art direction, art coordinator, photo coordination
- Lenny Santiago – A&R
- Jon Smeltz – engineer
- John Stahl – engineer
- Tim Sturges – assistant engineer, mixing assistant
- Ahmir Khalib Thompson – drums, choir, chorus, producer, mixing

== Charts ==
=== Weekly charts ===
Chart (2008)	Peak position
Australian Albums (ARIA)	100
Canadian Albums (Billboard)	14
French Albums (SNEP)	95
Norwegian Albums (VG-lista)	34
Swiss Albums (Schweizer Hitparade)	10
US Billboard 200	6
US Top R&B/Hip-Hop Albums (Billboard)	3
US Top Rap Albums (Billboard)	1

=== Year-end charts ===
Chart (2008)	Position
US Top R&B/Hip-Hop Albums (Billboard)	88
