= Captain Kirk Douglas =

American guitarist and singer (born 1973)

- Douglas in 2026

Background information
- Born: Kirk Douglas; September 30, 1973 (age 53)
- Origin: Long Island, New York
- Genres: Hip hop; neo soul; soul; funk; R&B; alternative rock; pop
- Occupations: Musician; songwriter
- Instruments: Guitar; ukulele; vocals
- Years active: 1993–present
- Member of: The Roots; The Tonight Show Band; Hundred Watt Heart

"Captain" Kirk Douglas (born September 30, 1973) is an American lead guitarist and singer in the hip hop band The Roots. Douglas plays with the Roots in the house band for The Tonight Show Starring Jimmy Fallon.

== Career ==
"Captain" Kirk Douglas joined the Roots in 2003. His first album with the Roots was 2004's The Tipping Point, where he split guitar duties with Martin Luther and Anthony Tidd. By the release of their 2006 album Game Theory, he had assumed the role as sole guitarist for the band. As a vocalist, he serves as the band's primary melodic singer, sharing duties with American rapper Black Thought.

His band Hundred Watt Heart includes Ricc Sheridan (drums) and Gbatokai Dakina (bass), and has released two albums.

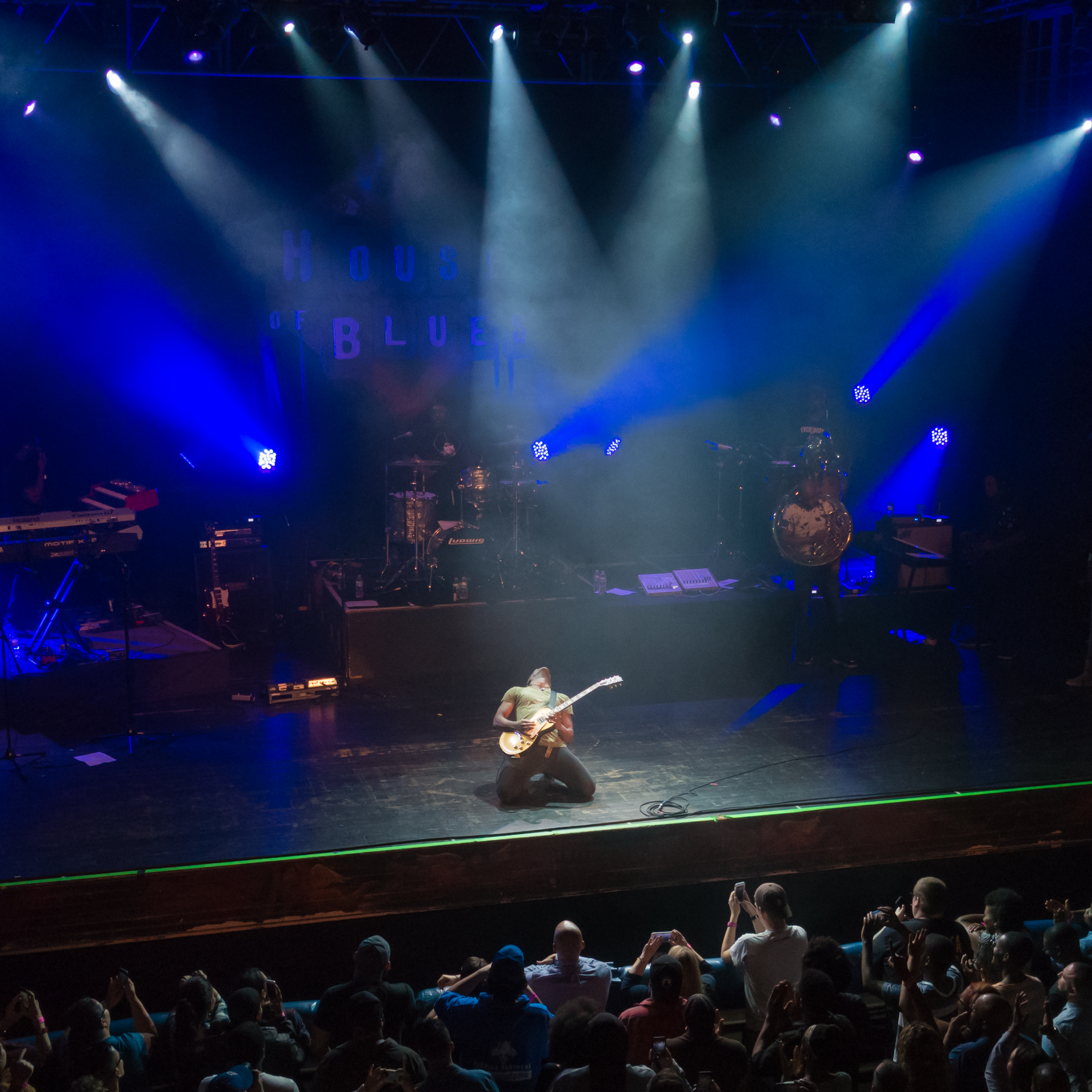
Kirk Douglas with The Roots in Orlando, 2016

== Equipment ==
On The Tonight Show Starring Jimmy Fallon, Douglas mainly uses a Gibson CS-356, a black custom Gibson Les Paul, or a custom Gibson SG. He owns more than fifteen electric guitars, including a Gibson Goldtop (given to him by Vernon Reid), a Gibson Dusk Tiger and his favorite: a '61 Epiphone Crestwood. In 2013, Gibson began producing the "Captain Kirk" Custom SG. He also owns an acoustic Gibson J-200 and a Gibson Hummingbird. In honor of what would have been Roy Orbison's 75th birthday, Douglas played Orbison's signature Gibson ES-335 on Late Night with Jimmy Fallon, April 25, 2011.

The Crestwood had its headstock broken in March 2013 when Prince threw it in the air following his performance of "Bambi" on Late Night with Jimmy Fallon. Prince had admired the guitar (which Douglas had planned to play at a Prince tribute concert) and asked a crew member if he could borrow it for his performance. He asked Douglas if he could buy it from him. Douglas said no but let Prince use it. Douglas said he wasn't expecting Prince to toss it into the air and was aghast when he saw the guitar fall to the ground. After the performance, Prince assured Douglas he would "take care of it." Douglas was soon wired "a sizable amount of money," he later recounted.
