= Space Train =

Space Train may refer to:

- An early open gangway design for the London Underground 2009 Stock
- Space Train, a sketch on Late Night with Jimmy Fallon
- A Series 10 episode of Fireman Sam
- A proposed invention by Canadian engineer, Charles Bombardier
