= List of Late Night with Jimmy Fallon games and sketches =

The following is a list of recurring games, sketches, and other comedy routines from the NBC late-night talk show Late Night with Jimmy Fallon. The sketches feature host Jimmy Fallon, house band The Roots, announcer/sidekick Steve Higgins, the show's writers, celebrity guests, and audience members. Most of the skits below appeared only on Late Night, while some have carried over to The Tonight Show.

== Weekly routines ==
=== Pros and Cons ===
Every Tuesday (formerly Monday) on the show, Jimmy weighed the pros and cons of a topic that's currently in the news, with the pros being the setups and the cons being the punchlines. (e.g. Pro: With Tiger competing, this year's Masters promises to be the most exciting golf tournament ever. Con: That being said, it's still golf.) Special editions of the sketch included: "The reissue of the Rolling Stones' album Exile on Main St.", in which Jimmy was joined via satellite by Mick Jagger, Keith Richards and Charlie Watts; one in which the topic was "The New NFL Season", where Jimmy was joined by Justin Tuck of the New York Giants; and "The NFL Playoffs" with New York Jets placekicker Nick Folk.

=== #latenight Hashtags ===
Nearly every Thursday (formerly Wednesday) on the show, Jimmy reads off viewer comments from a topic for discussion he started the night or the week before on Twitter. Topics have included "#MyParentsAreWeird", "#WhyDontTheyMakeThat", "#BeachFail", and "#MakesMeMad". As Jimmy frequently announces before he reads his favorite comments, each hashtag would usually become a trending topic on Twitter in the United States within a few minutes after its posting.

Jimmy previously created a spin-off named "Late Night Instagrams".

=== Thank You Notes ===
Nearly every Friday on the show, Jimmy writes thank you notes. He claims that Friday is the day he catches up on "personal stuff" like checking his inbox, returning e-mails, and writing his weekly thank you notes. He explains that he is running behind and asks the audience if they would not mind if he took time out of the show to write them, and asks James Poyser to play some accompanying music (a sped-up version of U2's "October"). During the segment, Jimmy often tries to get James to laugh while James tries to maintain a straight face. The notes are sarcastic in tone and involve current events, people in the news, or things that annoy Jimmy (e.g. "Thank you, pony tails, for turning the backs of girls' heads into horses' butts").

The sketch airs on Thursday during the week of Thanksgiving, in deference to the holiday. The sketch aired on Thursday, March 28, 2013, because the show was off for Good Friday that year.

Jimmy also wrote out a special Winter Olympics-themed set of thank you notes during NBC's prime-time Olympic coverage on February 26, 2010 (a Friday); anchor Bob Costas "played" the usual thank you note-writing music (by pretending to play along on a keyboard while a pre-recorded track of the music played in the background). Costas and Jimmy reprised the bit with a Summer Olympics-themed set on August 10, 2012 (also a Friday).

Mayor Michael Bloomberg joined Jimmy behind the desk to write out some thank you notes of his own on Friday, December 13, 2013.

It was announced on January 31, 2011, that Fallon had signed a book deal to publish entries from the series as two books, the first of which, Thank You Notes, was released May 23, 2011. The sequel, Thank You Notes 2, was released on May 22, 2012. The new book also has a limited edition which has a sound chip that plays the "Thank You Notes" theme music (to which Jimmy replies "We don't even need James Poyser any more", then the camera cuts to Poyser looking depressed).

=== Former weekly sketches ===
==== Late Night Superlatives ====
Similar to a high school yearbook, Jimmy shows pictures of NFL players and says what "Most likely to..." awards they received, to promote the players on the teams of that week's episode of NBC Sunday Night Football, which are simply based on what they look like. He also does it for random celebrities (including the cast of the new season of The Bachelorette), as well as NHL and NBA players, whose playoffs also air on NBC. For the final version of the skit on Late Night, NFL players listed the awards for the show's writers, before dousing Jimmy with Gatorade. After the skit, Jimmy then gave away tickets to go see that year's Super Bowl to a lucky audience member.

== TV parodies ==
=== 7th Floor West ===
7th Floor West is a parody of the MTV series The Hills, documenting Jimmy's arrival to Late Night and his initial struggles in the beginning of the show, such as whether to wear a red tie or a blue tie on his premiere episode. Season 1 of the series dealt with Jimmy's passive-aggressive power struggle with A. D. Miles, Late Night's head writer. Future Saturday Night Live cast member Jenny Slate appeared as Jimmy's assistant who betrayed his trust by collaborating with Miles. New installments premiered every Monday during the summer of 2009, and have a storyline focused on continuity, much as The Hills does.

Season two finds Miles, having moved to the costume department in the season one finale, unhappy with his new role and wishing he was back among the writing staff. As revenge, he dresses Jimmy in ridiculous clothes in order to make Jimmy look like an idiot. During the season, Jimmy and Miles both run for the position of fire warden of the floor. In the series finale, Jimmy and Miles decide to end their silly feud and be friends again, Jimmy gives Miles his job in the writing department back, and they appointed fire-safety enthusiast Questlove to be fire warden.

==== Episodes ====
===== Season 1 =====
- "Tie Me Up, Tie Me Down" (aired March 6, 2009)
- "What's Done is Done" (aired March 19, 2009)
- "It's Come to This" (aired April 14, 2009)
- "That is So Not O.K." (aired June 1, 2009)
- "Jimmy, I'm Jenny" (aired June 8, 2009)
- "He's Got A Lot of Nerve" (aired June 15, 2009)
- "I'm So Over This" (aired June 22, 2009)
- "Watch Your Back, Man" (aired July 13, 2009)
- "I Know What You Did" (aired July 20, 2009)
- "OK, Here's The Deal..." (aired July 27, 2009)
- "It's Already Done" (aired August 3, 2009)
- "Not So Fast..." (aired August 10, 2009)

===== Season 2 =====
- "The Past is the Past" (aired June 24, 2010)
- "It Can Only Be One of You" (aired July 27, 2010)
- "It's Time" (aired August 12, 2010)
- "That's A Wrap" (aired September 27, 2010)

=== Real Housewives of Late Night ===
Real Housewives of Late Night is a recurring parody of the various The Real Housewives of... reality shows with five cast members playing the roles of their fictional "wives". The cast includes Late Night host Jimmy Fallon as power-mad Denise, announcer Steve Higgins as gravel-voiced chain smoker Lydia, Roots bassist Owen Biddle as alcoholic Renee, head writer A. D. Miles as uptight Dale (who is usually accompanied by her son Caleb, who is allergic to all food other than a special paste), and 'director' (in reality, writer) Bashir Salahuddin as compulsive eater Yvonne. Each segment continues from the last in an overarching story similar to 7th Floor West. The plot revolves around alliances and over-the-top rivalries between the characters resulting in exaggerated responses by the characters. Today Show's Fourth Hour hosts Kathy Lee Gifford and Hoda Kotb appeared on the set of their show during one episode.

When the show was in Indianapolis for Super Bowl XLVI, the housewives met up with some of the "wives" of the Indianapolis Colts players (actually the players themselves in drag), including Dallas Clark's wife Sherry, Pierre Garçon's wife Noelle, Antoine Bethea's wife Daris, Robert Mathis's wife Shay-Shay, and Dan Orlovsky's wife Marianne. During the episode, Denise inadvertently started a fight with the Colts wives when she mistakenly congratulated the Colts on making the Super Bowl (thinking the game was played at one of the teams' home stadium), and was informed they were actually the league's worst team that season, with their 2-14 record. This caused Denise and Yvonne to quickly resolve their differences and unite against the Colts wives, causing the Late Night wives to win the brawl.

==== Episodes ====
===== Season 1 =====
- "Thick as Thieves" (aired September 14, 2009)
- "Surprise!" (aired October 1, 2009)
- "Let's Get Physical" (aired October 15, 2009)
- "The Renovation" (aired November 5, 2009)
- "Giving Thanks" (aired November 20, 2009)
- "What a Difference 'Today' Makes" (aired December 10, 2009)
- "The Gift" (aired December 23, 2009)
- Bonus footage from the first six episodes aired December 22, 2009

===== Season 2 =====
- "We're Back" (aired February 24, 2011)
- "Glamour Photo Shoot" (aired April 7, 2011)
- "Real Housewives of Late Night in Indianapolis" (aired February 2, 2012)

=== 6-Bee ===
Named after Late Night's location at 30 Rock, Studio 6B, 6-Bee is a parody of the Fox series Glee. After Jimmy goes to an NBC accountant (played by Fred Armisen) to request money for cue cards, he is turned down because the $375 they would cost is too expensive. However, Jimmy discovers that the first place prize money for glee club sectionals (a flyer for which is conveniently posted in the hallway outside Studio 6B across from a row of lockers) is $380, so he decides to gather the Late Night crew – including A. D. Miles, Paula Pell, Bashir Salahuddin, and Abby Elliott from SNL – together to compete. As practice, they sing the Bon Jovi song "Livin' on a Prayer".

Later, Jimmy and the Late Night squad discover that the cast of the NBC show Parks and Recreation (including Amy Poehler, Rashida Jones, Nick Offerman, Aubrey Plaza, and Chris Pratt) will also be competing in sectionals – and Parks & Rec has recruited The Roots to be in their squad. Jimmy is so frustrated by the Roots' defection that he sings the Twisted Sister song "We're Not Gonna Take It" (which, eventually, both squads join in on).

Episode two of 6-Bee won an Emmy in the category "Outstanding Short Form Picture Editing" at the 2010 Primetime Creative Arts Emmys.

==== Episodes ====
- Episode 1 (aired February 1, 2010)
- Episode 2 (aired April 8, 2010)

=== Late ===
Late is a parody of the ABC series Lost. It deals with the twelve survivors of an elevator crash on the day of the very first show of Late Night with Jimmy Fallon. After the crash, the twelve are trapped on a mysterious abandoned floor in the 30 Rock building.

Late character	Played by	Lost analogue
Jimmy Fallon	Jimmy Fallon	Jack
Gorgon Fallon	Jimmy Fallon	?
Future Jimmy	Jimmy Fallon	?
Higgins	Steve Higgins	?
Ron Dempsey	Anthony Jeselnik	Sawyer
Gerard	Gerard Bradford	Locke
Bashir	Bashir Salahuddin	Michael
Chip (with pet goldfish Carlton)	Jahquan Wynder	Walt (with pet dog Vincent)
Arthur	Arthur Meyer	Hurley
Jane	Cody Lindquist	Kate
Eric	Eric Ledgin	?
Miles	A. D. Miles	Ethan / Ben
Carlton the Bathroom Attendant	?	Jacob / Man in Black
Higgins' Father	Questlove	Bernard
?	?	Rose
?	Mick Jagger	Desmond
Arsenio Hall	Arsenio Hall	?

==== Episodes ====
- "Where Are We?" (aired February 12, 2010)
- "Not Alone" (aired March 1, 2010)
- "Who Are You?" (aired March 16, 2010)
- "My Hairiest Adventure" (aired March 30, 2010)
- "Carlton" (aired April 28, 2010)
- "We Can Do This" (aired May 11, 2010)
- "And Here He Is..." (aired May 20, 2010)

=== Suckers ===
On November 8, 2010, Suckers was a musical parody of several vampire shows and movies (the Twilight films, The Vampire Diaries, True Blood, Buffy the Vampire Slayer, Angel, etc.). In the first episode, a new writer at Late Night, Angelique (Kate Simses), discovers that several of the show's writers, including Jimmy, Bashir Salahuddin, and Morgan Murphy, are secretly vampires, and is herself "turned" by Miles.

=== Jersey Floor ===
Jersey Floor is a parody of the MTV series Jersey Shore. It takes place on a floor in the 30 Rock building that, in addition to being a regular office floor, has a social scene filled with hot tubs, tanning, gyms and lots of partying. The floor is accessed by a special elevator that "Jersey-fies" its riders when the "Jersey Floor" button is pressed. It features Jimmy "J-Bro" Fallon, Steve "The Inflation" Higgins, Josh "DJ Josh" Meyers, Abby "Lovebug" Elliott, A. D. "Miles" Miles, Bashir "B-Hole" Salahuddin, and Rachel "Drootchie" Dratch. Episode 2 featured guest stars Tina Fey and Amy Poehler. Episode 3 featured cameos from many members of the Jersey Shore cast, including Snooki, JWoww, Sammi Sweetheart, Deena Nicole, Ronnie, and Vinny, who were de-Jerseyfied (appearing in more conservative clothes and hairstyles) when they went back to the regular floor with their analogues, then decided they didn't like it and went back to the Jersey Floor.

==== Episodes ====
- Episode 1 (aired March 2, 2011)
- Episode 2 (aired May 5, 2011)
- Episode 3 (aired September 21, 2011)

=== Downton Sixbey ===
Downton Sixbey is a parody of the ITV/PBS series Downton Abbey. When the Earl of Downton Sixbey (Jimmy) receives word that the current heir to Downton Sixbey, Carson Daly is missing following a hot-air ballooning accident, a distant nephew (Questlove) receives word that he is to become the new heir. However, in the second episode, Daly appears at Downton Sixbey, alive and well (only to seemingly perish before the third episode, in another hot-air ballooning accident, along with Usher and Shakira).

Downton Sixbey character	Played by	Downton Abbey analogue
The Earl of Downton Sixbey	Jimmy Fallon	Earl of Grantham (Hugh Bonneville)
Lady Nora	Brooke Shields	Lady Cora (Elizabeth McGovern)
Lady Hedith	Fred Armisen	Lady Edith (Laura Carmichael)
Mr. Higgins	Steve Higgins	Mr. Carson (Jim Carter) / Mr. Bates (Brendan Coyle)
Dowager Countess	A. D. Miles	Dowager Countess (Maggie Smith)
Lady Kathryn	Beth Nicely	Lady Mary (Michelle Dockery)
Lady Amber	Scarlet Benchley	Lady Sybil (Jessica Brown Findlay)
Thompson the Cue Card Valet	Gerard Bradford	Thomas Barrow (Rob James-Collier)
O'Flannigan	Miriam Tolan	Sarah O'Brien (Siobhan Finneran)
Mr. Farouk	Diallo Riddle	Kumal Pamuk (Theo James)
The Nephew	Ahmir ?uestlove Thompson	Mr. Matthew Crawley (Dan Stevens)
Lady Whoopi	Whoopi Goldberg	Mrs. Isobel Crawley (Penelope Wilton)
Carson Daly	Carson Daly	Patrick
Lawrence	Bashir Salahuddin	?
Jokeman/Footman	John Haskell	?

==== Episodes ====
- Episode 1 (aired Thursday, April 12, 2012)
- Episode 2 (aired Thursday, May 24, 2012)
- Episode 3, Part I (aired Tuesday, February 5, 2013)
- Episode 3, Part II (aired Wednesday, February 6, 2013)

=== Mister Romney's Neighborhood ===
On October 9, 2012, Jimmy Fallon portrayed Mitt Romney in a parody of Mister Rogers' Neighborhood entitled Mister Romney's Neighborhood. Dion Flynn portrayed Barack Obama also appeared as the mailman in a parody of Mr. McFeely. Meanwhile, he visited the Neighborhood of Make-Believe ("where me and Paul Ryan get most of our facts from") and outed Henrietta Pussycat as a puppet operated by a union worker. This sketch was in response to the real Romney's claim that he will discontinue federal PBS funding if he is elected president.

=== Jimmy's Corner ===
In a parody of children's shows like Mister Rogers' Neighborhood, Blue's Clues, and Elmo's World in 2013, Jimmy puts on a cardigan and hosts a children's program, but everything is a little off.

- The two little Grady girls from The Shining come by to explain a grown-up concept like the sequester or the stock market as well as promising to kill Jimmy
- The Roots stop by and discuss a kid's concept, such as:
  - Sharing – speaking in unison, they tell how they share everything, including bassist Mark Kelley's wife
  - Colors - they sing a song about colors (red for apple, yellow for the sun, and blue for James Poyser's (racquet-) balls)
- Jimmy then shows a word jumble, using the letters "P-E-N-S-I" (the correct answer being an inoffensive word such as "pines" or "spine")
- Dayvon, the Mnemonic Pimp (Dion Flynn) arrives to give the viewers a way to remember things such as:
  - the order of the planets ("Mashandra's Vajayjay Erstwhile Maquisha's Jugs Seximify Uranus Now-one-of-you-bitches-be-holdin'-out-on-me-and-you-know-that-I'mma-git-cha")
  - the notes on the lines of the treble clef ("Equisha Gots Badonkadonk Disease For-those-of-you-that-don't-know-what-I'm-talking-about-it-means-she-got-a-sick-ass-booty")

=== Game of Desks ===
Game of Desks is a parody of Game of Thrones. The premiere, on May 24, 2013, had A. D. Miles overthrowing Jimmy and appointing himself host, and sentencing Jimmy to death by beheading. When the executioner failed by missing the chopping block entirely and Jimmy lived, Seth Meyers was appointed Jimmy's successor (as he already has been in real life).

=== Joking Bad ===
On September 11, 2013, Joking Bad was a parody of the AMC series Breaking Bad. When the Jimmy learns that he has only six months left as host of Late Night, he teams up with low-level street joke dealer Higgins to sell top quality jokes on the black market. However, after head writer Miles becomes suspicious after seeing video of Colin Quinn with one of the illicit jokes, Jimmy turns to black-market joke wholesaler Gus (Dion Flynn) to move his supply.

Bob Odenkirk appeared in a cameo in character as Saul Goodman, while Bryan Cranston and Aaron Paul appeared in cameos ostensibly as themselves.

Joking Bad character	Played by	Breaking Bad analogue
Jimmy Fallon	Jimmy Fallon	Walter White (Bryan Cranston)
Higgins	Steve Higgins	Jesse Pinkman (Aaron Paul)
Miles	A. D. Miles	Hank Schrader (Dean Norris)
Gus	Dion Flynn	Gus Fring (Giancarlo Esposito)
Jay Leno	Jay Leno	Hector Salamanca (Mark Margolis)
Colin Quinn	Colin Quinn	

== Other recurring sketches ==
=== Musical sketches ===
==== Slow Jam the News ====
The show's longest-running musical sketch, Jimmy joins his house band, The Roots, to serenade the audience on a topic of current newsworthy significance in the style of a slow jam. For years, whenever the sketch aired, former NBC Nightly News host Brian Williams (or, as Jimmy calls him, "Brilliams" or "Bri Will" or "Bri Will.I.Ams") joined Jimmy in slow jams. The following have been topics of a Slow Jam:

- A stimulus bill introduced by Speaker of the House Nancy Pelosi
- The AIG bonus payments controversy
- North Korea's nuclear weapons program
- The appointment of a new Supreme Court Justice
- The 2008–2010 California budget crisis
- The 2011 United States federal budget proposed by President Barack Obama
- The 2010 health care bill
- The euro area crisis and the Greek government-debt crisis
- President Obama's address on the Deepwater Horizon oil spill and the need to invest in renewable energy sources
- The debate in Congress about extending the Bush tax cuts
- The protests over Wisconsin Gov. Scott Walker's proposed 2011 state budget bill
- The United States debt-ceiling crisis of 2011
- The Occupy Wall Street movement
- Super PACs (this segment was included on Blow Your Pants Off)
- President Obama's push to stop Congress from doubling interest rates on Stafford Loans. President Obama himself joined Jimmy on this installment instead of Brian Williams, in Jimmy's one-night visit to the University of North Carolina at Chapel Hill on April 24, 2012.
- The January 2013 debt limit standoff
- The October 2013 special election in New Jersey to replace Senator Frank Lautenberg. Jimmy was joined in this installment by New Jersey governor Chris Christie.

==== Rockapella ====
Jimmy and men from the show's staff plus one of the guests from that night's episode will perform the Where in the World is Carmen Sandiego? theme as Rockapella, except they will only sing rhythm and not vocals.

==== The Vanilla Wombats ====
Jimmy is the frontman of a punk band similar to the Ramones called The Vanilla Wombats. Each of the band members dresses in black, with a black cape, dark sunglasses, and a platinum blonde wig. Their songs include "My Upstairs Neighbors Are Having Sex (And Listening To The Black Eyed Peas)" and "I've Finally Accepted The Fact That I Wear Size 36 Jeans".

==== Blow Your Pants Off ====
Blow Your Pants Off, a CD and vinyl LP of the show's greatest hits, was released on June 12, 2012. The album cover shows a bottomless Jimmy lying down on his stomach, but he says a "stunt butt" was used. It won a Grammy Award for Best Comedy Album.

==== Original songs ====
Jimmy has performed original songs such as "I'm Gettin' Drunk on Christmas", "I'm Goin' Huntin' for Cougars", one about the Deepwater Horizon oil spill called "[Tar] Balls in Your Mouth" (which Jimmy later revealed on the October 31, 2011 episode of Conan was his first choice for the name of his Ben & Jerry's ice cream flavor "Late Night Snack"), "The Ballad of Steven Slater", "Gonna Eat That Talkin' Sandwich: The Sarah Palin Song", "The Ballad of Anthony Weiner" (which repeatedly used the term "sucks, Weiner"), and "Walk of Shame" (accompanied by Dave Matthews). While Jimmy is singing, often some people wearing yellow tracksuits and sunglasses (usually including Seth Herzog and Mike Dicenzo, one of them without pants), as well as the Product Placement Preacher start dancing behind him. Jake Gyllenhaal joined in once as one of the Banana Boyz.

In 2010, country singer John Rich joined Jimmy for a duet of "I'm Gettin' Drunk on Christmas" which was later released on iTunes and became one of their most popular Christmas songs of the year.

On September 8, 2011, Eddie Vedder joined Jimmy for a duet of "Balls in Your Mouth".

==== Audience requested songs ====
Jimmy has solicited song titles from the audience, asking them to send him titles of songs for him to sing via Twitter; he picks the one he likes the best (e.g. "Black Thought's Favorite Dinosaurs" and "I Love Your Elbows") and performs a song with that title on the next night's show.

==== Neil Young ====
Jimmy impersonates singer Neil Young and sings a song. To date, he has sung the theme song to The Fresh Prince of Bel-Air, "Pants on the Ground" by "General" Larry Platt, an original song based on the "Double Rainbow" Internet meme, Willow Smith's "Whip My Hair" and LMFAO's "Sexy and I Know It" (duets with Bruce Springsteen), Miley Cyrus's "Party in the U.S.A." (with David Crosby and Graham Nash, in a partial "reunion" of Crosby, Stills, Nash & Young) and Iggy Azalea's "Fancy" (with Crosby, Stills & Nash).

==== Scrambled Eggs ====
When Paul McCartney was a guest on the show, he confirmed that the working title of The Beatles song "Yesterday" was in fact "Scrambled Eggs". He and Jimmy went on to do a duet of the never-before-heard "original version", which was instead about their favorite food items.

==== The Miner 69ers Boy Band ====
Jimmy, Higgins, Tariq and Seth Herzog appeared as a boy band called The Miner 69ers, whose members were some of the rescued Chilean miners, and performed a song called "There's Nothing Finer Than Sex With a Miner".

==== Captain Kirk's Ballads ====
On little celebrated holidays such as Election Day and Groundhog Day, The Roots' Captain Kirk Douglas performs a sex ballad called "I'm Gonna Make Sweet, Sweet Love to You Woman on (holiday here)", filled with double entendres and sexual innuendos.

==== Bob Dylan ====
Jimmy performed the Charles in Charge theme song as Bob Dylan. In 2018, Jimmy performed "The Times They Are a-Changin'" with updated lyrics on a live post-Super Bowl episode. Both segments were shown in black and white as a parody of I'm Not There.

==== Ladysmith Snack Mambazo ====
After a cloud of smoke obscures the camera, Jimmy, the Roots, and some of the show's African-American writers (including Bashir Salahuddin) don dashikis and sing about snack foods (such as Hot Pockets or Ben & Jerry's) in the style of African choral group Ladysmith Black Mambazo. They once sang about Six Flags amusement parks as "Ladysmith Theme Park Mombazo".

The Ben & Jerry's version of the sketch began the show's relationship with that company, which ultimately led to the release of the show's official flavor, "Late Night Snack".

==== Pearl Jam ====
Jimmy as Eddie Vedder performed a parody of the Pearl Jam song "Jeremy" about basketball phenom Jeremy Lin of the New York Knicks.

==== Tebowie ====
Jimmy dresses in an amalgam of Ziggy Stardust-era David Bowie's costume, the face makeup from the cover of the Bowie album Aladdin Sane, and NFL quarterback Tim Tebow's uniform and sings a song about events in Tebow's life to the tune of a Bowie song.

- a song about an imagined conversation between Tebow and Jesus Christ in which Tebow asks for help in their upcoming playoff game against the New England Patriots (to the tune of "Space Oddity"). Jesus rejects Tebow's request and tells him to stop calling him.
- a song about Peyton Manning's signing with the Denver Broncos (to the tune of "Ziggy Stardust")
- a song about Tebow's signing by the New England Patriots as a backup to Tom Brady (to the tune of "Rebel Rebel")

The first song (titled "Tebowie") was released as a 7" vinyl record as a 2012 Record Store Day exclusive. (The B side was a cover of the Reading Rainbow theme song sung in the style of The Doors.)

==== Chicken Band ====
Jimmy, Blake Shelton, Nick Offerman, and writer Chris Tartaro dressed up in chicken suits and sang The Lumineers' "Ho Hey", but replaced all the lyrics with chicken clucks, singing as the band "The Chickeneers" on a show before Easter in 2013.

In April 2013, Jimmy, Tartaro, Amy Poehler, and Michael Bublé formed the band "cluck." and sang "Some Nights" by fun.

On November 4, 2015, Jimmy and Tartaro were joined by Meghan Trainor and Alanis Morissette to perform Morissette's "Ironic".

==== Brian Williams: Gangsta Rapper ====
Numerous clips of Brian Williams from NBC Nightly News broadcasts are edited together to make it look like Williams is rapping classic songs. So far the songs have been Snoop Dogg's part of "Nuthin' but a 'G' Thang", Warren G's "Regulate", Ice Cube's part of "Straight Outta Compton", Marky Mark and the Funky Bunch's "Good Vibrations", The Sugarhill Gang's "Rapper's Delight" (which featured a verse by Lester Holt), Young MC's "Bust a Move", Snoop Dogg's "Gin and Juice", and Sir Mix-a-Lot's "Baby Got Back".

The sketch has not been performed since Williams' suspension from NBC News in February 2015.

==== Classroom instruments ====
Jimmy with the Roots join a musical celebrity to perform one of their hits on classroom instruments. These have included:

- Carly Rae Jepsen – "Call Me Maybe" (June 8, 2012)
- Christina Aguilera – "Your Body" (using office supplies as instruments; November 2, 2012)
- Mariah Carey – "All I Want for Christmas is You" (December 4, 2012)
- Robin Thicke - "Blurred Lines" (August 1, 2013)
- Sesame Street Muppets – "Sesame Street Theme" (September 25, 2013)

==== The Ragtime Gals ====
Jimmy and three other performers (and sometimes a fifth celebrity guest) sing a modern popular song in the style of a barbershop quartet combined with reggae music.

==== First Drafts of Rock ====
Portraying their original performers on a documentary program reminiscent of Behind the Music, Jimmy and Kevin Bacon perform a parody of a classic song under the guise of it being an early draft of the actual lyrics.

=== Steel Channel shows ===
==== Ultimate Mustache Fighter ====
A program allegedly aired by NBC's "sister channel" Steel Channel (a parody of Spike,) in which competitors in wide mustache costumes compete in a "Stache Bash" in an octagonal cage similar to UFC events. Jimmy and Steve Higgins play the commentators, Brock Leonard and "The Professor" Barry Star, while competitors included Wilford Brimley, Geraldo Rivera, Gene Shalit, John Stossel, Carlos Santana, "'80s Larry Bird", "'70s Burt Reynolds", "'80s Tom Selleck", "'80s John Oates", Dr. Phil McGraw, Albert Einstein, Lionel Richie, Herman Cain and Super Mario (with run-ins by "'70s David Crosby"—covered in a white powder), what was originally thought to be Charlie Chaplin's mustache that turned out to actually be the mustache of Adolf Hitler, "'80s Dr. J", and "The Masked Mustache" (wearing a luchador-style mask).

The fight is inevitably interrupted by a promo for another program on Steel Channel, usually Detective Jam Face (played by A.D. Miles), but also once Mustaches on Ice (a Christmas figure skating special featuring the UMF competitors). By the time the program returns, the fight had already ended—with Brock and Barry often hailing the unseen finish as being a historic UMF moment.

==== Kicking Stuff ====
Another program on the Steel Channel ("from the creators of Ultimate Mustache Fighter") is Kicking Stuff, where a man named Jonathan (Bobby Tisdale) takes ordinary objects, places them on top of an overturned orange bucket, and then kicks them off. After kicking the object, he points at the camera and yells "Kicking stuff!"

After showing some footage from the show, Jimmy brings out Jonathan and has him kick something live in studio.

==== Sports Freak-Out! ====
The Steel Channel's sports report, somewhat of a parody of SportsCenter. Jimmy and Higgins play "extreme" anchors Cory van Funk and Bert Donovan, respectively. The report consists of a few segments: "Check Out This Dude", where they make fun of pictures of athletes; "Point / Counterpunch", where one anchor (usually Donovan) makes an argument and the other (usually van Funk) responds by punching him in the face; and "Making Terrible Things Happen With Our Minds", where video clips are intercut with close-ups of the anchors' faces concentrating, and then the person in the clip has an accident. In a recent version, Chris Kattan appeared as a depressed skateboarding teenager who reviews monster truck shows; when the hosts got him to open up about what was bothering him (beliefs he is unloved by his father), they cut him off and finished the sketch. The sketch ends with the anchors blowing on an animal horn to summon the "T-shirt yeti", who comes out and throws T-shirts into the audience.

=== Audience Suggestion Box ===
Jimmy opens this sketch by saying, "We're always striving to get better here at Late Night." This is followed by him and The Roots imitating a bar from Daft Punk's "Harder, Better, Faster, Stronger'", which punctuates the camera zooming in on Jimmy four times. Suggestions ranging from the mundane ("book Sandra Bullock soon" or "more audience member close-ups") to the silly (such as "have a stuntman dressed as Abraham Lincoln fall down the stairs" or "recreate the cover of Nirvana's Nevermind with a grown man instead of a baby") are supposedly contributed by audience members. A frequent "suggestion" is to have Black Simon & Garfunkel (actually The Roots' Captain Kirk and Questlove, complete with an album cover parodying Bookends) perform a current pop song in the style of a Simon & Garfunkel song (always ending with the "lie-la-lie" chorus from the song "The Boxer").

=== Screengrabs ===
Sort of an updated version of Jay Leno's "Headlines", Fallon shows viewer-submitted screen shots from various media (phones, Internet, television, etc.) that contain typos or similar accidentally funny errors, using an iPad (Apple Inc. is one of the show's main sponsors). The final selection is always a picture of a man who the viewer claims looks like Jimmy, who will then put on a costume to match.

=== Bothered with Robert Pattinson ===
In this segment, Jimmy presents videos from a website <http://RobertIsBothered.com> that Robert Pattinson has set up to discuss things that bother him. Jimmy stars as Pattinson in character as Edward Cullen from the Twilight films, but with his actual British accent. Throughout the segment he sits in a tree and talks about what bothers him, all from the perspective of Pattinson. Also making an appearance is a blow-up doll representing Kristen Stewart. Things bothering Robert include Daniel Radcliffe (a competing video shows Radcliffe as Harry Potter – also played by Fallon – is bothered by Pattinson), Shark Week, Snickers ads in magazines, Halloween costumes and candy, the novel New Moon and vampires in general, Valentine's Day, the iPad, the World Cup, and Thanksgiving. On March 1, 2010, celebrating Jimmy's first year of hosting, the real Pattinson came on to promote the film Remember Me. During the sketch, he interrupted Jimmy, saying "I don't talk like that!" Jimmy then asked Robert how that made him feel, eventually getting him to say "bothered!"

=== Reflections with Justin Bieber ===
Jimmy as Justin Bieber will sit by a reflecting pool and discuss topics that are on his mind. He will begin by talking about his own life (his appearance on CSI: Crime Scene Investigation, his new position as host of Punk'd), but then start rambling on about more serious topics, such as John F. Kennedy assassination conspiracy theories, the subprime mortgage crisis, his fears that China's economy will overtake that of the United States, and the ethics of human cloning. It also shows him dancing, eating snacks, and receiving phone calls from other celebrities such as President Obama, Chuck Norris, and Alan Greenspan. (The real Bieber joined Jimmy-as-Bieber during the dance segments on the installment which aired the day before the release of Bieber's movie Justin Bieber: Never Say Never.) At the end the segment, Bieber leaves in a magical fashion, such as walking on water, opening a wormhole, or transforming himself into golden retriever puppy Gary Frick from the "If Puppies Could Vote" sketch.

After the November 2011 paternity rumors involving Bieber, Jimmy-as-Bieber came on the show and performed his new song, "(It's Not My) Baby".

=== Head Swap ===
Jimmy introduces a segment which will supposedly present images of two celebrities whose heads have been swapped through digital photo manipulation. A "Head Swap" song plays, ostensibly a short introductory jingle using sing-a-long lyrics and illustrated by a series of still photos. However, the song becomes an extended narrative set in the offices of Late Night, depicting Jimmy asking a member of the show's graphics department to create "Head Swap" images. In each instance of the sketch, a different set of bizarre complications ensue, involving Jimmy in outlandish situations (such as the accidental death of a co-worker and their attempts to hide the body because the graphic artist is on parole didn't want to go back to prison for her murder; although at the end she was only unconscious) which push the actual "Head Swap" to a secondary issue. The conflict is eventually resolved, and only one image of a "Head Swap" is shown as the song ends.

=== Letters Home / Letters to Santa ===
Various members of the show's crew, and often one of the guests, read letters they have written to their parents in the manner of children at a summer camp. While they are reading, an overlay of the actual letter slowly comes into view. Lastly, Jimmy takes out some parchment, an ink well, and a large quill and proceeds to write his letter, in calligraphy, in Victorian era-style language with a voice to match.

During the Christmas season, the letters are written to Santa Claus instead. In honor of the final episode of The Oprah Winfrey Show, the sketch aired with letters written to Oprah Winfrey.

=== 12 Days of Christmas Sweaters ===
A yearly Christmas tradition on the show (according to Jimmy) is bringing out a large board (the Countdown to Christmas Cabinet) with 12 numbered doors in the manner of an Advent calendar. The number of the door opened corresponds to the number of days left before the show's holiday break. Behind each door is a sweater. Jimmy picks a seat number out of a Santa hat, and whoever in the audience has that number wins that day's sweater.

In 2013, an abbreviated version of the series ("The 5 Days of Christmas Sweaters") aired because Jimmy hosted Saturday Night Live during what normally would be the second week of the segment.

=== Late Night Stocking Stuffers ===
In a manner reminiscent of Oprah on her talk show, Jimmy gives a gift to the entire audience each day during the last week before the show's holiday break.

=== New iPhone Apps ===
Jimmy plugs in his iPhone to a monitor to show off some new applications he's discovered. One of these apps always deals with a picture of the head of comedian Paul Reiser (such as "ReiserTris", a Tetris-like game with Reiser heads instead of the regular Tetris blocks). On one version, Jimmy used an app designed to locate Reiser, and it displayed "I am 8 feet behind you", then Reiser did a cameo. Another recurring app is "Axl Rose Relaxation Tapes", with the Guns N' Roses frontman (actually Jimmy) singing over relaxing sounds such as wolves howling or thunderstorms, usually ending with him yelling "Take a nap!"

The official Late Night with Jimmy Fallon iPhone app, released November 10, 2010, has a feature called "Jimmy's Phone", which allows users to use some of the apps featured in the sketch, including "Axl Rose Relaxation Tapes", "Moldova Y/N" (which uses your phone's GPS to tell you whether or not you're currently in that eastern European nation), "iBanana" (which allows the user to virtually peel and eat a banana), "Lint Brush" (allowing users to virtually clean lint off themselves), "Wet Cement" (allowing users to virtually draw in wet cement), and "Bieber yourself" (allowing users to photoshop Justin Bieber's hair on to pictures of themselves).

=== Who Cares Hindenburg ===
After Jimmy briefly mentions three trivial celebrity news items, he declares that the stories should be placed into the "Who Cares Hindenburg." Steve Higgins provides new narration to the classic newsreel footage of the destruction of the zeppelin LZ 129 Hindenburg (imitating Herbert Morrison's "Oh, the humanity" radio narration). The newsreel footage has had a news crawl featuring the three news items superimposed over the zeppelin to make it look like a modern blimp. The new narration always ends with the exclamation "Who cares?" A frequent target is Fall Out Boy bassist Pete Wentz.

=== ?uestions ===
We listen in on Roots drummer ?uestlove as he thinks some quasi-intellectual thoughts such as "what do you do when the fire escape catches on fire?" or "how do you throw out a trash can?" (he cocks his head and looks off into the distance, nodding occasionally, as we listen to his pre-recorded narration).

=== Andy Rooney ===
In "Post-Apocalypse Andy Rooney", Jimmy plays former 60 Minutes commentator Andy Rooney as he gives his thoughts about life in a world after a nuclear war and zombie uprising.

After Rooney's retirement, the sketch became "What is Andy Rooney doing now?", showing how Rooney is spending his free time, (i.e. calling everyone in the phone book and ranting to anyone that will listen).

Jimmy stopped doing Rooney impressions after the real Rooney's death in late 2011.

=== Obama Expressions ===
Jimmy, claiming to be an expert on facial expressions, explains the meanings behind numerous expressions made by U.S. president Barack Obama. The expressions are usually explained by a short phrase (such as "determined yet hopeful"), until the end of the segment, which features pictures from President Obama's February 2009 meeting with Canadian prime minister Stephen Harper; at this point the phrases become overly long drivel about 1980s or 1990s youth popular culture (often food and sitcoms), reminiscing over minute details about the subject. Jimmy once did this segment with photos of Secretary of State Hillary Clinton in place of Obama.

=== He Said, She Said ===
Somewhat similar to "Obama Expressions", Jimmy shows a series of photos, each showing a man and a woman. Jimmy then explains what the people in the photos are thinking. The first person's thought is somewhat regular (e.g. "I'm feeding him! This is so romantic!" for a picture of a wife feeding her husband) while their partner's thought is a humorous rejoinder (e.g. "She's feeding me! This is so humiliating!").

=== Animal Thoughts ===
Similar to "He Said, She Said", photos of people with their pets are shown, with the pets' thoughts being the punchlines.

=== Don't Quote Me ===
Jimmy reads off some famous quotes that he found on Facebook, along with some other quotes allegedly by the same person, but of dubious provenance. (E.g. Lance Armstrong: "I'll spend the rest of my life trying to earn back trust and apologize to people for the rest of my life." Also from Armstrong: "Are there any drugs that can help me do that?")

=== Speech Timeline ===
Often after a speech by President Obama, Jimmy will give a timeline of events, starting with actual statements from the speech. The bit will eventually introduce Vice President Joe Biden, who will interrupt Obama in the manner of a spoiled child.

=== Video Vision ===
While cleaning his office, Jimmy claims to have found some VHS cassettes from a 1980s production company named Video Vision. The videos are usually short instructional pieces (such as "Dealing with Sexual Harassment in the Workplace"), or holiday guides with bizarre factual errors such as "Christmas was founded in Downtown Europe". They are hosted by Jimmy (as James Fallon) with a spiked haircut, thick glasses, cheesy sweater and faded jeans, and have many of the hallmarks of video production of the mid-1980s, including low video quality, awkward scene transitions, choppy edits, low-quality special effects, and cheesy graphics which include typos and spelling errors. Portions of the video tape may have been "accidentally" taped over with 1980's sitcoms.

=== Cupid's Arrow ===
Jimmy finds some old tapes of men from a 1980s video dating service that used to tape in Studio 6-B called "Cupid's Arrow". The videos are low quality (possibly because they were produced by Video Vision). The men featured are unattractive losers, and Jimmy stated that most of them were probably still available.

The sketch was later made into a Dating Game-style TV show hosted by Tony Sanders (played by Higgins) with three of the men: Chester Mann (played by Salahuddin), a perverted part-time shoe salesman and freeloader; James Spadge (played by Miles), a nerd with unusual medical conditions who lives with his mother; and Jose (played by Jimmy), a flamboyant musician who joined the service to prove to his friends he isn't gay; and a female audience member as the contestant, with the video quality downgraded to look like it was from the 1980s. Jose is always the winner.

=== Product Placement Preacher ===
To get the audience excited about the show's sponsors, a fake gospel preacher named Rev. Daryl Bivens (played by Bashir Salahuddin) preaches about the products. Products have included the Big Philly Cheesesteak from Subway, Previlosec heartburn medication, and Toby's Rock Salt.

=== Shout-Outs ===
After Jimmy gives a shout-out to someone, Questlove asks Jimmy if he can give a shout-out to someone as well. After doing so, other members of the cast and crew (usually including Kamal Gray, writer Morgan Murphy, director Dave Diomedi (always to his wife and about their sex life), Tariq Trotter (usually about some sort of craft or cooking project; Trotter wears a blondish-red wig while demonstrating it), or a character played by Bashir Salahuddin) interrupt and ask for shout-outs to people or things of their own. At the end, Jimmy quickly recaps each of the shout-outs.

=== New Velvet Elvises ===
Jimmy shows a series of velvet Elvises (or "velvet Elvii" as Jimmy claims they are also called) showing Presley in contemporary situations, such as listening to an iPod, skydiving, or appearing alongside people like Neytiri from the movie Avatar, Fox News commentator Glenn Beck, or the cast of The Big Bang Theory. One of the velvet Elvises will usually include a pull-string activated "voice box" (Jimmy pulls the string and holds the painting in front of his mouth so the audience cannot see him providing the voice).

The last painting is often of Elvis in a beige jumpsuit performing a particularly boring activity (e.g. taking a nap after doing a crossword puzzle, sitting on a park bench feeding birds). After Jimmy comments on just how boring the activity is, a Boring Elvis impersonator comes out and sings a song about the activity.

=== Rejected Catchphrases ===
Jimmy claims to have had a character left out of various movies and video games, such as Transformers: Revenge of the Fallen or Call of Duty: Modern Warfare 2. He shows us a series of outtakes of him spouting bad attempts at catchphrases. Jimmy will also sometimes enlist actors promoting new movies to be in outtakes from those movies with him (including Jude Law for Sherlock Holmes and Kim Cattrall for Sex and the City 2).

=== Milky J ===
After Jimmy passingly mentions the Hubble Space Telescope, a man in the audience dressed head to toe in New York Yankees apparel named Milky J (Bashir Salahuddin) enthusiastically begins listing and showing photos of astronomical features photographed by the telescope, each one punctuated by him yelling "Hubble gotchu!" He also sang a song about it, and later showed a rap video he made. This sketch's timing may be based on the song "Rock You" by The Roots.

He appeared in a recent shout-outs sketch, sending shout-outs to molecular models. Jimmy said he recognized him and Milky J explained that since Hubble is being phased out and replaced by the James Webb Space Telescope, he'd found a new interest. Jimmy then convinced him that Hubble is still something to get excited about, which made him go back into his old shtick.

Later, Jimmy mentioned a new planet, and Milky J showed up and went into his routine, but Jimmy once again mentioned how Hubble is being replaced by the James Webb Space Telescope. Milky J then did a rap video about his trip to NASA's Goddard Space Flight Center in Greenbelt, Maryland to try to convince them to stop the new telescope from being launched.

Milky J recently appeared in another shoutouts sketch, this time giving a shoutout to gravity: breaking his unfaithful wife's valuables by dropping them and saying "gravity got it".

=== How You Like Me Now? ===
Jimmy begins telling a story, but a man in the crowd wearing a Hawaiian shirt and a New York Mets bucket hat (Mike Dicenzo) interrupts, linking the beginning of Jimmy's story to Late Night via an extended word association, after which he says "how you like me now?". After he does it twice, Jimmy does one as well, causing the man to declare Jimmy the superior player and leave the studio in shame, despite Jimmy's repeated attempts to make him stay.

During the sketch that aired March 11, 2013, as Bucket Hat guy went to leave, Laina the Overly Attached Girlfriend appeared near the exit, wearing an identical Hawaiian shirt and bucket hat. Despite Jimmy's attempts to get the two of them together, Bucket Hat Guy retreated from the exit to the safety of Jimmy's guest chair.

=== At the Bar with Roger Federer ===
Jimmy shows a clip from a late-night Tennis Channel show starring Roger Federer (played by Jimmy) called At the Bar with Roger Federer, where the tennis star hangs out in a bar and does strange things, including performing yo-yo tricks, identifying objects (incorrectly) by smell, and discussing his love/hate relationship with his good friend but fierce competitor Rafael Nadal. The sketch only airs during Grand Slam Tennis Tournaments, the current one of which Federer discusses during "The Sports" segment. The most recent edition of this sketch involved Federer buying "a round of drinks on the Federer," then serving a tennis ball between his legs so it causes John McEnroe's drink to spill, which in turn provokes McEnroe to stand up angrily and yell, "Come on, Roger! God! You cannot be serious!" The camera then cuts back to Federer, who casually says "That one's on me," as if nothing happened.

=== Flame Eyes ===
Less a full sketch and more a recurring bit, Jimmy will look directly into the camera and jets of fire of will emanate from his eyeballs. Sometimes, he will instead shoot laser beams. Less frequently, gobs of cooked spaghetti will come out. Jimmy will also have Steve Higgins, Questlove, and his celebrity guests play along with the gag as well. Jimmy claims the ability to do these things is a side effect of his LASIK surgery.

=== Wrestler Entrances ===
When Jimmy has a professional wrestler as a guest, they will usually enter the studio through a cloud of smoke via a trap door in one of the aisles of the audience area.

=== Small Town Festivals ===
Jimmy will read a pamphlet from an upcoming small town festival for that weekend. It is only done in the summer.

=== Do Not Play List ===
Jimmy reviews several terrible (real) albums and songs (such as Scooter's How Much Is the Fish?, Michael Henderson's Slingshot, Hulk Hogan's Hulk Rules, two tracks off of Music To Eat Oscar Mayer Weiners By (Motown style and Bossa Nova style), and A Taste of Dick Black).

=== Do Not Read List ===
Jimmy reviews several terrible (real) books (such as How to Avoid Huge Ships: Second Edition, Castration: The Advantages and the Disadvantages, Cooking With [Winnie the] Pooh, and Knitting With Dog Hair) and suggests people not read them.

=== Do Not Watch List ===
Together with the guys from the Found Footage Festival, Jimmy presents selections from old low-quality instructional VHS videos and suggests the audience avoid them (such as the owner's video for the Rejuvenique face mask, Superchops 4 Bass with Beaver Felton, and Fun with Ventriloquism).

=== Do Not Game List ===
During the show's Video Game Week in 2013, Jimmy showcased some terrible video games, such as Hooters Road Trip for the PlayStation, Captain Novolin for the Super NES, and E.T. the Extra-Terrestrial for the Atari 2600.

=== Charlie Sheen commercials ===
In the wake of Charlie Sheen's post-rehab media blitz, Jimmy appeared as Sheen in two commercials: one selling his cologne "Winning", and the other selling a Time Life collection of CDs containing outrageous quotes by him. Later, in response to the news that Ashton Kutcher would replace Sheen on Two and a Half Men, Jimmy as Sheen made a new version of Kutcher's old show Punk'd called Sheen'd in which he goes around acting obnoxious and bothering people at their jobs. The real Sheen (who also promoted his new show Anger Management) later appeared alongside Jimmy-as-Sheen in an ad for "Clone" cologne.

=== Celebrity Whispers ===
Jimmy plays British TV show host Peggy Hess, who presents a series of clips of celebrities making small-talk at functions where they are not hooked up to microphones. Whispering voices are added to the soundtrack to show what the celebrities are saying, such as Brad Pitt and Angelina Jolie discussing putting Cool Runnings in their Netflix queue, Pope Benedict XVI showing Barack Obama his fan art of Garfield, and Gary Busey explaining to John C. McGinley how he punched a mountain lion in the face and then became best friends with it.

=== Questions & Danswers ===
Jimmy sent a correspondent to the streets of New York to ask people their thoughts on different topics in the news while dancing their answers.

=== Father & Son ===
A series of animated shorts featuring a father (voiced by Jimmy) giving advice to his (silent) preteen son. This segment only airs on the Friday before Father's Day.

=== Bargain Bin ===
Jimmy showcases some items that he has found on sale at various stores. The price-reduction stickers have been strategically placed so that their names are more suggestive, turning a copy of The Very Hungry Caterpillar into The Very Hung Caterpillar or a DVD of the show Picket Fences into Picket Feces. A bath toy called "Rub-A-Dub Work & Squirt" was left alone.

=== Late Night E-Cards ===
Jimmy showcases some interesting electronic greeting cards he's discovered, with the insides being insulting to the receiver.

=== Walter Kump ===
Jimmy talks about going onto a website that does computer text-to-speech conversions, and then mentions that the computer voice is based on that of a nerdy man named Walter Kump (John Haskell). He then brings out Kump for an interview, which shows off some of the comical mispronunciations, improper enunciation and misuse of punctuation (i.e. saying the word "slash" when a "/" appears in the script) that are prominent of computer-generated voices.

Kump later announced he has chosen a second career as a rapper and has recorded a music video, which Jimmy let him play on the show.

Kump also appeared after his girlfriend (who speaks in a female robot voice) made a video of him falling while he was rollerblading that went viral.

Kump's latest appearance had him announcing he played the hero in an action movie, co-starring Kyle MacLachlan as the villain, and had Jimmy play a climactic scene from it.

=== On the Bright Side ===
Jimmy reads a somewhat depressing story from the news and then gives the silver lining. (Example: There are growing concerns about the level of privacy on Facebook. On the bright side, there's a way to post all of your information online without anyone ever seeing it – join Myspace.)

=== Night News Now ===
A parody of nightly news programs. It usually includes inane graphs; short, nonsensical weather reports; depressed sports anchors, and manipulated footage of celebrities where their faces are turned upside-down.

=== Russell Brand Reads Us Weekly ===
British comedian Russell Brand (Jimmy) comments on articles in the latest issue of Us Weekly. Some episodes have Brand reading Star instead. When the real Brand was on in February 2013, he appeared and said Jimmy's impression was terrible and read the magazine himself.

On August 9, 2012, Jimmy joined anchor Bob Costas in studio at the 2012 Summer Olympics in London, and showed a version of the sketch with Brand reading the special Olympics edition of the magazine.

=== Said It and Re-Edit ===
Jimmy boils down a week's worth of a TV show to one sentence to allow his viewers to more quickly catch up on them. The result is a humorous but still appropriate sentence, like Rachel Maddow from The Rachel Maddow Show being edited to say "Newt Gingrich had an ultrasound, and it revealed a small horse inside his stomach." The title of the sketch is a take-off of the Ronco Showtime Rotisserie Grill's slogan "set it and forget it".

=== Mitt Romney’s Rom-Bomb Video Vlog Blog ===
Jimmy as Mitt Romney attempts to reach younger voters with a video blog, however he proves he is out of touch with them instead.

=== Romney and Obama conversations ===
Jimmy as Mitt Romney and Dion Flynn as President Obama have one-on-one private conversations about their presidential debates. Both candidates criticize themselves and each other.

After President Obama was re-elected on November 6, 2012, they re-enacted Romney's concession call to President Obama, with them reminiscing about the election, then performing a duet of Paula Cole's "I Don't Want to Wait".

=== Rumor Has It ===
Jimmy will mention celebrity rumors (the setups) then tell the truth behind them (the punchlines).

=== In Reply To ===
Jimmy shows some celebrity Twitter replies to (fake) fan questions, and then reveals the original question. (e.g. Dalai Lama's reply: "Bountiful, rich, and abundant." Follower's question: "Describe your ideal guacamole.") The sketch is also similar in spirit to Johnny Carson's "Carnac the Magnificent" bits on The Tonight Show.

== Running gags ==
=== Bad joke giveaway ===
When Jimmy tells a joke in the monologue that he thinks is particularly cheesy, he will apologize then give away its cue cards to members of the audience.

=== Gary/Garrison ===
Jimmy often refers to fictional men as Gary, who are usually unintelligent or acting obnoxious and people are letting him know this. He also refers to fictional misbehaving boys as Garrison (who hates that name and wishes his parents would call him Gary).

=== Hot Sax ===
Jimmy and the gang take turns miming the saxophone solo of "Old Time Rock and Roll" while a recording of it is played.

== Sketches involving audience participation ==
=== Games ===
==== Lick it For Ten ====
A segment introduced on the show's first episode, in which Jimmy invites audience members to come on stage and lick objects, such as a lawn mower or a bowling ball, for ten dollars. Drew Barrymore and Kelly Ripa have played the game as celebrities.

==== Wheel of Carpet Samples ====
Introduced in the show's second week, this segment features a game with loosely defined rules and bizarre scoring whose theme song is an off-key version of "The Final Countdown". Three audience members are chosen to spin a wheel containing various carpet samples. The wheel includes a "mystery sample", which is revealed by the announcer to both the audience and the contestants prior to game play. Each contestant spins the wheel just once and is awarded a seemingly arbitrary point value (Jimmy tells the second contestant that the point value the first contestant scored is the maximum number of points a contestant can possibly get, and then asks if the second player can beat it). Each game contains the speed round with a "carpet sample fun fact": a piece of trivia, and the "lightning round" in which the contestant must "name as many things as possible" in three seconds (after which Jimmy names a thing that is none of the things the contestant mentioned), and a "carpet sample cartoon break", which is followed by a "the making of" featurette, then a "the making of the making of" featurette, then an epilogue of the makers of them. If a contestant lands on a piece that has already been won, Jimmy turns the wheel back five spaces. A seemingly arbitrary winner, chosen by Higgins (who wasn't paying attention because he was arguing with his wife on the phone), wins the sample of carpet on which the wheel stopped during their spin. The other two contestants each receive a consolation prize that turns out to be much more valuable than the winning contestant's prize, usually a $300 gift card to the Apple Store (the winning contestant is ultimately awarded the consolation prize as well).

==== Cell Phone Shootout ====
Jimmy picks three random audience members to come down. They are shown a table covered in various "prizes", including a large-screen plasma TV (or a MacBook, or other similarly desirable popular item), tickets to a cleaning products convention, a used trumpet, lingerie, recorded VHS tapes, donuts for the entire audience, a box of rocks, a coffee mug, a year's worth of back issues of Orthopedics magazine, a pipe carved into Jimmy's likeness, a 15-second rave, and other similar kitschy items. A Sharp 108 shows a rapid-fire series of images of the objects available to be won, with each image only visible for 1/6 of a second. When Jimmy gives the cue, the contestants must snap a picture with their cellphone of whatever item is on the screen. The contestant wins whatever item of which they have taken a picture. One unlucky female contestant's phone was so slow to take a picture that all she photographed was the game's logo after the prizes had stopped flashing. As a consolation prize, she was awarded "donuts for the entire audience". A frequent prize is "The Call of the Wolf Waker": a man (Mike Dicenzo) covered head to toe in furs performs a wolf call using his cupped hands; while he is performing the call, footage of sleeping wolves waking up is shown. Another grand prize was 15 seconds in the VIP room with two Victoria's Secret models.

==== Dance Your Hat and Gloves Off ====
In a parody of Dance Your Ass Off, Jimmy invites three audience members on stage and challenges them to put on a neon yellow wool knit cap and yellow rubber gloves and try to get them off only by whipping their body parts around. Jimmy warns that "smurfing" (wearing one's cap loosely and high on the head in the manner of a Smurf) is not allowed. Two points are awarded for removing a hat, with one point each for the gloves; ties are broken based on audience applause. The winner receives $300 in one dollar bills, although the bills are presented in strange ways, such as wadded up and stuffed in a plastic bag, stuffed into the hollow handle of a snow shovel, or taped end-to-end in a long chain. Losers receive a T-shirt. Jimmy closes the segment by reciting a rhyming verse, which in some instances of the sketch becomes absurdly long and about an embarrassing health problem Jimmy has such as genital warts.

==== Karaoke Contest ====
Jimmy challenges three audience members to a karaoke contest where they sing quotes from a celebrity, including Nicole Polizzi, John Madden and Mel Gibson; most installments use quotes from American conservative politicians and commentators, including South Carolina governor Mark Sanford; Tea Party convention speakers Tom Tancredo, Joseph Farah, and Sarah Palin; Fox News hosts Glenn Beck and Sean Hannity; and, most frequently, Rush Limbaugh. One version featured quotes from the erotic novel Fifty Shades of Grey. Another featured quotes from recent Celebrity Apprentice bootee Gary Busey. (This installment had only two audience members, with Busey himself also competing; Busey was named the winner, but Jimmy revealed that "friends, family, and the actual Gary Busey" were not eligible to receive prizes.) The most recent installment featured quotes from the cast of Duck Dynasty. The winner, determined by audience applause, receives a karaoke machine, and losers receive T-shirts or hoodies.

==== Hot Dog in a Hole ====
Jimmy invites three guests on stage, and they must attempt to throw the most hot dogs through holes carved in the mouths of large (about 6 feet tall) celebrity faces. The celebrities are usually related somehow, such as the cast of New Moon, the three men from the TV show Full House, hosts on Fox News Channel, or politicians. (An installment of the game after the House vote on the 2010 health care legislation featured Rep. Henry Waxman (D-CA); the Congressman's face had a smaller-than-usual mouth hole but added cutouts for his nostrils.) In the case of a tie, contestants participate in a sudden-death toss-off. The winner receives a hot dog toaster, and the losers receive a package of hot dogs.

==== Late Night Air Drum Challenge ====
Three audience members play air drums (similar to air guitar) along to a short drum-heavy instrumental track played by The Roots. The winner is selected by audience applause, and receives a drum kit donated by Yamaha and Zildjian. The two losers receive drumheads autographed by The Roots.

==== Celebrity Man Boobs ====
Three audience members are each shown three close-up photos of different man boobs, and are asked to pick which one belongs to a particular celebrity. The three photos are given punny names such as "Areola 51" or "Yo Flabba-Flabba". Winners receive a man boobs-themed wall calendar, and losers receive a "Man Boobs" T-shirt.

==== Competitive Spit-Takes ====
Two pairs of audience members compete. One member of each pair rolls a specially marked die to determine whether they will be spitting or receiving. The spitter takes a sip of water, and then the receiver recites the punch line to a provided joke (usually in the form of "[Normal phrase]? I thought you said [similar-sounding sexual phrase]!"), at which the spitter performs their best spit-take. Audience applause determines the winning team. Sometimes, Jimmy will have the spitter and receiver switch positions if their first spit-take is particularly good or they have extra time. The winning team receives a pair of hand towels embroidered with the "Competitive Spit-Takes" logo, while the losing team receives a pair of moist towelettes.

==== Dancing on Air ====
Three audience members select styles of dance (e.g. Irish stepdance, ballet, or disco) out of Jimmy's "Velvety Dance Bag", and then attempt to perform that dance style after being hung by a harness ten feet in the air. The winner is selected by audience applause. The winner receives a dancing-themed prize, such as Nintendo Wii and a dancing game or Arthur Murray dancing lessons, while the losers receive T-shirts.

==== Battle of the Instant Bands ====
Before the show, Jimmy selects members of the audience who are musicians but do not otherwise know each other. They are split into two "instant bands" and are given about half an hour to come up with a band name, design an album cover, and write a song to perform. Winners are determined by audience applause. Winners receive the instruments they played and a $300 gift certificate to Guitar Center, while the losers receive T-shirts.

On the June 15, 2011 show, Jimmy hosted the finalists in Rolling Stone and Garnier Fructis' "Choose the Cover" contest (Lelia Broussard from Los Angeles, California, and The Sheepdogs from Saskatoon, Saskatchewan). Prior to the show, a member of the audience (Terry Patterson from the San Francisco area) was selected and both bands had to write a song about her. Each member of both bands received a Late Night T-shirt, and the winning band (The Sheepdogs) received 20 pints of Jimmy's Ben & Jerry's flavor, "Late Night Snack".

==== Battle of the Instant Dance Crews ====
Similar to Battle of the Instant Bands, Jimmy assembles two dance crews from the audience and has them each choreograph a dance routine in under an hour. The winners each receive $300 gift cards from J.Crew, while the losers win $100 gift cards.

==== Battle of the Instant Songwriters ====
Similar to Battle of the Instant Bands, Jimmy selects three singer/songwriters from the audience and has them write a short song based on a different nonsensical phrase like "turtle sunrise" or "clouds are people too". The winner receives a $300 gift card to Guitar Center, while the losers receive $100 gift cards.

==== Put It In Reverse ====
Two audience members are given a scene to perform with Jimmy in reverse (walking backward, etc.). After they complete the scene, the footage is then shown reversed so that it looks normal. The winner is determined by audience applause, and receives a piece of reversible clothing (such as a jacket or a jersey), while the loser receives a t-shirt with a reversed Late Night logo.

==== Spanx But No Spanx ====
Two teams of three male audience members race in a relay to pass a Spanx body-shaping undergarment over their bodies as fast as possible. After taking the garment off of a mannequin, the first person steps into it and then pulls the garment over his head. The next team member then pulls the garment over his head and off over his feet. The third team member reverses direction once again and pulls the garment on feet-first. After pulling the garment over his head, the third team member then races to deposit the garment in a basket (the "Spanx Bank"). The other team members may assist in the passing of the garment, but cannot bunch it up or fold it onto itself. The winning team wins Late Night compression T-shirts and a pair of Spanx, and the losers receive regular Late Night T-shirts..

==== Say What!? ====
Three audience members "try to decipher the garbled-mouth ramblings of Rickie Johnston, a pig farmer with a real anger-management problem," according to Jimmy. Johnston (played by Bobby Tisdale) is a stereotypical redneck, dressed in a pair of overalls, a trucker's hat, and no shirt, in addition to a huge mouthful of chewing tobacco and an exaggerated Southern accent. The game has three rounds, worth 10, 100, and 1000 points. The first two rounds vary, but the third round is always "What's On Rickie's Mini-Dish Tonight?", which involves Johnston acting out a scene from a movie and the contestants must guess its title. The winner of the first installment of the game had the choice between a chocolate-covered horseshoe and a "beer-amid" (a pyramid made from cement-filled beer cans) as a prize and chose the beer-amid. The second installment of the game had as its prize a package of paper plates. The third installment awarded a watch made from a can of chewing tobacco. The losers receive a bag of frozen tater tots, with Jimmy giving Rickie a bag as well (they're his favorite).

==== Name That Guy ====
Three audience members are shown pictures of non-celebrities and each must guess the first and last name of the person shown. The images of non-famous men flashes quickly with one of a famous man second to last (usually 1990s sitcom stars). The first two contestants get a single guy to name, but the last contestant plays the "lightning round", where they try to name eight guys in 20 seconds. They show's grand prize, $15,000, has never been won, but the losers (all contestants are invariably losers) receive a T-shirt with their person's name on it (Higgins encourages all contestants to "wear your shame in style"). The spirit of the game is similar to "Wheel of Carpet Samples". Due to "lack of budget", the segment uses scene transition graphics from Home Improvement between contestants. It also features "Name That Guy Fun Facts" like "[non-famous man]" was born in Cincinnati, Ohio".

Actor Charlie Day played the game's lightning round on the July 11, 2013 episode.

==== Models and Buckets ====
Jimmy claims this is "the game that everyone is talking about." This is followed by five brief video clips of five different people (Oprah Winfrey, Chris Rock, Hillary Clinton, Brian Williams, and Glenn Beck) strung together so it sounds like they are saying the sentence, "I love Models and Buckets." The twelve models are brought out and Jimmy will ask them an open ended question, such as "How was your weekend?", with each giving a different answer simultaneously. Jimmy then brings in two male audience members who singularly select alternately a bucket held by each model (similar to Deal or No Deal) that is filled with an item such as food (e.g. orange soda, baked beans, or chocolate syrup), confetti, or packing peanuts to be tipped over the contestant's head by that model. The hope is to find the bucket that contains fake $1 bills. The losing contestant receives a Late Night bucket hat (Jimmy and The Roots then begin a rap interlude about the bucket hat). The initial installment of the game used 16 buckets instead of 12. When only six buckets remain, the game enters the "double trouble" phase, where each contestant selects a bucket to be tipped simultaneously. If a contestant wins early in the game, Jimmy will have the models reset with new buckets and the contestants play a second game for another $100. In one installment, both contestants won $100, and the bucket hat was not awarded. Contestants also a receive new clean clothing backstage afterwards.

==== Buzzwords ====
Jimmy had audience members roll a twenty-sided die with a letter on each face (likely taken from the game Scattergories) and say as many words that start with that letter, with rules such as no proper nouns, no long pauses between words, etc. Contestants win $10 cash for each correct word.

==== Copy Machine Match Game ====
While two audience members are blindfolded and wear noise-canceling headphones on stage, Jimmy selects another audience member to come down and photocopy their face; after doing so, that person returns to their seat. Singularly each of two contestants are given the photocopy and the task to run into the audience to find the photocopied person. While they are searching, the Roots play music whose tempo slows or fastens depending on how "hot" or "cold" the contestant is in their search. The contestant that finds the photocopied person fastest is declared the winner and receives a desktop printer/fax/scanner/copier, while both the loser and the photocopied person receive a ream of copy paper.

==== Karate Piñata ====
Three blindfolded audience members attempt to break ball-shaped piñatas with smiley faces on them (which "bear a striking resemblance to celebrities in the news") rotating around them using only karate kicks. Ties are broken by "kicking awesomeness" (as voted on by the audience). The winner receives $300 worth of Old El Paso boxed taco kits (brought out by Gwar and Dwar), while the losers receive Late Night black belts.

==== What's Mine Is Yours ====
Five audience members each donate one of their possessions to a communal "jackpot". Jimmy spices it up by adding the contents of a wallet in his pocket, including $500 (sometimes in cash, sometimes as a gift card to the Apple Store).

Each of the five audience members has their name on a tile in a bucket. Jimmy singularly pulls a tile from the bucket to eliminate contestants until only one contestant is left, who wins everything in the jackpot. The other four contestants receive Late Night T-shirts or sweatshirts.

==== Doll Posin' ====
Three audience members are singularly shown a collectible doll for five seconds, and then have thirty seconds to assume the pose of the doll as closely as possible using a box of props and costumes. Contestants that have yet to play are placed beneath large blue sensory-deprivation "domes of silence". The winner is chosen by audience applause; in the first installment, the winner received a three-foot-tall Barbie doll, but in later installments the prize was $100 and the doll the contestants were imitating. Losers receive doll-sized Late Night T-shirts.

==== Darts of Insanity ====
A series of stunts, each with an associated point value, cycles rapid-fire on the "Dartboard of Insanity" (the Sharp 108). Three audience members singularly shoot a Nerf dart gun at the Dartboard, stopping the cycle on a particular stunt. Whichever contestant completes the stunt with the highest point value is declared the winner. All three contestants receive $100 and either a T-shirt or a "beer koozie sweatshirt" (a sweatshirt with a pocket for a beer bottle on the front), although only the winner receives his $100 in the form of a giant check.

Only a few of the "available" games are ever played. Some of the games are highlighted by Jimmy before the game; some are named and also described – these are usually over the top. Still others only ever appear in the rotation. The last game to be played is always "Dude Spoon". (Some contestants land on "Dude Spoon," but are given the option to spin again; they then land on "Double Dude Spoon", where they have to spoon with two dudes instead of just one.) The point value of games can vary from episode to episode.

Available games include:

In the rotation only: Beat Your Meat (3 points), Believe it or Snot (6 points), Bride of Spanxenstein (5/6 points), Emission Possible (3 points), Fish Sandwich (3 points), Germs of Endearment (6 points), Hog-Tied and Lovin' It! (6 points), Honey Nut Pantyhose (6 points), Melt Your Face Off (15 points), Nip R.I.P. (12 points), Peanut Butter Pickle Face (3/5/6 points), Pickle Tickle (3/6 points), Purple Nurple (12 points), Sausage-Link Jump Rope (6 points), Veggie Wedgie (3 points), and Whack-A-Sack (3 points)

Described: Cat Nips (10 points – the contestant is strapped down and catnip is sprinkled on their nipples, and 12 cats are let loose to "go to town" on them), Expired Milkshake of Pain (12 points – the contestant must think about an expired milkshake while being shocked with a cattle prod), Fondles the Clown (3/10/12 points – a guy is taken off the street, dressed up like a clown, and tickles the contestant in his "swimsuit area"), Goblet of Shame (12 points – involves a medieval goblet and full frontal nudity), Hula Hoop of Horror (12 points – the contestant hula hoops while 15 strangers wearing hoods shock him with cattle prods), Jelly Sock of Death (3/10 points – the contestant is hit with a sock filled with jelly), Rabbit Punch (12 points – the contestant names a number from 1 to 12, and then a guy dressed in a rabbit costume punches them in the back as hard as he can), and Stank Hose (12 points – the contestant is whipped with a smelly garden hose)

Played: Blindfold Balloon Pop (5 points – a blindfolded contestant must pop 3 balloons by stomping on them), Dude Spoon (10/15 points – the contestant must spoon with a guy named Sebastian (Seth Herzog)), Egg Head (5 points – the contestant must put a large Easter egg on his head and dance the "ancient mystical dance of the egg-head"), Grab the Balls in Your Nutsack (10 points – while blindfolded, the contestant must determine how many blue balls are in a large sack filled with circus peanuts), Guac Head (3/4 points – the contestant has guacamole smeared into his hair), "Late Night Snack" Slip 'n Slide (5 points – the contestant traverses a Slip 'n Slide lubricated with melted ice cream), Hot Dog in a Hole (5/10 points – a solo version of the regular game; the contestant tries to score 7 hits), Look at Yourself (12 points – the contestant must look at themselves in a mirror for 30 seconds without laughing while Jimmy goads them), Nutsack Attack!! (10 points – the contestant must search through a large sack of peanuts for the "money nut" [a red walnut]), Pumpkin Head (5 points – the contestant must put a hollowed-out pumpkin on his head and dance the "ancient mystical dance of the pumpkin-head"), Puppy Chow (5/10 points – the contestant has a can of dog food eaten off his stomach by puppies), Shake Your Balls Off! (5/10 points – the contestant wears a Velcro diaper covered with balls and must shake them all off without using his hands), Syrup Hat (6 points – the contestant must reach into a large jar filled with warm maple syrup, retrieve a baseball cap, and put it on), and Yuck Uggs (3/5 points – the contestant must put on a pair of Ugg boots [one filled with chocolate pudding and the other with tapioca] and dance for 10 seconds)

==== Wax On, Wax Off ====
Two audience members (including at least one male) participated as a team: one contestant is tasked with answering trivia questions, with each correct answer awarding $100 to the team. If they answer incorrectly, their partner must have a portion of his chest hair removed with a hot wax strip as a penalty. However, all of the questions are obscure, Jeopardy!-like clues where the contestants are never able to provide a correct response, with categories as "13th Century South American Architecture", "Much Ado About 'Quantum Mechanics'" (with "quantum mechanics" in quotation marks), "Sri Lankan Prime Ministers", and "Other, Lesser Known Sri Lankan Prime Ministers".

The second-last question is a "Double Trouble" round worth $200 (but requiring two strips of hair to be pulled for an incorrect answer), which usually has the category "Numbers", and simply asks the contestant to think of a number between 1 and 1000. After the contestant makes a guess, Fallon gives them an opportunity to change their answer, only to reveal that the correct number was actually their first guess. The "Lightning Round" features categories flashing by quickly, with easy categories like music, TV, and movies being skipped over for another difficult category at the end. As a consolation prize, the contestants are given "Ed Zeppelin" T-shirts (also a prize in the "Wheel of Game Shows" game) and a 24-pack of Nad's body hair removal strips. To date, no one has answered a single question correctly.

The person being waxed in the installment that aired May 15, 2011, was New York Jets center Nick Mangold.

==== Wheel of Game Shows ====
Another surreal game in the spirit of "Wheel of Carpet Samples". Three audience members play mini-games selected by pressing the "game pud" (a buzzer) as the options rotate on the Sharp 108 (similar to the game show Press Your Luck). If a player lands on a picture of actor Steve Guttenberg, however, they lose their turn and owe the show $75 (similar to Press Your Luck's "Whammy"). To this end, Jimmy urges the contestants to shout "No Guttenbergs!" as the monitor rotates.

Games available include: "Animal Farm", "Brownie Points", "Dance Dance Dance", "Drawing Board", "Find the Red Tissue", "Grab the Cupcake", "Grocery List", "Guess the Card", "Hands in Your Pants", "Harry Potter Trivia vs. the Roots", "Heads or Tails?", "Hide the Shoe", "iCarly Trivia vs. the Roots", "Jellybean Jar", "Magnet Scramble", "Number Jumbler", "Number Scramble", "Picture Puzzle", "Remember That Episode of Full House", "Rock, Paper, Scissors, Nuclear Warhead", "Snap Judgment", "Tarantula Bonanza", "True or False", "Wet Nap Face Slap", "What's In The Box?", "What's the Difference?", "Where Did You Get That Shirt?", "Word of the Day", "Yes or No", and "You Can't Possibly Win!".

After all contestants inevitably tie at zero points since Jimmy doesn't tell them how to play the games, even after a "tiebreaker" (such as "Brownie Points", "Shut Your Pie Hole", or "Egg On Your Face"), they all receive copies of the Saturday Night Live board game (with three pieces missing) and Led Zeppelin T-shirts where the first "L" has fallen off so that they read "Ed Zeppelin". (Later installments of the game substitute a copy of Jimmy's CD Blow Your Pants Off for the SNL board game.)

==== Put It On a Cracker ====
Two audience members compete. Each is blindfolded and fed a cracker with three different foods on top (such as pepperoni, peanut butter, and Swedish fish). They must try to name as many of the ingredients as they can. The winner receives a $300 gift certificate to Whole Foods, while the loser gets to interact with a celebrity impersonator (such as Abraham Lincoln or young Santa Claus) (and is also given a $150 gift certificate to Whole Foods).

==== Ready Set Flow ====
Three audience members compete. They are each given three nouns (an object, a place, and a name - e.g. Barbie Doll, France, and Charlie Sheen) they must work into a 30-second freestyle rap. The nouns are generated by "Rhyme Wave", a "robot" (played by Tariq Trotter) with a computerized voice that appears on the Sharp 108. The winner is determined by audience applause. The winner receives a TASCAM pocket studio digital recorder, while the runners-up receive Late Night T-shirts, notepads, and pens to write down their own raps.

==== Sing It Like You Mean It ====
Two audience members compete. Each is played a new song by the Roots that they must memorize and then immediately perform. The contestant that has yet to play is placed beneath a large blue sensory-deprivation "dome of silence". The winner is determined by audience applause, and is given a $100 bill and a burned CD with their song rendition on it, while the loser receives a Late Night T-shirt.

==== Tell Us What You Know ====
Three audience members compete. Each is given a topic by Jimmy and is given 10 seconds to give as many words as possible relating to that topic. After time is up, they are given a score by the "Brainmaster" (Mike Dicenzo, wearing a brown robe, turban, and a large, light-up brain). The winner is given a special prize in an ornate wooden chest (selected by the Brainmaster). The two losers receive cans of Turtle Wax. (The winner's prize, coincidentally, is also Turtle Wax.) (In one playing, the contestants received giftcards to Subway, and the winner also received a bag of potato chips autographed by Tony Danza.)

==== Sounds... Good? ====
Three audience members compete. They are each given a song to sing karaoke-style – with the catch that they will be wearing noise-canceling headphones so they cannot hear themselves sing. Also, cowboy DJ Munson Rawlings (Gerard Bradford) will be manipulating the pitch of the song, which they must match. The winner is determined by audience applause, and wins a pair of noise-canceling headphones, while the losers receive Late Night hoodies.

==== Do the Blank ====
On May 15, 2013, Jimmy invented a new game. Two audience members, a young man and a young woman, were invited to the stage for a dancing competition. Jimmy placed them on either side of a small barrier (so that they could not see each other), then he called out the names of made-up dances which they performed for a few moments, while the Roots played music. The dances Jimmy announced were "The Bro-Bot," "The Freaky Frog," "The Elevator," "The Disco Dentist," "Hand Dancin'," "The Sexy Sway," and "The Flying Tornado." To choose a winner, Jimmy proposed a "Blank-Off" and pressed the "Button of Boogie." A prepared slot machine gave each contestant three "random" words for a final dance: the young woman was given "Pogo Stick Paperboy" and the young man received "The Glowing Thong." The contestants performed their interpretations of these last dances, as before, and then received prizes.

=== Other sketches ===
==== Shared Experience ====
Introduced in the third week of the show, this segment consists of the audience and show members participating in an experience together. In the first show, these experiences were to eat a Warhead sour candy, wear a Snuggy, and make a bird call. Other "Shared Experiences" have involved playing with an inflated beach ball and shooting Nerf guns at A.D. Miles while he quietly played Jenga by himself.

==== President of the Audience ====
During the show's first week, on March 5, 2009, Jimmy picked three random audience members and elected one of them to be president of the audience for the night. Later that night, MSNBC host Rachel Maddow appeared in a breaking news segment and reported that his approval ratings were dropping. Attack ads from his opponent were also shown, accusing the president of being a flip flopper when it came to liking Jimmy's jokes. The old president was later "impeached" on April 17, 2009, and a new president was appointed. On March 10, 2010, after Jimmy complained that neither of the previous presidents ever showed up to work, he "elected" a new president by picking one audience member at random. Jimmy gave the new president a "presidential starter kit", including a copy of the Late Night by-laws, a quill pen, a carton of cigarettes, a stapler, and a first lady with "shapely arms". After an attack ad on behalf of another audience member, NBC Nightly News weekend anchor Lester Holt gave a news report about the president's short term thus far.

==== Beef Solvers ====
A recurring sketch in which audience members are called upon to stand in for celebrities who are having public feuds and come to a mutual understanding. Segments have included two men as Angelina Jolie and Jennifer Aniston, two white women as 50 Cent and Rick Ross, Perez Hilton and Carrie Prejean, Adam Lambert and Clay Aiken, and Glenn Beck and Keith Olbermann. One sketch involved four audience members reenacting the feud between Paula Abdul, Randy Jackson, Simon Cowell, and Ryan Seacrest regarding the new contract offered to Mr. Seacrest as the host of American Idol and the fact that she wasn't made a similar offer by the show's producers (she would eventually announce that she was not returning to the show).

==== Freestylin' with The Roots ====
Jimmy asks audience members random questions. House band The Roots then makes up a song about them on the spot using that information in a music style of Jimmy's choosing (reggae, '80s pop, doo-wop, etc.). When Ringo Starr was a guest on the show, there was an all-Beatles version; during "Rolling Stones Week", there was an all-Stones version. While the show was in Indianapolis for Super Bowl XLVI, the Roots were joined in freestylin' by the Indianapolis Symphony Orchestra.

On the September 11, 2012 episode, one of the audience members selected was Andy Murray; The Roots did a song about him winning the 2012 US Open in the style of Scottish band The Proclaimers. On the October 2, 2012 episode, Alec Baldwin was selected; his song was about the seventh and final season premiere of 30 Rock.

==== What's on Your Facebook page? ====
The camera isolates on random audience members and a Facebook status for them appears which says an intimate personal thought about them.

==== What's on Your Playlist? ====
Same aspect of What's on Your Facebook?, the camera isolates on random audience members and a graphic of an iPod appears showing what songs the person has on theirs, which is usually something extremely personal or obscene.

==== Think About It ====
Three audience members are hooked up to the "Think-O-Sync-ometer" (a box with a red button, later renamed the "Intel Think-O-Sync-ometer 8500") by wearing a "wireless Think-O-Read-ometer headband" (an elastic headband with a suction cup), making sure that the "cerebral cortex nipple" is facing out. They are then asked to concentrate for 15 seconds on a particular subject provided by Jimmy. Then, after pressing the button on the Think-O-Sync-ometer, Jimmy "pokes" each contestant's cerebral cortex nipple, allowing the Think-O-Sync-ometer to "project" the audience member's thoughts.

==== Audience Voicemails ====
Jimmy selects members of the audience and puts their cellphones into the "Hacker 9000" (which Jimmy claims is top-secret technology that only he and Rupert Murdoch know about), which scans the phone and plays the last received voicemail, which is usually something embarrassing (like a bookstore calling to let them know the Justin Bieber books they ordered have come in, or a gay strip club offering a man a job, or a man's college roommate reminiscing about drunken pranks).

==== Audience Artwork ====
Jimmy provides the audience with paper and packs of markers and asks them to draw whatever they want. He then goes into the audience and reads off some audience members' names and has them show off their drawings.

==== Late Night Perm Week ====
Every night during the week of February 7 to 11, 2011, the Late Night crew choose one male audience member with straight hair and gave him a perm. He was interviewed with friends before the procedure, then the perm was revealed during the show. Jimmy wore a perm wig during the sketches. Late Night Perm Week returned May 21 to 25, 2012, as well as July 15 to 19, 2013.

==== My Kids Are Weird ====
Jimmy showcases children with weird talents like reciting 86 digits of π or contorting their body into the shape of a pretzel while eating a soft pretzel. Jimmy then gives each child a Hawaiian shirt and a metal detector (an homage to his own childhood pastime of searching for buried treasure in his backyard).

==== Audience Got Talent ====
An homage to America's Got Talent, Jimmy selects members of the audience and has them demonstrate a talent or perform a trick.

== Recurring segments featuring celebrity guests ==
=== Charades ===
Jimmy and a celebrity guest each pair with an audience member to play charades. Jimmy has played with Cameron Diaz, Amy Poehler, and teamed up with Poehler to take on the then-husband/wife team of Fred Armisen and Elisabeth Moss. He also teamed up with his former SNL Weekend Update partner Tina Fey to play against their successors as Weekend Update anchors, Amy Poehler and Seth Meyers. Jimmy teamed up with Nene Leakes to take on the team of Donald Trump and Lil Jon after Trump announced Leakes and Lil Jon as cast members for The Celebrity Apprentice on that night's episode. Most lately, Charades are played with various actors, such as Benedict Cumberbatch, Cara Delevingne and Gaten Matarazzo. Usually, only two guests are invited, one of them joining Jimmy, and another joining one of The Roots (usually Tariq or Questlove).

=== Pictionary ===
Jimmy and a celebrity guest each pair with an audience member, or with two other celebrities, to play a version of the board game Pictionary. Guest players have included Tina Fey (October, 2012), Jennifer Aniston, Melissa McCarthy, Lenny Kravitz, CeeLo Green, Katie Couric, and many others.

=== Password ===
After showing a brief clip of the original black-and-white Password from the 1960s (originally hosted by Allen Ludden, Betty White's husband), Jimmy played Betty (along with two audience members) in a game of Password hosted by Higgins on a recreation of the original Password set. Jimmy later teamed up with Robert De Niro to play against Bradley Cooper and an audience member.

Since then, Password became a regular game within the show. Usually, the celebrities team up with Fallon on one side or Tariq/Questlove on another, with Higgins being the host of the game. Four rounds are played with a possible fifth round, depending on the score and the pace of the game. Notable celebrities joined include Hugh Jackman, Ellen DeGeneres, Steve Harvey, Jane Fonda and Lily Tomlin (as the cast of Grace and Frankie and, most lately, Keke Palmer.

One of the common gags said while playing nearly every interpretation of the game is Higgins saying to Fallon "This is not Charades, so don't cheat", referring to no-gesture rules of Password.

=== Catchphrase ===
Jimmy and one of The Roots or a celebrity guest each pair with another guest to play Catch Phrase. As with Password, Pictionary and Charades, one of the competitors is usually Questlove or Tariq. The game became common in 2021, and since then, it is played nearly every month. Notable competitors joining the game include Seth Meyers and Cobie Smulders (October 2021), Will Smith (December 2015), Evan Rachel Wood (June 2022) and John Krasinski (July 2022).

=== Box of Lies ===
Jimmy and a celebrity guest take turns picking from nine numbered boxes, which contain an obscure object (e.g. a Rubik's cube in a piece of gelatin.) They would then have to either lie or tell the truth about the object's description, while the other has to guess which is which. New interpretations of the game always use more complex objects in the boxes than the previous ones.

== Other segments featuring celebrity guests ==
=== Beer Pong ===
Jimmy plays the popular drinking game beer pong with a celebrity guest, those including Serena Williams, Ivanka Trump, Betty White, and John McEnroe. They play the paddle-less version ("Beirut"). The first player to sink two balls wins (increased to three balls when Jimmy played McEnroe). When Jimmy played Kathie Lee Gifford, they played the "classier" version "wine pong" using glasses filled with chardonnay. When Jimmy played Gina Gershon, they drank tequila shots instead of beer. When Jimmy played with Mariah Carey, they played "champagne pong" using glasses filled with Dom Pérignon rosé.

Current standings:

Contestant	W	L
Jimmy Fallon	18	15
Ivanka Trump	2	0
Candice Bergen	1	0
Mariah Carey	1	0
Jennifer Garner	1	0
Angie Harmon	1	0
Gina Gershon	1	0
Anna Kournikova	1	0
John McEnroe	1	0
Charlize Theron	1	0
Naomi Watts	1	0
Sigourney Weaver	1	0
Serena Williams	1	0
Chris Evans	1	1
Kathie Lee Gifford	1	1
Jessica Alba	0	1
Kate Bosworth	0	1
Salma Hayek Pinault	0	1
Kate Hudson	0	1
Lucy Liu	0	1
Helen Mirren	0	1
Paula Patton	0	1
Michelle Pfeiffer	0	1
Kelly Ripa	0	1
Maria Sharapova	0	1
Gabourey Sidibe	0	1
Sofia Vergara	0	1
January Jones	0	2
Betty White	0	2

=== Beer Shuffleboard ===
In a light-hearted attempt to reclaim the honor of his The Proposal co-star Betty White, who at the time was the only celebrity Jimmy had defeated in beer pong, Ryan Reynolds played Jimmy in a game of beer shuffleboard. The two later played another game after a dispute arose over an interpretation of the rules of the game.

=== Saved by the Bell / California Dreams Reunion ===
On the March 27, 2009 episode, Fallon explained that he had watched an episode of Saved by the Bell that morning. The episode he watched was The Prom, where Kelly opted to give the money she had saved to go to the prom with Zack to her father, who had just lost his job. Fallon commented on the absurdity of Kelly's father losing his job at a weapons plant because "world peace had broken out", and also pointed out that the year 2009 is the twentieth anniversary of Saved by the Bell. Fallon then decided to launch a campaign to persuade the original cast of Saved by the Bell to appear in a reunion special on his show. Dennis Haskins, who portrayed Mr. Belding, was the first to agree to take part in the reunion, and appeared on the show the same night Fallon launched the campaign. On April 3, 2009, it was announced that Lark Voorhees, who portrayed Lisa Turtle, would also be joining the reunion, making her the second Saved by the Bell guest. On April 24, 2009, Mario Lopez appeared on the show. After helping Fallon re-enact almost verbatim the climactic scene of the episode Save the Max in which the Saved by the Bell gang put together a pledge-drive to save The Max (altered to Late Night putting on a pledge drive to reunite the Saved by the Bell cast), he agreed to appear on the reunion.

On June 8, 2009, Mark-Paul Gosselaar appeared on the show as a guest to promote his series Raising the Bar. When he came out on stage, he was dressed as his Saved by the Bell character Zack Morris and claimed that since graduating college, he had been living in Los Angeles, working as an actor named Mark Paul Gosselaar because "there was already a Zack Morris in SAG". After agreeing to appear on the reunion, he received a phone call, on his signature oversized early-1990s–era cell phone, from Jessie Spano; Gosselaar then informed Fallon that Elizabeth Berkley had also agreed to appear on the reunion. At the end of his appearance, Gosselaar sang Friends Forever, a song performed by the Saved by the Bell gang's band Zack Attack. Fallon and The Roots also performed with him.

On March 4, 2010, Fallon said "it looks like the dream [of a reunion for Saved by the Bell] is over." However, on that night's show, he reunited the cast of the show California Dreams (which aired "right after Saved by the Bell" on NBC) instead. Dennis Haskins made a brief appearance, confusing the two reunions. California Dreams cast members Brent Gore (Matt Garrison), William James Jones (Tony Wicks), Heidi Noelle Lenhart (Jenny Garrison), Kelly Packard (Tiffani Smith), Jay Anthony Franke (Anthony Sommers), Jennie Kwan (Sam Wu), and Michael Cade (Sly Winkle) briefly discussed what they're doing now: Gore is working with a non-profit in Los Angeles, Jones is attending Pepperdine University in pursuit of a master's degree in clinical psychology, Lenhart is a mother of two, Packard is a mother of three and had a small part in the then-upcoming film My Girlfriend's Boyfriend, Franke is living in Australia with his wife and had recently finished filming a television pilot he created himself, Kwan (who became tongue-tied and blushed after being introduced) had toured with the traveling production of the musical Avenue Q and did a lot of voice acting (including the character Suki from the Nickelodeon animated series Avatar: The Last Airbender), and Cade works with the company Oxcyon and had a couple of films coming out that summer. The seven cast members then played the California Dreams theme song as the show went to commercial.

In February 2015, the Saved by the Bell cast was finally reunited (excluding Dustin Diamond and Lark Voorhies) and reprised their roles for a sketch which had Jimmy as a new student at Bayside High, and revealed Zack Morris had impregnated Kelly Kapowski (Tiffani Thiessen is pregnant in real life).

=== Random Object Three-Point Shootout ===
Jimmy and a celebrity guest take turns trying to make three-point shots on a basketball goal using objects like a telephone or a bowl of Count Chocula cereal.

=== Celebrity ===
Jimmy and a celebrity guest each pair with a member of the audience and play a game of Celebrity. The game is played in three rounds, each using 16 possible celebrity names as answers. During the first round, the clue-giver can give as much of a clue as they want. During the second round, the same set of names is used, but the clues are limited to three words. During the third and final round, the same names are used again, but the clue-givers may only use gestures (like in charades).

=== Space Train ===
While Jimmy is interviewing an actor, he casually mentions a mid-90s action film they were both in called Space Train (about people who have to save the Earth by going to outer space, but are afraid to fly, so they take a train into space). After the actor claims not to remember the movie, Jimmy shows a "clip" from the movie (acted out live by the two of them). Participating actors include Robert De Niro (on Late Night's first episode), Anna Faris, Ben Kingsley, Will Arnett, and Sir Richard Branson. Space Train is referenced in the ride experience of the theme park attraction Race Through New York Starring Jimmy Fallon at Universal Studios Florida in Orlando, in which Jimmy, aboard "The Tonight Rider" (a nod to Knight Rider) on the moon, uses a roller coaster launcher under construction called the Space Train to shoot him and the audience back to Earth.

=== The Sibling-wed Game ===
When Saturday Night Live writer/actor Seth Meyers appears as a guest, Jimmy will sometimes bring out Meyers' younger brother Josh and have them play a version of The Newlywed Game. Jimmy asks Seth a series of questions while Josh wears a pair of noise-canceling headphones, and then gets Josh to guess what Seth gave for answers. The brothers then switch positions, with Josh answering and Seth guessing.

=== Party Monkey Tic-Tac-Toe ===
Jimmy plays a game of tic-tac-toe with a celebrity guest that has them flinging slingshot "party monkeys" into buckets.

=== Water War ===
Jimmy plays a game of war with a celebrity in which the winner of each hand throws a glass of water on the loser. After one player uses five glasses, they earn the right to spray his opponent with a large water gun. He has played with Jason Statham, Christopher Meloni, Chris Kattan, Ashton Kutcher, Hugh Jackman, Jon Hamm, Tom Cruise, Ryan Reynolds, and Lindsay Lohan, among others.

=== Sticky Balls ===
Jimmy and a male guest each don a suit made of Velcro and throw small red balls at their opponent, trying to get the balls to stick to the suit. After 45 seconds, the balls are tallied and whichever person got more balls on their opponent's suit is declared the winner.

=== The Late Night Invitational ===
Jimmy plays a round of miniature golf in the studio and in the halls around the studio with a celebrity. To date, he has played with Billy Crudup, Will Arnett, Samuel L. Jackson, and Chris Rock.

=== Total Iceholes ===
Jimmy and a celebrity guest play an ice-fishing themed game of cornhole with beanbags shaped like fish and an ice-blue target platform. Three points are scored for a bag that goes in the hole, and 1 point for each bag remaining on the board at the end of the game. Each player has 5 bags to throw.

Player 1	Score	Player 2	Score
Jimmy Fallon	3	Drew Barrymore	3
Jimmy Fallon	10	Diane Lane	7
Jimmy Fallon	10	Rosario Dawson	4*
Jimmy Fallon	1	Winona Ryder	0
Jimmy Fallon	1	Miley Cyrus	9
Jimmy Fallon	3	Kirstie Alley	5
Jimmy Fallon	3	Marisa Tomei	10
Jimmy Fallon	10	Christina Ricci	0
Jimmy Fallon	2	Chloë Grace Moretz	3**
Jimmy Fallon	3	Kyra Sedgwick	1
Jimmy Fallon	2	Greg Kinnear	5
Jimmy Fallon	1	Serena Williams	1

*Dawson manually knocked some of her bags into the hole after the game, achieving a posted score of 16.
**Moretz walked over to the platform and dropped her last bag directly into the hole.

=== Horseshoes ===
Jimmy and Kid Rock played a game of horseshoes. Tariq served as judge. Later, Jimmy played Tim McGraw, with Higgins as judge.

Player 1	Score	Player 2	Score
Jimmy Fallon	1	Kid Rock	3
Jimmy Fallon	1	Tim McGraw	4

=== Ladder Toss ===
Jimmy and a guest (usually a female) play a game of ladder toss.

Player 1	Score	Player 2	Score
Jimmy Fallon	5	Mila Kunis	2
Jimmy Fallon	7	Martha Stewart	0
Jimmy Fallon	4	Julianne Hough	2

=== Random Instrument Challenge ===
Jimmy and a celebrity guest alternate playing simple songs (such as "She'll Be Coming 'Round the Mountain" or "Jingle Bells") on a randomly selected musical instrument that neither have any experience playing, trying to get The Roots to correctly guess what they were trying to play. If there are two celebrity guests, they will compete against each other. Originally, Jimmy and the celebrity would try to guess the songs each other played. The game was introduced to Jimmy by Julianna Margulies, who had played it at a birthday party for William H. Macy. Scarlett Johansson, Carrie Brownstein and Fred Armisen have also played it.

=== Let Us Play With Your Look ===
A sketch where Jimmy and a celebrity partner give a "makeover" to an audience member. Both Jimmy and the partner dress all in white, including blonde short-bobbed wigs, with Jimmy wearing a peasant shirt and tights. Jimmy sings "let us play with your look" over and over, rising in pitch until he gives out, while his partner makes over the audience member. The celebrity is the first guest later, and both Jimmy and the guest usually express wonder at who those two weird people were.

- Will Ferrell messily brushed an audience member's hair
- Alec Baldwin powdered an audience member's face
- Zach Galifianakis smeared a great deal of mousse into an audience member's hair
- Sarah Silverman smeared a facial mask cream on an audience member's face, in his hair, and on his clothes
- Drew Barrymore applied a large amount of hair gel in an audience member's hair; later, she got on a stationary bike and began pedaling as the bike was pulled off-screen
- Maya Rudolph put a large number of mismatched hair extensions in an audience member's hair; she then got on a mobility scooter and rode off backwards
- Don Cheadle emptied a can of mousse onto an audience member's head and then disappeared underneath Jimmy's desk
- Anne Hathaway spritzed water on an audience member's hair and combed it, and eventually just dumped the rest of the water on him; she then backed up and tumbled through the window behind Jimmy's desk
- Lindsay Lohan massaged shaving cream into an audience member's hair; Jimmy was dragged behind the curtain after giving out, and Lohan awkwardly hid in the folds of the curtain before eventually finding the part in the curtain. She did not appear later as a normal guest on the show.
- Bryan Cranston massaged large amounts of differently colored hair gels into an audience member's hair; afterwards, he put the lid of the mousse container over the audience member's head and then sashayed over to kiss Higgins on his way out

=== Jacob's Patience ===
Jimmy shows a scene from Jacob's Patience, a fictional 1990s Canadian soap opera he and his celebrity guest appeared on, where the actors used mannequin arms instead of their own.

- Will Ferrell appeared in a scene set in a sandwich shop
- Zach Galifianakis played a hustler in a billiards hall
- Alec Baldwin played a doctor giving Jimmy a medical exam (aired May 4, 2011)
- Chris Kattan played the proprietor of an ice cream shop making Jimmy a banana split
- Matthew Broderick played a taco shop owner making Jimmy a burrito (aired October 13, 2011)
- Ben Stiller played an Italian pizzeria owner making Jimmy a pepperoni pizza (aired June 8, 2012)
- Ricky Gervais was a pottery store owner giving Jimmy a lesson on a pottery wheel (aired September 26, 2012)
- Jason Bateman was the owner of a wine store
- Steve Carell and his assistant Justin Timberlake were men's clothiers fitting Jimmy for a suit (aired March 13, 2013)
- Seth Rogen was the owner of a Canadian weed store (aired June 11, 2013)
- Miley Cyrus was the owner of a nail salon giving Jimmy a manicure (aired October 8, 2013)

=== Other Voices ===
Jimmy plays a clip from Other Voices, a Canadian talk show airing at 3 AM he hosted, which featured his celebrity guest. Their dialogue is supplied off-screen and they must attempt to lip-sync along to it. The first installment featured Jimmy interviewing Steve Carell; Jimmy's dialogue was supplied by Higgins and Carell's was supplied by Chris Kattan. Later, when Jimmy interviewed Simon Cowell and Queen Latifah, Higgins and A. D. Miles supplied the dialogue. When Drew Carey appeared as a guest, in addition to Higgins and Miles providing their voices, Jimmy and Drew had people hiding behind them providing their arms. These are both sketches from Whose Line Is It Anyway?, the American version of which Carey hosted.

=== Ew! ===
Jimmy (as a teenage girl named Sara) and a female guest (or a male in drag) as one of her friends star in a fictional TeenNick show called Ew!, shot in the basement of Sara's house, in which they talk about things that make them say "Ew!". Sara always mentions how to spell her name: "And if you're wondering, that's S-A-R-A, with no H, because H's are ew!" Her nerdy stepdad Gary (played by A. D. Miles), whom she hates and is embarrassed by, always interrupts midway through the show, originally in person but more recently via FaceTime, since A. D. Miles left the show late March 2017.

The character of Sara is based on an actual girl named Sara in Jimmy's audience who loudly said "Ew!" after a disgusting joke during the July 15, 2011, edition of "Thank-You Notes". When Jimmy asked the girl her name, she answered, "Sara without an H." Jimmy saying "Ew!" in the style of Sara whenever something disgusting is mentioned during the regular show has also become a running gag.

==== "The Ew! Show" guests ====
In chronological order, the show has featured the following celebrities as Sara's friends for guests:

- Emma Stone played her friend Megan.
- Claire Danes played her friend Katie.
- Channing Tatum played her friend Susie Callahan.
- Michael Strahan played her friend Kelly Tompkins.
- Lindsay Lohan as her friend Stephanie Sullivan.
- On April 9, 2013, Sara went backstage at The Tonight Show to meet the Jonas Brothers, who played themselves (Sara is their number-one fan). After accidentally signing her poster over their faces, Sara was distraught and could be consoled only with a kiss from the Jonases. Before she could get her kiss, though, they were interrupted by Gary.

=== Shazazz ===
Whenever Gwyneth Paltrow is on, Jimmy mentions they were in a singing duo named Shazazz several years ago (either in the late 1980s or early 1990s). They go on to perform their top hits, originally in the style of old school rap: "Do It", "We're Gonna Do It", and "Remember When We Did It (The Reunion)". A later version had them switching genres to R&B and performing "Let's Do It", "Why Don't We Do It Again", and "We Did It".

=== Pleather and Lace ===
Jimmy reminisced with Liv Tyler about the time they appeared on Star Search in the 80s as the duo "Pleather and Lace", singing a cover of Cyndi Lauper's "All Through the Night". (The Star Search judges gave them ¼ stars.)

Later, the duo appeared on the (fictional) talent search show Star Makerz singing The Human League's "Don't You Want Me". The Star Makerz judges gave them ¼ Zs.

=== Pyramid ===
Higgins emcees a version of the classic game show Pyramid where Jimmy and a celebrity guest each pair with an audience member.

=== Mixology with Rachel Maddow ===
Whenever she is a guest on the show, Rachel Maddow, a self-proclaimed mixologist, makes Jimmy an obscure cocktail.

=== Hockey with Denis Leary ===
When he is a guest on the show, Denis Leary and Jimmy will usually play each other in a hockey-themed game, such as air hockey or "box hockey". They usually make a bet that the loser will donate money to the Cam Neely House for cancer patients in Boston.

=== Audience Skee Ball ===
Jimmy and a celebrity guest take turns rolling large, soft balls up a ramp into the audience, where audience members are holding bins and buckets labeled with different point values in a layout reminiscent of that used in a regular skee ball game.

Player 1	Score	Player 2	Score
Jimmy Fallon	100	James Franco	80
Jimmy Fallon	0	John Rich	60
Jimmy Fallon	150	Kristen Bell	140

=== The Long Pour ===
Jimmy and a celebrity guest attempt to pour three bottles of beer, one at a time, first into a mug and then from the mug into a large graduated cylinder. The pouring is complicated by a broomstick, both ends of which is affixed to their wrists, so that their arms are completely outstretched when attempting the pour from the bottle to the mug. The person with the most liquid in the cylinder at the end of the game wins.

=== Bow and Arrow Stand-Off ===
Jimmy and a celebrity guest each wear a clear plastic box around the upper half of their bodies. The box is divided into three zones: head, torso, and groin. Both of them are armed with a Nerf-style bow and suction-cup arrows. They stand approximately 15 feet apart and try to hit each other with the arrows. Five points are awarded for an arrow to the torso, ten for a head shot, and twenty for a hit in the groin area.

Player 1	Score	Player 2	Score
Jimmy Fallon	30	Jason Sudeikis	50
Jimmy Fallon	10	Robert Pattinson	25
Jimmy Fallon	30	Nathan Fillion	30
Jimmy Fallon	30	Ryan Lochte	25

=== Home Run Derby ===
Jimmy and a celebrity guest each hit large foam balls off a tee into the audience using a large plastic bat. The audience is divided into three scoring zones. Each player hits three balls (and sometimes also a final "superball" worth double points). Where the ball lands in the audience is how much it's worth. When playing against a British guest, they use cricket bats instead.

=== Rock, Paper, Scissors, Pie ===
Jimmy and a celebrity guest each put their arms and head through holes in stand-up pictures of chefs. In front of them is a pie-flinging machine. They then play rounds of rock-paper-scissors. Each time one of them loses a round, they click their machine one time. After a random number of clicks, the machine will propel the pie into their face (similar in concept to Russian roulette). The first person to take three (later reduced to two) pies to the face loses. One such guest was Glenn Close on June 5, 2013.

=== True Facts of Truth ===
Jimmy and a celebrity guest appear as disembodied heads in front of a tranquil background and recite not-quite-true facts like "George Washington's face appears on the quarter, the one-dollar bill, and Tobey Maguire's left butt cheek" while new age music plays in the background.

=== Egg Roulette ===
Jimmy and a celebrity guest take turns selecting an egg from a carton where 8 of the eggs have been hard-boiled and 4 have been left raw. While Jimmy and his guest sit on stools at a small, high table, Steve Higgins presents the egg carton with humorous but ominous remarks while explaining the rules. The contestants then take turns in choosing an egg from the carton and smash it against his forehead. The first person to smash two raw eggs on his head is the loser.

Guest players have included Jason Sudeikis (November 2012), David Duchovny (January 2013), Joel McHale (February 2013), Tom Cruise (April 2013), Seth Meyers (August 2013), and Edward Norton (October 2013). Most recent guests include Jane Fonda (July 2022) and Shawn Mendes (April 2022).

=== Yacht Rock ===
Once a year on the show, Jimmy has a "yacht rock" party, celebrating that genre of soft rock of the late 70s and early 80s. Jimmy will wear a captain's hat (and give out the hats to the audience) and have nautical-themed games. In addition, a yacht rock act will perform one of their hits of the genre:

- On October 5, 2009, Christopher Cross and Michael McDonald sang "Ride Like the Wind".
- On May 21, 2010, Robbie Dupree sang "Steal Away".
- On May 3, 2011, Ambrosia sang "Biggest Part of Me".

=== History of Rap in 3 Minutes ===
Whenever Justin Timberlake appears on the show, he and Jimmy perform a medley of popular hip-hop and rap songs from a 30-year span in (roughly) chronological order. Thus far, they have done six installments.

First Installment – 2010		Second Installment – 2011		Third Installment		Fourth Installment – March 2013		Fifth Installment – February 21, 2014		Sixth Installment – September 9, 2015	
Song	Artist	Song	Artist	Song	Artist	Song	Artist	Song	Artist	Song	Artist
"Rapper's Delight"	The Sugarhill Gang	"The Breaks"	Kurtis Blow	"King of Rock"	Run–D.M.C.	"Apache (Jump On It)"	The Sugarhill Gang	"I'm Bad"	LL Cool J	"Fiesta"	R. Kelly (featuring Jay Z)
"Peter Piper"	Run–D.M.C.	"The Message"	Grandmaster Flash and the Furious Five	"Mama Said Knock You Out"	LL Cool J	"White Lines (Don't Do It)"	Grandmaster Melle Mel	"Beats to the Rhyme"	Run-D.M.C.	"Rock the Bells"	LL Cool J
"Paul Revere"	Beastie Boys	"Express Yourself"	N.W.A	"Parents Just Don't Understand"	DJ Jazzy Jeff & The Fresh Prince	"Basketball"	Kurtis Blow	"Wait for the Beep"	Crazy Calls	"Friends"	Whodini
"Award Tour"	A Tribe Called Quest	"Bring the Noise"	Public Enemy	"Me Myself and I"	De La Soul	"Fat Boys"	The Fat Boys	"Fight for Your Right"	Beastie Boys	"La Di Da Di"	Slick Rick & Doug E. Fresh
"The Humpty Dance"	Digital Underground	"It Takes Two"	Rob Base and DJ E-Z Rock	"Supersonic"	J. J. Fad	"It's Tricky"	Run DMC	"Wild Thing"	Tone Loc	"Fight the Power"	Public Enemy
"Nuthin' but a 'G' Thang"	Dr. Dre (featuring Snoop Dogg)	"Push It"	Salt-n-Pepa	"Baby Got Back"	Sir Mix-A-Lot	"No Sleep Till Brooklyn"	Beastie Boys	"Fresh Prince Theme"	DJ Jazzy Jeff & The Fresh Prince	"Straight Outta Compton"	N.W.A
"California Love"	2Pac (featuring Dr. Dre and Roger Troutman)	"Ice Ice Baby"	Vanilla Ice	"Bust a Move"	Young MC	"Going Back to Cali"	LL Cool J	"What a Man"	Salt-N-Pepa	"Let's Talk About Sex"	Salt-N-Pepa
"Juicy"	The Notorious B.I.G.	"The Choice Is Yours (Revisited)"	Black Sheep	"Jump Around"	House of Pain	"Children's Story"	Slick Rick	"I Got a Man"	Positive K	"U Can't Touch This"	MC Hammer
"The Seed (2.0)"	The Roots (featuring Cody Chesnutt)	"Insane in the Brain"	Cypress Hill	"It Was A Good Day"	Ice Cube	"Me So Horny"	2 Live Crew	"Big Poppa"	Notorious B.I.G.	"Summertime"	DJ Jazzy Jeff & The Fresh Prince
"My Name Is"	Eminem	"Let Me Clear My Throat"	DJ Kool	"Gangsta's Paradise"	Coolio (featuring L.V.)	"Scenario"	A Tribe Called Quest	"Dre Day"	Dr. Dre feat. Snoop Dogg	"C.R.E.A.M."	Wu-Tang Clan
"Work It"	Missy Elliott	"Party Up (Up in Here)"	DMX	"Killing Me Softly"	Fugees	"Hand on the Pump"	Cypress Hill	"Regulate"	Warren G feat. Nate Dogg	"Mo Money Mo Problems"	Notorious B.I.G. (feat. Puff Daddy & Mase)
"Crank That (Soulja Boy)"	Soulja Boy Tell 'Em	"Hot in Herre"	Nelly	"Sabotage"	Beastie Boys	"Rump Shaker"	Wreckx-N-Effect	"Straight Outta Compton"	N.W.A.	"Informer"	Snow
"Live Your Life"	T.I. (featuring Rihanna)	"In da Club"	50 Cent	"I Just Wanna Love U (Give It 2 Me)"	Jay Z (featuring Pharrell Williams & Omillio Sparks)	"Shoop"	Salt N Pepa	"Here Comes the Hotstepper"	Ini Kamoze	"Country Grammar"	Nelly
"Gold Digger"	Kanye West	"Hey Ya!"	Outkast	"Ms. Jackson"	Outkast	"Gin and Juice"	Snoop Doggy Dogg	"So Fresh, So Clean"	Outkast	"Crossroads"	Bone Thugs-n-Harmony
"Empire State of Mind"	Jay Z (featuring Alicia Keys)	"A Milli"	Lil Wayne	"Drop It Like It's Hot"	Snoop Dogg (featuring Pharrell)	"Woo-Hah!! Got You All in Check"	Busta Rhymes	"Pass the Courvoisier"	Busta Rhymes (featuring P Diddy & Pharrell)	"Ignition (Remix)"	R. Kelly
		"All I Do Is Win"	DJ Khaled	"Stronger"	Kanye West	"Hypnotize"	The Notorious B.I.G.	"Jump"	Kris Kross	"Look at Me Now"	Chris Brown (featuring Lil Wayne & Busta Rhymes)
		"Teach Me How to Dougie"	Cali Swag District	"Super Bass"	Nicki Minaj	"Get Ur Freak On"	Missy Elliott	"I Wish"	Skee-Lo	"Bitch Don't Kill My Vibe"	Kendrick Lamar
		"B.M.F. (Blowin' Money Fast)"	Rick Ross	"Hip Hop Hooray"	Naughty by Nature	"Izzo (H.O.V.A.)"	Jay Z	"99 Problems"	Jay Z	"Know Yourself"	Drake
		"Just A Friend"	Biz Markie			"Ride Wit Me"	Nelly	"Move Bitch (Get Out the Way)"	Ludacris	"I Don't Fuck With You"	Big Sean
						"P.I.M.P."	50 Cent	"Started From the Bottom"	Drake	"Otis"	Jay Z and Kanye West
						"Ridin'"	Chamillionaire	"Swimming Pools (Drank)"	Kendrick Lamar	"My Way"	Fetty Wap
						"Black and Yellow"	Wiz Khalifa	"Good Life"	Kanye West (featuring T-Pain)	"Bugatti"	Ace Hood (featuring Future and Rick Ross)
						"All Gold Everything"	Trinidad James	"Walk This Way"	Run-D.M.C.	"Fight for Your Right"	Beastie Boys
						"Thrift Shop"	Macklemore and Ryan Lewis				
						"Lose Yourself"	Eminem				

=== Pool Bowling ===
A game of pool played on a giant billiard table with bowling balls and no cues. The first person to sink three balls, stripes or solids, wins.

=== Beer Hockey ===
In this hybrid of beer pong and air hockey, at each end of the table are seven holes with cups full of beer in them. If your opponent succeeds in scoring the puck by sinking it in one of your cups, you must chug, then turn the cup upside down and place it on top of the hole. First player to score three wins.

=== Lip Sync Battle ===
Jimmy and a celebrity guest take turns lip syncing to popular music. The segment was spun off into its own reality competition show on Spike (later Paramount Network).

=== Lip Flip ===
Jimmy and a celebrity guest have their mouths superimposed on each other and take turns voicing each other.

=== Flip Cup ===
A game of flip cup.

- March 5, 2014: Annette Bening

=== ___ Scooter Race ===
Jimmy and a celebrity guest race each other on scooters one lap outside Studio 6-B through holiday-themed obstacle courses.

=== The Evolution of ___ Dancing ===
In a parody of the viral video hit "The Evolution of Dance", Jimmy and First Lady Michelle Obama performed "The Evolution of Mom Dancing", a series of such dance moves as "The 'Go Shopping, Get Groceries'", "The 'Raise the Roof'", "The 'Sprinkler'", "The 'Just The Hands Part of Single Ladies'", "The 'Where's Your Father? (Get Him Back Here!)'", "The 'Pulp Fiction'", "The 'Out of Sync Electric Slide'", and "The 'Dougie'". The sketch was in honor of Mrs. Obama's "Let's Move!" campaign to end childhood obesity.

Later, Jimmy and Justin Timberlake performed "The Evolution of End Zone Dancing", featuring some real touchdown dances like the "'Ickey Shuffle'" and "The 'Dirty Bird'", as well as other dances, such as "The 'Touchdown Robot'", "The 'Old-Timey Railroad Car'", "The 'Earthquake Waiter'", "The 'I Thought I Just Saw Aaron Hernandez'", "The 'Football Spin' (Into The Love Scene From "Ghost")", and "The 'Justin Timberlake' (From 'N Sync)" (the last of which mock-infuriated Timberlake, causing him to shove Jimmy and leave the set).

Then there was an edition which featured Jimmy and New Jersey Governor Chris Christie performing "The Evolution of Dad Dancing".

== One-time sketches involving celebrity guests ==
=== Thanksgiving ===
In this sketch, aired on Nov. 22, 2009, guest Blake Lively and Jimmy play each other, reminiscing about their previous Thanksgiving Dinners. It is shown through flashbacks that each Thanksgiving both Blake and Jimmy bring the same food item or dish. Blake, enraged, slaps Jimmy. At the last Thanksgiving shown neither bring out a food dish, however Blake becomes enraged anyway when she and Jimmy break the wishbone from the turkey and he gets the bigger half.

=== Pumpkin Bowling ===
On Halloween 2011, Jimmy and Heidi Klum bowled two frames apiece using pumpkins of various sizes instead of bowling balls. Klum beat Jimmy 19–18.

=== Relationship with Stephen Colbert ===
After Stephen Colbert auctioned off a portrait of himself "enhanced" by artists Shepard Fairey and Andres Serrano for the charity DonorsChoose, he declared on his show, The Colbert Report, that his "BFF for six months," Jimmy Fallon, was going to match the auction price, $26,000. On the next night's Late Night, Fallon demurred, saying, "here's the thing: I never said that." Hearing that, Colbert came out on the Late Night stage and chided him, saying, "if you can't donate $26,000 of your best friend's money without asking him first, what's the point in being best friends?" In quasi-retaliation, Fallon announced that if his viewers would donate the $26,000 to DonorsChoose, Colbert would appear with the Roots to sing Rebecca Black's "Friday". (Fallon claimed he couldn't match the amount himself due to his money "being tied up in Soul Patrol Sweatshirts".) The viewers met the donation goal (as of April 2, 2011, 2,026 donors had pledged $63,902), with NBC Universal also matching the $26,000, and Colbert, along with Fallon, Black Thought, Taylor Hicks, and the New York Knicks City Dancers, performed the song on the April 1, 2011 show. During the performance, Seth Herzog held up a large placard with a QR code on it; the code led to a "secret" video where Jimmy thanked his viewers for their donations.

In a later segment of The Colbert Report, Colbert noticed that NBC used a picture of the "Friday" performance in Late Night's Emmy packet, and pointed out the irony of doing so since Fallon and Colbert would be up for Emmys in the same category. Colbert then did a "Thank You Note" to Jimmy for promoting his show. On a later episode of Late Night, Jimmy wanted to remain "fremmymies" (a portmanteau of "friend" and "Emmy") rather than "emmymies" and countered with his version of Colbert's "The Wørd" (which included "Who are we kidding – neither of us is gonna beat Jon Stewart"); the show then went to commercial with the logo Late Night with Jimmy Falbert.

When the six months was up, the pair became mortal enemies and went on each other's shows to feud. Anderson Cooper appeared on both sketches (claiming Italian restaurant Sbarro gives out free tickets to both shows when you buy a slice of pizza) asking each host if he could be their new friend, to which both replied "No, Anderson, it's just too soon!"

=== Who's on First? ===
On December 20, 2012, Jimmy and Higgins did a version of the classic Abbott and Costello bit "Who's on First?" with Jimmy in the Bud Abbott role and Higgins in the Lou Costello role. During the bit, Billy Crystal appeared as the first baseman (Who), A. D. Miles was the second baseman (What), and Jerry Seinfeld played the third baseman (I Don't Know).

=== Jimmy and Will Smith's 1920s radio show ===
On May 24, 2012, Jimmy and Will Smith played their grandfathers, who had a music show on the old NBC Radio Network in the 1920s, and they show some old archived clips of them performing. However, all of the songs they performed were simply crooner-style versions of Smith's old songs, who claims they sound nothing like his music.

=== Tight Pants ===
On May 10, 2012, Will Ferrell hosted. He emerged from the curtains dancing and singing about his white "tight pants". In this sketch that was the most popular among fans, "All of a sudden, Fallon crashed the party with his own tight pants, which did not sit well with Ferrell — who claimed he was the only one who could wear tight pants." The skit was re-run on Fallon's Best of Late Night special (2014).

=== Point Pleasant Police Department ===
Jimmy shows a "clip" from a TV show in the 1980s he and a celebrity guest starred in together, in which play officers from the Point Pleasant, New Jersey Police Department, who repeatedly spit food on each other (acted out live by the two of them).

== Other sketches ==
=== March Madness picks ===
Each year for March Madness, Jimmy picks an underdog team he thinks will go all the way. His correct-incorrect ratio was 1–3; his first 3 picks lost in the first round, but his 2013 pick actually made the Final Four.

In 2009, Jimmy threw all of his support behind the Tennessee-Chattanooga Mocs, who were seeded #16 and played the heavy favorite, #1 seeded Connecticut Huskies in the first round. Jimmy made signs for the audience to hold up, gave them T-shirts, had their pep band play on the show, did a brief history of the school, and did an interview via satellite with Head Coach John Shulman. He also reviewed a list of notable graduates, which includes Dennis Haskins (most known as Mr. Belding from the TV series Saved by the Bell) who made an appearance on stage in support of his alma mater and gave Jimmy a UTC hat. However, the show's support wasn't enough, as the Mocs lost the game 103–47. Coach Shulman and the outgoing senior players attended the March 20th taping of the show as audience members and Jimmy had a brief conversation with the coach during the show.

In 2010, Jimmy picked the Siena Saints. He said he wanted to pick his hometown school. He once again did a school history and reviewed a list of notable graduates, which also includes his sister Gloria. The Roots then performed a ballad about head coach Fran McCaffery. The #13 seed Saints lost in the first round to the #4 seed Purdue Boilermakers 72–64. As a tribute to the team, Jimmy read off the Siena roster and had the audience twirl Saints T-shirts.

In 2011, Jimmy picked the #15 seed Long Island-Brooklyn Blackbirds who played the #2 seed North Carolina Tarheels in the first round. To celebrate, Fallon gave the entire audience Long Island-Brooklyn basketball T-shirts. Later, the Roots sang a song about the LIU head coach Jim Ferry, described by Jimmy as "the sexiest coach in the NCAA", and then Jimmy gave the entire audience Blackbirds thundersticks. LIU's mascot also appeared during Cell Phone Shootout the day before the first game to give high fives to the audience. Jimmy's pick once again didn't make it past the first round, losing 102–87.

Late Night was in reruns the week before the tournament in 2012, so no underdog pick was made that year; however, Jimmy did a Pros and Cons sketch about March Madness upon his return.

In 2013, Jimmy's team was the #4 seed Syracuse Orange, his first pick to have a higher seed than their first-round opponent. Jimmy gave a special shout-out to Syracuse sophomore forward Rakeem Christmas (whom, Jimmy points out, wears number 25 on his jersey). After Syracuse won their first game (81–34 over the #13-seed Montana Grizzlies), Jimmy gave one lucky audience member a bowl of oranges, which he elected to trade for a "mystery prize": a sack of oranges. After Syracuse won their second game (66–60 over the #12-seed California Golden Bears) Jimmy gave out another bowl of oranges, which was traded for a citrus juicer. Syracuse's third game was a 61–50 win over the #1-seed Indiana Hoosiers, but fell during a long weekend. After Syracuse won their fourth game (a 55–39 win over the #3-seed Marquette Golden Eagles), Jimmy gave out another bowl of oranges, which were traded for a gift-wrapped bowl of oranges. Jimmy wanted to show a clip from their Elite Eight Victory, but CBS wouldn't allow it, so they re-created one using an Atari 2600 basketball game. Syracuse was finally defeated in the Final Four by Michigan on April 6.

=== April Fool's Day pranks ===
As an April Fool's Day prank in 2009, Yoshi Amao came out and did the entire monologue in Japanese (with subtitles) instead of Jimmy.

In 2010, most of the band was shown lounging instead of playing the theme song during the introduction (the music was pre-recorded) while keyboardists James Poyser and Kamal Gray had a pretend boxing match.

In 2011, the band briefly played the theme song intentionally poorly and Questlove's drumming "stepped on" Tariq's announcing of the episode number. Shortly thereafter, Questlove announced "April Fools!" They finished the theme song as normal.

In 2012, April 1 fell on a weekend.

=== If Puppies Could Vote/Puppy Predictors ===
In the run-up to the 2010 midterm elections, Jimmy had five Golden Retriever puppies with human first and last names (Roger Blain, Brian Johnson, Kyle McAdams, Lisa Armstrong, and "troublemaker" Gary Frick) act as "pundits" to predict the winner of various races by choosing which of two bowls of dog food to eat from (blue for the Democrat and red for the Republican). After he briefly went through the candidates' positions, he released the puppies from a small cage. The puppies selected:

- in the Nevada Senate race: Harry Reid, 4–1 over Sharron Angle.
- in the Illinois Senate race: Mark Kirk, 3–2 over Alexi Giannoulias.
- in the Pennsylvania Senate race: Joe Sestak, 3–2 over Pat Toomey.
- in the New York Governor's race: the original call was Carl Paladino 3–2 over Andrew Cuomo, but a review of the tape revealed one puppy (Gary Frick) had "controversially" flip-flopped and changed his vote, giving Cuomo the victory.

The puppies correctly called three of the four races, only missing in the Sestak/Toomey race in Pennsylvania.

After the election, an "attack ad" ("paid for by cats") surfaced slamming Gary Frick for his flip-flop in the Cuomo/Paladino race.

In a final bipartisan effort, he rewarded the puppies for their work by letting them eat out of a single bowl.

Jimmy also had the puppies predict the Best Picture winner of the 83rd Academy Awards. They incorrectly predicted Toy Story 3 (The King's Speech was the actual winner).

Jimmy later had the puppies predict the results of the 2011 NFL season. They incorrectly selected the New England Patriots to be the winners of Super Bowl XLVI. The Patriots did make it to the Super Bowl, but lost to the New York Giants by the score of 21–17.

On the February 24, 2012 episode, Jimmy had the puppies predict the Best Picture winner of the 84th Academy Awards. They incorrectly predicted The Tree of Life (The Artist was the actual winner).

The night before the 2012 U.S. presidential election, Jimmy allowed Gary Frick (whom Jimmy has adopted as his own pet) to select the winner. She (Gary Frick is actually a female dog) incorrectly picked Mitt Romney as the winner (Barack Obama was re-elected).

On the January 30, 2013 episode, as part of an "Audience Suggestion Box" segment, Jimmy had the puppies predict the winner of Super Bowl XLVII. They correctly selected the Baltimore Ravens over the San Francisco 49ers (the final score was 34–31).

On the February 20, 2013 episode, Jimmy had the puppies predict the Best Picture winner of the 85th Academy Awards. They correctly predicted Argo. (Gary Frick did not appear in this segment; she was replaced by Barry Frick, whose relation to Gary, if any, is not yet known.)

On April 12, 2013, a puppy incorrectly picked Wichita State to win the 2013 NCAA Men's Division I Basketball Tournament (even though the show's pick was Syracuse, who also didn't win—that honor went to Louisville (though their title was later vacated due to NCAA sanctions levied in response to the 2015 University of Louisville basketball sex scandal). The selection method was different for this prediction: each of the four puppies wore the jersey of a different team and the first one that reached the food bowl indicated the prediction.

On May 3, 2013, Jimmy had one puppy (Barry Frick) predict the winner of the 2013 Kentucky Derby. Barry incorrectly predicted Verrazano, who came in 14th place; Orb was the winner.

On September 4, 2013, as part of an "Audience Suggestion Box" segment, Jimmy had the puppies predict the winner of the NFL season opener between the Baltimore Ravens and the Denver Broncos. They predicted Denver. The puppies were correct when the Broncos, led by Peyton Manning, did win.

=== Harry Potter Super Fan Contest ===
Jimmy brought down two self-professed fans of the Harry Potter series and had them compete at a series of contests to try to win a prize package provided by Warner Brothers.

- Bean Taste Test: Contestants attempt to identify one of Bernie Bott's Every Flavor Beans ("rotten egg" and "vomit") by taste for one point.
- Guess the Title: Jimmy read the name of on the Harry Potter films as translated into a foreign language (Harry Potter und die Kammer des Schreckens) that the contestants had to identify for one point.
- Repeat After the Living Painting: Jimmy brought out a "living painting" (Mike Dicenzo) who recited a recipe for Dragon Dung Fertilizer that the contestants had to remember and write down later, earning one point for each correct ingredient.

Because the contestants were tied after round 3, they went to a tiebreaker, where they had to chug a pint of butterbeer as quickly as possible.

The winner's prize was a three-day trip for two to London, staying at a four-star hotel, and the winner would film a Harry Potter movie scene. The loser received a Late Night T-shirt.

=== The Twelve Things of 2010 ===
Jimmy and a choir of the show's staff sang a song about the twelve biggest news stories of 2010, to the tune of "The Twelve Days of Christmas". The sketch returned in 2011 as the "Late Night Topical Carolers".

=== Target Demographic ===
In Target Demographic, Jimmy details a very specific type of viewer which is attractive to advertisers due to their excessive wasteful spending on material goods. The first version was "Blonde Connecticut Housewives". The segment has also examined "Jersey Shore D-Bags" (actual residents of the area, not cast members of the MTV reality show), "Indian Doctors", and "Balds". This sketch was only done in the early days of the show and has seemed to be retired.

=== University of Oregon Power Ballad ===
Leading up to the 2011 BCS National Championship Game between the Auburn Tigers and the Oregon Ducks, Jimmy noted that, while most schools have school fight songs, no school has a school power ballad. After some deliberation as to which of the championship teams to choose, he decided to create one for Oregon, "We are the Ducks", which was performed by former Skid Row lead singer Sebastian Bach.

=== Pro Bowl Shuffle ===
Jimmy and the show's staff, plus Will Arnett and Horatio Sanz, did a parody of "The Super Bowl Shuffle" called "The Pro Bowl Shuffle".

Jimmy played New England Patriots quarterback Tom Brady, Arnett played Minnesota Vikings quarterback Brett Favre, Sanz played Pittsburgh Steelers strong safety Troy Polamalu, Bashir Salahuddin played Philadelphia Eagles quarterback Michael Vick, and A.D. Miles played New York Giants quarterback Eli Manning. In non-speaking roles, Owen Biddle played Dallas Cowboys quarterback Tony Romo, Questlove played Detroit Lions tackle Ndamukong Suh, Damon Bryson played Eagles wide receiver DeSean Jackson, Kamal Gray played Baltimore Ravens linebacker Ray Lewis, with unidentified gentlemen playing Cowboys tight end Jason Witten and Chicago Bears defensive end Julius Peppers.

Black Thought played Tennessee Titans running back Chris Johnson, Captain Kirk Douglas played Giants wide receiver Steve Smith, F. Knuckles played New Orleans Saints running back Reggie Bush, with an unidentified gentleman playing Green Bay Packers quarterback Aaron Rodgers, even though those four players were not named to the 2011 Pro Bowl at the time (Johnson later made the Pro Bowl as a replacement for injured Houston Texans running back Arian Foster).

=== Mad Libs Twas the Night Before Christmas ===
Jimmy enlisted the help of Zac Efron, Jesse Eisenberg, Howie Mandel, Jack McBrayer, Patton Oswalt, Maya Rudolph, Jason Segel, Martin Short, T.I., and Brian Williams to recite a shortened version of the poem A Visit From St. Nicholas in a Mad Libs fashion.

'Twas the night before Christmas, when all thro' the house
Not a creature was stirring, not even a Swiffer (Mandel);
The stockings were hung by the chimney with care,
In hopes that Rod Carew (Oswalt) soon would be there;
The children were nestled all snug in their beds,
While visions of sweet and sour shrimp (T.I.) danc'd in their heads,
And Mama in her performance fleece (Eisenberg), and I in my cap,
Had just settled our brains for a long winter's crap (McBrayer) —
When out on the lawn there arose such a caw (Short),
I sprang from the bed to see what it be (Williams).
Away to the window I flew like a virgin (McBrayer),
Tore open the shutters, and threw up all over my new loafers (Williams).
When, what to my wondering eyes should appear,
But a '71 Gremlin (Oswalt), and eight sexy (Segel) ferrets (T.I.),
With a little old driver, so sloppy (Efron) and quick,
I knew in a moment it must be Herbert Hoover (Rudolph).
More rapid than yogurt tubes (Oswalt) his coursers they came,
And he sneezed (Williams), and he pooped (Rudolph), and call'd them by name:
"Now! Dasher, now! Spanky (Short), now! Gertie (McBrayer) and Vixen,
"On! Fallopia (Rudolph), on! Charles Barkley (T.I.), on! Mucus Legs (Oswalt) and Blitzen;
His eyes — how they twinkled! His nipples (McBrayer): how merry,
His cheeks were like squishy (Oswalt) birds (T.I.), his breasts (Short) like a cherry;
He had a broad face, and a stanky (Williams) hot (Rudolph) belly
That shook when he diddled (McBrayer), like a bowl full of hot sauce (T.I.):
And laying his weird sucker pads (Oswalt) aside of his spicy butt (Rudolph)
And giving a squash (Efron), up the ding-dong (Short) he wiped (Williams).
But I heard him exclaim, ere he drove out of sight —
Happy (Efron) Christmas (Eisenberg) to (T.I.) all (McBrayer), and (Oswalt) to (T.I.) all (Short) a (Mandel) dried penis (Rudolph).

=== 2012 Democratic National Convention ===
During the week of the 2012 Democratic National Convention, Jimmy opened each show with an impression of a speaker from the previous night at the convention: San Antonio mayor Julian Castro, former president Bill Clinton, and singer James Taylor (singing a parody of "Fire and Rain" about the DNC and RNC).
