= List of Siena University (Loudonville, New York) alumni =

This is a list of notable graduates of Siena University in Loudonville, New York.

== Notable alumni ==
=== Academics ===
- Steven Lamy, professor of international relations and vice dean for the College of Letters, Arts, and Sciences at the University of Southern California
- Wolf Wolfensberger, professor who influenced disability policy and practice

=== Arts and literature ===
- Janek Ambros, film director, writer and producer
- William J. Kennedy, 1984 Pulitzer Prize for Fiction winner
- Wendy Moniz, television actress
- Len Roberts, poet
- Ron Vawter, actor and a founding member of the Wooster Group

=== Government ===
- Francis Bergan, former presiding justice of the New York Court of Appeals
- Michael Botticelli, former director of the Office of National Drug Control Policy
- Charles R. Boutin, member of the Maryland House of Delegates
- Anthony Brindisi, class of 2000, United States representative from New York, 22nd Congressional District of New York from 2019 to 2021
- Constantine George Cholakis, former judge of the United States District Court for the Northern District of New York
- Mae D'Agostino, United States district judge for the United States District Court for the Northern District of New York
- Michael Dempsey, acting director of National Intelligence, Deputy DNI for Intelligence Integration
- George Deukmejian, 35th governor of California
- Michael C. Finnegan, former counsel to the governor of New York during the George Pataki Administration
- Chris Gibson, former United States representative
- Wayne LaPierre, gun rights advocate; executive vice president and CEO of the National Rifle Association
- John McEneny, member of the New York State Assembly and Albany County historian
- Jack Quinn, former United States representative from New York; president of Erie Community College
- Gerald B. H. Solomon, former United States representative from New York
- Henry F. Zwack, justice of the New York Supreme Court, 3rd Judicial District

=== Journalism ===
- Jack Cashill, author and journalist
- Erich Hartmann, international award-winning photojournalist; former president of Magnum Photos
- David Hepp, journalist and creator of Inside Albany

=== Religion ===
- Harry Flynn, archbishop emeritus of Saint Paul and Minneapolis
- Roberto González Nieves, archbishop of San Juan

=== Sports ===
- Matt Brady, coach of several men's college basketball teams
- Tim Christman, Major League Baseball relief pitcher
- Marcus Faison, professional basketball player
- Matt Gage, Major League Baseball pitcher with the Toronto Blue Jays
- Mary Grimes, college basketball coach
- Jeff Hafley, National Football League head coach
- Billy Harrell, Major League Baseball infielder
- Kenny Hasbrouck, professional basketball player
- Gary Holle, Major League Baseball first baseman
- John Lannan, Major League Baseball pitcher
- Michael E. Long, men's basketball coach at the College of Saint Rose
- Jack McClinton, professional basketball player
- Elisa Mevius, German basketball player and Olympic gold medalist in 3x3 basketball
- Jalen Pickett, professional basketball player
- Charlie Taaffe, football coach at the University of Central Florida
- Edwin Ubiles, professional basketball player

=== Fiction ===
- Olivia Benson, the main character in the long-running NBC police procedural Law & Order: Special Victims Unit, attended Siena College.
