= Michael E. Long =

American basketball player and coach

Mike Long (born October 13, 1946 in Albany, New York) is an American basketball coach and former basketball player. He is currently the head men's basketball coach at Hudson Valley Community College. In November 2019, he won his 500th career game. He has been inducted into four different Halls of Fame: The College of Saint Rose Hall of Fame (April 1992), Bishop Maginn High School (Former Vincentian Institute) Athletics Hall of Fame (May 2006), and the NYS Basketball Hall of Fame (June 2010) alongside Capital District coaching legend Doc Sauers. In September 2019, he was inducted into the Sage Colleges Athletic Hall of Fame. He was also honored as a Distinguished Alumnus of Siena University in 2022.

== Youth ==
Growing up in Menands, New York, Long's primary sport as a child was baseball and while playing Little League on one occasion pitched a perfect game, striking out all 18 batters to face him. When he reached high school, Long went to Vincentian Institute, a co-ed private school located in the Pine Hills neighborhood of Albany, NY.

== Playing career ==
At V.I, Long lettered in both basketball and baseball. After his senior year, Long decided to attend Siena College. He played as a guard-forward who stood 6'1". Long was a prolific scorer and rebounder for Siena. Because freshmen at the time were not allowed to play varsity sports, he played for the freshman team his first year. After moving up to varsity sophomore year, he instantly became the team's "go-to guy". He came down with mono his junior season, which sidelined him for a few games that year. Nevertheless, he scored 862 career points. He possessed an outstanding shooting touch in an era before the three-point line came into existence. If it had been in use during Long's playing career, and if freshmen were allowed to play varsity at the time and he didn't miss significant time due to illness, one could imagine that scoring total might have been over 1,000. In his senior year, he led the team in scoring with 462 total points for an average of 18.5 per game, both of which still rank in the top 20 single-season scoring annals at the college. That year, he also averaged 8.2 rebounds, which ranks in the top 15 in school annals for rebounds per game. During his senior year, Long scored 35 points in one game, which is the 10th-highest single game point total in Siena history.

== Coaching career at Siena and St. Rose ==
Long served in the Army during Vietnam and upon return obtained the JV coaching job in 1972 at his alma mater, Siena College. He led his team to a 10–10 record in his only season at the school. At the start of the 1973 season, Long was named head men's basketball coach at The College of Saint Rose, taking control of the reigns for the Golden Knights inaugural season. His first team there went 5-15 and the next year there weren't enough players to have a season.

It took Long three years to get his team to over .500 (they went 6–15 in 1975/76 and 11–13 in 1976/77), when the team went 14–10 in 1977/78, winning its first NAC title. The next three years were very successful (22–5, 23–6, 16–12), bringing the school three additional Northern Athletic Conference championships.

During his 12 seasons as head coach at St. Rose, he amassed a 166-155 record and 5 NAC championships, including two undefeated seasons in conference play. Long was inducted into The College of Saint Rose Athletic Hall of Fame in 1992. He is affectionately nicknamed "The Father of Saint Rose Basketball" and on November 15, 2008, the court at the college was named in his honor.

== At Sage-JCA ==
From 1986-1990, Long served as assistant at Sage Junior College of Albany to Bill Toomey. Toomey left JCA after the 1989/1990 season, and Long took over as head coach. Over his first three years at JCA, the team went 42–37. The two years that followed were highly successful. His team would go 23–7 in 1993/94 and 19–9 in 1994/95, led by Chad Thomas, who would later go on to start at the University of Rhode Island. Thomas still holds many season and career records at JCA, including career points with 1,229, single season points with 638, career steals with 230, single season steals with 121, and highest scoring average with 23.6 points per contest.

After the 1998/99 season, the school entered the NJCAA Division II. The decision to switch was a good one as the team finished as the #1 seed for the Region 3 tournament in 1999/00 and went 19–9 in 2000/01 and advanced to the semi-finals of the NJCAA Division II Region III tournament. At one point during the season, the Sabres were ranked as high as #15 in the nation.

The 2001/2002 season was the most successful season the school, and Long, ever had. The team went 27-4, losing all four games by no more than seven points, again advancing to the NJCAA Division II Region III tournament, and winning Long Region III Coach Of The Year award. The team was nationally ranked the whole season, reaching #8 at its highest point.

The school disbanded all of its athletic programs after the 2002/2003 season, one in which Long guided his team to a 19–9 record and a finish in the semi-finals of the NJCAA Division II Region III tournament. Long finished his 13-year career at JCA with a 222–142 record and numerous post season appearances.

== The transition ==
Following his career at JCA, Long went to Christian Brothers Academy in Albany, New York) to help out with the varsity boys basketball team. During his three years as an assistant coach and primary defensive coordinator, the team was one of the best defensive teams in the state, winning three consecutive Section II titles and finishing in the NYS semi-finals two of those three years.

== A return home ==
In the summer of 2006, Long was asked to go back to Saint Rose as an assistant under former player Brian Beaury. Long accepted and became the interim head coach in December, when Beaury was forced to take a medical leave. At the time, the team was 2-2. Long guided the team to a 19-8 record, 17-6 with Long as head coach, before Beaury came back to direct Saint Rose through the Northeast-10 conference tournament and into the NCAA's.

== HVCC ==
On August 12, 2013, Long was named as the Head Men's Basketball Coach at Hudson Valley Community College in Troy, NY upon the departure of former coach Ken Dagostino, who left to coach at NAIA school Ave Maria. This appointment came ten years after his last head coaching job. After winning his first two games, the Vikings dropped their next two. On December 8, 2013, the Vikings beat Corning Community College, improving their record on the season to 4-3 and giving Long his 400th career victory as a collegiate head coach.

The Vikings started the 2014-2015 season (Long's second year) with a 5-0 record, the best start since the 2008-2009 season when they won the Region III, Division III Championship. They finished the year at 15-13.

Long's third season at HVCC (2015-2016) started with a 4-game winning streak for the 2nd straight season, including a pair of 40-point blowout victories. In the 5th game of the season taking on Herkimer, who was ranked 5th in the country, the Vikings trailed by 18 at the half and rallied to lead by 2 with five minutes left before falling by 7. Through 19 games, the Vikings record stood at 12-7, but thanks to an 8-2 finish they ended the regular season at 20-9. They went on to lose a nail biter to Mohawk Valley in the regional quarterfinals to finish the season at 20-10. Due to the team exceeding expectations, Long was selected as both Mountain Valley Conference and NJCAA Region 3 Coach of the Year. He was also selected as Region 3 Division 3 Coach of the Year and was awarded the Paul F. Bishop Coach of the Year, which is give annually to the best coach in the Athletic Department at HVCC.

After beginning the 2016-2017 season 1-4, the Vikings responded with a 16-4 mark over their next 20 games, including a pair of 6-game win streaks. The final record for the season was 18-11.

After a 4-12 start to the 2017-2018 season, the Vikings won 8 of their last 11 games, including a major upset over the then ranked #2 team in the nation, Herkimer, to finish the season 12-15. Long was nominated for both Region and Conference Coach of the Year Awards. Despite not receiving these awards, it is considered his best coaching performance at Hudson Valley.

The 2018-2019 team was very highly touted, especially after routing eventual national champion Herkimer in an early season matchup by a score of 102-72, Herkimer's only loss on the season. The game was never really close and garnered HVCC much publicity, with many calling them the best team in the country. When the first national rankings were released, HVCC was ranked 5th. After losing two of their starting five at the break, they would eventually fall to 10th and then out of the final rankings. They went on to lose in the quarter-final round of the NJCAA Region 3 Tournament to Mohawk Valley, the nations 2nd highest ranked team. Their final record was 21-8. Point guard Caleb Canty set a school record for most 30-point games in a season and guard Brandon DeGrasse closed out his career within the school's top 10 in assists, rebounds, and steals. Forward O'Nandi Brooks garnered First Team All Region and First Team All Conference selections and Long was nominated for Region and Conference Coach of the Year for the fourth consecutive season, joining Herkimer's Matt Lee and Mohawk Valley's Matt St. Croix as the only coaches to be nominated in more than two consecutive years.

For the 6th time in 7 years, HVCC won their season opener for 2019-2020, as well as their home opener on November 8, 2019 which was also Long’s 100th win at the helm. On November 16, the Vikings came from down 15 with under 8 minutes left and 7 with just a little over a minute left to beat Rockland CC in overtime by a score of 103-93, giving Long 500 career victories as a college head coach. HVCC secured the 4 seed and a first-round bye in the 2020 NJCAA Region 3 tournament and beat Corning in the quarterfinals 91-66, marking the first time in a decade that HVCC made it to the Region 3 semi-finals. The Vikings lost to the second nationally ranked team, Mohawk Valley, in the NJCAA Region 3 Final Four to end their season at 23-8.

The 2020-2021 season was cancelled due to the COVID-19 pandemic. During the 2021-2022 season, the Vikings started out 6-5, but won 10 of their next 11. They finished the season with a final record of 16-7. During the season, Mike Long became the second all-time winningest coach in HVCC history.

The 2022-2023 season saw the Vikings sweep the season series against Herkimer for the first time in over a decade, and they were winners of their first 5 games against nationally ranked opponents, including back-to-back wins over Corning and Genessee, who were both ranked in the top 5 at the time. Trevor Green won National Player of the Week after recording a triple double against Genessee, as the Vikings burst into the national rankings and would see themselves ranked as high as 6 nationally. They earned a first round bye for the NJCAA Region 3 tournament and beat Herkimer in the quarter finals. They would go on to lose to Mohawk Valley in the semi-final round to finish the year 17-10. Trevor Green finished his career 4th all time in HVCC's scoring records and become only the 5th player to reach the 1,000 point plateau.

The 2023-24, 2024-25, and 2025-2026 seasons were tough ones highlighted by Long becoming the all-time winningest coach at HVCC, establishing him as the all-time leader in coaching wins at two different schools. The 2023-2024 and 2024-25 seasons were also highlighted by the emergence of Keyaton Parks. Parks averaged a double-double both years, was the nations leader in double-doubles, broke and set numerous single game rebounding records, and became the all-time leader for career rebounds.

At the onset on the 2026-27 season, Long is 14 wins from the 600-win milestone.

== AAU ==
In 1999, Long was persuaded by a friend to take the helm of an AAU team he wanted to create for his son. The Helderberg Hoopers were a 12 and under AAU basketball team which played its home games at Sage Junior College of Albany and the Albany College of Pharmacy. With each passing year, the Hoopers moved up in age level so that it could maintain the original roster. After several roster changes in 2000, the Hoopers roster remained intact for three years, winning a multitude of tournaments each season. Long continued to coach the Hoopers while at CBA, but had to stop coaching them after the 2006 season because of NCAA recruiting restrictions.

== All-time records ==
School	Wins	Losses	Year
Siena	10	10	1971/1972
St. Rose	5	15	1973/1974
St. Rose	6	15	1975/1976
St. Rose	11	13	1976/1977
St. Rose	14	10	1977/1978
St. Rose	22	5	1978/1979
St. Rose	23	6	1979/1980
St. Rose	16	12	1980/1981
St. Rose	16	14	1981/1982
St. Rose	11	17	1982/1983
St. Rose	17	14	1983/1984
St. Rose	11	17	1984/1985
St. Rose	14	17	1985/1986
Sage-JCA	19	10	1986/1987^
Sage-JCA	11	14	1987/1988^
Sage-JCA	16	10	1988/1989^
Sage-JCA	19	9	1989/1990^
Sage-JCA	11	15	1990/1991
Sage-JCA	14	11	1991/1992
Sage-JCA	17	11	1992/1993
Sage-JCA	23	7	1993/1994
Sage-JCA	19	9	1994/1995
Sage-JCA	16	14	1995/1996
Sage-JCA	19	11	1996/1997
Sage-JCA	13	13	1997/1998
Sage-JCA	14	13	1998/1999
Sage-JCA	11	16	1999/2000*
Sage-JCA	19	9	2000/2001
Sage-JCA	27	4	2001/2002
Sage-JCA	19	9	2002/2003
Christian Brothers	24	2	2003/2004^
Christian Brothers	22	3	2004/2005^
Christian Brothers	23	4	2005/2006^
St. Rose	22	10	2006/2007^
St. Rose	23	8	2007/2008 ^
St. Rose	11	17	2008/2009 ^
St. Rose	16	12	2009/2010^
St. Rose	22	9	2010/2011^
St. Rose	7	19	2011/2012^
St. Rose	16	14	2012/2013^
HVCC	12	13	2013-2014
HVCC	15	13	2014-2015
HVCC	20	10	2015-2016
HVCC	18	11	2016-2017
HVCC	12	15	2017-2018
HVCC	21	8	2018-2019
HVCC	23	8	2019-2020
HVCC	16	7	2021-2022
HVCC	17	10	2022-2023
HVCC	9	18	2023-2024
HVCC	13	14	2024-2025
HVCC	10	18	2025-2026

Head Coaching Records:

Siena: 10-10 St. Rose: 166-155 Sage-JCA: 222-142 HVCC: 186-145**

  - As of 9/23/26

*In 1999/2000, Long was not notified that a player was ineligible, and he was forced to forfeit five wins. *In 2016-2017, a bench clearing altercation against Columbia-Greene forced the forfeiture of two games. ^Denotes seasons as assistant coach.

== Accolades ==
- 9 regular season conference titles
- 4 conference tournament titles
- NAC Coach of the Year (1979,1980)
- NJCAA Region III, Division II Coach of the Year (2002)
- Mountain Valley Conference Coach of the Year (2016)
- NJCAA Region III Coach of the Year (2016)
- Paul F. Bishop Coach of the Year (2016)
- Bishop Maginn High School Hall of Fame (2006)
- College of Saint Rose Athletic Hall of Fame (1992)
- Upstate New York Basketball Hall of Fame (2010)
- Sage Colleges Athletic Hall of Fame (2019)
- Distinguished Alumnus of Siena University
- Sam Perkins Sportsmanship Award (2013)
- 586-467 career won/loss record as head coach
- 407-287 NJCAA career won/loss record

Updated 3/2/24
