= Shortlist Music Prize =

Annual American award for albums

- Awarded for: Best album released in the United States that has sold fewer than 500,000 copies
- Location: United States
- Presented by: Short List
- First award: 2001
- Final award: 2007 (currently on hiatus)

The Shortlist Music Prize was an annual music award for the best album released in the United States that had sold fewer than 500,000 copies at the time of nomination. First given as a cash prize in 2001 under the name Shortlist Prize for Artistic Achievement in Music, the award was created by two music industry directors, Greg Spotts and Tom Serig, as an alternative to the commercial Grammy Awards. The recipient is chosen by a panel of entertainment industry members and journalists known as the "Listmakers". Over 50 of the best albums of the previous 12 months are picked before being narrowed down to the eponymous Shortlist, from which a winner is chosen. Since 2003, a gold statuette, nicknamed "The Shorty", has been given out in conjunction with the cash prize. In 2005, the Shortlist Music Prize was renamed the New Pantheon award for a year following a dispute between the prize's founders. No nominees or winners have been announced since the presentation of the 2007 award.

Modeled on the British Mercury Prize, the Shortlist Music Prize was conceived to honor "the most adventurous and creative albums of the year across all genres of music". At the end of 2001, Icelandic post-rock band Sigur Rós became the first recipients following a ceremony at the Hollywood Knitting Factory. Virgin Megastores sponsored the award during the inaugural year. The Shortlist Music Prize's format continued in similar fashion the following years, but at different venues. Tower Records opened an online store for the award, which included CD samplers of each year's nominated acts. The majority of the seven winners so far have been singer-songwriters: Irishman Damien Rice won in 2003, Americans Sufjan Stevens and Cat Power were successful in 2005 and 2006, respectively, and Canadian Feist won in 2007. Three winning albums eligible at the time of nomination—N.E.R.D's In Search of..., Rice's O, and Feist's The Reminder—went on to sell over 500,000 copies in the United States and achieved gold certification. N.E.R.D received the accolade between the time of nomination and the award ceremony.

The Shortlist Music Prize quickly became an anticipated event and a coveted award. It provided an artistic and independent music focus in contrast to the Grammys' major label or chart rankings affiliations. The 2003 and 2004 Shortlist Music Prize ceremonies were shown on MTV2 in recorded format. In 2005, Sarig started using the New Pantheon name after co-founder Spotts left to focus on politics. The 2005 award ceremony was pushed back from the end of the year to March 2006 to coincide with the Grammys; it was eventually canceled because of "logistical reasons" and winner Stevens was given his prize informally. After threatening legal action for the continuation of the Short List brand under the New Pantheon guise, Spotts returned and purchased both trademarks, uniting the two titles under the Shortlist Music Prize. The award ceremony continued to be held in the early part of years until the last given prize for 2007.

== Winners and shortlisted nominees ==
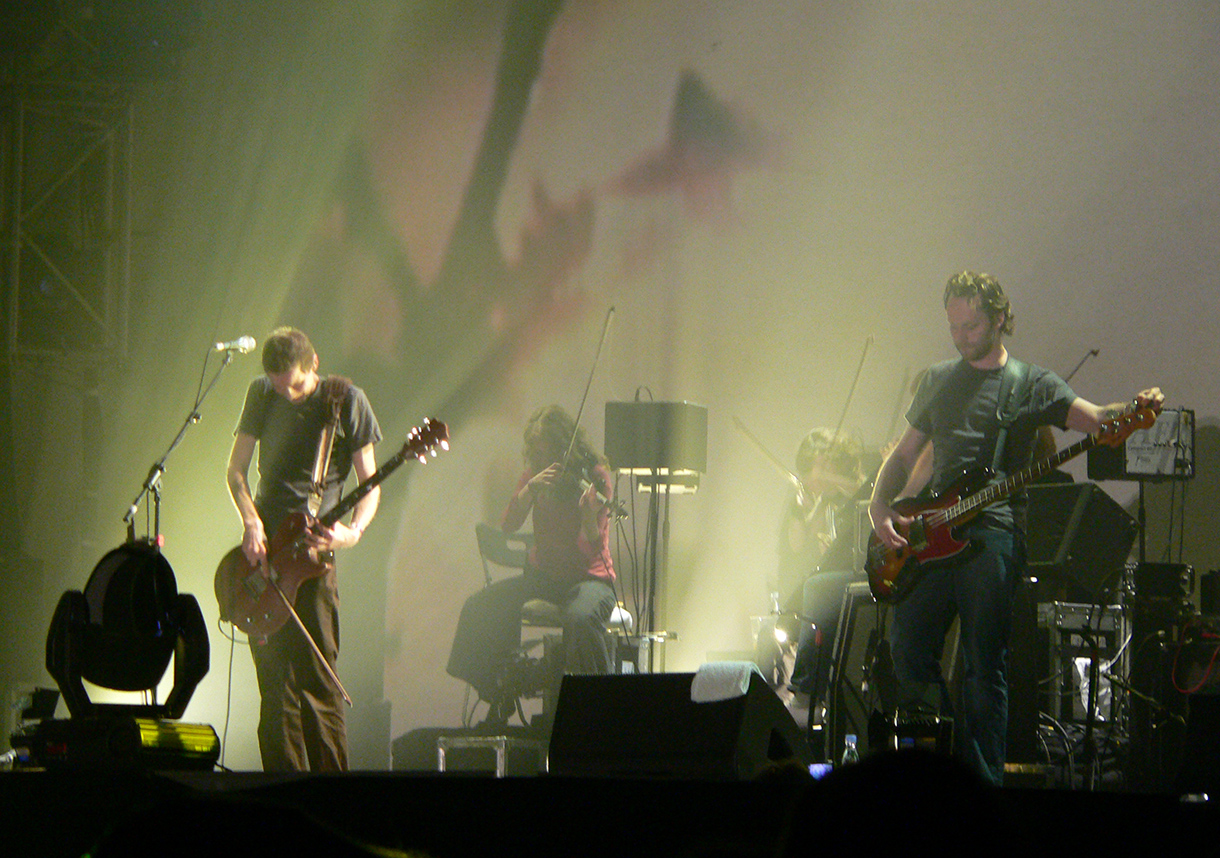
2001 winner, Sigur Rós

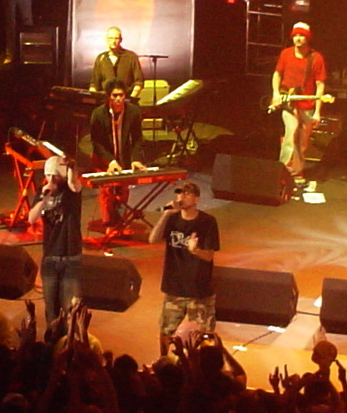
2002 winner, N.E.R.D

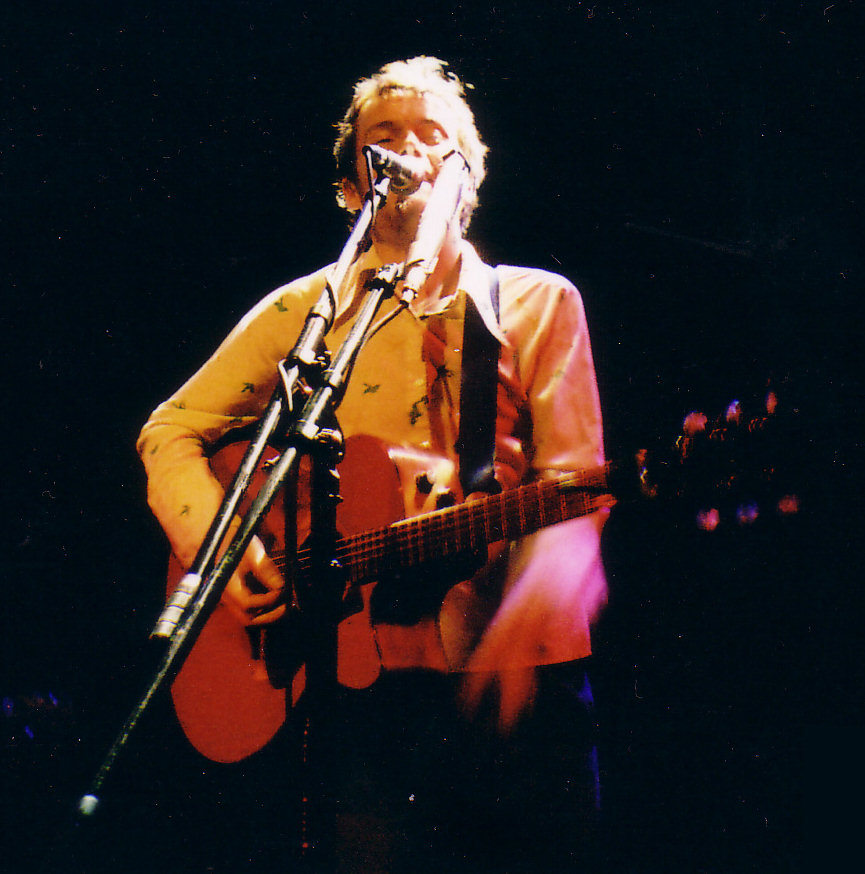
2003 winner, Damien Rice

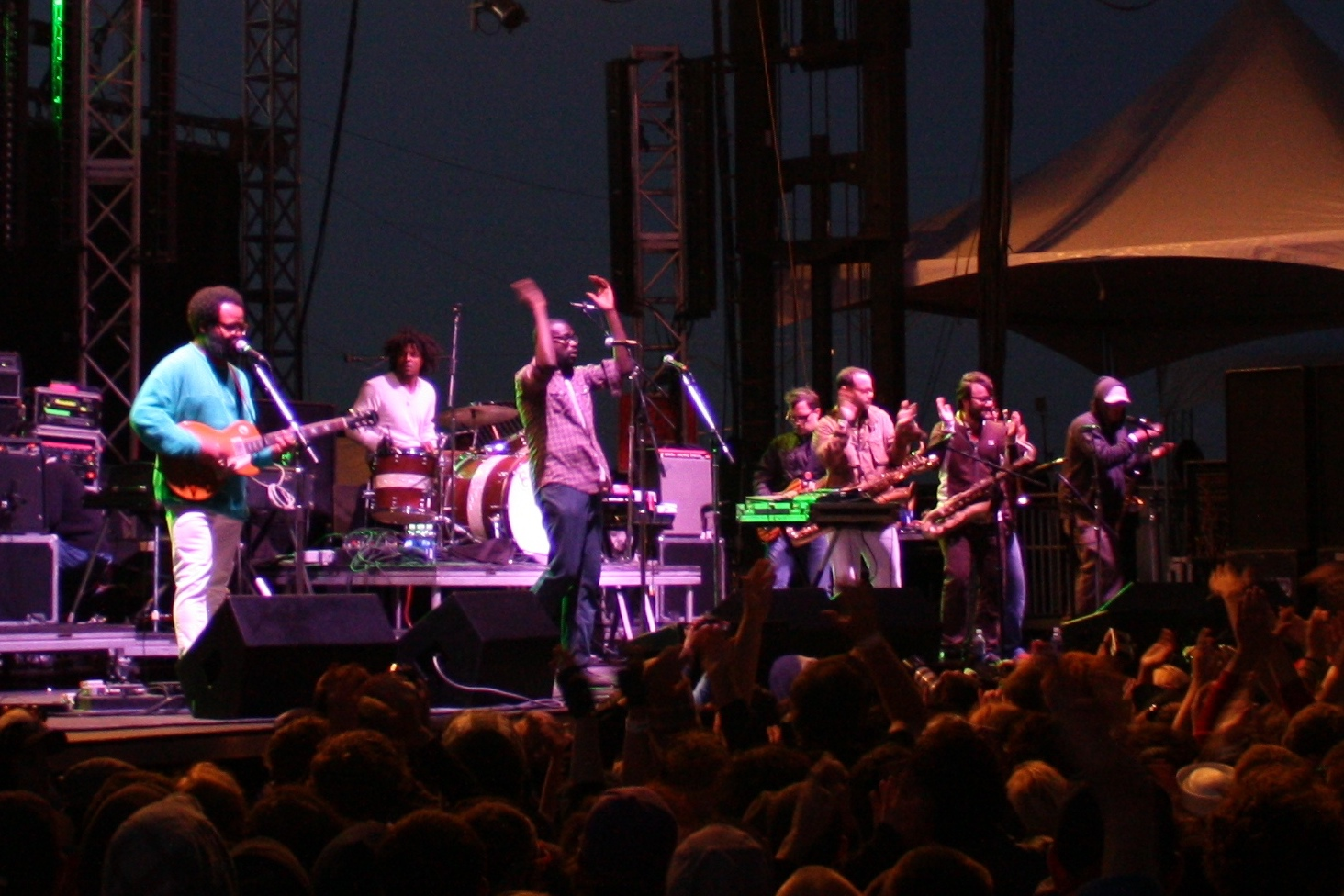
2004 winner, TV on the Radio

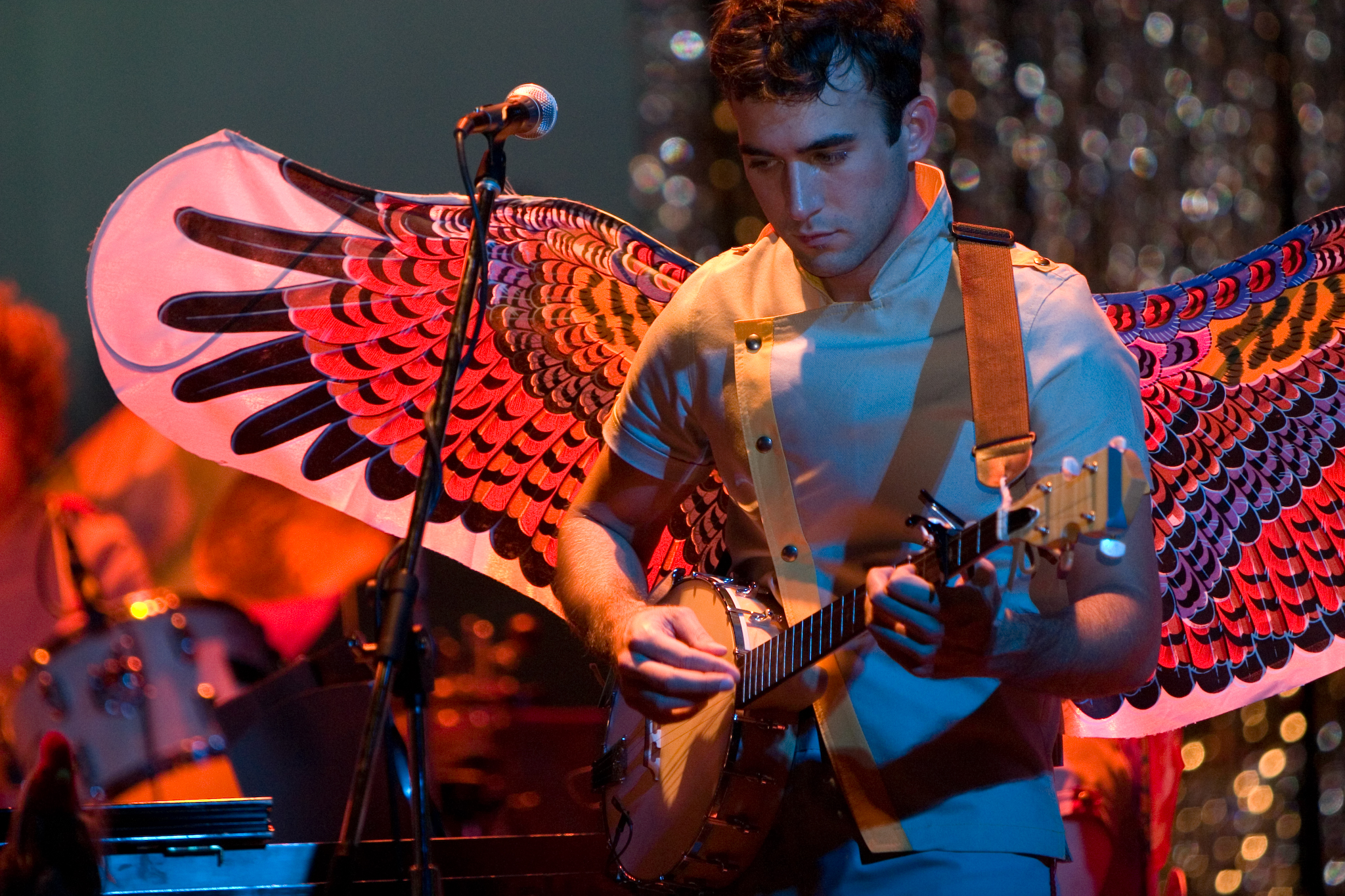
2005 winner, Sufjan Stevens

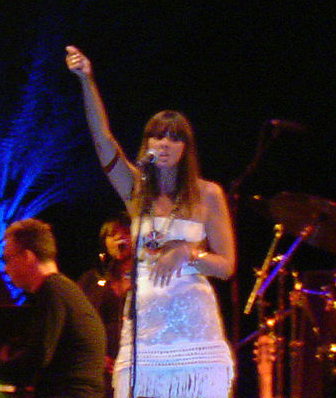
2006 winner, Cat Power

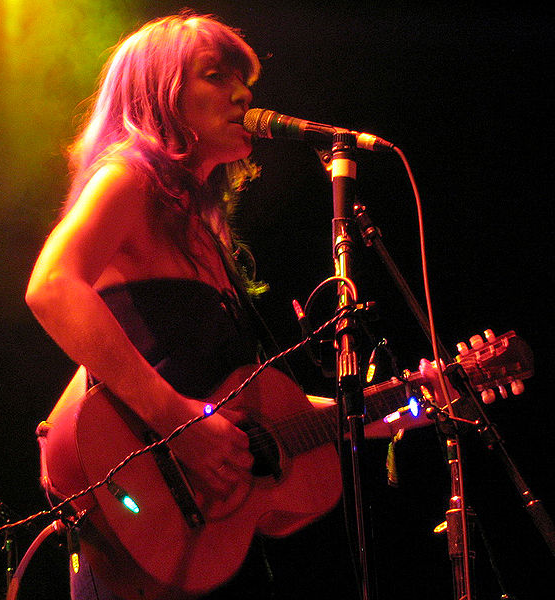
2007 winner, Feist

Year	Winner	Album	Shortlisted nominees and albums	Refs
2001	Sigur Rós	Ágætis byrjun	Ryan Adams – Heartbreaker; Bilal – 1st Born Second; Nikka Costa – Everybody Got Their Something; The Dandy Warhols – Thirteen Tales from Urban Bohemia; Gorillaz – Gorillaz; PJ Harvey – Stories from the City, Stories from the Sea; Jay Dee – Welcome 2 Detroit; Talib Kweli & Hi-Tek – Reflection Eternal	
2002	N.E.R.D	In Search of...	Aphex Twin – Drukqs; The Avalanches – Since I Left You; Björk – Vespertine; Cee-Lo – Cee-Lo Green and His Perfect Imperfections; DJ Shadow – The Private Press; Doves – The Last Broadcast; The Flaming Lips – Yoshimi Battles the Pink Robots; The Hives – Veni Vidi Vicious; Zero 7 – Simple Things	
2003	Damien Rice	O	The Black Keys – Thickfreakness; Bright Eyes – Lifted or The Story Is in the Soil, Keep Your Ear to the Ground; Cat Power – You Are Free; Cody ChesnuTT – The Headphone Masterpiece; Floetry – Floetic; Interpol – Turn On the Bright Lights; Sigur Rós – ( ); The Streets – Original Pirate Material; Yeah Yeah Yeahs – Fever to Tell	
2004	TV on the Radio	Desperate Youth, Blood Thirsty Babes	Air – Talkie Walkie; Buckethead – Bucketheadland 2; Dizzee Rascal – Boy in da Corner; Franz Ferdinand – Franz Ferdinand; Ghostface Killah – The Pretty Toney Album; The Killers – Hot Fuss; Loretta Lynn – Van Lear Rose; Nellie McKay – Get Away from Me; Wilco – A Ghost Is Born	
2005	Sufjan Stevens	Illinois	Animal Collective – Feels; Antony and the Johnsons – I Am a Bird Now; Fiona Apple – Extraordinary Machine; Arcade Fire – Funeral; Bloc Party – Silent Alarm; Death Cab for Cutie – Plans; The Decemberists – Picaresque; Kings of Leon – Aha Shake Heartbreak; M.I.A. – Arular	
2006	Cat Power	The Greatest	Band of Horses – Everything All the Time; Beirut – Gulag Orkestar; Bonnie 'Prince' Billy – The Letting Go; Girl Talk – Night Ripper; Hot Chip – The Warning; Joanna Newsom – Ys; Regina Spektor – Begin to Hope; Spank Rock – YoYoYoYoYo; Tom Waits – Orphans: Brawlers, Bawlers and Bastards	
2007	Feist	The Reminder	Arcade Fire – Neon Bible; Burial – Untrue; Justice – †; LCD Soundsystem – Sound of Silver; M.I.A. – Kala; Spoon – Ga Ga Ga Ga Ga; Robert Pollard – Standard Gargoyle Decisions; Stars – In Our Bedroom After the War; Wilco – Sky Blue Sky; Working for a Nuclear Free City – Businessmen & Ghosts	

== See also ==
- Mercury Prize (UK)
- Australian Music Prize (Australia)
- Choice Music Prize (Ireland)
- Polaris Music Prize (Canada)
- Prix Constantin (France)
- Nordic Music Prize (Nordic countries)
