= MTV2 Award =

Annual music video award

The MTV2 Award was first presented at the MTV Video Music Awards in 2001. The category recognized the best videos to have premiered and/or got their start on MTV's sister channel, MTV2. Much like the Viewer's Choice award, the MTV2 Award was also fan-voted. Until 2005, the award was considered to be one of the main awards of the night, even being presented on the main show; in 2006, though, the MTV2 Award was relegated to being handed out during a commercial break of the MTV2 simulcast of the VMAs. The following year, as the VMAs were revamped, the MTV2 Award was eliminated and subsequently never brought back.

== Recipients ==
Year	Winner	Other nominees
2001	Mudvayne – "Dig"	Craig David – "Fill Me In"; Gorillaz – "Clint Eastwood"; India.Arie – "Video"; Jurassic 5 – "Quality Control"; Alicia Keys – "Fallin'"
2002	Dashboard Confessional – "Screaming Infidelities"	The Hives – "Hate to Say I Told You So"; Norah Jones – "Don't Know Why"; Musiq – "Halfcrazy"; Nappy Roots (featuring Jazze Pha) – "Awnaw"; The Strokes – "Last Nite"
2003	AFI – "Girl's Not Grey"	Common (featuring Mary J. Blige) – "Come Close"; Interpol – "PDA"; Queens of the Stone Age – "No One Knows"; The Roots (featuring Cody Chesnutt) – "The Seed (2.0)"
2004	Yellowcard – "Ocean Avenue"	Elephant Man – "Pon Di River"; Franz Ferdinand – "Take Me Out"; Modest Mouse – "Float On"; Twista (featuring Kanye West and Jamie Foxx) – "Slow Jamz"; Yeah Yeah Yeahs – "Maps"
2005	Fall Out Boy – "Sugar, We're Goin Down"	Akon (featuring Styles P) – "Locked Up"; The Bravery – "An Honest Mistake"; Daddy Yankee – "Gasolina"; Mike Jones (featuring Slim Thug and Paul Wall) – "Still Tippin'"; My Chemical Romance – "Helena"
2006	Thirty Seconds to Mars – "The Kill"	Lil Wayne – "Fireman"; Taking Back Sunday – "MakeDamnSure"; Three 6 Mafia (featuring Young Buck, 8Ball and MJG) – "Stay Fly"; Yung Joc (featuring Nitti) – "It's Goin' Down"
