= Working for a Nuclear Free City (album) =

Studio album by Working for a Nuclear Free City
- Released: 18 September 2006
- Genre: Alternative rock
- Length: 41:13
- Label: Melodic

Working for a Nuclear Free City chronology
Working for a Nuclear Free City (2006)	Businessmen & Ghosts (2007)

Professional ratings
Review scores
Source	Rating
AllMusic	4/5 stars
Pitchfork	7.8/10

Working for a Nuclear Free City is the debut album by Manchester (United Kingdom) indie band Working for a Nuclear Free City. The album was not released in the United States but all its tracks were included on their next release, the double album Businessmen & Ghosts. Their song "Dead Fingers Talking" was used in the first episode of the show Breaking Bad.

== Production ==
The writing for self-titled as well as their subsequent release, Businessmen & Ghosts, was made up of songs that were made since the band formed in 1999 with about 80 or so tracks being written.

Before writing officially began, Phil Kay used to make hip-hop beats by himself for a few years. Eventually, he moved on to making “weird soundtrack-like pieces” before later applying a more guitar based sound to his work with Gary. Soon vocal tracks were later added and they would also begin to incorporate various genres into their writing such as electronica, krautrock, shoegaze and neo-psychedelia beyond their initial atmospherics.

Production took place in various locations with “each place [having] its own different influence on [them].” Songs were written rather quickly with specific musical influences switching from one day to another. The album would still be described as being very "together" in a BBC interview.

When asked about how the audience would react to the album, McClure would respond with “I have no idea. We really have lost all track of people and music at the moment. We really isolated ourselves making this album, and we are finding it hard to re-adjust.”

== Track listing ==
All tracks are written by Phil Kay, Gary McClure, Ed Hulme, Jon Kay.

No.	Title	Length
1.	"The 224th Day"	1:34
2.	"Troubled Son"	2:45
3.	"Dead Fingers Talking"	3:38
4.	"Pixelated Birds"	1:39
5.	"Quiet Place"	4:39
6.	"Quiet Place"	3:17
7.	"England"	1:09
8.	"Over"	3:44
9.	"So"	4:09
10.	"Innocence"	4:12
11.	"Home"	1:32
12.	"Fallout"	1:53
13.	"Forever"	4:37
14.	"The Tree"	2:33
Total length:		41:13

== Personnel ==
Note that “Dekko” is Phil Kay

- Dekko – vocals, keyboards, production (all tracks)
- Jon Kay – drums, percussion
- Gary McClure – guitar, bass
- Ed Hulme – vocals, guitar, bass

== Television placements ==
Multiple songs from this album would have placements in various shows. The song "Rocket" would also be in the 2009 film Push and "Troubled Son" was put in the international trailer for the 2010 film Green Zone.

Song	Show	Season	Episode	Title	Original release date
Dead Fingers Talking	Breaking Bad	1	1	"Pilot"	January 20, 2008
Kingdom	Waterloo Road	4	13	"Episode 13" (untitled)	April 1, 2009
Troubled Son	CSI: NY	4	10	"The Thing About Heroes"	November 28, 2007
