= The Headphone Masterpiece =

Studio album by Cody Chesnutt
- Released: September 2002
- Studio: Home recording (credited as "The Sonic Promiseland") in Valley Village, California
- Genre: Neo soul; lo-fi; alternative R&B; soul
- Length: 98:10
- Label: Ready Set Go!
- Producer: Cody Chesnutt

Cody Chesnutt chronology
The Headphone Masterpiece (2002)	Black Skin No Value (2010)

The Headphone Masterpiece is the debut album by American singer-songwriter and multi-instrumentalist Cody Chesnutt, released in 2002. It was recorded in his home bedroom with a 4-track recorder and Chesnutt playing guitar, bass, keyboard, and the organ. A 36-song double album, The Headphone Masterpiece features neo soul and lo-fi music, and distorted, overdubbed production. It was written and arranged by Chesnutt, whose mix of ironic and sincere lyrics reflect on personal experiences such as falling in love with his wife and reconciling his love for rock and roll with the drawbacks to the rock lifestyle.

After unsuccessfully shopping the album to record companies, Chesnutt distributed it himself on his website before releasing it again through his own label Ready, Set, Go! on September 24, 2002. The album charted for one week on the Billboard 200, reaching 25,000 copies sold by March 30, 2003, according to Nielsen SoundScan. Critically, it was well received, with reviewers generally finding the music adventurous, even if indulgent.

== Recording and production ==
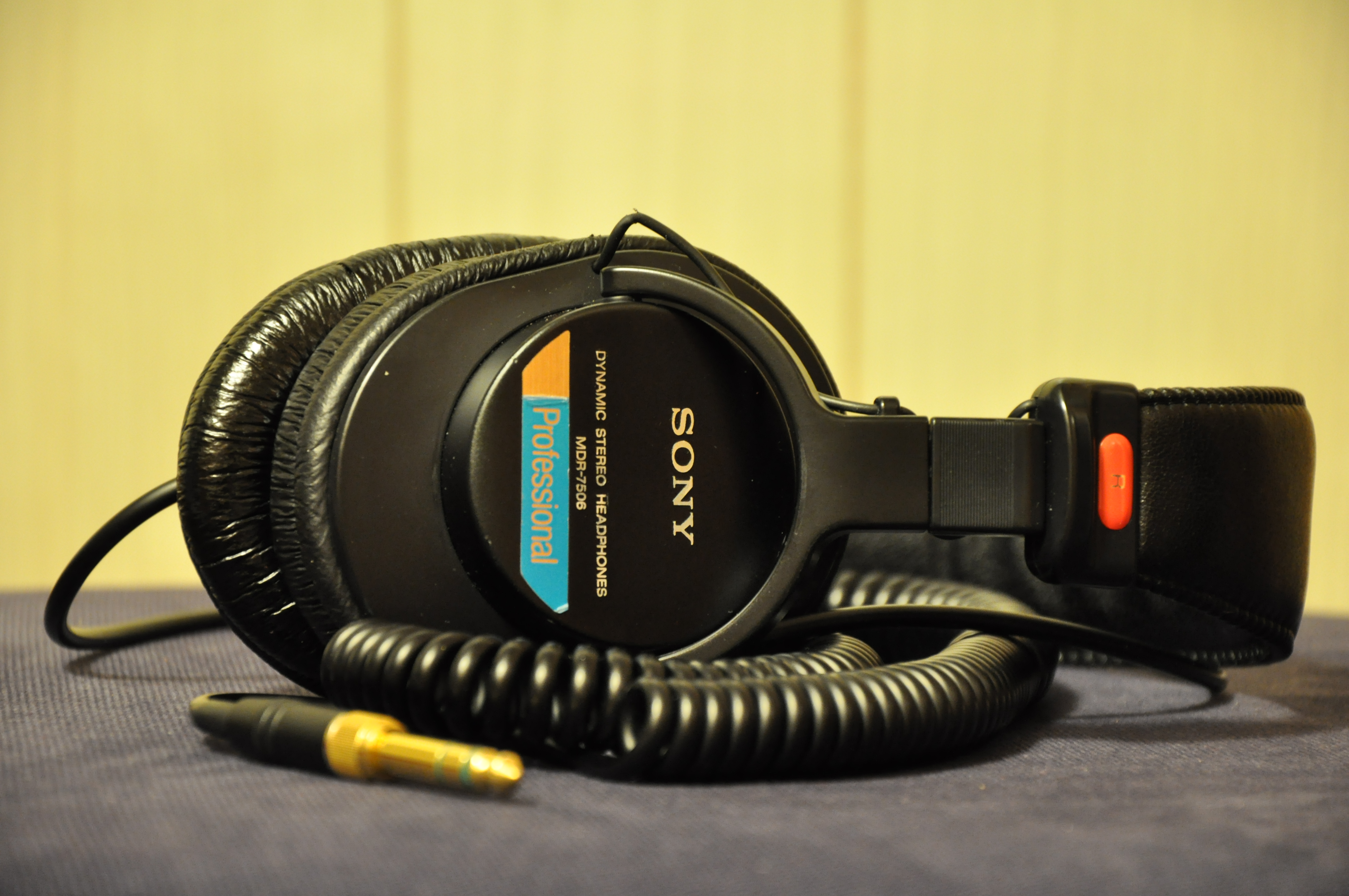
Sony MDR-7506 headphones, used as a studio monitor for the recording

After his band The Crosswalk was dropped from Hollywood Records in 1997, Cody Chesnutt spent several months recording The Headphone Masterpiece in his bedroom, which he used as a makeshift studio called the Sonic Promiseland, in Valley Village, California. He used a 4-track recorder, and recorded the songs entirely by himself with equipment worth $10,000, including one microphone, an organ, a guitar, bass, and keyboard. He used a pair of Sony MDR-7506 headphones as a studio monitor in order not to wake up his roommate. The album was subsequently mastered by Brian Gardner.

== Music and lyrics ==
A 36-song double album, The Headphone Masterpiece has overdubbed, distorted production, and incorporates pop rock, soul, R&B, and hip hop styles. Music journalist Philip Sherburne said that it explores British Invasion music on songs such as "Upstarts in a Blowout", synthpop on "The World Is Coming to My Party", and "cheerfully misogynist" hip hop on "Bitch, I'm Broke", but the album's "core is classic soul". Jared Levy from Tiny Mix Tapes called it a neo soul album, while The Fader magazine's Knox Robinson categorized it as lo-fi music.

"The Seed"
A 20-second sample of the song, Chesnutt's ode to infidelity

Chesnutt's lyrics mix irony and sincerity. He wrote the album to express the complexity of his personal experiences, such as falling in love with his wife, rock and roll, and reconciling his love for the music with the trappings of the rock lifestyle. Pitchfork journalist Rob Mitchum wrote that "Serve This Royalty" celebrates Chesnutt's "cultural sect", and "The Seed" mixes his "hypersexual egotism" with "a tone of evolutionary bravado." On the former song, Chesnutt sings "Thank you Jesus / For my mama / Thank you bitches / For my money". He said of recording the song, "I woke up, went to the organ, and played these chords". Following "Bitch, I'm Broke", the album features a suite of songs written about Chesnutt's wife and the pleasures of monogamy.

== Marketing and sales ==
Chesnutt shopped the album around to record companies, but they mistook it for a demo and rejected it. They encouraged him to reproduce it smoothly, rearrange the drums, and rerecord his vocals. He said in an interview for Vibe at the time, "I refuse to re-record it – that defeats the purpose. What about the experience I had in my bedroom? To go back to the studio, I'd be chasing something. If you're listening to it and you love it, then it's already done what it's supposed to do." In September 2002, Chesnutt made the album available through his website, and released it on September 24 on his own label Ready, Set, Go! A music video was released for the track "Look Good in Leather", receiving moderate airplay on MTV.

Chesnutt performed at clubs in Los Angeles in the album's promotion. He subsequently toured with Macy Gray, Erykah Badu, and The Roots, who covered his song "The Seed" on their 2002 album Phrenology. The band released a music video for the song featuring Chesnutt, which received airplay on MTV. Consequently, The Headphone Masterpiece entered the Billboard 200 at number 128 with sales of 8,000 copies. By March 30, 2003, it had sold 25,000 copies, according to Nielsen SoundScan. It spent one week on the Billboard 200.

== Critical reception ==
Professional ratings
Review scores
Source	Rating
AllMusic	4.5/5 stars
Blender	4/5 stars
Christgau's Consumer Guide	(2-star Honorable Mention)
Drowned in Sound	8/10
eMusic	4/5 stars
Mojo	3/5 stars
Pitchfork	7.4/10
Rolling Stone	4/5 stars
Uncut	5/5 stars

The Headphone Masterpiece was well received by most critics. Reviewing the album in Rolling Stone, Tom Moon hailed it as "one of the most emotionally raw albums of the year" and a record that "gathered musical strands from all over the pop universe into unadorned, remarkably intimate stream-of-consciousness musings on love, money and responsibility". AllMusic's Mike Gowan called it a "lo-fi gem" and "an eclectic celebration of sound", while Uncut said it is "an awesome declaration of intent" and, "although decidedly lo-fi, this epic, adventurous and mischievous album bears comparison with Prince and Todd Rundgren (at their respective peaks)." Matt Diehl from Spin regarded the music as "indie soul that traverses the chasm between Shuggie Otis and Guided by Voices". Writing for Vibe, Dream Hampton said it is "everything that many roots and retro artists have reached for, pure and straightforward; yet it is thoroughly modern in its outlook, inventive and unsentimental, with both feet in the future."

Some reviewers expressed reservations. Mojo found the record "at once engaging and aloof", with "its often hamfisted production and errant vocals adding to its ramshackle, rusticated charms". In The A.V. Club, Nathan Rabin said the album was "musically uneven in the best way", calling it "a brilliant, self-indulgent, kaleidoscopic, contradictory mess". Mitchum from Pitchfork observed "a surplus of uniqueness overshadows a respectable aptitude" and remarked that its "self-indulgence, lack of focus, and unbridled sonic and lyrical crudity" makes the album "so frustrating, yet compelling." Village Voice critic Robert Christgau cited "Family on Blast", "The World Is Coming to My Party", and "My Woman, My Guitars" as highlights and said the album is "just what alt-r&b needed—loads of ideas, considerable talent, and all the stern self-discipline of a trust fund baby".

== Track listing ==
All songs were written, arranged, and produced by Cody Chesnutt.

Disc one

1. "Magic in a Mortal Minute" – 0:38
2. "With Me in Mind" (with Sonja Marie) – 3:51
3. "Upstarts in a Blowout" – 3:04
4. "Boylife in America" – 2:21
5. "Bitch, I'm Broke" – 1:59
6. "Serve This Royalty" – 5:42
7. "The Seed" – 3:24
8. "Enough of Nothing" – 0:58
9. "Setting the System" – 0:46
10. "The Most Beautiful Shame" – 0:49
11. "Smoke and Love" – 3:38
12. "Michelle" – 3:08
13. "No One Will" – 2:59
14. "Batman vs. Blackman" – 1:02
15. "Up in the Treehouse" – 2:08
16. "Can't Get No Betta'" – 3:32
17. "She's Still Here" – 2:15
18. "Can We Teach Each Other" – 4:02
19. "The World Is Coming to My Party" – 4:26
20. "Brother with an Ego" – 0:13
21. "War Between the Sexes" – 1:36
22. "The Make Up" – 2:31
23. "Out of Nowhere" – 1:45

Disc two

1. "Family on Blast" – 3:55
2. "My Women, My Guitars" – 3:15
3. "Somebody's Parent" – 1:46
4. "When I Find Time" – 4:03
5. "Eric Burdon" – 2:41
6. "Juicin' the Dark" – 4:56
7. "5 on a Joyride" – 3:32
8. "Daylight" – 0:49
9. "So Much Beauty in the Subconscious" – 2:03
10. "Daddy's Baby" – 2:37
11. "If We Don't Disagree" – 3:23
12. "Look Good in Leather" – 3:55
13. "6 Seconds" – 4:28

== Personnel ==
Credits are adapted from the album's liner notes.

- Cody Chesnutt – arranger, composer, engineer, mixing, vocals
- Brian Gardner – mastering
- RH – saxophone (track 6)
- Sonja Marie – vocals (track 2)
- Talley Thomas – background vocals (track 27), dialogue (track 24)

== Charts ==
Chart (2003)	Peak position
U.S. Billboard 200	128
U.S. Top Independent Albums	6
