= Jojo Burger Tempest =

Studio album by Working for a Nuclear Free City
- Released: September 2010
- Genre: Electronic music, electronica, shoegaze
- Length: 88:34
- Label: Melodic

Working for a Nuclear Free City chronology
Businessmen & Ghosts (2007)	Jojo Burger Tempest (2010)

Jojo Burger Tempest is a double album by the British band Working for a Nuclear Free City. Released in 2010, the album is the band's third album, and the second to be released in the U.S. The album contains one disc of 17 individual songs and one of a single 33-minute suite.

== Production ==
Production for the album took place over the span of 18 months with time being split between a warehouse in northern England and a cottage situated in France. Sessions initially consisted of the band creating short loops and layering them over each other. Over 2,000 thirty second loops were created over the course of four to six months. A large majority of the material was described as “shit” and was subsequently scrapped as the band reviewed the material in France. Not much progress was made during their time in France with only one song being created from the loops on hand. Phil would call the process in France “hard” in a later interview.

The loop structure would soon prove to be rather challenging as the band had troubles with developing structure beyond the initial looped framework. “Well that was the problem because once we’d got a loop, that was stuck where it was and we couldn’t take it anywhere. We wanted to make the kind of music that is loop based, but when we wanted to make songs with more structure it just… [didn’t work].” says Phil. Later the band would attempt to try a more traditional style of writing, moving away from using looped structures to playing more material live.

The 33 minute title track was created by Phil in one day on his laptop while hungover. “I’m going to do a whole half-hour track today, one way or another. I’m just going to throw them all together and sit here.” Kay adds. The endeavor was mostly done live as small, unused loops from previous sessions would play while Kay would mix in the “next sound [he] thought would work”. The stylistic goal was to create something akin to a DJ set or a mixtape, something Kay has stated to be a style he has wanted to try for a while.

== Reception ==
Professional ratings
Aggregate scores
Source	Rating
Metacritic	68
Review scores
Source	Rating
Pitchfork	7.7/10
Drowned in Sound	5/10
Spin	Favorable
DIY	4.5/5 stars
Slant Magazine	2.5/5 stars
Under the Radar	7/10
PopMatters	5/10

Critical response to the album was mixed with comments about the album being bloated as a common complaint. "–Jojo is a double album, a detail which often indicates a band struggled to trim the fat off the raw recording session material." Says Sean Cooper in a PopMatters review. Marc Hogan of Pitchfork commented that the album is "a lot to take in, but with its blend of live drumming, textural guitars, skittering electronics, and wistful harmonies, it's worth braving Jojo's, uh, storm". Robert Cooke of Drowned in Sound noted that "the hour-long main section of Jojo Burger Tempest is too hollow to be of much merit". Spin magazine's Jon Young described the music as "hopscotching through styles with fidgety glee".

== Track listing ==
All tracks are written by Phil Kay, Gary McClure, Ed Hulme, Jon Kay.

No.	Title	Length
1.	"Do A Stunt"	2:44
2.	"The Jojo Burger Tempest" (On physical releases, this track is relegated to its own disc.)	33:26
3.	"Silent Times"	3:18
4.	"Autoblue"	3:30
5.	"Alphaville"	4:39
6.	"Pachinko"	3:36
7.	"Faster Daniel Faster"	3:01
8.	"A Black Square With Four Yellow Stars"	2:03
9.	"Black Rivers"	3:50
10.	"Float Bridges"	3:07
11.	"The King And June"	2:06
12.	"B.A.R.R.Y"	4:05
13.	"Little Lenin"	3:36
14.	"Inokashira Park"	2:42
15.	"Low"	3:45
16.	"Burning Drum"	3:11
17.	"Brown Owl"	3:31
18.	"Buildings"	2:16
Total length:		88:34

== Personnel ==
Credits adapted from liner notes.

- Phil Kay – production, artwork, [additional] photography
- Ed Hulme – photography
- Thax Douglas – Vocals [spoken word]
- Working for a Nuclear Free City – writing, & performance
