= V6 (disambiguation) =

A V6 is an engine with six cylinders in two banks of three.

V6 or V-6 may also refer to:

== Science and technology ==
- ITU-T V.6, a withdrawn recommendation for data signalling
- Version 6 Unix, a reference to the sixth edition of Research Unix from 1975
- Dorsomedial area, (Area V6) of the visual cortex
- V_{6}, one of six precordial leads in electrocardiography
- V6 television set-top-box, used by Virgin Media – refer to V+#History

== Places ==
- V6 Grafton Street, a road in Milton Keynes
- Federated States of Micronesia, by ITU prefix

== Other ==
- SSSR-V6 OSOAVIAKhIM, a Soviet airship
- V6 (quickstep), a dance figure in quickstep
- V6 (band), a Japanese musical group
- ATC code V06 General nutrients, a subgroup of the Anatomical Therapeutic Chemical Classification System

== See also ==
- Sony MDR-V6, a large diaphragm foldable headphone
- 6V (disambiguation)
- VVVVVV, 2010 puzzle-platform game by Terry Cavanagh
