= Pussy Galore (disambiguation) =

Pussy Galore is a character from the James Bond novel and film Goldfinger. It may also refer to:

- Pussy Galore (band), a rock group
- "Pussy Galore", a song on the 2002 album Phrenology (album) by the Philadelphia hip hop band The Roots
