= 6V =

6V or 6-V may refer to:

- 6V, IATA code for Mars RK airlines
- 6v, abbreviations for 6 volts
- 6V, abbreviation for 6-valve engine
- 6V-71, engine used in Detroit Diesel Series 71
- 6V-92, engine used in Detroit Diesel Series 92
- 6V, the production code for the 1985 Doctor Who serial Vengeance on Varos

== See also ==
- V6 (disambiguation)
- VVVVVV, 2010 puzzle-platform game by Terry Cavanagh
