= Businessmen & Ghosts =

Studio album by Working for a Nuclear Free City
- Released: September 2007
- Genres: Electronic music, electronica, shoegaze
- Length: 1:44:21
- Label: Deaf Dumb & Blind

Working for a Nuclear Free City chronology
Working for a Nuclear Free City (2006)	Businessmen & Ghosts (2007)	Jojo Burger Tempest (2010)

Professional ratings
Review scores
Source	Rating
Exclaim!	Favorable
NME	8/10 (07/26/2008, p.33)
Pitchfork	7.6/10
PopMatters	Mixed
Spin	Favorable
Impose	Mixed

Businessmen & Ghosts is a double album by British band Working for a Nuclear Free City. The album is Working for a Nuclear Free City's American debut album, released in September of 2007.

The double disc set includes their self-titled first album as well as the majority of their Rocket EP (lacking only one of the four tracks, "Waiting Game"), both previously UK-only releases.

== Production ==
Stemming from the creation and release of previous material, Businessmen & Ghosts features 12 new songs out of the 29 song track list. The new music was recorded in a similar way to the material on their self-titled English debut with songs being built up from instrumentals before layering on guitars and vocals. Much sampling was used for the drumming.

Sonically, the album is split between melodic songs, most of which is from their debut, as well as more abstract and atmospheric instrumentals, which are most of the new songs. The title of the album itself is meant to reference the split with Phil saying "the businessmen are the unit shifters [while] the ghosts are the bonus material, which could have been forgotten about forever."

== Touring ==
The release of Businessmen & Ghosts would be the first time the band would tour in America. Just two days before their first gig, Neil Harris would join the band as a session guitarist and subsequently was not on the tour.

Beginning in February 2008, the band played in various states over the course of the next month. They visited bars and clubs in places such as Chicago, Washington, Massachusetts and California.

Upon return Gary McClure would describe the experience as "[blurred] into one tired grey mass of alcoholic anxiety and Wendy’s dog meat." McClure reportedly also "abused" his body on tour to the point where he had to be rushed into a hospital in Texas and left with three feet of intestines removed. What he exactly did to himself was never specified. The band swore to never return to the states but soon retracted the statement as they "[couldn’t] wait to get over there [to America] again." Despite their troubles in America it would later be reflected on as "very good" in a 2010 interview.

== Track listing ==
All tracks are written by Phil Kay, Gary McClure, Ed Hulme, Jon Kay.

Disc one
No.	Title	Length
1.	"224th Day"	1:42
2.	"Troubled Son"	2:49
3.	"Dead Fingers Talking"	3:29
4.	"Rocket"	4:47
5.	"Kingdom"	4:06
6.	"Sarah Dreams of Summer"	3:22
7.	"Apron Strings"	3:56
8.	"All American Taste"	3:06
9.	"Quiet Place"	4:33
10.	"So"	3:57
11.	"England"	7:24
12.	"Over"	3:44
13.	"Fallout"	1:53
14.	"Forever"	4:35
15.	"Stone Cold"	3:27
Total length:		1:44:21 (both discs)

Disc two
No.	Title	Length
1.	"Eighty Eight"	3:37
2.	"Donkey"	4:08
3.	"Get a Fucking Haircut"	1:37
4.	"Innocence"	4:18
5.	"Home"	1:17
6.	"Heaven Kissing Hill"	4:24
7.	"The Tape"	2:58
8.	"Asleep At The Wheel"	4:20
9.	"Pretty Police State"	1:08
10.	"Soft Touch"	6:32
11.	"Pixelated Birds"	1:39
12.	"Je Suis le Vent"	3:03
13.	"Nancy Adam Susan"	5:58
14.	"The Tree"	2:32
Total length:		1:44:21 (both discs)

== Personnel ==
All songs written by Phil Kay (credited simply as "Dekko"), Gary McClure, Ed Hulme, Jon Kay.

- Dekko – vocals, keyboards, artwork, production (all tracks)
- Jon Kay – drums, percussion
- Gary McClure – guitar, bass
- Ed Hulme – vocals, guitar, bass
- Simon Webb – Photography
