= American Wrestlers (album) =

Studio album by American Wrestlers
- Released: 2014 (self-release); April 7, 2015 (re-release)
- Recorded: 2014, St. Louis, Missouri
- Genre: Indie rock
- Labels: Self-released (2014); Fat Possum Records (re-release)
- Producer: Gary McClure

American Wrestlers chronology
American Wrestlers (2014)	Goodbye Terrible Youth (2016)

Singles from American Wrestlers
- 1. "I Can Do No Wrong / The Rest of You" Released: February 10, 2015

American Wrestlers is the debut studio album by indie rock act American Wrestlers, initially self-released on BandCamp in 2014, and re-released on April 7, 2015, on Fat Possum Records. The album was recorded entirely by Gary McClure on an eight-track Tascam recorder.

== Background and recording ==
In 2014, following the break-up of Gary McClure's band, Working for a Nuclear Free City, and the release of his debut solo album, Wreaths (2013), McClure moved to St. Louis, Missouri, to marry his then-girlfriend, Bridget Imperial. McClure subsequently purchased an eight-track Tascam recorder and a bass guitar at a local pawn shop and recorded American Wrestlers at his new home. Regarding the album's lo-fi recording process, McClure noted, "The last time I recorded on like a 4-track or an 8-track was when I was like thirteen/fourteen in my bedroom, and this is the first thing I've recorded on 8-tracks since then."

== Writing and composition ==
The track, "Kelly", is partly written about Kelly Thomas, an American homeless man who was beaten to death by police in 2011. Gary McClure noted, "It concerns some other things too: parts of America. Parts of people. Artless strips of neon over a trough that spreads further than any animal could ever walk."

Regarding the album's opening and closing tracks, "There's No One Crying Over Me Either" and "Left", McClure stated: "They’re both songs about human failures to connect in an open, real and faithfully exposed way because of being unable to let go of the feeling of being special, which is something produced by the ego."

== Reception ==
Professional ratings
Aggregate scores
Source	Rating
Metacritic	74/100
Review scores
Source	Rating
AllMusic	4/5 stars

American Wrestlers has received mostly favorable reviews from music critics. At Metacritic, which assigns a normalized rating out of 100 to reviews from mainstream critics, the album received an average score of 74 based on 7 reviews, indicating "generally favorable reviews".

In a very positive review for the album, Allmusic: "The debut album from American Wrestlers confirms that the lo-fi aesthetic is still going strong in the 21st century [...] The result is one of the best crummy-sounding pop albums of recent memory."

== Track listing ==
All tracks are written by Gary McClure.

No.	Title	Length
1.	"There's No One Crying Over Me Either"	4:52
2.	"Holy"	5:50
3.	"Wild Yonder"	5:24
4.	"I Can Do No Wrong"	3:48
5.	"The Rest of You"	4:33
6.	"Kelly"	4:47
7.	"Cheapshot"	7:18
8.	"Left"	6:14

Digital Bonus Track
No.	Title	Length
9.	"This Ain't"	5:51
