= American Wrestlers =

American indie rock band

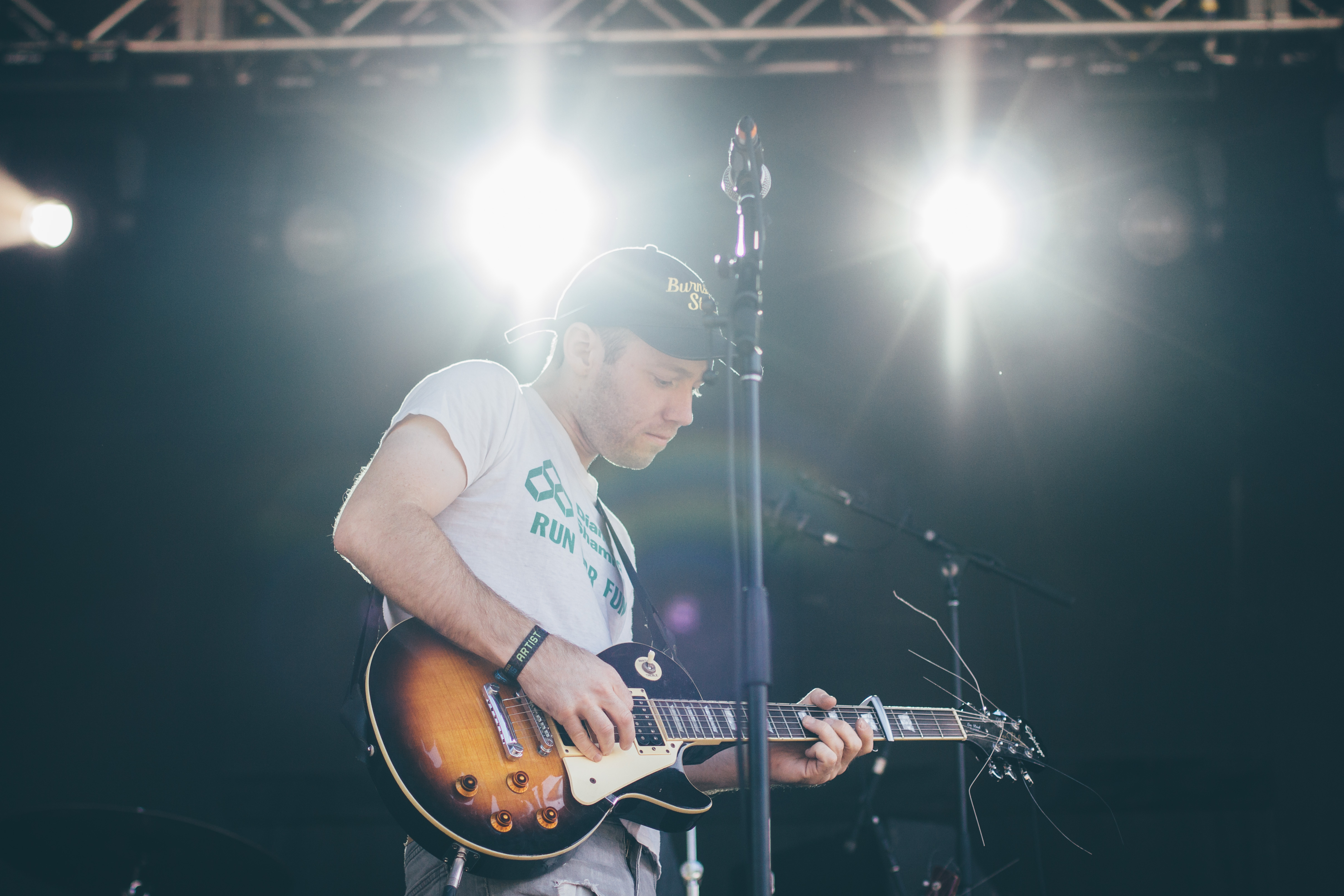
- American Wrestlers perform at Loufest 2015

Background information
- Origin: St. Louis, Missouri, United States
- Genres: Indie rock
- Years active: 2014-present
- Label: Fat Possum Records
- Spinoff of: Working for a Nuclear Free City
- Members: Gary McClure; Bridgette Imperial; Ian Reitz; Josh Van Hoorebeke
- Website: americanwrestlers.bandcamp.com

American Wrestlers is an American indie rock band from St. Louis, Missouri, United States, formed in 2014. Initially founded as a solo project by Scottish musician Gary McClure, the band also includes Bridgette Imperial, Ian Reitz and Josh Van Hoorebeke.

To date American Wrestlers have released two studio albums, American Wrestlers (2015), recorded solely by McClure, and Goodbye Terrible Youth, released in 2016.

== History ==
=== Origins and American Wrestlers (2014–2015) ===
Following the break-up of his band, Working for a Nuclear Free City, and the release of his debut solo album, Wreaths (2013), McLure moved from Manchester, England to St. Louis, Missouri to marry his then-girlfriend, Bridgette Imperial. McClure subsequently recorded American Wrestler's self-titled debut at the couple's home, on an eight-track Tascam recorder.

American Wrestlers was initially released for free on BandCamp. After receiving attention from various music blogs and websites, Fat Possum Records re-released the album in 2015. Following the release of the album, McClure assembled a band, including Imperial on keyboard and rhythm guitar, bassist Ian Reitz, and drummer Josh Van Hoorebeke.

=== Goodbye Terrible Youth (2016–present) ===
On November 4, 2016, the band released its second studio album, Goodbye Terrible Youth.

== Discography ==
=== Studio albums ===
- American Wrestlers (2014)
- Goodbye Terrible Youth (2016)

=== Singles ===
- "I Can Do No Wrong" / "The Rest of You" (2015)
- "Give Up" (2016)
