= Working for a Nuclear Free City =

Indie nu gaze band

- Origin: Manchester, England
- Genres: Nu gaze, alternative rock
- Years active: 1999-2014, 2015
- Label: Melodic Records
- Spinoffs: American Wrestlers; Motorifik
- Past members: Phil Kay; Gary McClure; Jon Kay; Ed Hulme; Neil Harris

Working for a Nuclear Free City (sometimes abbreviated to WFANFC) was an indie nu gaze band from Manchester, England.

== History ==
Originating in Cheshire England, founding members Philip Kay (production and keyboard) along with his brother Jon Kay (drums) and schoolfriend Gary McLure (guitar) formed WFANFC as a studio project in 1999; coining the name from a sign they saw in Manchester. “We liked the name because of the irony and the related conspiracy theories of secret bunkers hidden around Manchester,” says McLure. Members of the band would also refer to the name as “pretentious” in interviews.

The band initially started with creating a variety of instrumental soundscapes before later integrating vocal tracks. “We have always intended to have vocals on the tracks, but there just wasn’t anyone to do it,” Phil says. Soon in 2004 the band would begin to perform live with bassist Ed Hulme joining just 2 days before their first gig. Guitarist Neil Harris would also join the band as a session musician shortly before their American tour in 2008.

The band's self-titled debut album was released in the UK in 2006. Tracks from the album also formed part of their debut American release, Businessmen & Ghosts, which came out in November 2007. Businessmen & Ghosts would be a double album that was made up of their previous self-titled album as well as most of the Rocket EP; combining into a total of 29 tracks. Both albums were composed of music that was written ever since the band’s conception. “Yes, it [self-titled] feels like a 'Best of' because it is the sum of 80 tracks produced over six years, and it still sounds very 'together'.” says McLure in a BBC interview. Fallout would also be described as the song that best sums the band up.

WFANFC's releases have won them praise from a variety of media outlets, including Spin, the BBC,Stylus, and Citylife magazine; their song "Rocket" was featured on National Public Radio in June 2007.

The band performed on the Topman Unsigned Stage at the Carling Weekend's Leeds Festival in 2007.

WFANFC would also be nominated for the 2008 annual Shortlist Prize along with Arcade Fire, Burial, Feist, Justice, LCD Soundsystem, M.I.A., Spoon, Stars, and Wilco.

In 2009 the band was approached by the development team for the video game Infamous to create the song that plays at the end of the game. The song is called "Silent Melody".

Later that year in October 2010 their third album, Jojo Burger Tempest was released; an eclectic mostly instrumental album that featured a 33 minute title track. Production for the album lasted only 18 months and has been stated to have “2,000-odd ideas” of layered short loops.

In January 2011 the band opened a YouTube channel, uploading snippets of a fourth album, Apoptosis. No record label was named. In 2011, the band released the single "Turning Shadow" via their Bandcamp.

In 2013, guitarist Gary McClure released his solo record, Wreaths, on AED Records. In celebration of this release, the band's Facebook page shared an unreleased 52-minute-long album titled Odds and Sods posted to member Phil Kay's SoundCloud.

A new album, however, entitled What Do People Do All Day was released in 2016. Phil would later go on to state that the album title had a double meaning, one being a reference to the Richard Scarry book and the other being about the monotony of life.

In April of 2023, WFANFC announced (on their Facebook page) a one-off show at the Mercury Lounge in NYC, on Friday July 21st, 2023. However, the show was later cancelled.

Later in May of the same year, the band would upload a collection of 6 previously unreleased tracks to their Bandcamp over the course of two weeks. Each track description came with a small vignette relating to the song.

== Side projects and spinoffs ==
In August of 2010, an album called “Secret Things” would be released by Phil and French songwriter Idrisse Khelifi under the name “Motorifik”. The project was formed when the two met in Manchester in 2006. Secret Things would be ranked in 38th place for Under The Radar’s Highest Rated Albums of 2010.

In 2014, producer and keyboardist Phil Kay released his solo record, Zoetrope as King of the Mountains on Melodic Records to mixed yet mostly positive reviews.

Gary McClure currently records under the name American Wrestlers, and released his self-titled debut album, American Wrestlers, in 2014. During promotion for the album, he noted WFANFC had broken up.

== Musical style ==
The band cites a wide array of influences, including artists as disparate as Bill Evans, Devo, The Grateful Dead, and Yes.

Other comparisons have been drawn between them and acts like Sigur Ros, Chemical Brothers, Spiritualized and Primal Scream. Such extensiveness has made them a difficult band to properly categorize, along with their penchant to leap from genre to genre within and between albums.

This tendency was especially prevalent in their eponymous album and subsequently Businessmen & Ghosts with songs like the bass heavy “Troubled Son” which incorporates krautrock and psychedelia, juxtaposing sonically with the breezy atmospherics of “224th Day” and howling strings of “The Tree”.

Moving forward from their debut, WFANFC would mellow out their sound with Jojo Burger Tempest, with less focus on their previous rumbling “Madchester” post-rock sound now replaced with textural, prog, and electronic influences like Boards of Canada and M83.

With What Do People Do All Day, they continued to incorporate multiple genres, moving from indie-pop to minimal experimental music on “Cassetteboy’s Theme” and “Run”, while including hip-hop and shoegaze influences on tracks such as “New Day” and “Bottlerocket”.

WFANFC's sound has been described as "a flawless lucid-dream trip through a thousand fantastical influences" and "as fresh as morning rain on Piccadilly Gardens" as well as “a druggy amalgam of rave, rock, and pop, generous with block-rockin' breakbeats, full-body bass grooves, and crystalline dream-pop comedowns.”

Regarding their importance, major media outlets such as the BBC have stated: "it’s the way that [WFANFC and The Longcut, another British music group] have distilled Manchester’s history into an exciting future brew that makes them important."

== Discography ==
=== Studio albums ===
- Working for a Nuclear Free City (2006)
- Businessmen & Ghosts (2007)
- Jojo Burger Tempest (2010)
- Odds and Sods (unreleased, 2013)
- What Do People Do All Day? (2015)

=== EPs ===
- Rocket (2007)
- Apoptosis (Unreleased, 2011)
- Turning Shadow - Single (2011)

=== Related albums ===
- Secret Things (2010), featuring members of Working for a Nuclear Free City and produced by member Phil Kay
- Wreaths (2013), solo album by guitarist Gary McClure
- Zoetrope (2014), solo album by producer and keyboardist Phil Kay under the alias "King of the Mountains"

== In other media ==
The song "Dead Fingers Talking" was featured in Pilot of the AMC Original Series Breaking Bad. Phil would later go on to say that he had "no idea at the time that that show would go on to be a big deal."

In 2008, the band composed a commissioned piece, "History", for the Go On Lad Hovis advertisement.

The song "Asleep at the Wheel" was used for a relaunch trailer for the British Channel 5 re-branding in 2008 and at the close of an Apple promotional video for the 10/2009 update of the iMac.

In 2009, Spoke Film's director Gary Holder used the song "England" in a launch film for the Jaguar X-Type: X409.

In 2009 the band produced another commissioned track for the PlayStation 3 game inFamous, and was used in the Power Trip trailer for the game. The track, entitled "Silent Melody", was available for download on iTunes on May 21, 2009.

The song "Rocket" was used in the soundtrack for the 2009 movie, Push.

"Troubled Son" would also be in the international trailer for the 2010 movie Green Zone.
