= Goodbye Terrible Youth =

Studio album by American Wrestlers
- Released: November 5, 2016
- Genre: Indie rock
- Label: Fat Possum Records

American Wrestlers chronology
American Wrestlers (2015)	Goodbye Terrible Youth (2016)

Singles from Goodbye Terrible Youth
- 1. "Give Up" Released: August 16, 2016; 2. "Amazing Grace" Released: September 22, 2016; 3. "Hello, Dear" Released: October 11, 2016

Goodbye Terrible Youth is the second studio album by the indie rock band American Wrestlers, released on November 4, 2016 on Fat Possum Records.

== Critical reception ==
Professional ratings
Aggregate scores
Source	Rating
Metacritic	77/100
Review scores
Source	Rating
AllMusic	4/5 stars

Goodbye Terrible Youth received favourable reviews upon its release. At Metacritic, which assigns a normalized rating out of 100 to reviews from mainstream critics, the album has received an average score of 77, based on 9 reviews, indicating "generally favorable reviews".

Praising the album's improved production values, in comparison to its home-recorded predecessor, American Wrestlers, and the participation of the full band, Allmusic's Marcy Donelson wrote: [Goodbye Terrible Youth] also exhibits a sleeker sound than the notably rough-hewn debut, with McClure having invested in "a laptop and some decent microphones." Thankfully, these changes don't erode the outfit's free-spirited charisma. If anything, the effect here is more similar to moving from a live recording to the studio than into something that's watered down or compromised."

In a positive review for Pitchfork, Brian Burlage wrote, "The album is a significant improvement for a band that’s still coming into its own, still, in other words, in its youth."

== Track listing ==
No.	Title	Length
1.	"Vote Thatcher"	2:51
2.	"Give Up"	3:25
3.	"So Long"	3:39
4.	"Hello, Dear"	3:07
5.	"Amazing Grace"	3:50
6.	"Terrible Youth"	4:17
7.	"Blind Kids"	2:53
8.	"Someone Far Away"	3:56
9.	"Real People"	3:41

== Personnel ==
- Bridgette Imperial – keyboards
- Gary McClure – guitar, vocals
- Ian Reitz – bass
- Josh Van Hoorebeke – drums
