= The Seed (2.0) =

Single by The Roots featuring Cody Chesnutt

from the album Phrenology
- Released: March 31, 2003
- Recorded: November 2001
- Genre: Rock; hip-hop; psychedelic soul; roots rock; avant rap; dirty rap; rap rock
- Length: 4:27
- Label: MCA
- Songwriters: Tariq Trotter; Antonious Bernard Thomas
- Producers: Questlove; Cody ChestnuTT (co.)

The Roots featuring Cody Chesnutt singles chronology
"Break You Off" (2002)	"The Seed (2.0)" (2003)	"Don't Say Nuthin'" (2004)

Music video
- "The Seed (2.0)" on YouTube

"The Seed (2.0)" is the second single by The Roots from their fifth album Phrenology (2002). The track, which features Cody Chesnutt on the guitar and vocals, is an "uptempo retooling" of his song "The Seed" from the album The Headphone Masterpiece. The song's music video was nominated for the MTV2 Award at the 2003 MTV Video Music Awards. Jeff Vrabel of Billboard described the track as "a genre-bending mix of rock guitars and Prince-styled keyboards and drums".

== Music and reception ==
"The Seed (2.0)" is a hybrid mix of "distorted rock, hip-hop and psychedelic soul". Brett Berliner of Stylus Magazine called the track "a rock song, featuring a little bit of funk and just a very little bit of hip-hop." The song was favorably received by music critics. Robert Christgau called it the album's "centerpiece", "2002's freshest roots rock track and jammingest avant rap track". Pitchfork's Sam Chennault described the song as an "orgiastic garage funk number" and called it the album's "most immediately satisfying track". In 2009, Pitchfork listed it at number 330 in "The Top 500 Tracks of the 2000s". Stylus Magazine's Brett Berliner declared it the album's "best track" with its "catchy hook that stays with listeners for days". In The A.V. Club's 2002 top fifteen "Songs of the Year", Stephen Thompson listed the single at number nine. Jake Coyle of the Associated Press called it "one of the best rock songs of the decade". It was ranked as the 43rd best song of the decade by Rolling Stone.

== Charts ==
Chart performance for "The Seed (2.0)"
Chart (2003)	Peak position
Australia (ARIA)	78
Denmark (Tracklisten)	2
Finland (Suomen virallinen lista)	5
Germany (GfK)	67
Netherlands (Dutch Top 40)	35
Netherlands (Single Top 100)	31
Switzerland (Schweizer Hitparade)	22
UK Singles (OCC)	33

== Certifications ==
Certifications for "The Seed (2.0)"
Region	Certification	Certified units/sales
Denmark (IFPI Danmark)	Gold	45,000^{‡}
New Zealand (RMNZ)	Gold	15,000^{‡}
^{‡} Sales+streaming figures based on certification alone.

== Cover versions ==
- American rock band Person L covered the song for the Fearless Records compilation Punk Goes Crunk in 2008.
- Italian soul singer-songwriter Zucchero Fornaciari imitated the style and arrangement of the song, without directly covering it, on "Un kilo", a song from his 2006 album Fly. As "Un kilo" is not a full cover, it was credited only to Fornaciari.
- American jazz singer Kurt Elling covered it on his 2021 album Superblue, featuring guitarist Charlie Hunter.
