= Landing on a Hundred =

Studio album by Cody Chesnutt
- Released: October 30, 2012
- Genre: Soul
- Length: 53:11
- Label: Vibration Vineyard; One Little Indian
- Producer: Cody Chesnutt; Matthew John; Patrice Bart-Williams

Cody Chesnutt chronology
Black Skin No Value (2010)	Landing on a Hundred (2012)	My Love Divine Degree (2017)

Professional ratings
Aggregate scores
Source	Rating
Metacritic	80/100
Review scores
Source	Rating
Consequence of Sound	4/5 stars
This Is Fake DIY	8/10
American Songwriter	4/5 stars
The A.V. Club	B
Blurt Magazine	7/10
Pitchfork	7/10

Landing on a Hundred is the sophomore studio album by American R&B artist Cody Chesnutt. It was released in October 2012 under Vibration Vineyard and One Little Indian Records. The album was recorded at Royal Studios in Memphis, Tennessee and SuPow Studios in Cologne, Germany.

== Track list ==
No.	Title	Length
1.	"'Til I Met Thee"	4:25
2.	"I've Been Life"	4:37
3.	"That's Still Mama"	4:13
4.	"What Kind of Cool"	5:06
5.	"Don't Follow Me"	4:10
6.	"Everybody's Brother"	2:44
7.	"Love Is More Than a Wedding Day"	6:10
8.	"Under the Spell of the Handout"	4:09
9.	"Don't Wanna Go the Other Way"	3:44
10.	"Chips Down"	6:02
11.	"Where Is All The Money Going"	2:46
12.	"Scroll Call"	5:05
