= Mars RK =

Ukrainian charter airline

IATA	ICAO	Call sign
6V	MRW	AVIAMARS
- Founded: 2001
- Hubs: Kyiv International Airport (Zhuliany)
- Fleet size: 2
- Headquarters: Kyiv, Ukraine
- Website: mrk.com.ua

Mars RK, also known as MRK Airlines, was a Ukrainian charter airline based in the Kyiv International Airport (Zhuliany).

== Fleet ==
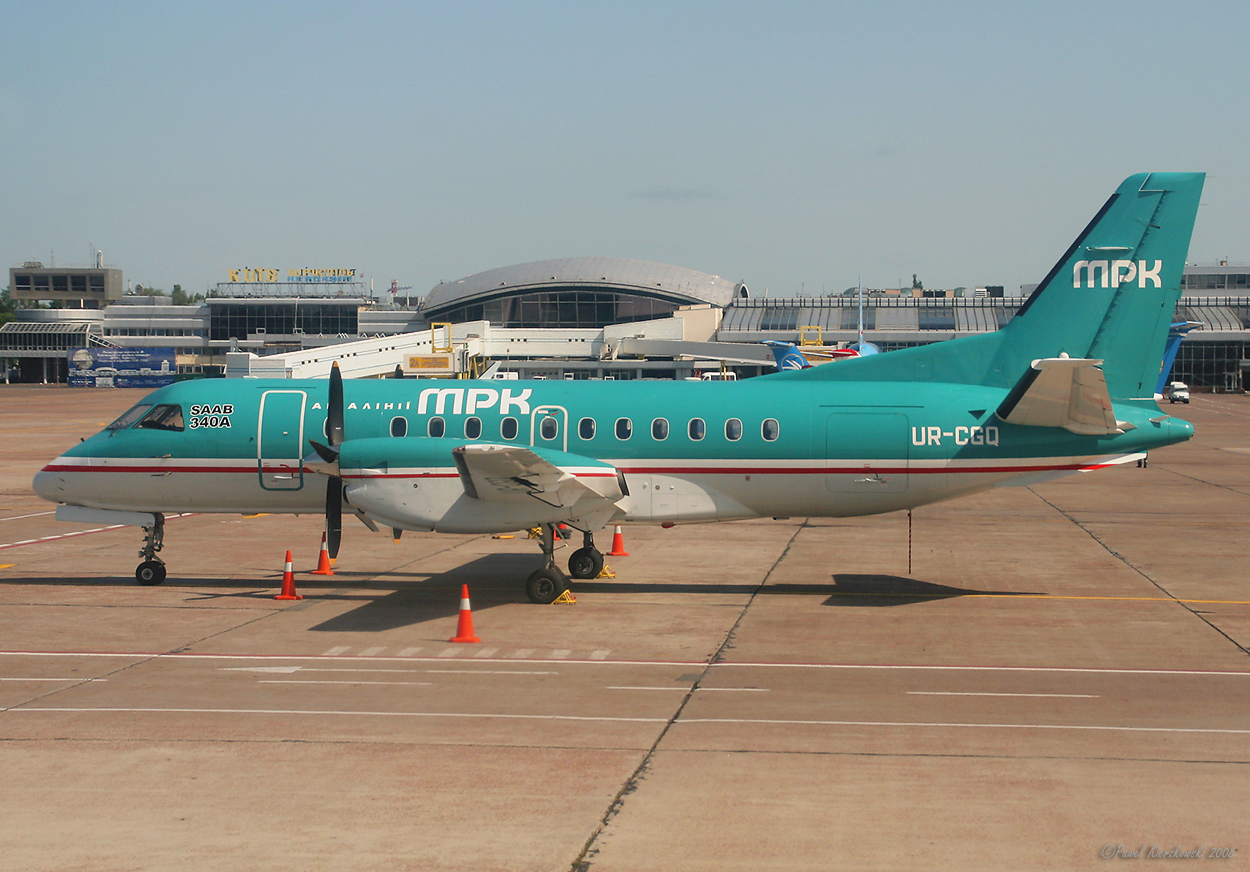
Mars RK Saab 340A

The Mars RK fleet included the following aircraft as of January 2013:

- 2 Saab 340A
- 2 Diamond DA42 Twin Star

Mars RK had signed a deal to purchase three Chinese Xian MA60 in 2012.
