= Cody Chesnutt =

American R&B and neo soul musician from Atlanta, Georgia

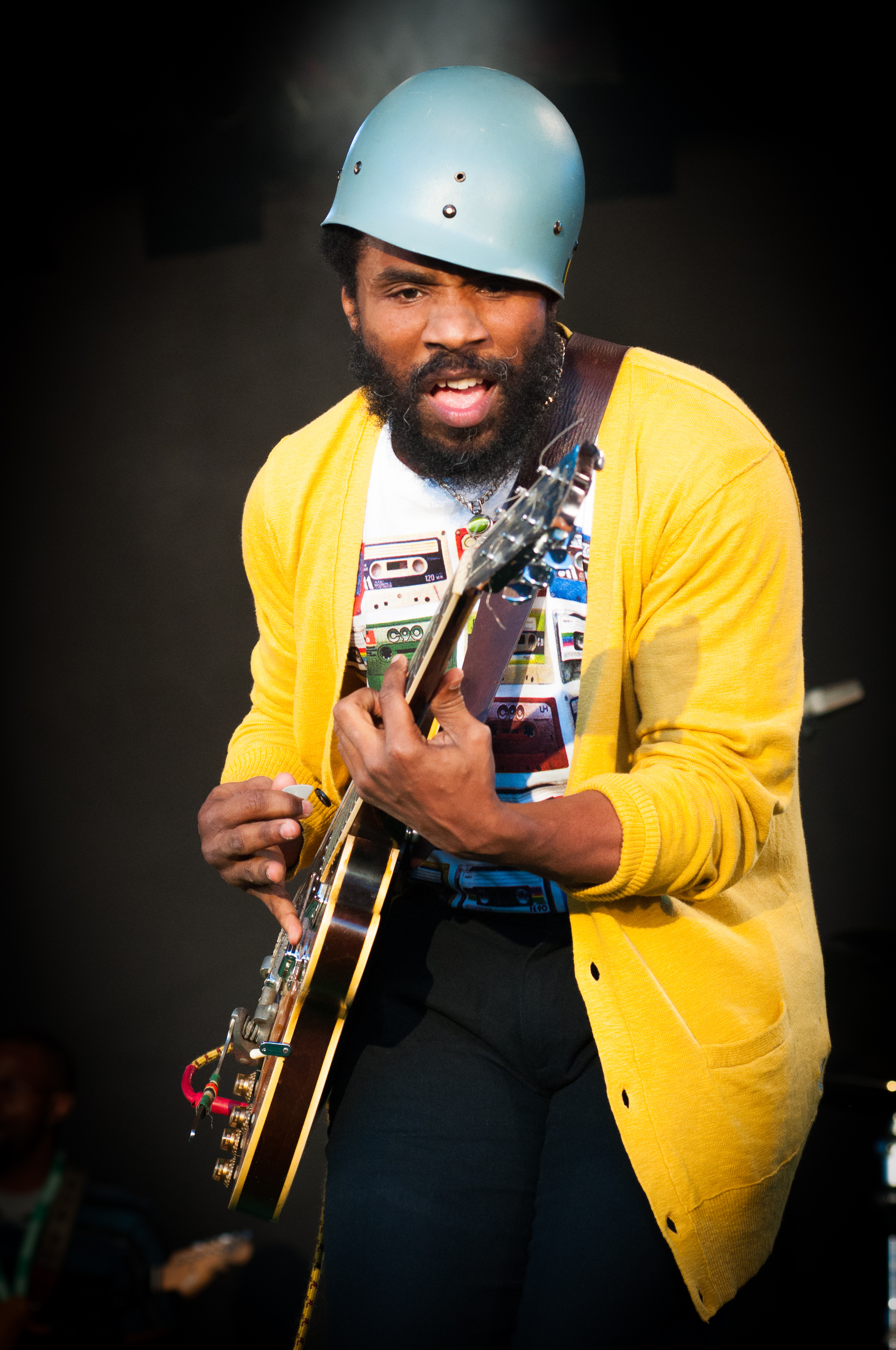
- Cody ChesnuTT at the 2011 Ilosaarirock festival.

Background information
- Born: Antonious Thomas; October 21, 1968 (age 57)
- Origin: Atlanta, Georgia
- Genres: Rock and roll, R&B, soul
- Occupations: Composer, musician
- Instruments: Vocals, guitar
- Formerly of: The Crosswalk

Antonious Thomas, better known by his stage name Cody Chesnutt (stylized as Cody ChesnuTT; born October 21, 1968) is an American R&B and neo soul musician from Atlanta, Georgia.

== Biography ==
Chesnutt's music blends elements of rock, funk, soul, hip hop, and blues. After relocating to Los Angeles, Chesnutt found work with Death Row records, writing and producing five songs for the male R&B group Six Feet Deep. Chesnutt and his former band, The Crosswalk with James (Jaime) O'Connell, John Maggio and Jay Gordon, had a brief stint with Hollywood Records, but they were later released from the label. The band subsequently broke up and Chesnutt released a double LP in 2002 entitled The Headphone Masterpiece, which was recorded on a 4-track cassette recorder in his bedroom recording studio, which he calls "The Sonic Promiseland".

His closest brush with mainstream success came in 2002, when the hip hop group The Roots remade a song from The Headphone Masterpiece, "The Seed", for their album Phrenology, as "The Seed (2.0)". Chesnutt plays guitar and sings vocals on the track, and appears in its music video, which received heavy airplay on MTV and BET. At the height of his popularity, Chesnutt's backing band consisted of drummer Craig Waters, now with the band The Bellrays, and bassist Aaron Ebensperger. In October 2003, Cody Chesnutt was nominated for the prestigious Shortlist Music Prize, and performed in the ceremony for the prize at the Wiltern Theatre in Los Angeles, California.

In 2006, Chesnutt appeared in the music documentary Dave Chappelle's Block Party, which was originally recorded in September 2004. The same year, he recorded the track "Boils" for the 4AD records album Plague Songs. On his Myspace announced an upcoming album titled The Live Release, which he has been performing around the world but is yet to be released. In 2007, he performed at the Pop Montreal music festival as one of the headliners.

In 2010 he released an EP called Black Skin No Value. Furthermore, he stated in an interview that he would publish his second big album Landing On A Hundred in 2012.

In 2012, Chesnutt performed live on Season 41 episode 06 of the BBC's show Later... with Jools Holland. The three songs performed were "Til I Met Thee", "Under the Spell of the Handout" and "That's Still Mama".

In 2020, Chesnutt wrote and performed an original song for the Pixar movie Soul called "Parting Ways".

== Discography ==
=== Albums ===
- 2002: The Headphone Masterpiece
- 2006: The Live Release (unpublished)
- 2010: Black Skin No Value (EP)
- 2012: Landing On A Hundred
- 2017: My Love Divine Degree

=== Singles ===
- 2001: "Look Good in Leather" ("AXE Instinct"-Werbespot (2009))
- 2002: "The World Is Coming"
- 2002: "The Seed (2.0)" (featuring The Roots) (UK No. 33)
- 2006: "The Last Adam"
- 2008: "Afrobama"
- 2010: "Come Back Like Spring"
