= Sony MDR-V6 =

Foldable large-diaphragm headphones

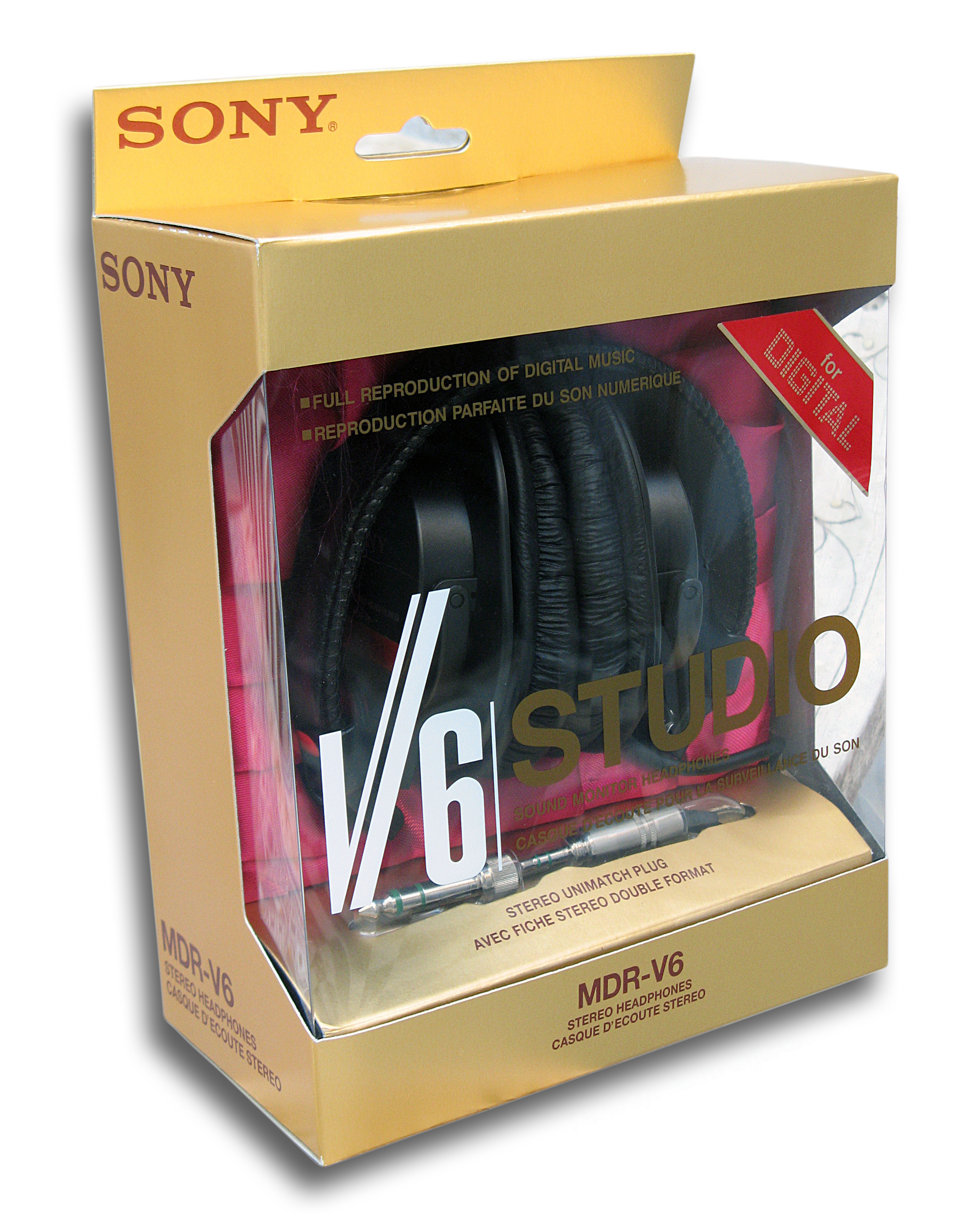
Sony MDR-V6 in its old retail box

Sony MDR-V6 is a folding pair of large-diaphragm headphones, the initial entry in Sony's Studio Monitor headphones, one of the most popular model lines among professional audio engineers. The product line was augmented by the MDR-V600, the MDR-7506 and then the MDR-7509 and MDR-7509HD models, which continue to be popular for audio editing, live sound and broadcast applications.

The four models use a closed, circumaural sealed-ear design with a coiled oxygen-free copper cord, tipped with a combination 1/4 inch (6.4 mm) and 1/8 in (3.2 mm) mini TRS phone connector. As a product line, the MDR-series Studio Monitor folding headphones have been noted as a "favorite of sound professionals because they're reasonably flat sounding, inexpensive, compact, and they can take a lot of punishment." The MDR prefix is an initialism of the Micro Dynamic Receiver trademark.

== MDR-V6 ==
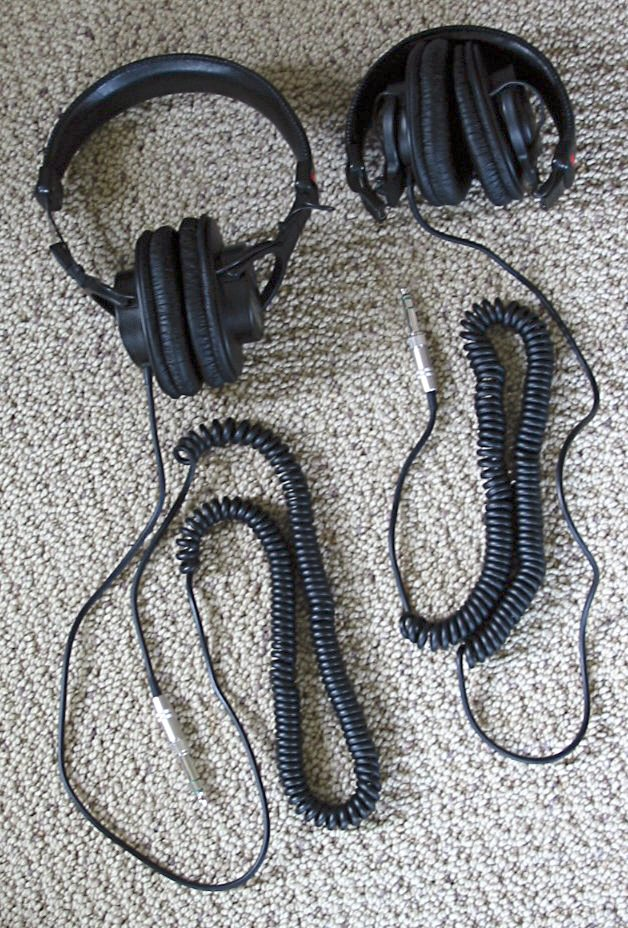
Two MDR-V6s, one folded for travel

The MDR-V6 was introduced in 1985 and became popular with sound engineers and disc jockeys (DJs). The headphones were listed as having a very wide frequency response and were convenient for travel as they could be folded and carried in an included leatherette bag. In 1987, audio industry journalist Daniel Kumin wrote, "Throw away your loudspeakers. There is now what may be the most perfect transducer yet made by man. Recently I auditioned a pair of Sony MDR-V6 Studio Monitor headphones, then purchased them. There are not enough superlatives in the dictionary to describe the performance of these headphones. Listening to them with a good CD recording is like being in the center of a live performance." Consumer Reports wrote in 1989 that "there seems little reason to look beyond the check-rated Sony MDR-V6. That model combines the highest accuracy we've measured in headphones, comfortable design, moderate weight, and enviable bass reproduction."

In 1993, the headphones were described as "almost-industry-standard" for the monitoring of location sound recording for film and television. Newer designs were introduced by Sony, most notably the MDR-V600, yet the MDR-V6 continued to be produced. By 2003, the headphones were so well known that Electronic Musician magazine, recommending headphones with a "fold-up design", called the MDR-V6 "venerable". In a comparison of many headphones models, Dave Rat introduced them as "one of the most popular live sound headphones", and tested them to be "a little low on the top end, a little low on the bottom; definitely close" to neutrally flat.

After 35 years, Sony discontinued manufacturing the MDR-V6 in 2020.

== MDR-V600 ==
First reviewed in 1993, the MDR-V600 was designed to satisfy DJs who wanted a greater emphasis on bass. To help DJs in cuing songs with one ear, the MDR-V600's earcups can be swiveled around backwards. In a test of virtual surround on a portable DVD player, using the movie House of Flying Daggers, the MDR-V600 was praised: "the imaging, separation, and clarity of sound was impressive".

== MDR-7506 ==
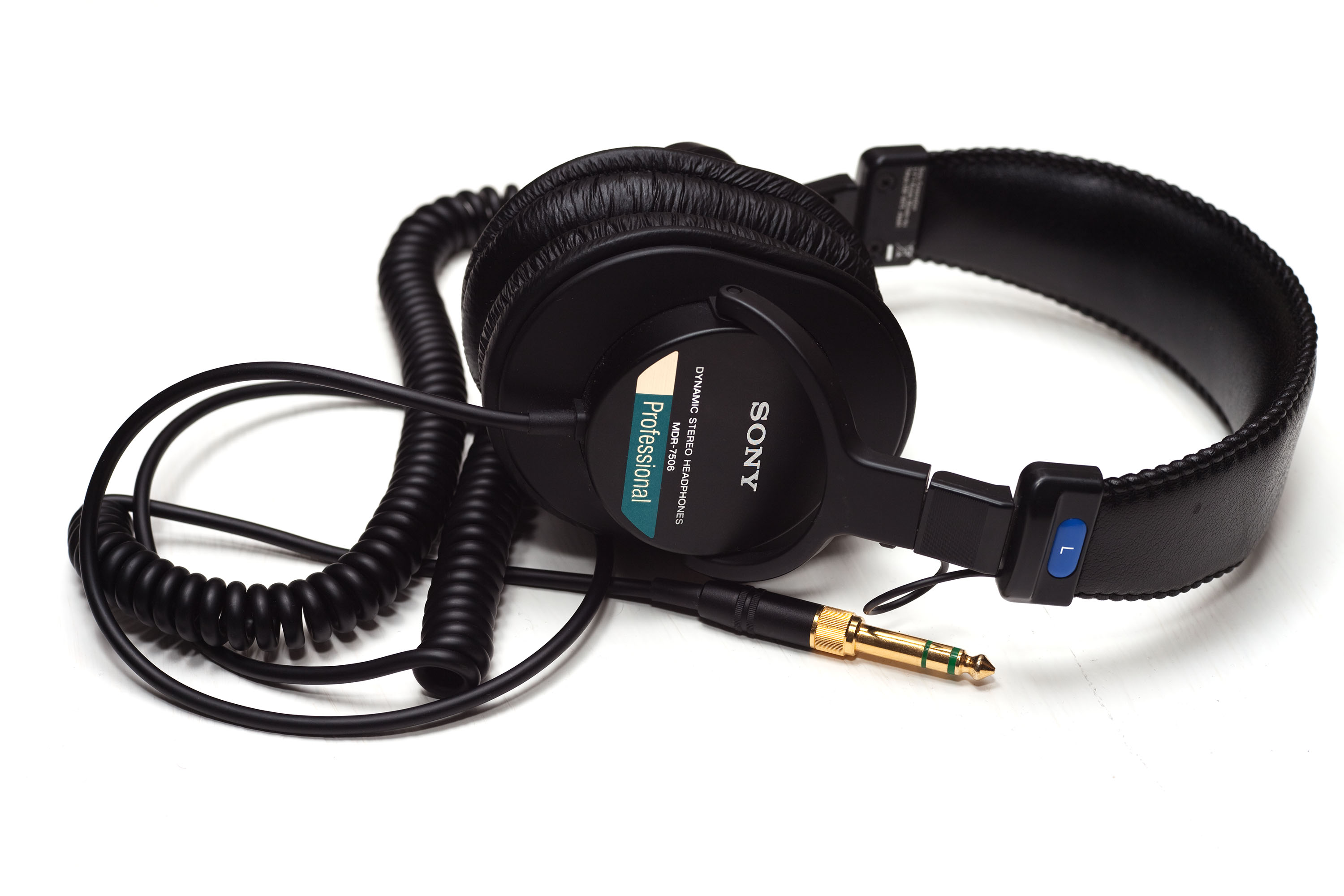
MDR-7506

In 1991, Sony introduced the MDR-7506 headphones, which were marketed to audio professionals.

The MDR-7506 and the MDR-V6 share the same part number for their driver and all other parts (except gold-plated 1/4 in and 3.5 mm connectors, and earcup covers embossed with model numbers), but the magnet therein is known to vary according to various Sony documentation. The MDR-7506 was introduced with a samarium–cobalt magnet, as was originally used in the MDR-V6. However, at some point, the MDR-7506 switched to the slightly more powerful neodymium magnet. These changes were made without changing the driver part number. In addition, Sony's own store website specifications for the MDR-V6 also list a neodymium magnet, further calling into question whether the MDR-V6 and MDR-7506 actually use different magnet types in their drivers. The likelihood, therefore, is that Sony at some point updated the magnet in the driver, and it was incorporated into both the '7506 and 'V6.

In 1997, EQ magazine wrote, "Most people will use Sony MDR-V6 or similar headphones, such as the professional version Sony MDR-7506 or Koss Pro-4A. These Sony headphones have a reputation for loud sound and for blocking out at least some outside noise." A 2001 book about web audio described the MDR-7506 as "the industry favorite".

On March 7, 2014, CNET reviewed both headphones. The result was that the V6 had a flat, neutrally balanced sound. The 7506 accentuated its treble range, and had less bass than the V6. The overall sound of the two models was very close.

== MDR-7509HD ==
In Sony's pro line, the now discontinued MDR-7509HD used a larger driver. Truesdell included the MDR-7509HD in his list of "top-of-the-line" headphones for digital audio production, under other models by Bose and Beyerdynamic. In 2008, The Sound Effects Bible listed the earlier MDR-7506 as essential for the "standard recording package", and the MDR-7509HD best suited to the "professional recording package", calling them "top-of-the-line Sony High Definition headphones".

== Specifications ==
	Sony MDR-V6	Sony MDR-V600	Sony MDR-7506	Sony MDR-7509HD	Sony MDR-7510	Sony MDR-7520	Sony MDR-CD900ST	Sony MDR-M1
Type	Circum-aural, closed	Circum-aural, closed	Circum-aural, closed	Circum-aural, closed	Circum-aural, closed	Circum-aural, closed	Circum-aural, closed	Circum-aural, closed
Driver Units	40 mm diameter, dynamic	40 mm dia., dynamic	40 mm dia., dynamic	50 mm dia., dynamic	50 mm dia., dynamic	50 mm dia., dynamic	40 mm dia., dynamic	40 mm dia., dynamic
Impedance	63 ohms at 1 kHz	45 ohms at 1 kHz	63 ohms at 1 kHz	24 ohms at 1 kHz	24 ohms at 1 kHz	24 ohms at 1 kHz	63 ohms at 1 kHz	50 ohms at 1 kHz
Sensitivity	106 dB/mW	106 dB/mW	106 dB/mW	107 dB/mW	106 dB/mW	108 dB/mW	106 dB/mW	102 dB/mW
Frequency Range	5 Hz ~ 30 kHz	5 Hz ~ 30 kHz	10 Hz ~ 20 kHz	5 Hz ~ 80 kHz	5 Hz ~ 40 kHz	5 Hz ~ 80 kHz	5 Hz ~ 30 kHz	5 Hz ~ 80 kHz
Rated Power	0.5 W	0.5 W	0.5 W	1.0 W	1.0 W	1.0 W	0.3 W	
Power handling capacity	1 W	1 W	1 W	3 W	2 W	4 W	1 W	1.5 W
Cord	3 m (extended length) coiled cord	3 m (extended length) coiled cord	3 m (extended length) coiled cord	3 m (extended length) coiled cord	3 m (extended length) coiled cord	3 m (extended length) coiled cord	2.5 m straight cord	1.2 or 2.5 m detachable straight cord
Plug type	Nickel plated stereo unimatch, 1/4" and 1/8"	Gold plated stereo unimatch, 1/4" and 1/8"	Gold plated stereo unimatch, 1/4" and 1/8"	Gold plated stereo unimatch, 1/4" and 1/8"	Gold plated stereo unimatch, 1/4" and 1/8"	Gold plated stereo unimatch, 1/4" and 1/8"	Stereo, 1/4"	Gold plated stereo unimatch, 1/4" and 1/8"
Weight	Approx. 230 g (without cord)	Approx. 260 g (without cord)	Approx. 230 g (without cord)	Approx. 300 g (without cord)	Approx. 260 g (without cord)	Approx. 270 g (without cord)	Approx. 200 g (without cord)	Approx. 216 g (without cord)
