= Phrenology (album) =

Studio album by the Roots
- Released: November 26, 2002
- Recorded: June 2000 – September 2002
- Studio: Electric Lady (New York)
- Genres: Hip-hop; progressive rap; neo soul; rap rock
- Length: 70:17
- Label: MCA
- Producers: Cody Chesnutt; DJ Scratch; Kamal Gray; Kamiah Gray; Karreem Riggins; Kelo Saunders; Omar the Scholar; Questlove; Scott Storch; Tahir Jamal; The Grand Wizzards; Zoukhan Bey

The Roots chronology
| Jay-Z: Unplugged (2001) | Phrenology (2002) | The Tipping Point (2004) |

Singles from Phrenology
- 1. "Break You Off" Released: 2002; 2. "The Seed (2.0)" Released: March 31, 2003

Phrenology is the fifth studio album by American hip-hop band the Roots, released on November 26, 2002, by MCA Records. Recording sessions for the album took place during June 2000 to September 2002 at Electric Lady Studios in New York. It was primarily produced by members of the band and features contributions from hip-hop and neo soul artists such as Cody ChesnuTT, Musiq Soulchild, Talib Kweli, and Jill Scott.

Although it did not parallel the commercial success of the band's previous album, Things Fall Apart, the album reached number 28 on the US Billboard 200 chart and sold steadily, remaining on the chart for 38 weeks. On June 3, 2003, it was certified gold by the Recording Industry Association of America, for shipments of 500,000 copies in the United States. Upon its release, Phrenology received universal acclaim from music critics, who praised its musical direction and lyrical themes, and it was included in numerous publications' year-end lists of the year's best albums.

== Background ==
Following the breakthrough success of Things Fall Apart (1999), its release was highly anticipated and delayed, as recording took two years. The album is named after the discredited pseudoscience of phrenology, the study of head shapes to determine intelligence and character, which was used to rationalize racism during the 19th century in the United States. Its cover art was created by artist/printmaker Tom Huck.

== Music and lyrics ==
Primarily a hip-hop album, Phrenology features lyrical themes of hip-hop culture and its commodification, with musical elements of rock, jazz, techno, hardcore punk, and soul music. According to music critic Greg Kot, the Roots forge a connection between hip-hop and neo soul on the album, while Treble writer says it can "best be described" as progressive rap, and Entertainment Weekly's Raymond Fiore calls it the band's "left-field rock-rap opus". A production of the Soulquarians collective, the album features contributions by Cody ChesnuTT, Musiq Soulchild, Talib Kweli, and Jill Scott.

On "Something in the Way of Things (In Town)", Amiri Baraka performs a poem about how the spirit of death and decay permeates African-American urban experiences. Set to a fusion of several African-American music influences, his poem observes "something in the way of our selves" and uses unusual imagery such as death "riding on top of the car peering through the windshield" and a "Negro squinting at us through the cage" with a smile "that ain't a smile but teeth flying against our necks".

== Critical reception ==
Professional ratings
Aggregate scores
| Source | Rating |
|---|---|
| Metacritic | 87/100 |
Review scores
| Source | Rating |
| AllMusic | 4.5/5 stars |
| Blender | 5/5 stars |
| Entertainment Weekly | B+ |
| The Guardian | 4/5 stars |
| Los Angeles Times | 3.5/4 stars |
| Pitchfork | 8.1/10 |
| Q | 4/5 stars |
| Rolling Stone | 4/5 stars |
| Spin | 8/10 |
| The Village Voice | A− |

Phrenology received widespread acclaim from critics. At Metacritic, which assigns a normalized rating out of 100 to reviews from mainstream publications, the album received an average score of 87, based on 23 reviews. Mojo magazine hailed it as a "masterpiece", while Rolling Stone writer Pat Blashill said it has "a startling array of hip-hop reinventions". Dave Heaton from PopMatters called Phrenology "an impressive, ambitious work" that shows the Roots "filling their sound out and pushing it in a variety of directions", with a form of "tight soul/funk" that "sounds even more exact, funkier and edgier" than on Things Fall Apart. In the Chicago Sun-Times, critic Jim DeRogatis gave the record four out of four stars and called it "a near-classic right out of the gate, an urgent, raucous and thought-provoking 70 minutes that mine the musical territory between hard hip-hop and smoother Philly soul". Blender's RJ Smith called it "a celebration of self-determination, a nonstop joyride through some very complicated brains". Jeremy Gladstone from Kludge felt the Roots had combined "complicated beats" with "complex lyrics" to produce a "shockingly honest sound". In The Guardian, Alexis Petridis found the group "exclusively capable of absorbing other genres", while the "more straightforward hip-hop" is "idiosyncratic and hugely enjoyable". Slant Magazine's Sal Cinquemani called the album "subtly progressive" and felt the lyrics "challenge the commodification and subsequent destruction of hip-hop culture".

In a less enthusiastic review, Uncut magazine said Phrenology shows the Roots' "willingness to push the envelope of their organic jazz-rap" that is unparalleled but sometimes musically pretentious or indulgent, particularly on "Something in the Way of Things" and the coda to "Water". AllMusic editor Steve Huey felt it is "a challenging, hugely ambitious opus that's by turns brilliant and bewildering, as it strains to push the very sound of hip-hop into the future." He also called it the band's "hardest-hitting" album because they successfully "re-create their concert punch in the studio." In his column for The Village Voice, Robert Christgau believed the Roots have finally discovered how to write tuneful and structured music on Phrenology, as they "humanize their formal commitment with injections of singing and guitar".

At the end of 2002, Phrenology was named one of the year's best albums. It was voted the seventh best album of 2002 in The Village Voice's Pazz & Jop, an annual poll of American critics. The Rolling Stone Album Guide (2004) later gave it four-and-a-half stars and cited "Water" as a highlight, "that begins with the age-old Bo Diddley beat and ends as an extended musique concrète-style instrumental fantasia". Phrenology was included in the 2010 reference book 1001 Albums You Must Hear Before You Die and in Tom Moon's 1000 Recordings to Hear Before You Die (2008). Slant Magazine listed the album at number 231 on its "Top 250 Albums of the 2000s" (2010).

== Track listing ==
Information is adapted from the album's liner notes. "(co.)" denotes Co-producer. Track numbers continued from Things Fall Apart.

| No. | Title | Writer(s) | Producer(s) | Length |
|---|---|---|---|---|
| 87. | "Phrentrow" (featuring Ursula Rucker) | Ahmir Thompson; Rucker; Omar Edwards | Questlove; Omar the Scholar | 0:18 |
| 88. | "Rock You" | Tariq Trotter; George Spivey | DJ Scratch; The Grand Wizzards (co.) | 3:12 |
| 89. | "!!!!!!!" | Thompson; Benjamin Kenney; Leonard Hubbard | The Grand Wizzards | 0:24 |
| 90. | "Sacrifice" (featuring Nelly Furtado) | Trotter; Thompson; James Gray; Hubbard | Kamiah Gray; Kamal Gray (co.) | 4:44 |
| 91. | "Rolling with Heat" (featuring Talib Kweli) | Trotter; Thompson; Gray; Kyle Jones; Talib Greene; Karl Jenkins | The Grand Wizzards | 3:42 |
| 92. | "WAOK (Ay) Rollcall" (featuring Ursula Rucker) | Thompson; Gray; Hubbard | The Grand Wizzards | 1:00 |
| 93. | "Thought @ Work" | Trotter; Thompson; Hubbard; Gray; Kenney | Questlove | 4:58 |
| 94. | "The Seed (2.0)" (featuring Cody ChesnuTT) | Trotter; Antonious Bernard Thomas | Questlove; Cody ChesnuTT (co.) | 4:27 |
| 95. | "Break You Off" (featuring Musiq) | Trotter; Thompson; Hubbard; Gray; Jones; Kenney; Jenkins; Taalib Johnson; Jill Scott | Kamal Gray | 7:27 |
| 96. | "Water" | Trotter; Thompson; Hubbard; Gray; Kenney; Tahir Williams | Tahir Jamal; Kelo Saunders (co.); The Grand Wizzards (co.) | 10:24 |
| 97. | "Quills" | Trotter; Karriem Riggins | Karreem Riggins; The Grand Wizzards (co.) | 4:22 |
| 98. | "Pussy Galore" | Trotter; Scott Storch | Scott Storch; Zoukhan Bey | 4:29 |
| 99. | "Complexity" (featuring Jill Scott) | Trotter; Thompson; Hubbard; Gray; Scott; Edwards | The Grand Wizzards; Questlove (co.); Omar the Scholar (co.) | 4:47 |
| 100. | "Something in the Way of Things (In Town)" (featuring Amiri Baraka) | Thompson; Kenney; Baraka | The Grand Wizzards | 7:16 |

Unlisted tracks
| No. | Title | Writer(s) | Producer(s) | Length |
|---|---|---|---|---|
| 101. | "Rhymes and Ammo" (featuring Talib Kweli) | Trotter; Thompson; Greene | The Grand Wizzards | 4:32 |
| 102. | "Thirsty!" | | | 2:47 |

Sample credits and notes

- "Thought @ Work" contains elements from the composition "Apache" by The Sugarhill Gang, "Jam on the Groove" by Ralph McDonald, and "Human Beat Box" by The Fat Boys. According to Questlove, recording artist Alicia Keys "drop[s] in" on the track.
- "Water" comprises three parts, noted in Questlove's liner notes as "a. the first movement / b. the abyss / c. the drowning", and contains elements of "Her Story" by The Flying Lizards.
- "Quills" contains elements of "Breakout" by Swing Out Sister and features guest vocals from Tracey Moore of the Jazzyfatnastees.
- "Pussy Galore" contains elements of "Because I Got It Like That" by the Jungle Brothers.
- On the CD version of the album, there are 18 tracks instead of 16: Tracks 15, 16 and 18 are silent blank tracks. Track 17 starts with another 40 seconds of silence, and after that consists of two untitled songs, identified as "Rhymes and Ammo", originally from Soundbombing III (2002) and featuring Talib Kweli, and "Thirsty!", which is originally a track by Elektrochemie LK called "When I Rock".

== Personnel ==
Credits for Phrenology adapted from Allmusic.

=== Musicians ===
- Black Thought – vocals
- Leonard "Hub" Hubbard - Bass
- Sarah Chun – cello
- Omar Edwards – arp synthesizer
- Nelly Furtado – background vocals
- Michelle Golder – cello
- Kamal Gray – keyboards, theremin, production
- Jef Lee Johnson – guitar
- Alicia Keys – featured artist
- Talib Kweli – vocals
- Malik B. – featured artist
- Tracey Moore – background music
- James Poyser – moog synthesizer, strings
- Questlove – assistant engineer, drums, mixing, production, sequencing
- Rahzel – beatboxing
- Ursula Rucker – featured artist
- Jill Scott – vocals
- James Blood Ulmer – guitar
- Nuah Vi – cello
- Hope Wilson – screams
- Ben Kenney - guitar

=== Production ===
- Jon Adler – assistant
- Pablo Arraya – assistant
- Jim Bottari – engineer
- Andrew Brooks – assistant
- Cody ChesnuTT – producer
- Jeff Chestek – engineer, mixing
- Tom Coyne – assistant, mastering, mixing
- Kareem Da Bawl – producer
- Andre Dandridge – assistant
- DJ Scratch – producer
- Robert "LB" Dorsey – assistant, engineer
- Caliph Gamble – assistant
- Chris Gehringer – mastering
- Gordon Glass – assistant
- Jason Goldstein – mixing
- Kenny J. Gravillis – design
- Tom "Evil Prints" Huck – illustrations
- Ben Kenney – mixing
- Steve Mandel – assistant, engineer
- Carlos "Storm" Martinez – engineer
- James McKrone – assistant
- Shinobu Mitsuoka – assistant
- Kurt Nepogoda – assistant
- Richard Nichols – executive producer, mixing
- Omar the Scholar – producer
- Bob Power – mixing
- Kareem Riggins – producer
- Kelo Saunders – producer
- Jesse Shatkin – assistant
- Jon Smeltz – engineer
- Scott Storch – producer
- Tahir – producer
- Shawn Taylor – assistant
- Steef Van De Gevel – assistant
- Vince Vilorenzo – assistant
- Scott Whiting – assistant
- Ray Wilson – engineer

== Charts ==
=== Weekly charts ===
| Chart (2002–03) | Peak position |
|---|---|
| Canadian Albums (Nielsen SoundScan) | 74 |
| Canadian R&B Albums (Nielsen SoundScan) | 17 |
| Danish Albums (Hitlisten) | 29 |
| Dutch Albums (Album Top 100) | 54 |
| Finnish Albums (Suomen virallinen lista) | 14 |
| French Albums (SNEP) | 117 |
| Italian Albums (FIMI) | 18 |
| Swiss Albums (Schweizer Hitparade) | 57 |
| UK Albums (OCC) | 112 |
| US Billboard 200 | 28 |
| US Top R&B/Hip-Hop Albums (Billboard) | 11 |

=== Year-end charts ===
Year-end chart performance for Phrenology
| Chart (2002) | Position |
|---|---|
| Canadian R&B Albums (Nielsen SoundScan) | 113 |
| Canadian Rap Albums (Nielsen SoundScan) | 63 |

| Chart (2003) | Position |
|---|---|
| US Billboard 200 | 117 |
| US Top R&B/Hip-Hop Albums (Billboard) | 50 |

=== Singles ===
| Song | Chart (2002) | Peak position |
|---|---|---|
| "Break You Off" | UK Singles Chart | 59 |
| "Break You Off" | US Billboard Hot 100 | 99 |
| "Break You Off" | US Hot R&B/Hip-Hop Singles & Tracks | 55 |
| Song | Chart (2003) | Peak position |
| "The Seed (2.0)" | Danish Singles Chart | 2 |
| "The Seed (2.0)" | Dutch Singles Chart | 35 |
| "The Seed (2.0)" | Finnish Singles Chart | 5 |
| "The Seed (2.0)" | German Singles Chart | 67 |
| "The Seed (2.0)" | Swiss Singles Chart | 22 |
| "The Seed (2.0)" | UK Singles Chart | 33 |

== Certifications ==
| Region | Certification | Certified units/sales |
|---|---|---|
| United Kingdom (BPI) | Silver | 60,000^{*} |
| United States (RIAA) | Gold | 500,000^{^} |
^{*} Sales figures based on certification alone.^{^} Shipments figures based on certification alone.

== Bibliography ==
- Brackett, Nathan; Hoard, Christian, eds. (2004). The New Rolling Stone Album Guide: Completely Revised and Updated 4th Edition. Simon and Schuster. ISBN 0-7432-0169-8.
