= Philip Kay =

British composer and producer

Philip Kay is a British contemporary composer and producer. He is also a founding member of the band Working For A Nuclear Free City.

In 2013 Kay won the Music + Sound Award for best composition for his score to The Guardian "Three Little Pigs" long-form commercial. In 2014. he released his debut solo record under the name King Of The Mountains entitled Zoetrope.

Originally from Manchester, England, Kay lives and works in London.

== Discography ==
- Working For A Nuclear Free City - Working For A Nuclear Free City (Melodic Records, 2007)
- Working For A Nuclear Free City - Jojo Burger Tempest (Melodic Records, 2010)
- Motorifik - Secret Things (Modern Language, 2011)
- Gary McClure - Wreaths (AED, 2013)
- King Of The Mountains - Zoetrope (Melodic, 2014)
- Working For A Nuclear Free City - What Do People Do All Day? (Melodic Records, 2016)

== Awards ==
- Cicolope (2017 - Gold) - "The King" for PlayStation; Composer (part of KOM).
- Music and Sound Awards (2017 - Gold) - "The King" for PlayStation; Composer (part of KOM).
- CLIO Awards (2018 - Bronze) - "Major" for Hennessy; Composer (part of KOM).
- Kinsale Shark Awards (2018 - Bronze; Original Music; Music and Sound Craft; International) - "Major" for Hennessy; Composer (part of KOM).
- London International Awards (2018 - Silver; Original Music; Music & Sound) - "Major" for Hennessy; Composer (part of KOM)
- Cicolope (2019 -Gold) "Play Fearlessly" for PlayStation; Composer (part of KOM).
