= Little One Tour =

2011 concert tour by Bilal

- Tour by Bilal
- Associated album: Airtight's Revenge
- Start date: February 2011
- End date: September 16, 2011
- Legs: 3

The Little One Tour is a 2011 concert tour by the American singer-songwriter Bilal, in support of his album Airtight's Revenge. The tour was also used by the singer to promote the charity Autism Speaks and titled after the Airtight's Revenge single "Little One", an ode to his autistic son.

The tour began in February 2011, with shows in the U.S. and Europe, and ended on September 16. On June 18, Bilal headlined along with other acts as part of the Stockholm Jazz Festival and performed two shows in South Africa in August. In addition to Airtight's Revenge, Bilal performed songs from his unreleased second album Love for Sale, which had developed a cult following.

== Opening Acts ==
- N'dambi US Leg (select dates)
- Rich Medina US Leg (select dates)

== Set list ==
Bilal's set list changes almost every gig, however these are songs he has performed on the tour:

1. "Free" (Intro)
2. "Gotsta Be Cool"
3. "For You"
4. "Reminsce"
5. "Love Poems"
6. "All for Love"
7. "Something To Hold On To"
8. "Lord Don't Let It"
9. "Cake & Eat It Too"
10. "Think It Over"
11. "Since I've Been Loving You
12. "Sometimes"
13. "Robots"
14. "The Dollar"
15. "Levels"
16. "All Matter"
17. "Flying"
18. "Make Me Over"
19. "Little One"
20. "Tainted Love"
21. "White Turns to Grey"
22. "Soul Sista"

== Band ==
- Music Director/Drums: Steve McKie
- Bass: Conley "Tone" Whitfield
- Keyboards: Corey Bernhard
- Guitar: Michael Severson
- Background vocals: Chris Turner

== Tour dates ==
Date	City	Country	Venue
North America
February 14, 2011	Atlanta	United States	CenterStage
February 20, 2011	Montclair	United States	Lackawanna Plaza
March 5, 2011	Chicago	United States	The Shrine
Europe
April 3, 2011	Paris	France	Cabaret Sauvage
April 5, 2011	Ghent	Belgium	Concertzaal Vooruit
April 6, 2011	Cologne	Germany	Club Bahnhof
April 8, 2011	Amsterdam	Netherlands	Paradiso
April 9, 2011	Rotterdam	Netherlands	Heidegger
April 10, 2011	London	United Kingdom	The Jazz Café
North America
April 14, 2011	New York City	United States	S.O.B's
April 21, 2011	Washington, D.C.	United States	The Park 14th
June 5, 2011	Columbia	United States	Merriweather Post Pavilion
Europe
June 18, 2011	Stockholm	Sweden	Skansen
North America
July 23, 2011	Atlanta	United States	Variety Playhouse
Europe
July 3, 2011	Montreux	Switzerland	Miles Davis Hall
North America
July 22, 2011	Birmingham	United States	Platinum
July 23, 2011	Atlanta	United States	CenterStage
July 24, 2011	Raleigh	United States	TJ's
July 28, 2011	Charlotte	United States	Club Tempo
July 30, 2011	Wilmington	United States	The Queen
July 31, 2011	Pittsburgh	United States	Obsessions
Africa
August 5, 2011	Johannesburg	South Africa	The O.S.T
August 6, 2011	Cape Town	South Africa	The Assembly
North America
August 12, 2011	Indianapolis	United States	Madame Walker Theatre Center
August 14, 2011	Columbia	United States	Merriweather Post Pavilion
August 17, 2011	St. Louis	United States	Old Rock House
August 19, 2011	Dallas	United States	The Door
August 20, 2011	Houston	United States	Mekong Underground
August 21, 2011	Austin	United States	Mojo's
August 22, 2011	Oakland	United States	New Parish Music Hall
August 26, 2011	Los Angeles	United States	El Rey Theatre
August 27, 2011	San Francisco	United States	Mezzanine
August 28, 2011	Sacramento	United States	Harlow's
August 29, 2011	Oakland	United States	New Parish
August 30, 2011	San Diego	United States	Anthology
August 31, 2011	Fresno	United States	Fulton 55
September 1, 2011	Costa Mesa	United States	Detroit Bar
September 2, 2011	Denver	United States	Soiled Dove
September 3, 2011	Kansas City	United States	TBA
September 4, 2011	Chicago	United States	Double Door
September 5, 2011	Chicago	United States	Double Door
September 6, 2011	Cleveland	United States	Beachland Ballroom
September 8, 2011	Baltimore	United States	SoundStage
September 10, 2011	Richmond	United States	TBA
September 11, 2011	Alexandria	United States	The Birchmere
September 15, 2011	Philadelphia	United States	World Cafe Live
September 16, 2011	New York City	United States	B.B. King Blues Club
