= All Matter =

Single by Bilal

from the album Airtight's Revenge
- Released: September 14, 2010
- Genre: Art-funk; soul
- Length: 5:20
- Label: Plug Research
- Songwriter(s): Bilal Oliver
- Producer(s): Bilal Oliver, Steve McKie

Bilal singles chronology
"Restart" (2010)	"All Matter" (2010)	"Little One" (2010)

"All Matter" is a song by American singer-songwriter Bilal. The song was produced by the singer, along with Steve McKie, for his 2010 album Airtight's Revenge. It is a rerecording of his collaboration with Robert Glasper, which was included in Glasper's 2009 album Double-Booked. The original version - with Glasper - was nominated for the 52nd Grammy Awards, in the Best Urban/Alternative Performance category. HipHopDX journalist Luke Gibson cites it as the best-written song from Airtight's Revenge.

== Music and lyrics ==
Writing for Time Out New York, Mikael Wood describes the music of "All Matter" as "TV on the Radio-style art-funk" and an example of Bilal traversing different styles throughout the album "with the headstrong self-assurance of someone whose commercial aspirations trail his creative ones". While Bilal's falsetto vocals are sung soulfully and in midtempo, they are arranged against beats played in an aggressive and fast manner. David Dacks, in Exclaim!, highlights the song as an example of how "Bilal's reedy, Sly [Stone]-meets-Prince voice runs down metaphysical and personal subjects overtop a continuously changing musical landscape". The lyrics, described by the writer Adrienne Maree Brown as "a meditation on being at peace with every single thing about existence", are sung as follows:

We're all the same
and all so very different
Divine by design,
it all intertwines
Ain't nothing new
but it’s always changing, movin'
Still waters soft yet so hard
So what is love?…
Cool on the outside
Hot in the middle but
You ain't even gotta try,
all you gotta do is realize
It’s all matter
A speck of dust in this vast universe
Just like a raindrop
in the sea of consciousness
It's all matter…
It's everything it ought to be
It's everything it needs to be, ok
Don't stand in the way
You'll only make it hard
Just keep it flowing
Flow with the ocean and you'll be just where you should be

Consequently, Brown likens the song to a "soul sung version" of "A Hopi Elder Speaks", a piece of writing attributed to an unnamed Hopi elder. The lyric describing love as "cool on the outside, hot in the middle" is interpreted by The A.V. Club's Nathan Rabin as reflective of the overriding concept in Airtight's Revenge, which Rabin says is "Bilal alternating between a delicate, Prince-like falsetto and an impassioned growl as he contemplates romantic and professional pain".
