= A Love Surreal =

Studio album by Bilal
- Released: February 26, 2013
- Studios: Brooklyn Recording; Breeding Grounds (Brooklyn); Lalabelle Music; Lamont Caldwell's Bedroom (Clifton); Pine (Philadelphia); Prime Rib Productions; The Krusty Lab (Los Angeles)
- Genres: R&B; avant-soul; neo soul; jazz; funk
- Length: 52:53
- Label: eOne Music
- Producers: Bilal; Shafiq Husayn; Steve McKie; Mike Severson; Paris Strother; Conley "Tone" Whitfield

Bilal chronology
Airtight's Revenge (2010)	A Love Surreal (2013)	In Another Life (2015)

Singles from A Love Surreal
- 1. "Back to Love" Released: December 11, 2012

A Love Surreal is the third studio album by American singer-songwriter Bilal. It was released on February 26, 2013, by eOne Music, his first album for the label.

Bilal recorded the album in five months in sessions at studios in Brooklyn, Clifton, Philadelphia, and Los Angeles. He was joined by most of the recording crew from his 2010 album Airtight's Revenge, including producer Shafiq Husayn, drummer Steve McKie, and pianist Robert Glasper. The singer wrote and produced most of A Love Surreal, which he titled in reference to his unreleased second album Love for Sale and John Coltrane's 1965 album A Love Supreme.

A Love Surreal explores different stages of love in a cycle of slow-burning songs that Bilal wrote with female listeners in mind. The songs abandon the personal and societal themes of Airtight's Revenge in favor of lyrics about cultivating a romance and meditative laments on its dissolution. Musically, Bilal wanted to make the album sound multidimensional and drew on the surrealist art of Salvador Dalí for inspiration, while incorporating sounds from R&B, funk, jazz, rock, hip hop, electronica, and psychedelic music.

Bilal premiered songs from the album in his performance at World Cafe Live in Philadelphia. Its lead single "Back to Love" was released on December 11, 2012. A Love Surreal received widespread acclaim from critics, who praised Bilal's expressive singing, clever songwriting, and mellow musical style.

== Background ==
Having written his 2010 album Airtight's Revenge with themes from a male perspective, Bilal attempted to write A Love Surreal with lyrics about love for the perspective of female listeners. He describes writing the album as a surrealistic exploration of love, inspired by the surrealism of Spanish painter Salvador Dalí, having viewed a 2005 exhibit of his work at the Philadelphia Museum of Art. He also drew on the shelving of his unreleased album Love for Sale, which inspired A Love Surreal's title. "For the longest I was supposed to sign with [eOne Music] and actually put Love for Sale out, but you know, things happen", Bilal told Okayplayer. "It's surreal that I'm right back at the same spot about to put out a record with them. Also, surreal – the word surrealism – my inspiration for this record." Bilal had wanted to sign with eOne because of the artistic freedom the label had given fellow recording artist Dwele. The album's title was also inspired by John Coltrane's 1965 album A Love Supreme.

== Recording and production ==
I got a lot of concepts from Salvador Dali and the way he made his art pieces, it almost looks three-dimensional, and I wanted to do that with the sound of this album. So this record is almost like a sonic art piece.

— Bilal (2013)

Bilal used Logic software to prepare the songs he had written and proceeded to record A Love Surreal in five months, which he said was the fastest he had recorded an album. Recording sessions for the album took place at Brooklyn Recording and Breeding Grounds Studio in Brooklyn, New York; Lalabelle Music and Lamont Caldwell's Bedroom in Clifton, New Jersey; Pine Studios in Philadelphia, Pennsylvania; and Prime Rib Productions and The Krusty Lab in Los Angeles, California. He recorded his vocals at a beach-side studio in Los Angeles.

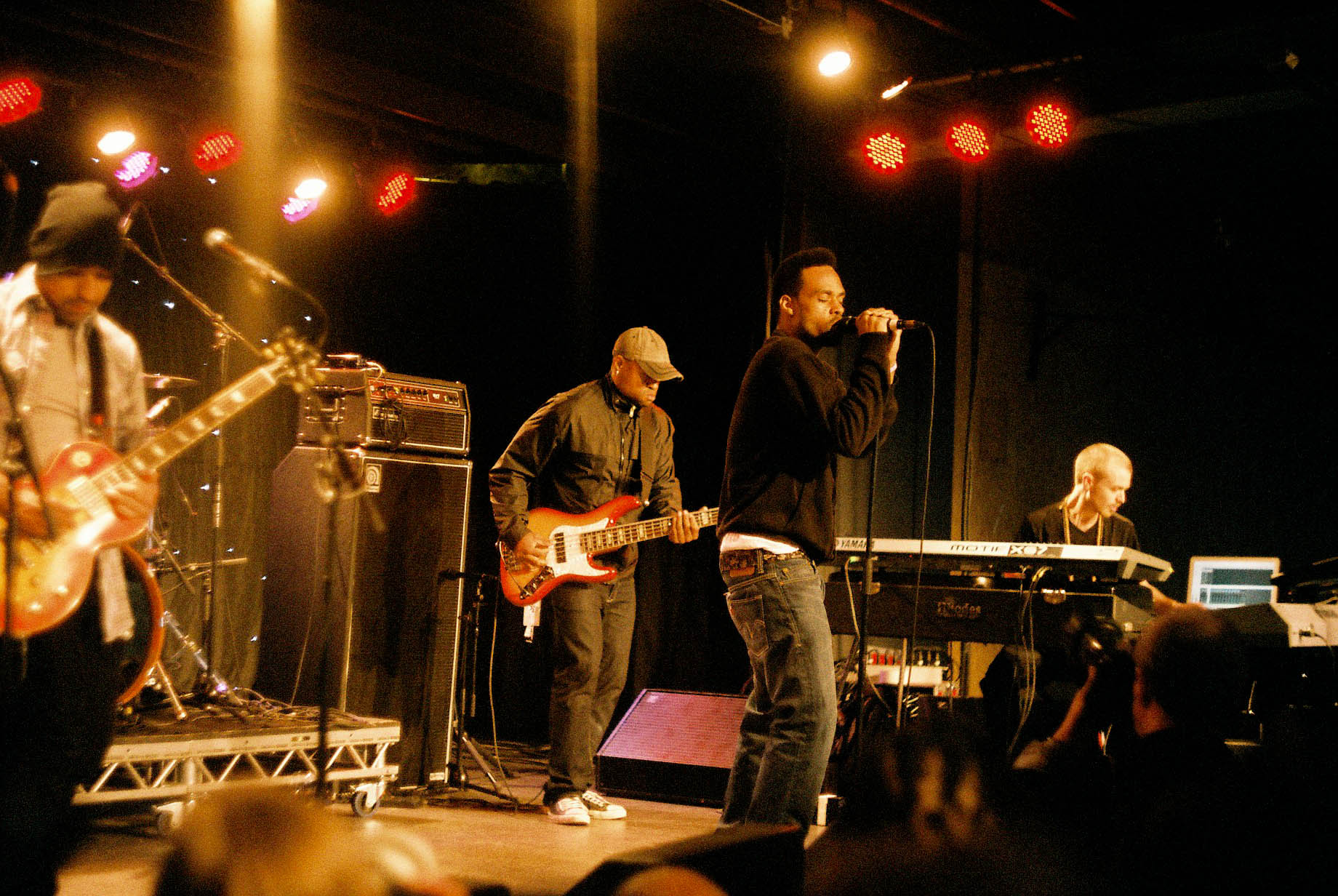
Bilal (center right) recorded with a guitar-bass-keyboard-drum lineup.

Bilal originally intended to record A Love Surreal as an extended play when he entered the studio, but, according to him, "it was just so easy that the music started to flow ... by the fifth day we were like 'damn, we made a mistake and wrote five extra songs.'" He worked with most of the recording crew from Airtight's Revenge and produced 10 of the album's 14 songs. Bilal viewed that his role as a producer had progressed from his debut album 1st Born Second (2001) to A Love Surreal, which he felt best conveyed his vision for an album's sound.

Bilal recorded the song "Butterfly" with Robert Glasper, a friend of his since college who had played on each of his albums. Bilal had previously worked with Glasper on the latter's 2012 album Black Radio. For the song "Back to Love", Bilal originally programmed the music's drums on his Logic, but decided to record them live after bringing in other musicians at Pine Studios in Philadelphia. While recording "Astray", he persuaded his drummer to play in the parking lot and record him live, which he recalled in an interview for The Huffington Post: "I just had this feeling in my head like, 'man, I want this shit to feel big!' And when I would park my car in the parking lot, the acoustics in there made you feel like was a Catholic church with all of the sounds echoing off of everything."

== Music and lyrics ==
Musically, A Love Surreal is lighter and mellower than Airtight's Revenge, while deemphasizing electronics in its production. The music is characterized by subtle melodic hooks, muted drum programming, glimmering keyboards, sparse indie rock guitars, and defined jazz piano. The songs are interspersed with long instrumental sections during which Bilal croons wordlessly, while doubling and tripling his voice. His singing veers between a soulful baritone and supple falsetto. Bilal's sense of melody and harmony is informed by past operatic and jazz training, and his reverence for atmospheric psychedelic soul albums.

"Slipping Away"
The "chilling torch song" showcases Bilal's jazz-informed singing.

According to John Murph from DownBeat, Bilal's jazz-school background informs "his avant-soul music". Evan Rytlewski of Paste observes unconventional applications of jazz throughout A Love Surreal, but characterizes it foremost as a neo soul album due to its "heady, post-Dilla hip-hop thump and periodic psychedelic drift". Q calls the music "cosmic R&B". According to SoulTracks writer L. Michael Gipson, "the material is often jazz, funk, rock, hip hop, electronica and R&B all at once, with funk dominating the hot chicken grease feel of several 'jam session' cuts and Bilal's Rick James meets Prince vocal approach."

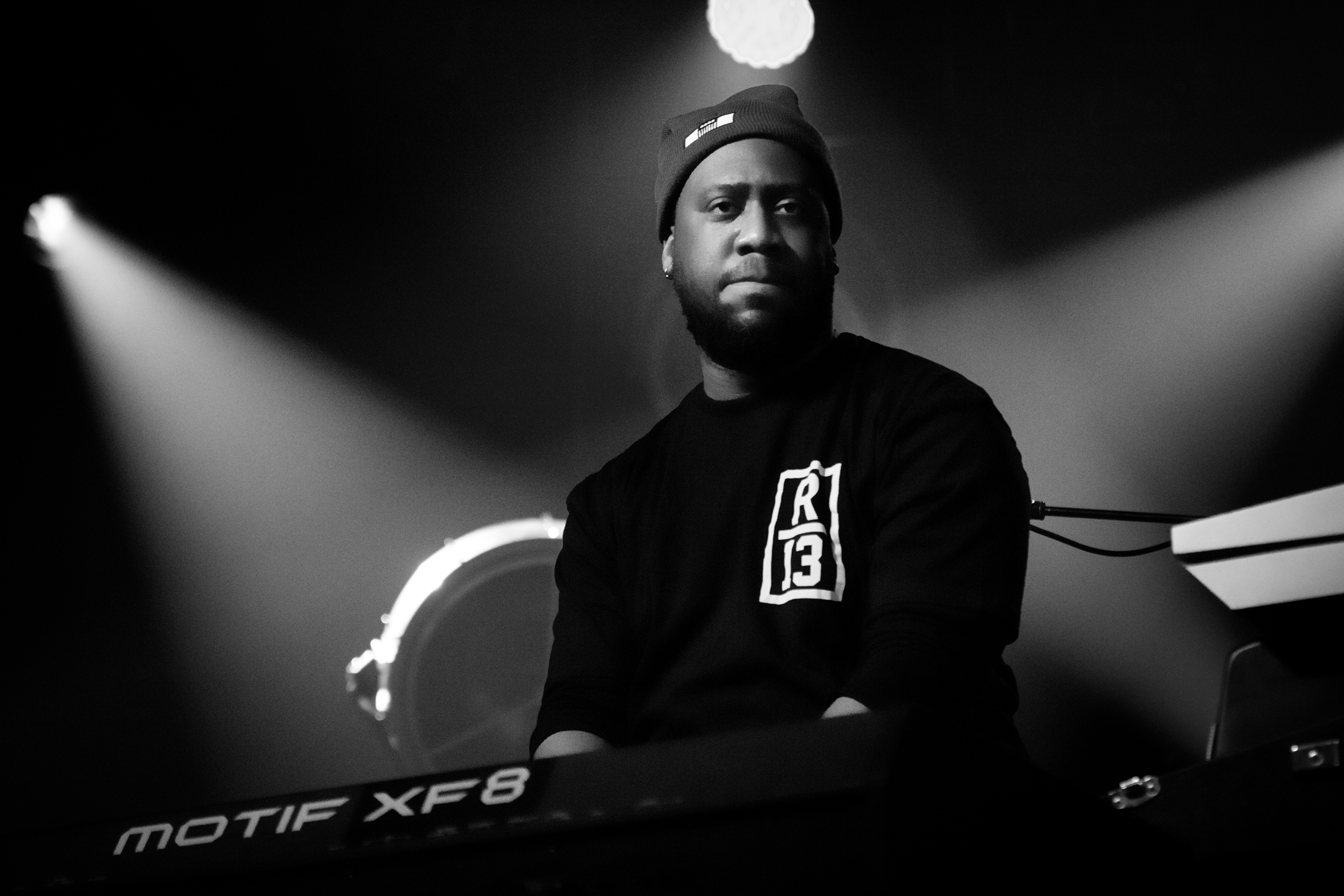
"Butterfly" and "The Flow" feature Robert Glasper playing keyboards.

A Love Surreal comprises a cycle of slow-burning songs about different stages of love, including infatuation, seduction, romance, estrangement, longing, recovery, and solace. Bilal's intimate lyrics address love's ephemeral nature and how to sustain happiness. The album veers between danceable, upbeat songs about cultivating a new romance and bluesy, meditative songs about how romances dissolve. In contrast to Airtight's Revenge, A Love Surreal deals more with feelings of lust and flirting rather than personal and societal issues.

The album's opening series of songs have straightforward lyrics, according to Phillip Mlynar of Spin. On "West Side Girl", Bilal flatteringly remarks on his date's shoes, backed by a bubbling funk groove. The next song, "Back to Love", draws on the music of Prince, while the jazz guitar licks of "Winning Hand" draw influence from Steely Dan. "Climbing" has a rugged beat and a lyrical allusion to The Notorious B.I.G.'s 1993 song "Party and Bullshit". The middle section of the album explores broader emotions and themes of loss and lament. "Slipping Away" is a slow-building meditation on loss, with sentimental music backing the narrator's plea to a departing love. On the slow burning pop rock song "Lost for Now", he comes to terms with being alone and leaves town, but finds salvation in "a smile that changes everything" as the song closes with a shimmer of cymbal. The stark ballad "Butterfly" is built around Bilal's soaring falsetto and Glasper's rippling piano. Its music explores jazz, and also features dreamy Moog accents. The album closes with lyrics about the promise of tomorrow: "Woke up this morning to the sound of a bluebird singing / Suddenly I knew just where to begin / Something so simple / How can it speak so loud to me?"

== Release and reception ==
Professional ratings
Aggregate scores
Source	Rating
Metacritic	82/100
Review scores
Source	Rating
AllMusic	4.5/5 stars
Exclaim!	9/10
HipHopDX	4.5/5
Los Angeles Times	2.5/4 stars
Paste	8.8/10
Pitchfork	7.6/10
PopMatters	8/10
Q	3/5 stars
Spin	8/10
USA Today	4/4 stars

In anticipation of the album's release, Bilal released a free mixtape called The Retrospection through his Facebook page on December 6, 2012. "Back to Love" was released as the lead single from A Love Surreal on December 11, and on January 8, 2013, a music video for the song was released online. On February 13, Bilal performed on World Cafe Live in Philadelphia, playing music from A Love Surreal for the first time. The album was released on February 26 by eOne.

A Love Surreal was met with widespread critical acclaim. At Metacritic, which assigns a normalized rating out of 100 to reviews from professional publications, the album received an average score of 82, based on 11 reviews. It was hailed by Exclaim! magazine's Ryan B. Patrick as "a breezily solid R&B/soul affair that shows Bilal in fine form". AllMusic's Andy Kellman said Bilal had improved as a producer and songwriter while remaining "supernaturally skilled and creative" as a vocalist, "swooping, diving, wailing, and sighing, all with complete command". Paste magazine's Evan Rytlewski said "for the first time in his career, Bilal no longer sounds like an artist with entirely too much to prove; he's just a great singer, backed by great players he puts to good use on a set of sticky, deceptively inventive songs." Writing for NPR, Ann Powers said A Love Surreal "cultivates the stratospheric vibe" of Coltrane's A Love Supreme while Bilal's ambition is "grounded in fierce intelligence and a commitment to letting stories unfold all the way to their sometimes sorrowful, sometimes orgasmic end". Ken Capobianco of The Boston Globe called it "bracingly good", "compelling music" that allows Bilal's "falsetto to bring the intimate lyrics to life". In The New York Times, Jon Pareles said his "full-fledged" voice "needs no studio aid" on songs that "tease and insinuate" with "meanderings [that] lead somewhere".

Some reviewers were less receptive. Pitchfork journalist Jayson Greene said it is a "joy" to listen to Bilal "warp his voice into improbable shapes", but believed the music lacks any prominent melodies. Mikael Wood of the Los Angeles Times was more critical of the closing series of slow jams and "atmospheric clutter", while writing that the album's best songs "warrant the increased attention" in Bilal. Jazz critic Tom Hull gave the album a B-plus and found it "nice", but suggested it may also be too subtle.

== Track listing ==
Information is taken from the album's liner notes.

No.	Title	Writer(s)	Producer(s)	Length
1.	"Intro"	Bilal Oliver	Bilal Oliver	1:07
2.	"West Side Girl"	Stephen Bruner, A. Collins, J. Collins, Shafiq Husayn, Oliver	Shafiq Husayn	3:28
3.	"Back to Love"	Corey Bernhard, H. Davis, Steve McKie, Oliver, Mike Severson, Conley Whitfield	Bilal Oliver, Steve McKie (co.), Conley "Tone" Whitfield (co.), Mike Severson (co.), Corey Bernhard (co.)	3:11
4.	"Winning Hand"	Bernhard, Davis, McKie, Oliver, Severson, Whitfield	Bilal Oliver, Steve McKie (co.), Conley "Tone" Whitfield (co.), Mike Severson (co.), Corey Bernhard (co.)	5:23
5.	"Climbing"	Bernhard, Davis, McKie, Oliver	Steve McKie, Corey Bernhard (co.)	3:24
6.	"Longing and Waiting"	Bernhard, McKie, Oliver, Severson, Whitfield	Bilal Oliver, Steve McKie (co.), Conley "Tone" Whitfield (co.), Mike Severson (co.), Corey Bernhard (co.)	3:54
7.	"Right at the Core"	Oliver, Paris Strother	Bilal Oliver, Paris Strother	3:34
8.	"Slipping Away"	Bernhard, McKie, Oliver, Severson, Whitfield	Bilal Oliver, Steve McKie (co.), Conley "Tone" Whitfield (co.), Mike Severson (co.), Corey Bernhard (co.)	5:57
9.	"Lost for Now"	McKie, Ben O'Neil, Oliver	Steve McKie, Ben O'Neil (co.)	3:36
10.	"Astray"	Davis, McKie, Oliver	Bilal Oliver, Steve McKie (co.), Conley "Tone" Whitfield (co.), Mike Severson (co.), Corey Bernhard (co.)	4:14
11.	"Never Be the Same"	Oliver, Whitfield	Conley "Tone" Whitfield	3:20
12.	"Butterfly" (featuring Robert Glasper)	Robert Glasper, Oliver	Bilal Oliver	6:41
13.	"The Flow"	Michelle Bell, Bernhard, McKie, Oliver, Severson, Whitfield	Bilal Oliver, Steve McKie (co.), Conley "Tone" Whitfield (co.), Mike Severson (co.), Corey Bernhard (co.)	3:58
14.	"Outro"	Oliver	Bilal Oliver	1:06

• (co.) Co-producer

== Personnel ==
Credits are adapted from the liner notes.

- Marc Baptiste – photography
- Corey Bernhard – keyboards, producer, strings
- Commissioner Gordon – mixing, mixing engineer
- Bekah Connolly – A&R
- Shawnte Crespo – product manager
- Aaron Draper – percussion
- Paul Grosso – creative director
- Danielle Harwood – A&R
- Halley Hiatt – assistant
- Derrick Hodge – bass
- Shafiq Husayn – producer
- Russell Johnson – executive producer
- Tariq Khan – engineer
- George Littlejohn – executive producer
- Sean Marlowe – art direction, design
- Steve McKie – associate producer, drums, engineer, producer
- Giovanna Melchiorre – publicity
- Arnold Mischkulnig – mastering
- Ben O'Neil – electric guitar, producer
- Bilal Oliver – executive producer, producer, vocals
- Andre Pickney – bass
- Mike Severson – acoustic guitar, guitar, producer
- Paris Strother – keyboards, producer
- Hanif Sumner – publicity
- Julia Sutowski – coordinating producer
- Andrew Taub – engineer
- Dontay Thompson – promoter
- Maurice White – promoter
- Conley "Tone" Whitfield – bass, drums, engineer, guitar, producer, vocal engineer

== Charts ==
Chart (2013)	Peak position
U.S. Billboard 200	103
U.S. Independent Albums (Billboard)	17
U.S. Top R&B/Hip-Hop Albums (Billboard)	19
