= Adjust Brightness =

Album by Bilal

Adjust Brightness is an album by American singer Bilal.
