= Bilal (American singer) =

American singer (born 1979)

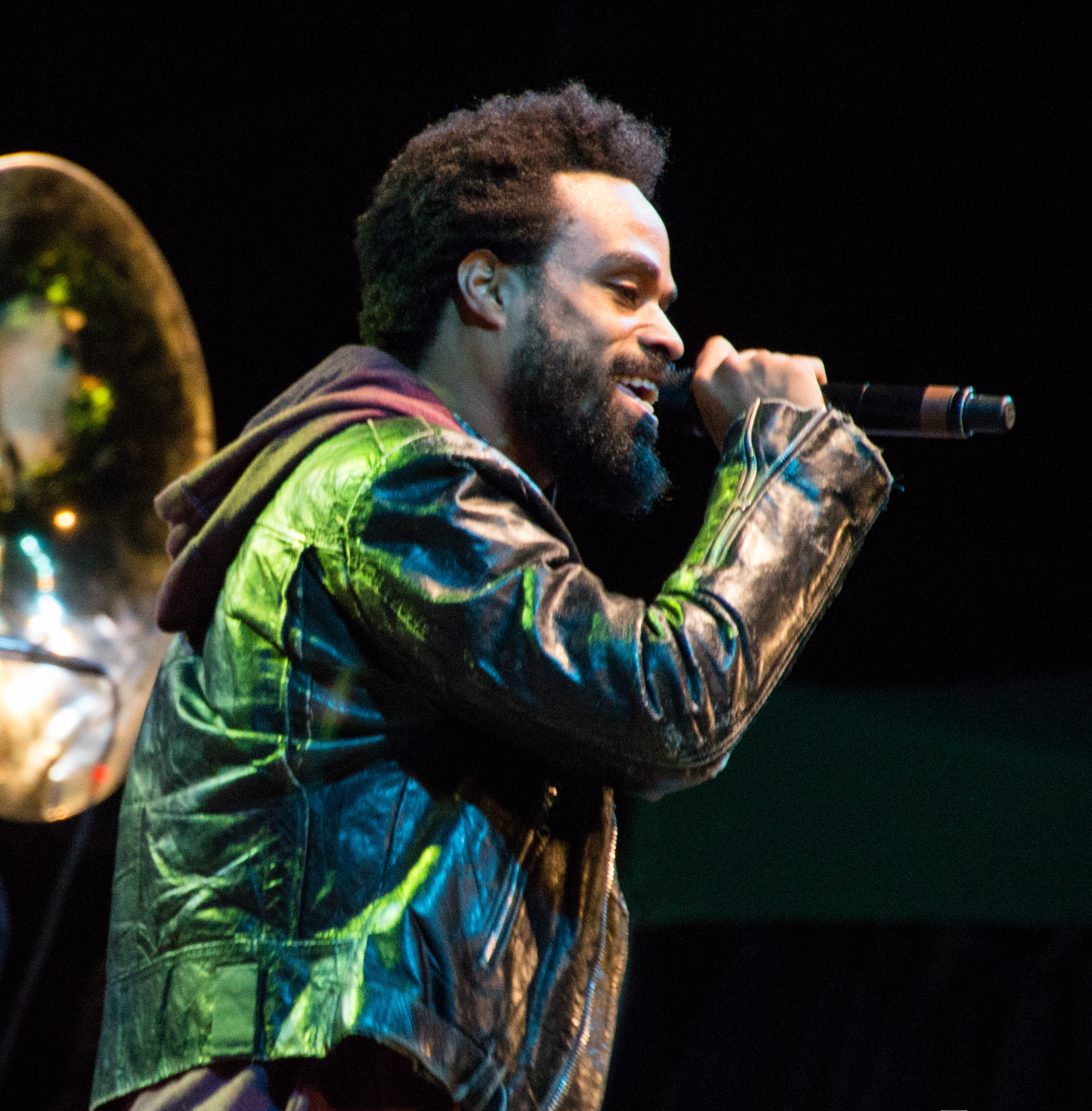
- Bilal at Central Park SummerStage in New York, 2015

Background information
- Also known as: Airtight
- Born: Bilal Sayeed Oliver; August 23, 1979 (age 47); Philadelphia, Pennsylvania, U.S.
- Genres: Progressive soul; neo soul; R&B; Philadelphia soul; jazz; psychedelic soul
- Occupations: Singer; songwriter
- Years active: 1999–present
- Labels: E1; Plug Research; Universal; Interscope; Purpose
- Website: officialbilal.com

Bilal Sayeed Oliver (born August 23, 1979) is an American singer and songwriter. He is an independent artist, noted for his wide vocal range, work across multiple genres, and intense live performances.

Starting out at a major label, Bilal debuted with his popular R&B single "Soul Sista" in 2000, but turned to playing jazz venues and recording more progressive soul music in subsequent years. He has commercially released four albums to critical success, while his unreleased but widely leaked second album Love for Sale also found wide acclaim among critics and listeners. He was a member of the Soulquarians, an experimental black music collective active from the late 1990s to early 2000s. He has been well received, both nationally and internationally, with an extensive list of collaborations including Kendrick Lamar, Common, Erykah Badu, Solange Knowles, Jay-Z, Beyoncé, Guru, Kimbra, J Dilla, Robert Glasper, and The Roots.

In August 2020, during the COVID-19 lockdown, Bilal wrote and recorded his first EP, Voyage-19, over the course of three days and in collaboration with various musicians in remote experimental sessions, which were streamed live on YouTube. The resulting three-track EP was released digitally the following month, with revenues of its sale and accompanying donations given to the participating artists, many of whom had been struggling financially due to the pandemic.

== Early life ==
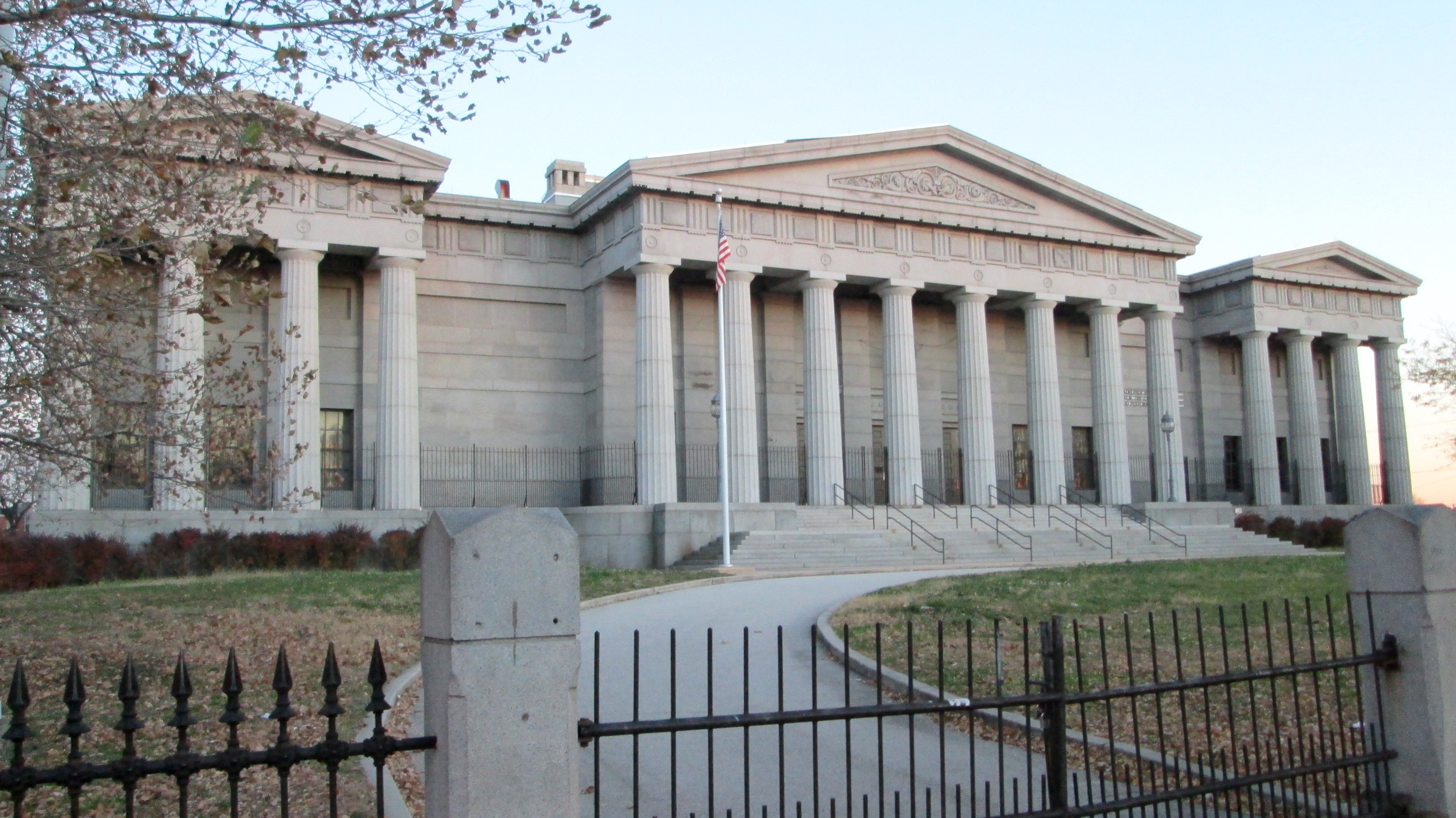
The Philadelphia High School for the Creative and Performing Arts, Bilal's alma mater

Bilal was born Bilal Sayeed Oliver in Germantown, Philadelphia, Pennsylvania. He grew up in a religiously mixed household, his mother being Christian and his father Muslim. When he was 11 he became choir director at his mother's church, and at 14 he formed a group and performed gigs at the Blue Moon Cafe in Philadelphia. As a formative experience, he cites his father taking him to the city's jazz clubs. "I used to have to sit in the back where the cigarette machine was. They had a curtain they could put over me just in case the police came", he recalls to Beat magazine:

I remember sitting back there watching all of these different bands who really intrigued me a lot. I liked the way the cats dressed, the way they talked. I got to see Terrence Blanchard, Kenny Kirkland, Jeff 'Tain' Watts. I was a 13-year-old – I made up my mind then that I wanted to be in music some kind of way.

Bilal graduated from the Philadelphia High School for the Creative and Performing Arts and then attended New York City's The New School for Jazz and Contemporary Music, where he met the pianist Robert Glasper on his first day. With Glasper, he frequented a number of jazz clubs in the city and eventually the Wetlands Preserve nightclub, where he connected with musicians of the Soulquarians collective: the Roots, Common, Erykah Badu, and Mos Def. Concurrently, Bilal frequented jam sessions set up by New School professors and students. At one such event, he met Aaron Comess, a musician from the pop-rock band Spin Doctors. The two went on to improvise together at Comess's home and produced a demo that was later heard by Interscope Records, who signed Bilal to a record contract.

== Career ==
=== 1999–2001: Beginnings with the Soulquarians and 1st album ===
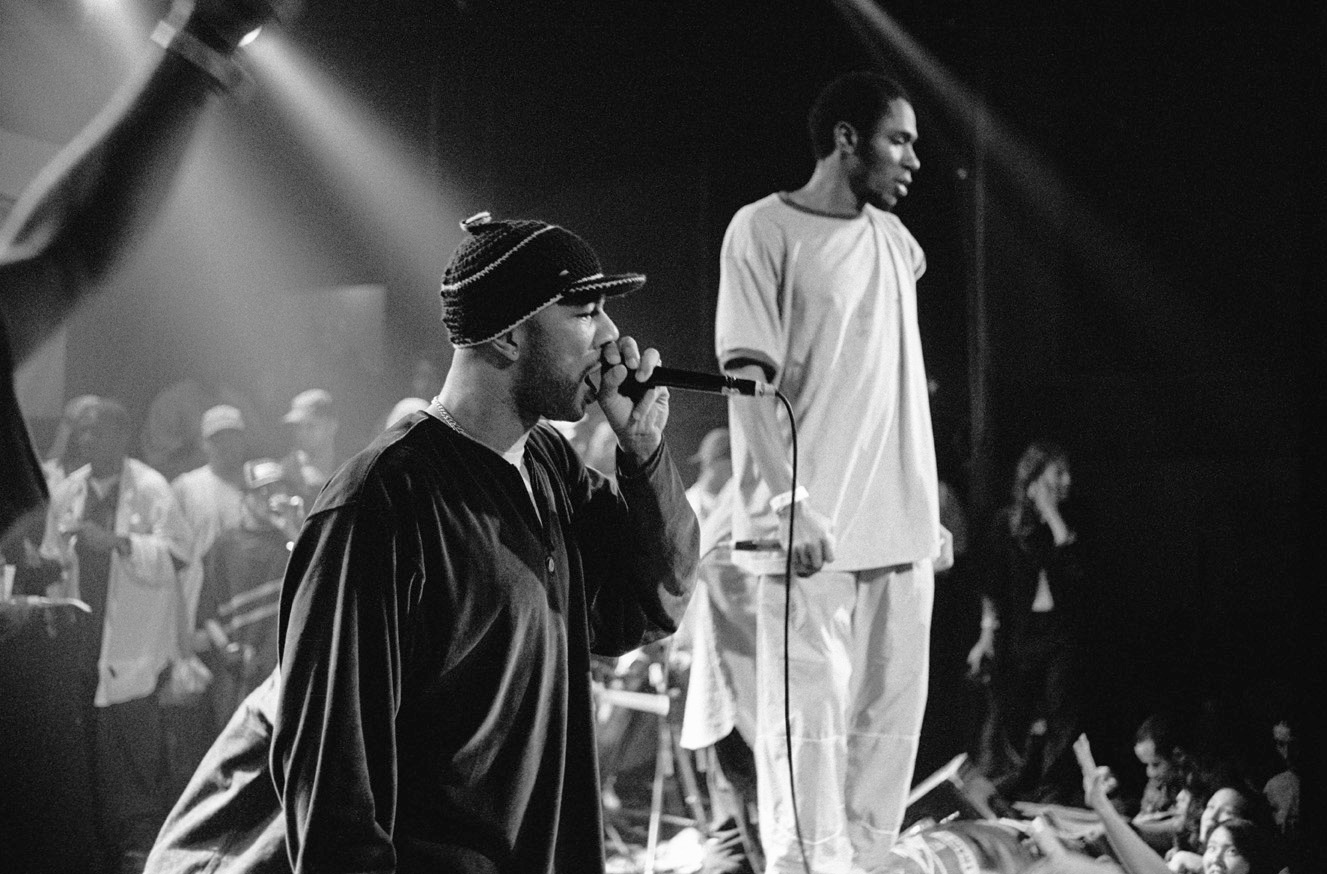
Common and Mos Def (pictured in 1999) appeared on Bilal's debut album and were his colleagues in the Soulquarians musical collective.

Bilal began to familiarize himself with the music scene in New York City, meeting prominent recording artists such as Common, The Roots, and Erykah Badu from the Soulquarians collective. Eventually, he was discovered by Aaron Comess from the Spin Doctors during an after-school jam session. It was with him that Bilal recorded his demo and eventually landed a record deal with Interscope Records.

In 2001, Bilal released his debut album 1st Born Second, which featured contributions from the Soulquarians as well as high-profile producers such as Dr. Dre and J Dilla. The album peaked at number 31 on the U.S. Billboard 200 chart, and it has sold 319,000 copies. 1st Born Second received universal acclaim from music critics; and holds a score of 82 out of 100 at Metacritic. The album earned rave reviews from publications including The Village Voice, Chicago Sun-Times, and USA Today, and it also received comparisons to the music of Marvin Gaye, Stevie Wonder, Sly & the Family Stone, Prince, and Curtis Mayfield.

The album showcased a wide variety, from the emotionally charged fan-favorite "Soul Sista", which peaked at No. 18 on the Top R&B/Hip-Hop Songs charts, to the political viewpoints of "Fast Lane" and "Second Child". Bilal managed to gain a sizable following and high attendance at his live shows, as well as much acclaim and respect from his peers, many of whom noted his range and ability to sing in a freeform style, and his classically trained falsetto. The soulful feel of the album caused Bilal to be labeled as "neo-soul". Bilal stresses that this term does not fit, and throughout his career, his expansion in music and pushing of boundaries proved his point.

=== 2001–2011: Love for Sale saga and Airtight's Revenge ===
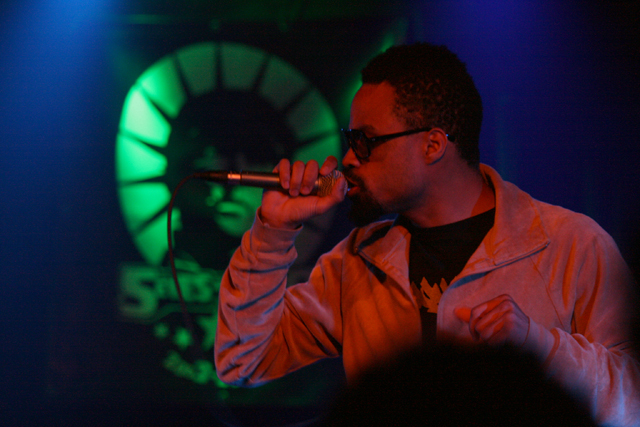
Bilal performing at the A38 concert hall in Budapest, 2008

In the following years Bilal continued to appear on projects by other artists of both high profile and avant garde, while recording and developing his follow-up set to be released on Interscope Records and featuring contributions primarily from producers Dr. Dre and J Dilla. These plans proved to be changeable and the final result, Love for Sale, was an album that appeared to be built around Bilal's own musicianship. Bilal switched it up on Love For Sale, which includes live instrumentation and a vibe completely new and different from its predecessor.

Bilal's anticipation for the album was shot down, however, after receiving disapproval from Interscope. Unwilling to start from scratch, Bilal continued to push his LP. However, near the album's completion, the album was leaked in its entirety on the Internet. Interscope shelved the album indefinitely, hinting that it saw little commercial potential in it. The event sent Bilal into a period of distress, and he was considering quitting music; however, Love for Sale received over half a million downloads on the Internet, and Bilal began touring, despite there not being a proper release of the album. His concerts were known for being intense and inspiring awe among audiences.

On a national level, he's still relatively unknown. Among peers, he remains an icon.

— Rachel Swan (East Bay Express, 2008)

In 2008, Bilal began recording for his next album. After nine years without a properly released album, Bilal made a comeback on September 14, 2010, with Airtight's Revenge, a sophomore LP released under independent record label Plug Research. Bilal describes it as a retrospective: an album that explores his experiences and things he has learned since his last release. An experimental album, Airtight's Revenge blends jazz, hip-hop, electronic, rock, soul, and blues into one raw, genuine collection of music. The album's single, "Little One", earned Bilal a nomination a 2011 Grammy Award nomination in the category of Best Urban/Alternative Performance. That year, he also contributed as a guest performer to the Roots' Grammy-nominated album Undun (2011) and the Robert Glasper Experiment's Grammy-winning Black Radio (2012).

=== 2012–2019: Further independent albums and guest projects ===
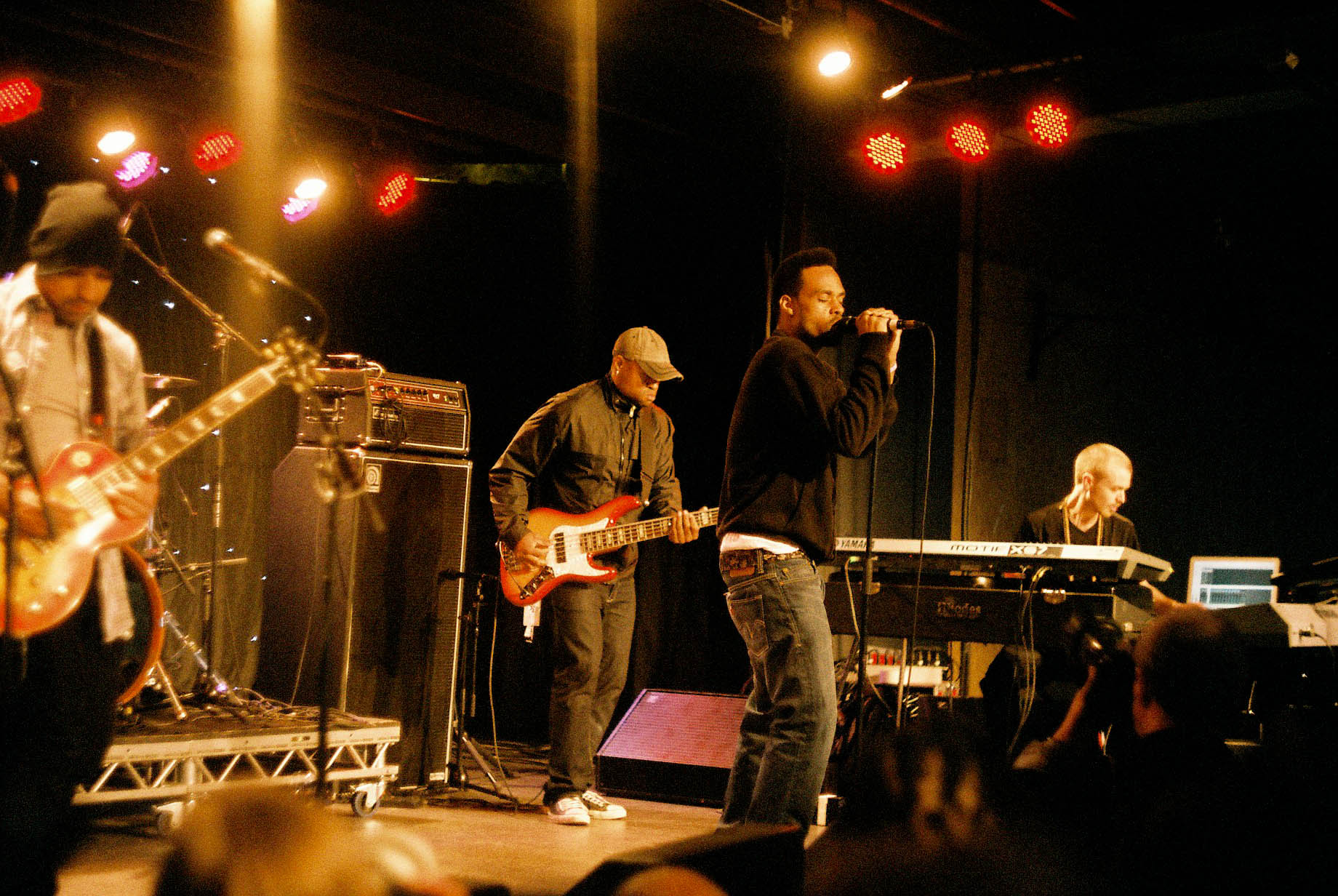
Bilal (center right) at the 2011 Stockholm Jazz Festival in Sweden

In 2012, Bilal revealed plans for a new album under a new label, eOne Music. During several interviews, he described the new project as "a lot warmer and [more] sensual" than its conceptual predecessor. The new album, titled A Love Surreal, has a more acoustic sound, as Bilal worked closely with his entire band. To set up the album's release, on December 5, 2012, he released a mixtape titled The Retrospection via Facebook and then the album's lead single "Back to Love" six days later. The song's music video was released on January 8, 2013, telling the story of a drug-addicted love doctor who ironically uses the advice he gives to his patients to help his own relationship. The song sets the tone for the album, which Bilal says embodies "the whole process [of love]: meeting, the break-up, [and] the get-back-together". A Love Surreal was released on February 26, 2013.

With the release of A Love Surreal, Bilal immediately achieved commercial success, debuting at No. 1 on iTunes' R&B Chart. On Billboard, the album debuted at No. 17 on the Independent Albums Chart, No. 19 on the R&B Albums Chart, and No. 103 on the Billboard 200, ranking higher than its predecessor, Airtight's Revenge. The album also received numerous high reviews, including an 8/10 from SPIN magazine, 4.5/5 stars from Allmusic, and 4/4 stars from USA Today.

In between albums, Bilal appeared on albums by a variety of recording artists, including Kimbra, Otis Brown III, Kat Dahlia, and Slum Village. His guest contributions to Kendrick Lamar's third album To Pimp a Butterfly (2015) helped create buzz for Bilal's fifth album, In Another Life, released in 2015 to critical success. In an essay on the Soulquarians published that year, Michael A. Gonzales traces the collective's impact to Bilal's contemporary contributions: "Listening to Kendrick Lamar's newest album To Pimp a Butterfly, Bilal has transformed himself into an arty Nate Dogg for the post-Soulquarian generation that includes Robert Glasper, Esperanza Spalding and, now, Kendrick. Also writing that year, Exclaim! journalist Kevin Jones said, "Bilal's years spent in career limbo feel like a relatively minor blip in the wake of the many artistically ambitious personal releases and guest projects the uncompromising singer has managed to string together in recent years."

I always used to tell cats, 'I'm a soul singer; I'm a blues singer.' But you don't really know pain. It's just pseudo pain when you're young. You've got to live life to know pain.

— Bilal (2016)

In 2019, Bilal contributed to Philip Bailey's single "We're a Winner", a recording of the Impressions' 1967 song of the same name. Bailey said of Bilal, who sang guest vocals and appeared in the music video: "Bilal was one of those singers who uses his [voice] like an instrument. And he's very explorative with his vocal [range]. He's played and he sang on things with more jazzy guys, too. I thought that our voices — obviously having those falsettos — would complement one another. And with that one, we actually sent him the files. I wasn't even in the studio with Bilal when he did his stuff."

=== 2020: Live-streamed EP amid pandemic ===
In August 2020, over the course of a three-day weekend, Bilal live streamed his creation of an experimental three-song EP for HighBreedMusic, a Brooklyn recording studio and digital music channel. He wrote, recorded, and produced one song each day, totaling 54 hours, in collaboration with producer Tariq Khan and 30 other musicians, including Erykah Badu, Robert Glasper, Tone Whitfield, Khemist, Simon Mavin (of Hiatus Kaiyote), Keyon Harrold, Madison McFerrin, Marcus Strickland, Yahzarah St. James, Raymond Angry, Ben Williams, Brandee Younger, Big Yuki, Melanie Charles, Marcus Gilmore, and Louis Cato. Each participant worked remotely due to the COVID-19 pandemic. The stream simultaneously showed the EP's artwork being made, with a group of three visual artists enlisted for each song, including Angelbert Metoyer and Shanina Dionna.

The EP was available to be pre-ordered during the weekend of the live stream, with sales and optional donations given to the participating artists, a number of whom were in financial difficulties because of the pandemic. On September 6, it was released on Bandcamp as a three-track digital download titled Voyage-19, for a price of $6.99, the profits of which were also distributed among the participants.

=== 2023-present: Live at Glasshaus and Adjust Brightness ===
In December 2023, Bilal performed a concert for at Glasshaus in Brooklyn, New York that was subsequently released as an album entitled Live at Glasshaus. The album was produced by Jarrett Wetherell for the Glasshaus label. Questlove, Common, Robert Glasper, and Burniss Travis joined Bilal as his ensemble. The group performed 11 songs from Bilal’s catalog, including 1st Born Second, Love For Sale, Airtight’s Revenge, Common’s Like Water For Chocolate, as well as the premiere of a new song, Who We R Now, which was performed as a medley with Common’s classic hit I Used To Love H.E.R. The concert was livestreamed twice, once in December of 2023, and a second time in June of 2024. The album was released on June 14, 2024 during Black Music Month.

In August 2024, Bilal announced his sixth studio album, Adjust Brightness. The eleven track album was self-released on September 30, 2024. The first single from the album was Sunshine, released on August 16th. A North American tour for the album began October 7th, 2024 and ended on October 26th.

On November 20, 2024, Bilal's concert documentary, Bilal: Live at Glasshaus, was released. The 65 minute film was directed by Jarrett Wetherell and premiered on YouTube via Glasshaus. It features intimate performance footage accompanied by interview commentary from Bilal, Questlove, Common, and Robert Glasper. The film was announced by The Hollywood Reporter and Essence described it as "raw and electrifying". The film won two Gold Telly Awards (in the categories of ‘Entertainment’ and ‘Live Events & Experiences’) and received a Webby Award nomination in ‘Video & Film: Events & Live Streams’.

In January 2025, Bilal performed on NPR's Tiny Desk.

In November 2025, Adjust Brightness was nominated at the 2026 Grammy Awards for ‘Best Progressive R&B Album’.

== Discography ==
Studio albums

- 1st Born Second (2001)
- Love for Sale (2001–2003; leaked 2006)
- Airtight's Revenge (2010)
- A Love Surreal (2013)
- In Another Life (2015)
- Adjust Brightness (2024)

Live albums

- Live at Glasshaus (2024)

EPs

- Voyage-19 (2020)

Mixtapes

- The Return of Mr. Wonderful (2007)
- The Retrospection (2012)

Singles

- "Soul Sista"; No. 71 US, No. 18 R&B
- "Love It"; No. 61 R&B
- "Fast Lane; No. 41 R&B
- "Something to Hold On To"
- "Restart"
- "Little One"
- "Levels"
- "Back to Love"
- "West Side Girl"

=== Appearances ===
Songs:

1999

- Grenique on "Let Go", "You Say" and "Love Within" from Black Butterfly

2000

- Guru and J Dilla, on "Certified" from Jazzmatazz, Vol. 3: Streetsoul

2001

- Jermaine Dupri on "Supafly" from Instructions
- "Bring 2" on The Wash (soundtrack)

2002

- Scratch, on "Square One" from The Embodiment of Instrumentation
- Talib Kweli on "Waitin' for the DJ" & "Talkin' to You" from Quality
- Da Ranjahz & Ras Kass on "Da Dopest"
- Jaguar Wright on "I Can't Wait" from Denials Delusions and Decisions
- Tweet on "Best Friend" from Southern Hummingbird
- Cherokee, on "A Woman Knows" from Soul Parade
- John Ellis, on "John Brown's Gun", "Nowny Dreams" and "The Lonely Jesus" from Roots, Branches & Leaves

2003

- Beyoncé on "Everything I Do", from the soundtrack of The Fighting Temptations
- Musiq on "Dontstop/Her" from Soulstar

2004

- Boney James's "Better With Time", from Pure
- Robert Glasper on "Maiden Voyage" and "Don't Close Your Eyes" from Mood
- Max Herre on "Playground" from Max Herre

2005

- Robert Glasper on "Chant" from Canvas
- Luvpark on "Fade Away" and "Luvtheme" from Luvpark

2006

- Pete Kuzma on "High and Dry" from Exit Music: Radiohead Tribute
- Clipse and Pharrell Williams, on "Nightmares" from Hell Hath No Fury
- A-Alikes on "What You Give" from I Eat You Eat

2007

- Hezekiah on "Looking Up" from I Predict a Riot
- Timbo King & The Last Poets on "Trust Factor" from Spookz Who Kicked Down The Door
- Sa-Ra on "Sweet Sour You" from The Hollywood Recordings
- Jay-Z on "Fallin'" from American Gangster
- The Randy Watson Experience on "Can't Hide Love" from Interpretations: Celebrating the Music of Earth, Wind & Fire
- Common on "Play Your Cards Right" from Smokin' Aces soundtrack.

2008

- Ghostface Killah & Prodigy of Mobb Deep on "Trials of Life" off an unknown DJ Green Lantern mixtape.
- Erykah Badu on "The Healer", "My People", "Soldier", "Twinkle" & "Master Teacher" from New Amerykah Part One (4th World War)
- The Game (rapper) on "Cali Sunshine" from LAX
- Solange on "Cosmic Journey" from Sol-Angel and the Hadley St. Dreams
- M.O.P. on "Get Rich"
- 88-Keys on "M.I.L.F." from The Death of Adam
- Scarface on "Can't Get It Right" from Emeritus
- J Dilla on "Remember"

2009

- Zap Mama on "The Way You Are", from ReCreation
- Shafiq Husayn on "Cheeba" from En' A-Free-Ka (Plug Research)
- Robert Glasper's "All Matter" and "Open Mind" from Double-Booked
- The Terence Blanchard Group's "Journey" and "When Will You Call" from Choices
- Marvwon on "Need To Know" from Way Of The Won

2010

- Erykah Badu on "Jump in the Air & Stay There" from New Amerykah Part Two (Return of the Ankh)
- Little Brother and Darien Brockington on "Second Chances" from The Leftback
- Reflection Eternal on "End" from Revolutions per Minute
- Nottz on "Right Here" from You Need This Music
- Diddy – Dirty Money on "Shades feat. Lil Wayne, Justin Timberlake, James Fauntleroy" from Last Train to Paris

2011

- Daedelus on "Overwhelmed" from Bespoke
- Kindred the Family Soul on "Take a Look Around" from Love Has No Recession
- Stimulus & Chris 'Daddy' Dave on "Full Grown" from 3rd 1st Impression
- Georgia Anne Muldrow on "More & More" from Owed to Mama Rickie
- The Roots on "The OtherSide" from Undun

2012

- Robert Glasper on "Always Shine Ft. Lupe Fiasco" & "Letter to Hermione" from Black Radio
- Lupe Fiasco on "How Dare You" from Lupe Fiasco's Food & Liquor II: The Great American Rap Album Pt. 1
- Chrisette Michele on "Can the Cool Be Loved?" from Better

2014

- Kimbra on "Everlovin' Ya" from The Golden Echo

2015

- Kendrick Lamar on "Institutionalized" and "These Walls" from To Pimp A Butterfly

2016

- Kendrick Lamar on "untitled 01 | 8.19.2014." from untitled unmastered.
- J Dilla on "The Ex" from The Diary
- Mac Miller on "Congratulations" from The Divine Feminine

2017

- The Roots on "It Ain't Fair" from "Detroit (film)" Original Motion Picture Soundtrack/Audio
- Talib Kweli, Datcha, Robert Glasper on "Write At Home" from Radio Silence

2018

- The Putbacks on "The Ways" from The Putbacks (HopeStreet Recordings)

2020

- Salaam Remi on "Comin' Outta The Rain"

2025

- De La Soul on "Palm of His Hands" from Cabin in the Sky

with Common

- "Funky For You" (Common & Jill Scott) from Like Water for Chocolate
- "Nag Champa (Afrodesiac for the World)" from Like Water for Chocolate
- "The 6th Sense" from Like Water for Chocolate
- "Heaven Somewhere" from Electric Circus
- "Aquarius" from Electric Circus
- "Star69 (PS With Love)" from Electric Circus
- "Faithful" (Common & John Legend) from Be
- "It's Your World/Pop's Reprise" from Be
- "U, Black Maybe" from Finding Forever
- "Misunderstood" from Finding Forever
- "Play Your Cards Right" from Finding Forever
- "Joy and Peace" from Black America Again
- "Home" from "Black America Again"
- "A Bigger Picture Called Free" from "Black America Again"
- "Letter To The Free" from "Black America Again"

== Awards and nominations ==
Year	Awards	Category	Work	Outcome
2010	Grammy Awards	Best Urban/Alternative Performance	"All Matter"	Nominated
2011	Grammy Awards	Best Urban/Alternative Performance	"Little One"	Nominated
2016	Grammy Awards	Album of the Year	To Pimp a Butterfly	Nominated
2016	Grammy Awards	Best Rap/Sung Performance	"These Walls"	Won
2026	Grammy Awards	Best Progressive R&B Album	Adjust Brightness	Nominated

== Tours ==
Little One Tour (2011)
