= Love for Sale (Bilal album) =

2006 studio album by Bilal

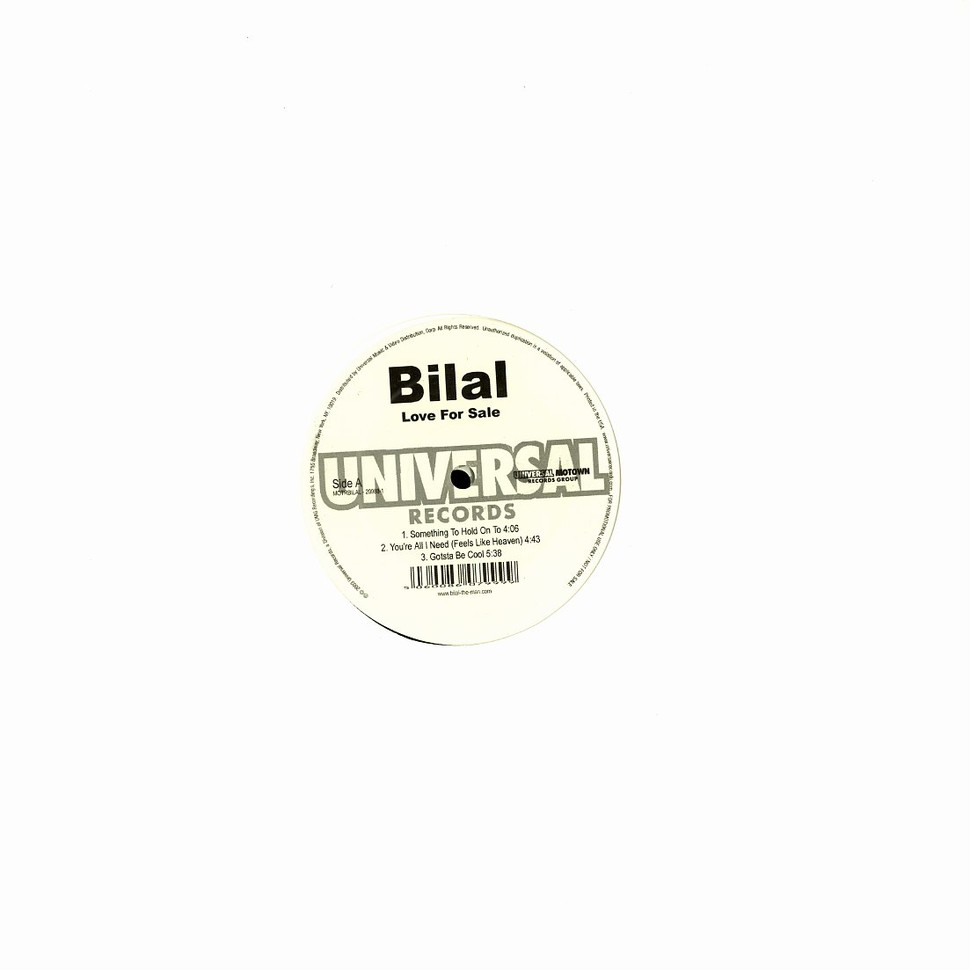
- Front sleeve of an early promotional pressing, with the vinyl label shown in the center hole

Studio album by Bilal
- Released: Unreleased (Note: Leaked onto the Internet in early 2006)
- Recorded: 2001–2003
- Studio: Electric Lady (New York)
- Genre: Soul; funk; rock; jazz fusion; blues rock; avant-garde; progressive soul
- Length: 58:59
- Label: Interscope; Universal
- Producer: Bilal; Dr. Dre; J Dilla; Steve McKie; Nottz; Sa-Ra Creative Partners

Bilal chronology
1st Born Second (2001)	Love for Sale (unreleased)	Airtight's Revenge (2010)

Love for Sale is an unreleased studio album by the American singer-songwriter Bilal, originally meant to be his second album. It was recorded from 2001 to 2003 at Electric Lady Studios in New York during the height of the Soulquarians era, a period in the studio's history marked by the frequent and innovative recording activity of that musical collective, in which Bilal was a member. Written and produced mainly by Bilal, the album was a departure from the producer-driven, hip hop-influenced neo-soul music of 1st Born Second (2001), his moderately successful debut album for Interscope Records.

Bilal pursued a more raw and independent direction with Love for Sale, which he mostly composed on piano. At Electric Lady, he held improvisatory jam sessions with a live band featuring the trumpeter Leron Thomas, the drummer Steve McKie, and the pianist Robert Glasper, one of several former classmates the singer enlisted from New York's New School for Jazz and Contemporary Music. With the assistance of a few select producers, such as Dr. Dre and Soulquarians member J Dilla, Bilal experimented with different recording techniques, longer free-form compositions, and arrangements drawn from jazz and the blues. The resulting music features a densely layered fusion of genres, including soul, funk, and rock, with unconventional song structures and rhythms. Bilal's varied falsetto vocal performances throughout the album include sensual and ecstatic expressions of romantic devotion and lovesickness, with lyrics reflecting a distaste for writing what he called "contrived love songs".

The album's dark and experimental nature was met with resistance from Interscope, who demanded Bilal record new music and delayed the release. The singer refused and continued to lobby Love for Sale while mixing the recordings in the studio. As he neared its completion and a prospective release date, an unfinished mix of the album leaked and circulated widely on the Internet in 2006, becoming one of the most notorious such cases during the rise of digital piracy. Interscope responded by shelving Love for Sale's commercial release indefinitely, which aroused suspicion and controversy among Internet communities and exacerbated the label's conflict with Bilal, ending in his dismissal.

The leaked album quickly enjoyed an underground popularity and online acclaim, inspiring the distressed singer to tour performing its songs and continue his career in more artistically daring directions. Its growing mystique as an innovative but neglected musical work helped enhance Bilal's profile, as he was sought after for recordings by other artists, while several of the album's contributors went on to work on his future projects. A cult classic among black music fans, Love for Sale has since been considered by some critics to be Bilal's masterpiece and a forerunner of similarly progressive R&B music that developed by the end of the 2000s decade. Interscope retained control of its master recordings, and another company has held the publishing rights, although the songs remain available online.

== Background ==
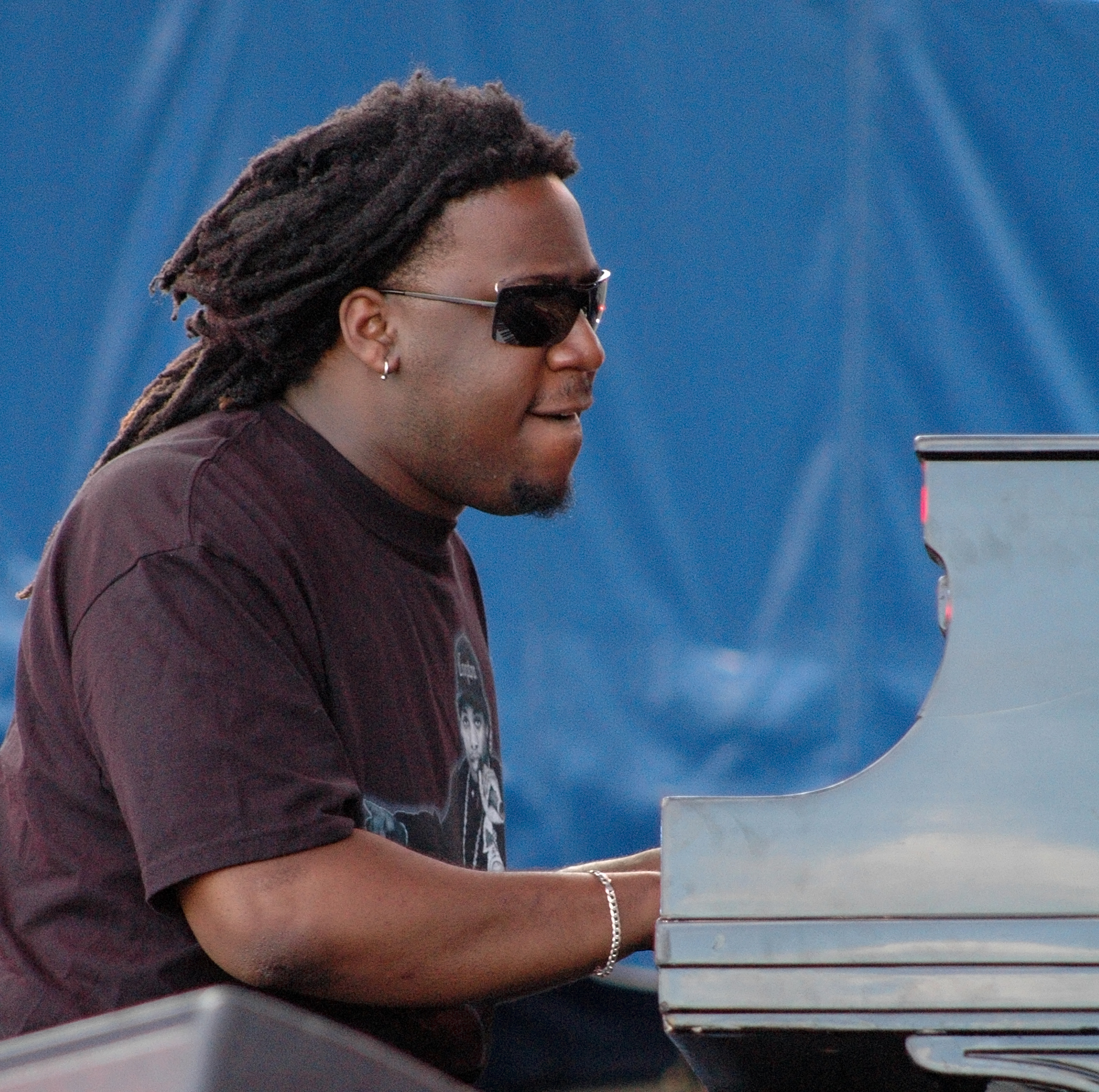
Robert Glasper (in 2006), Bilal's music school classmate and professional collaborator

Bilal started his music career in 1999 while attending the New School for Jazz and Contemporary Music in New York City, where he studied jazz singing and practiced writing original songs. With his classmate and friend Robert Glasper, he frequented local music clubs such as the Wetlands Preserve, where he met members of the Soulquarians, a rotating collective of experimental black music artists who often collaborated on each other's recordings. A demo recorded with the musician Aaron Comess, who Bilal met at a jam session set up by New School professors, earned the singer a recording contract from Interscope Records and encouraged his exit from the school to concentrate on music professionally, including the projects of the Soulquarians.

Bilal's tenure at Interscope was marked by conflict, beginning when the record label disapproved of the alternative rock-style demos he recorded for his prospective debut album. With contributions from the Soulquarians amid pressure from Interscope for more high-profile producers, 1st Born Second was released in 2001 to modest sales but critical acclaim. It was recognized as a pivotal release in neo soul and earned Bilal comparisons to D'Angelo, his contemporary in the genre.

However, Bilal felt uncomfortable with the media's neo-soul categorizations, finding the term restrictive of black musicians. He did not want to be labeled as "the soul guy", according to Glasper, who went on to play piano in his band. As the singer explains, "I was trying to come from a jazz perspective. I was trying to write open-ended kind of tunes that could go in a lot of different directions live." (Note: Bilal tells the ethnomusicologist Fredara Mareva Hadley that his compositions are structured in a way that allows for them to be continuously interpreted and reworked in a variety of musical styles, such as in live performance.) Bilal's concerts featured a backing band and dynamic that departed from contemporary R&B conventions and helped expand his fanbase, although Interscope wanted higher album sales from the singer.

== Writing and recording ==
While performing on tour in support of 1st Born Second, Bilal and his band developed his music further in the directions of funk, rock, and jazz fusion. This experimentation informed his songwriting for Love for Sale. Mainly a keyboard-oriented composer, Bilal composed most of the songs himself on piano, a process he cites as the beginning of his singer-songwriter experience. He experimented with writing music to different cadences and forms beyond the traditional verse-chorus structure of popular music, in an attempt to deconstruct his composing methods and sensibilities, which he felt were becoming contrived. He tells Vibe magazine that he was feeling "rebellious" and eager at the time to write, produce, and play music on his own.

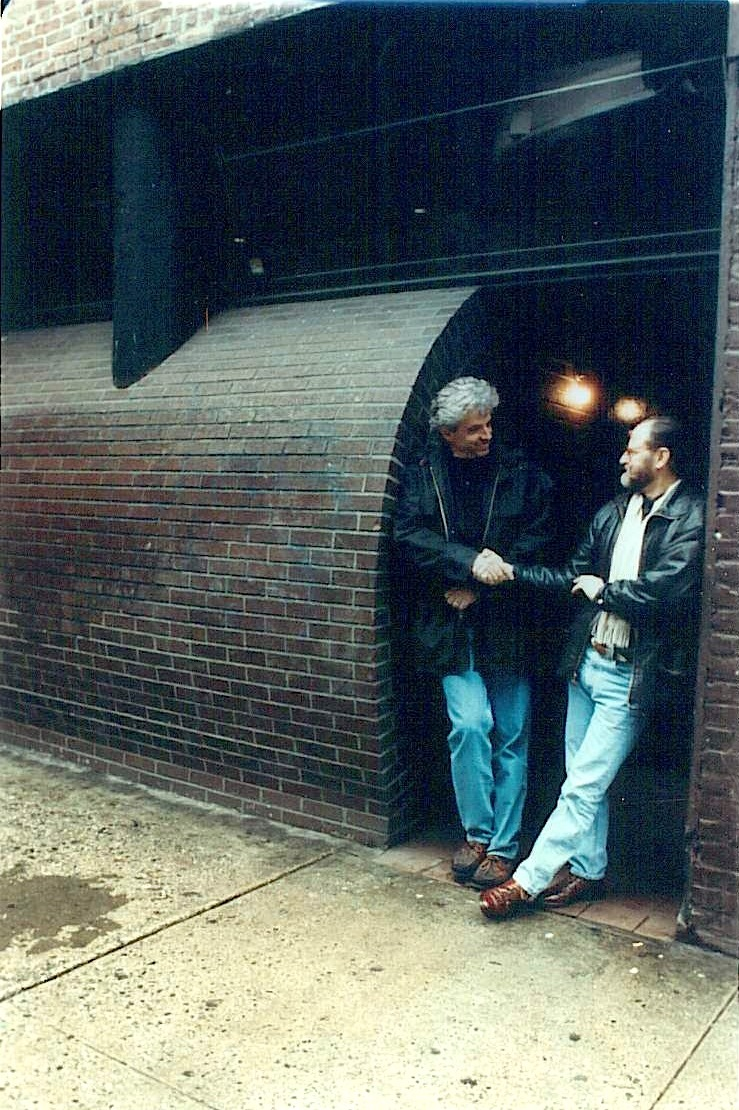
The album was recorded at New York's Electric Lady Studios. (Its designers, John Storyk and Eddie Kramer, outside the studio in 2009)

Bilal's desire for a more independent project was met with some resistance by Interscope. The label allowed him recording time at Electric Lady Studios, where he had previously recorded 1st Born Second. Built in New York City's Greenwich Village in 1970 under the commission of the rock musician Jimi Hendrix, the studio had at this point become a home base for the Soulquarians and their innovative recording sessions, which often drew on the creative freedom of Hendrix's music. (Note: The period in Electric Lady's history from the late 1990s to the early 2000s is known as the Soulquarians era due to the collective's extensive use of the studio.) According to the music journalist Michael Gonzales, this was at "the height of the Soulquarians' heydey", as members such as D'Angelo, the singer-songwriter Erykah Badu, and the rapper Common were all working on music there when Bilal started his sessions. (Note: Common and the vocal group Zap Mama would contribute to Bilal's recording of "Sorrow, Tears & Blood" for the album.)

Bilal pursued what he described as "a raw, bluesy feeling" for Love for Sale, inspired by the blues singer Howlin' Wolf's recordings, and used more live instrumentation than on 1st Born Second. He worked with several musicians for the first time, such as the hip hop producers Nottz and Denaun Porter, and enlisted former classmates from the New School, including Glasper and the trumpeter Leron Thomas, who had performed in Bilal's touring ensemble. (Note: Thomas had been a classmate of Glasper's at Kinder High School for the Performing and Visual Arts in their native city of Houston, before moving to New York in the late 1990s and attending the New School. His connection to Glasper and Bilal there led to his trumpet playing on projects of the Soulquarians.)

The Philadelphia-based drummer Steve McKie was also recruited for the recording. An unadventurous musician up to that point, McKie felt encouraged to leave his comfort zone and experiment more while working with Bilal, who gave the band freedom to improvise in jam sessions. In his account of the sessions in 2001 and 2002, McKie recalls walking into Electric Lady and seeing only a Rhodes piano and a bass amp in the room with "really great acoustics" intended for drumming: "I felt like I was in [high school] tapping on tables and we just made kick from candle and notepad, put a drum mic on the floor and made a wild acoustic kick."

=== Production ===
The majority of the production was done by Bilal. He experimented with recording techniques in the studio, as well as arrangements from jazz and the blues, influenced by Wolf and the bassist-composer Charles Mingus in particular. According to Rachel Swan of the East Bay Express, "he took a very considered approach in making the beats, creating layered melodies and chord voicings that sound as though he had a full band in the studio with him." Bilal also experimented with different methods to manipulating the sound of the recordings, including tape reel distortion and processing them through the Akai MPC 2000 (a music workstation). In another attempt to challenge his songmaking habits, he tried using different carrier signals in the process of modulating the recordings.

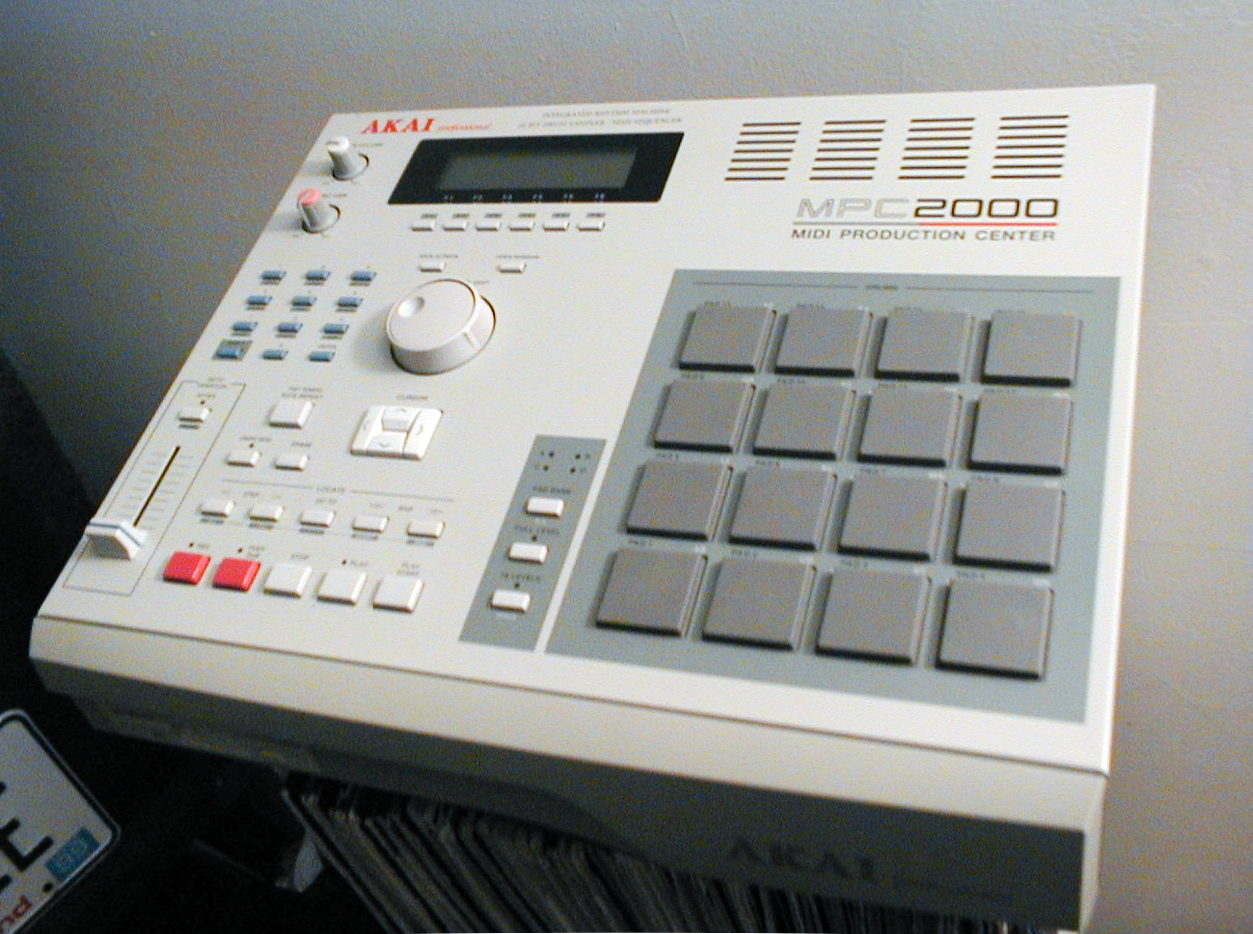
An Akai MPC 2000, used by Bilal in the album's production

Some songs were composed and recorded with a few producers Bilal chose personally, deviating from Interscope's preference for an entirely high-profile production. "Sweet, Sour U" was produced by Sa-Ra Creative Partners, a trio of producer-musicians working with electro, hip hop, and soul sounds. Nottz and fellow producers J Dilla and Dr. Dre, who had both worked on 1st Born Second, were among those who assisted Love for Sale's production in limited roles. Dilla, a multi-instrumentalist member of the Soulquarians, showed Bilal an approach to arranging songs by way of drum programming. As the singer explains:

He had this thing where no matter what he picked up he could bend his will into it. Just because you hear it so strong in your head you can throw the funk in it.

Bilal worked on "Gotsta Be Cool" and "Lord Don't Let It" with McKie, who had begun exploring production at the time. McKie recorded the musicians using a Roland VS-880 digital audio workstation, making adjustments to the drum sounds, and sampled the recordings through the Akai MPC. "My screen went out on me a few times", McKie recalls of the sampler. "It was pretty amazing how we did the stuff ... That was the most bizarre way to do it but when you only have two pieces to work with you figure out how to make things work." Bilal recounts that using such computerized equipment in the studio made him feel "like a wizard". Speaking on the entire process of making Love for Sale, the singer says he "grew a lot" and "felt the most comfortable as an artist there".

== Music ==
Stylistically rooted in soul, Love for Sale nonetheless features a densely layered fusion of genres, identified by SoulTracks writer L. Michael Gipson as "innovative, sometimes deconstructed soul", funk, and electric rock. Andres Reyes of Shook explains that "this wasn't your typical neo-soul or R&B album", finding Bilal and his band's performance emulative of Howlin' Wolf, the jazz fusion group Return to Forever, and the experimental rock musician Frank Zappa. Gipson adds that it departs from the contemporary hip hop sounds of 1st Born Second in favor of strong experimentation with "progressive jazz", and Smash Gordon, of the Fabric club's blog, recognizes jazz inflections in Bilal's wide-ranging and "colorful" productions. Consequence of Sound writer Chris Coplan also describes the sound as undergoing a "transformation" but closer to blues rock, while A.D. Amorosi of The Philadelphia Inquirer considers it "weirdly rock- and folk-tinged". Meanwhile, Time Out magazine's Brad Farberman interprets the end result as "haunting, otherworldly funk junkets" alongside "spare, earthy R&B rituals". These include "Something to Hold on To" and what Amorosi describes as its album-opening "tinkling pianos" and "breezy" R&B in the vein of blaxploitation film soundtracks.

"Something to Hold on To"
A sample of the first chorus and verse, featuring Bilal's falsetto vocal and lyrics of romantic devotion over a piano-tinkling boogie beat

The songs feature free-form composition and unorthodox rhythms, deviating from the conventional three-minute song structures of popular music, with Sarah Godfrey of The Washington Post saying that the "genre-bending" and "trippy" tracks are generally lengthier than the average radio single. According to Tom Hull, the "slack and disjointed rhythm" prevalent in contemporary neo-soul is exemplified on Love for Sale in radical form and without the genre's typically glossy production, particularly on songs like "Hollywood". "Something to Hold on To" and "Hollywood" are both "boogied-out anthems", in the words of Indy Week journalist Eric Tullis. In Nottz's production for the former track, DJ Rahdu also detects a sample of the gospel singer Myrna Summers' 1979 recording "Give Me Something to Hold on To (Pt. II)", noting the sample source's opening piano chords, alto vocal, and choir elements. "Sorrow, Tears & Blood", a remake of the Nigerian Afrobeat musician Fela Kuti's 1977 song of the same name, also samples a portion of Kuti's vocals from the 1981 song "Coffin for Head of State". (Note: Bilal cites Kuti's mix of jazz and folk tastes as another influence on his music.)

=== Vocals ===
Most of Love for Sale's compositions are developed around Bilal's classically trained jazz singing. While he sings in a falsetto register throughout the album, Daniel Cunningham of the Detroit Metro Times notes that he "can often suddenly change the timbre and pitch of his voice", in the manner of a woodwind instrument, and also take on "upbeat hip-hop undertones". (Note: In an interview with Cunningham, Bilal compares his vocal range to a tenor saxophone and credits the influence of jazz musicians such as John Coltrane and Miles Davis for his falsetto and scat techniques.) In Swan's opinion, his vocals demonstrate a "musical depth" uncommon in modern pop music, while Tullis suggests he performs in a combustible manner comparable to a diesel engine or fireworks.

On "Something to Hold on To", Bilal's singing voice "[ranges] from throatier sensuality to his signature ecstatic falsetto", as LA Weekly's Rebecca Haithcoat writes. For "Make Me Over", he uses various vocal influences in the manner of other "chameleonic" musicians such as Sarah Vaughan, George Clinton, David Bowie, and Prince, according to Emily J. Lordi, a writer and academic of black music: "Bilal makes himself over in the sonic image of about five different singers (to my ear), from John Legend to Sly Stone". Craig D. Lindsey from The Village Voice describes the track as "perhaps the best Prince song Prince never recorded". Bilal sings in a more wail-like manner on ballads such as the sweepingly arranged "All for Love", on which he is accompanied by punchy horn sounds.

=== Lyrics ===
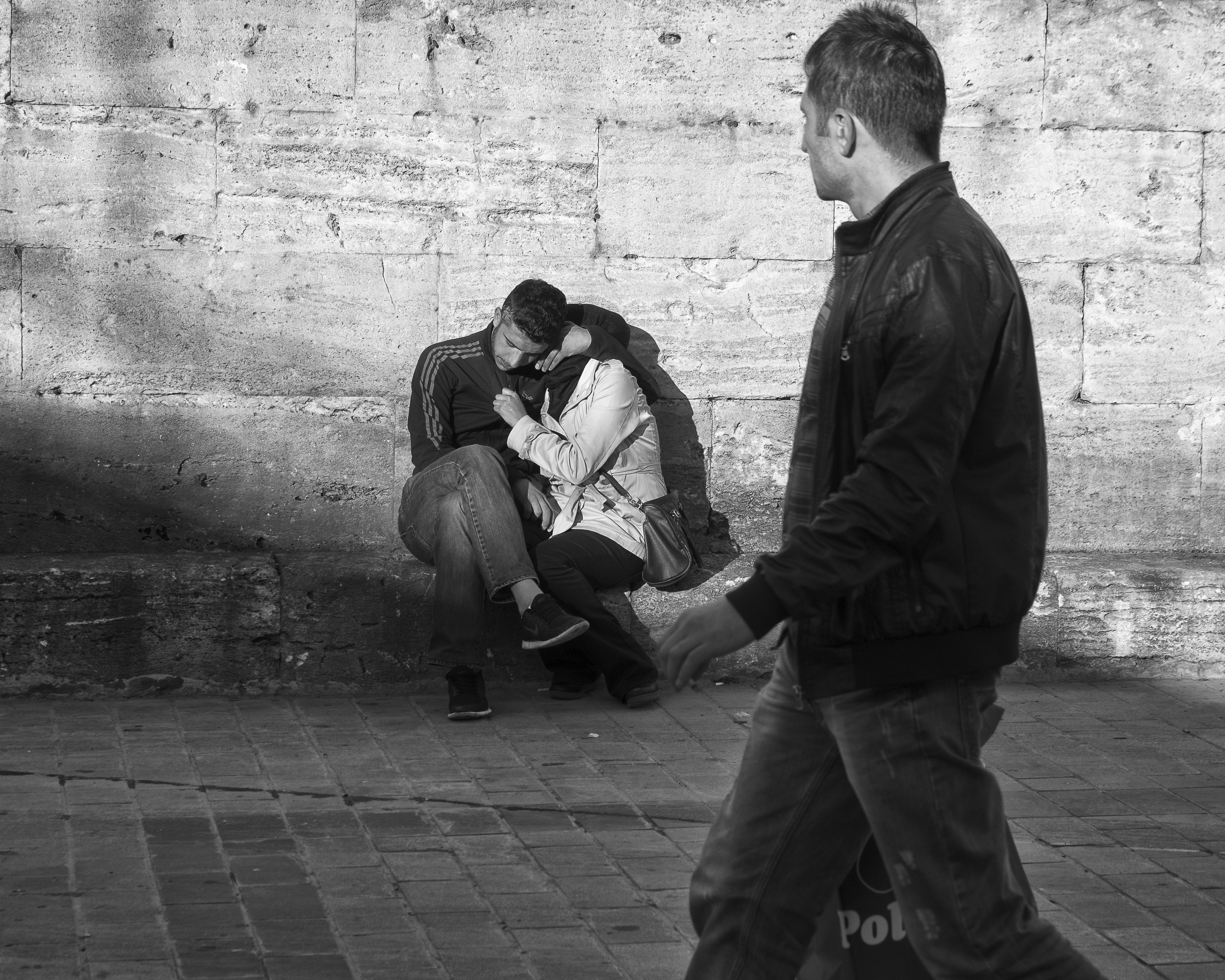
A man passing by and looking on a couple in the streets of Istanbul. The album explores different feelings and variations of romantic love.

Lyrically, the album's opening track "Something to Hold on To" reflects Bilal's growing dissatisfaction with writing "contrived love songs" at the time, as he tells the lyrics website Genius. According to Haithcoat, the song serves as "the equivalent of foreplay" as the singer declares his devotion to a lover in lyrics resembling "a letter (or text) dashed off after waking at 4:00 a.m. in a lovesick sweat". The line, "And I know that shit sounds corny, but it's the way that I feel", also reflects his self-commentary as he was writing the song. While Godfrey finds that song's lyrics "grounded", more brazen sentiments feature in the sexual slow jam "White Turns to Grey" ("Did I hear you say, 'come harder, baby'") and "Make Me Over", "a manic funk love song" in which Bilal sings of submitting himself wholly for love's sake.

Less successful romances are detailed in "Get Out of My Hair", which addresses an unsuitable partner, and "Lord Don't Let It", in which a "playa" is heartbroken over having found and then lost the woman he feels destined to love. "All for Love" describes the risks of dwelling on past love. One of its lyrics ("No time for regrets, who lives to rehearse?") was inspired by advice Bilal received from Erykah Badu who told him, as he recounts, "never to apologize for any thought you have" as an artist.

== Delays ==
After the recording's completion in 2003, Bilal presented the album to Interscope executives, who responded negatively to its avant-garde direction. "They really felt the record was kind of dark and not really sexy", he tells The Root. The production company contracting him at the time offered similar doubts. "They kept saying 'It's so fucked up and weird' ... 'This shit is so dark'", the singer explains, noting that only his band had approved of the music at this point. According to the radio journalist Jesse Thorn, Bilal's change of direction from his popular R&B single "Soul Sista" (2000) toward a progressive soul variant frustrated Interscope, who still wanted to market him strictly as a soul singer.

Interscope wanted Bilal to record new songs, particularly a suitable single. Unwilling to start anew, he continued to lobby Love for Sale, leading to several delays and disputes with the record label. Bilal also worked on new parts to some of the recordings, including "Gotsta Be Cool". He composed a string section with Leron Thomas in the style of jazz and opera, while having a friend from the New School's classical department record operatic vocals for the song, the result of which Bilal compared to the singer Jean Carn's collaborations with her pianist husband Doug. "But the label was just like, 'what the hell are you doing?'", he recalls. "I went to battle on that album on a daily basis, which I felt was kind of stupid because I felt the music was really dope, and most people I was playing it for were feeling it and loving it."

Russell Elevado, the audio engineer who mixed a few of the album's songs around 2004, recalls Interscope insisting Bilal return to the studio and record more material. According to Status magazine, a cover of the 1995 Radiohead song "High and Dry" was recorded for the album. (Note: A soul-styled cover of "High and Dry" by Bilal and the keyboardist-producer Pete Kuzma later appeared on the Radiohead tribute album Exit Music: Songs with Radio Heads, released in 2006.) Bilal calls this compounding conflict with the label his "lowest point" as an artist.

=== Previews ===
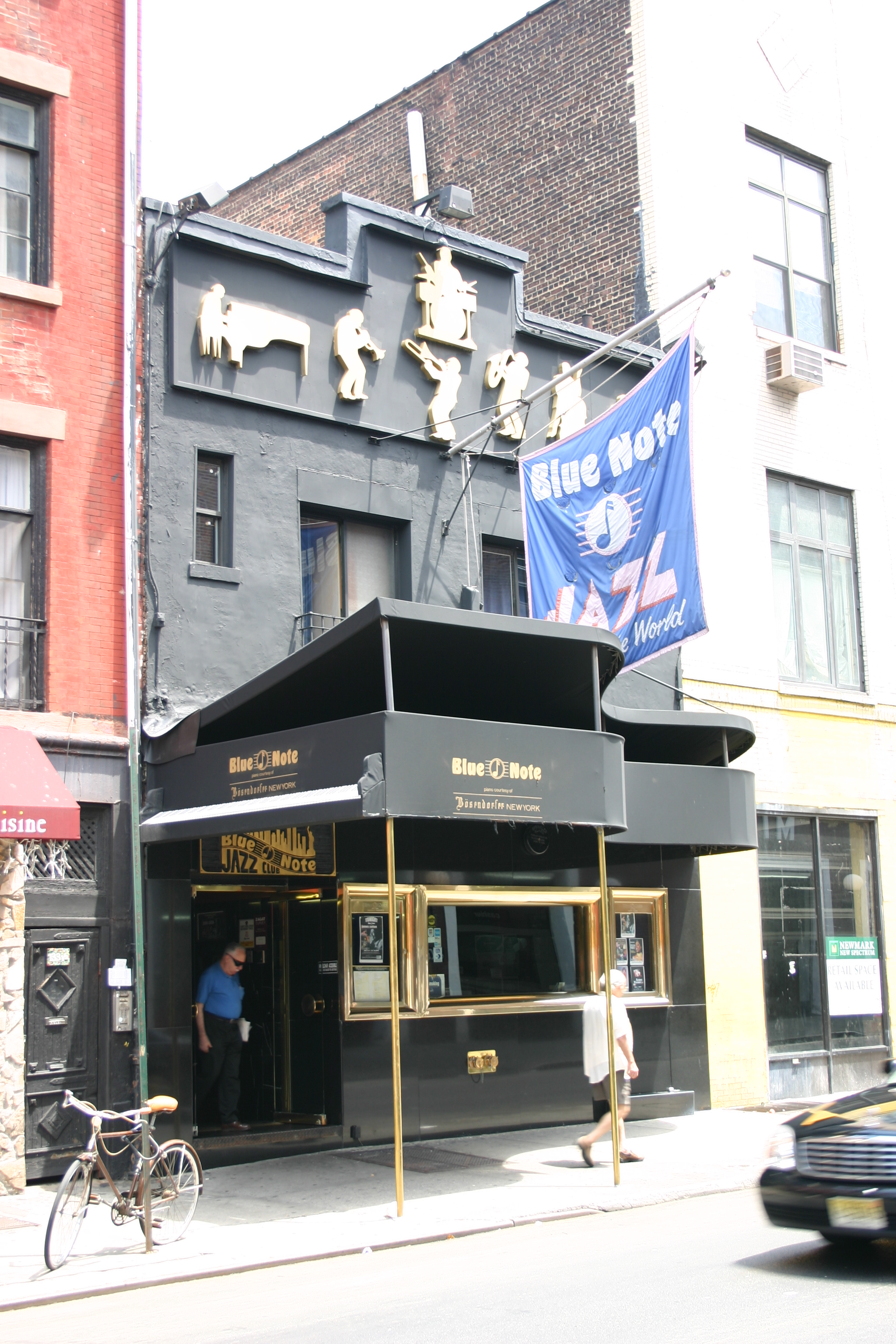
New York's Blue Note Jazz Club (2004), among the venues where Bilal previewed music from Love for Sale

In mid-2005, Bilal premiered a few of the album's songs at an event in Philadelphia hosted by the Beat Society producers showcase. Demonstrating a stylistic departure from 1st Born Second, the premiere started a growing buzz about Love for Sale. In Cunningham's recollection, "the urban music community was ready to embrace it". Around this time, Bilal played the Celebrate Brooklyn! festival's summer concert series, performing "All for Love" from the album. According to Dana Bingham, a music blogger who attended the show and later interviewed Bilal, Love for Sale was expected in September 2005, but the release did not materialize.

In January 2006, Bilal performed "All for Love" again, this time as a guest vocalist for Glasper's Jabane Ensemble at the Blue Note Jazz Club in New York. According to Elevado, the Blue Note was a five-night series featuring Common, Erykah Badu, and Musiq Soulchild among its nightly guests, with Bilal utilizing a jazz improvisation concept and processing his singing voice through different effects pedals. By this time, the singer was still mixing the album in the studio, nearing its completion. A promotional copy had also been manufactured on vinyl.

== Leak ==
Title was Love for Sale and the shit never went on sale [Laughs]. Love for Free [Laughs]

— Bilal

In early 2006, a preliminary mix of Love for Sale inexplicably appeared on the Internet, originally on a torrent site. According to Swan, the leak occurred "a couple months before the projected release date", and Reyes notes that the album was "only 80% complete" at this point. Copies of the mix were shared on blogs and peer-to-peer networks, with Gipson reporting that there was also a "vinyl leak". Widely bootlegged, Love for Sale was eventually downloaded more than 500,000 times as "fans ate it up and passed the album around like [a] viral Internet meme", recounts Larrier.

The leaked album was met with acclaim online and developed a cult following, becoming more popular with Bilal's fans than 1st Born Second while expanding his audience. In Gordon's words, the "hugely-anticipated-and-highly-pirated Love for Sale lit up the internet to [an] unparalleled degree" with a "hype machine righteously making immense waves around it". Mathan Erhardt, a comics journalist for Inside Pulse at the time, reviewed the album in the webzine's music column and confirmed its praises. While prefacing that he is a "fickle" listener who dislikes R&B, Erhardt found it to be far superior to contemporaneous music releases and a "genuine masterpiece" that inspires optimism for both the genre and Bilal.

Reflecting on the album's immediate appeal, the music journalist Aliya Ewing explains that it "seemed to be a more authentic and unbridled reflection of who he was as an artist at that point in time", while Gipson says it revealed "Bilal's freaky side and phenomenal range in a way that 1st Born Second only hinted at". According to Tullis, "he had become an unclassifiable soul hero".

=== Shelving ===
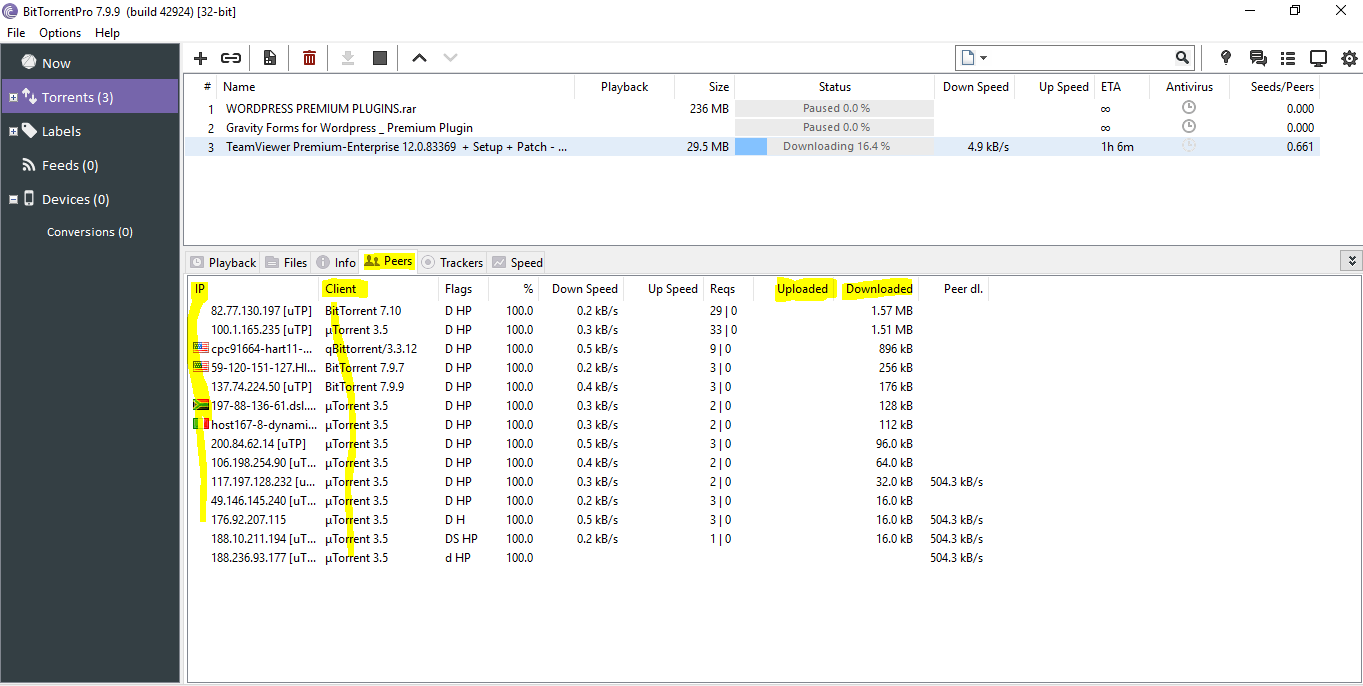
Torrenting on a peer-to-peer network, similar to how the leaked album was shared

Shortly after the leak, Bilal posted a statement on his MySpace profile, expressing concern that the leak could lead to Love for Sale being shelved by his record label. Interscope wanted to abandon the project altogether and have Bilal start from scratch, to which he refused and stopped attending scheduled studio sessions. "I was really happy with the work that I had done, and we just started to go back and forth", he explains. In September 2006, Adrian Covert reported for Prefixmag that neither Bilal nor Universal Records (Interscope's parent company) had made a statement about Love for Sale in the seven months since its leak while noting the singer's absence from the artist roster at Universal's website. This led Covert to deduce that Love for Sale had been shelved.

Interscope's decision to shelve the album became the subject of much controversy among online communities, with many debating the label's reasons. Rumors circulated that Interscope used the leak as an excuse to abandon a project they deemed too experimental to market, or that it was leaked by the label for this very reason. According to WBUR journalist Arielle Gray, Love for Sale was "shrouded in controversy and eschewed by his label because it deviated from the sound of his previous project". Some said Interscope was "discouraged by the tepid audience reception", writes Swan. Although Gordon regards it as "one of the biggest mysteries in neo-soul history", Bilal believes the rumors to all be "the truth to a certain extent" and adds that he also considered people in his inner circle when initially assessing the leak. Ron Hart of Blurt attributes the leak to "an industry insider" and calls it a "career near-death experience" for the singer, while Bonafide Magazine's Alex Naghshineh says it rendered the album's title "tragically ironic".

Love for Sale's shelving distressed Bilal for some time and made him consider retiring from music. As he explains, "I was really into that music that I was doing, and not being able to release it properly took a lot out of me." According to The Shadow League's music contributor Travis Larrier, it appeared for a moment that he would become another artist from "the soul music vanguard" of the late 1990s and early 2000s to succumb to professional setbacks and fade from the public view, as was the case with D'Angelo and the singer-rapper Lauryn Hill. Interscope released Bilal from his contract soon after, while retaining the masters for all his music.

== Touring ==
With Love for Sale's growing following, Bilal became increasingly in demand for concert performances. He began touring and performing the album's songs, introducing them as "MySpace hits" and "bootleg specials". His live band during this period included Glasper, Conley "Tone" Whitfield on bass, and Chris "Daddy" Dave on drums; this line-up would accompany Bilal for his tenure on the singer Jill Scott's The Real Thing Tour (2008).

The concerts were lucrative for Bilal, who witnessed the album's popularity among live audiences singing along verbatim to the songs. "People would have it on their iPods and knew the songs", he says recalling its impact. "It was kind of a blessing in disguise. We were able to tour off of that album which is crazy." In the opinion of AllMusic biographer Andy Kellman, Bilal must have felt conflicted when performing the songs to "appreciative crowds who knew the material – off a technically unreleased album – inside out".

=== Performances and response ===
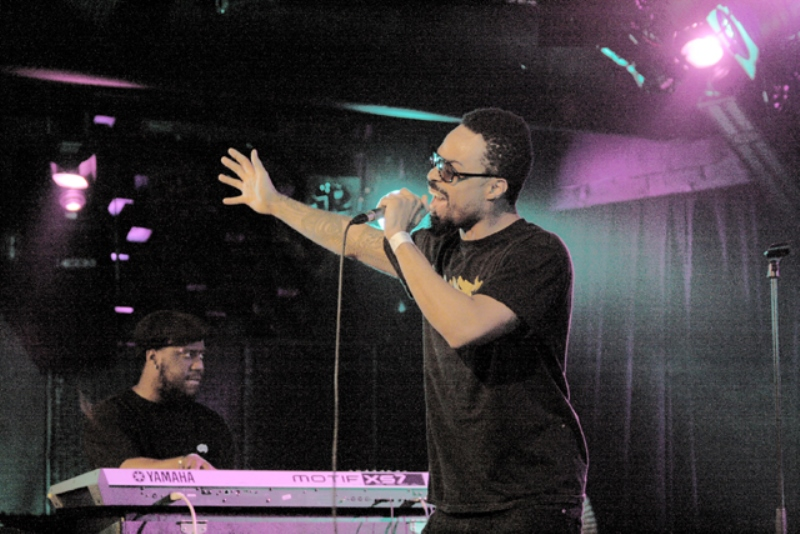
Bilal (right) with Glasper at the A38 concert hall in Budapest, May 2008. The singer toured on the strength of the leaked album's popularity.

While taking a break from writing music, Bilal focused his artistic ambitions on live performance and quickly developed a reputation for erraticism on stage. As Portland Mercury journalist Jalylah Burrell chronicles, he performed in a "hyper-expressive" manner similarly to Prince and the Rolling Stones, creating a "delirium" in concert that was undercut by "his ostensible unhappiness and occasional erratic behavior"; in her opinion, "he didn't look like a man who enjoyed being on stage despite his deftness at it." "People might've thought I was on drugs or intoxicated, but that wasn't it", Bilal explains to Philadelphia Weekly. "I just didn't give a fuck because I was looking for the art. I wanted to be out, like when John Coltrane started playing with his wife, Alice. I just wanted to rip open music with my voice."

According to Spectrum Culture journalist Chaz Kangas, while Love for Sale became one of the music industry's "worst-kept secrets", Bilal's "unrelenting and awe-inspiring" concerts during this period attracted even those listeners who generally disliked contemporary soul music. Tamara P. Carter, a writer living in London at the time, had felt disillusioned with mainstream music from the U.S. and reluctantly attended Bilal's performance at the Jazz Café in July 2006 with her friends. In her observations, the singer opened the show with a crooning wail resembling "a weeping willow in a summer's breeze", eventually morphing into "electric drum-cracking thunder" that channeled "the cries of his ancestors" or Hendrix's guitar (the Fender Stratocaster). The opening provoked screams and obscenities from some in the audience, as it gravitated toward the stage, and an overflow of emotion in Carter:

I'm thrashed into the crowd – waves of vengeance unleashing from his microphone. Vengeance on love. On pain. On an industry who may recognize his genius as remotely as 17th-century literature did Nietzsche's. A girl throws her hands into the air and screams. A Rasta yells obscenities. Bilal kicks the mic stand, overwhelmed by his own power. No longer reluctant, I'm pushed with the sea of bodies towards the stage.

The show left Carter "drenched in sweat" and convinced that Bilal is a "sorcerer of modern soul" who can "transform the dead into a living, soulful exuberance", she later wrote in Wax Poetics. Attending his January 2007 show at the Black Cat nightclub in Washington, D.C., Godfrey also observed the ardent fan support for his new songs and was especially impressed by the rendition of "Make Me Over", featuring a break in the bridge section that evoked the music of James Brown. "Bilal's incredible range has never sounded better, and he's never seemed more euphoric", Godfrey concluded in her review for the Post.

== Aftermath and legacy ==
Love for Sale's widely positive reception among critics and audiences eventually inspired Bilal to begin writing new songs as he was starting a family. "Because the music was so good, it kind of created a life of its own", he tells Gray. "It broke away into a space where I was able to be free to do what I wanted to do." Having matured as an artist from the album's saga, he composed music purely for his own artistic fulfillment. He compares the development to how the rapper 50 Cent had his vocal delivery changed by a shooting to the face: "So in life, I guess, a certain pain, a certain fermentation, the same thing that happens to some good wine, set in." He also changed his business associations and became more prudent about in-studio use and safeguarding of computerized equipment, which had still been relatively new during Love for Sale's recording. (Note: In an interview with Hadley, Bilal recounts how Erykah Badu stressed to him the importance of carrying his own hard disk drive to recording sessions and demanding the studio delete its copy.)

Meanwhile, "the album's mystique and legacy grew as one of the most notable casualties of the digital piracy era" as well as "one of the most stunning and progressive musical statements of its generation", according to Larrier. While remaining obscure in the mainstream, Bilal developed a respected reputation among other artists and was pursued as a featured hook singer for their recordings in the years after the leak, when Love for Sale became what Lindsey describes as "a much-bootlegged favorite amongst R&B enthusiasts" and "the black-music equivalent of Fiona Apple's once-shelved (and also notoriously bootlegged) album Extraordinary Machine". Larrier explains that its genre-defying direction distinguished Bilal artistically from his peers in soul during a creatively stagnant period for the genre, while in Gipson's estimation, it showcased an experimentation outside of soul that would culminate in the singer's next album.

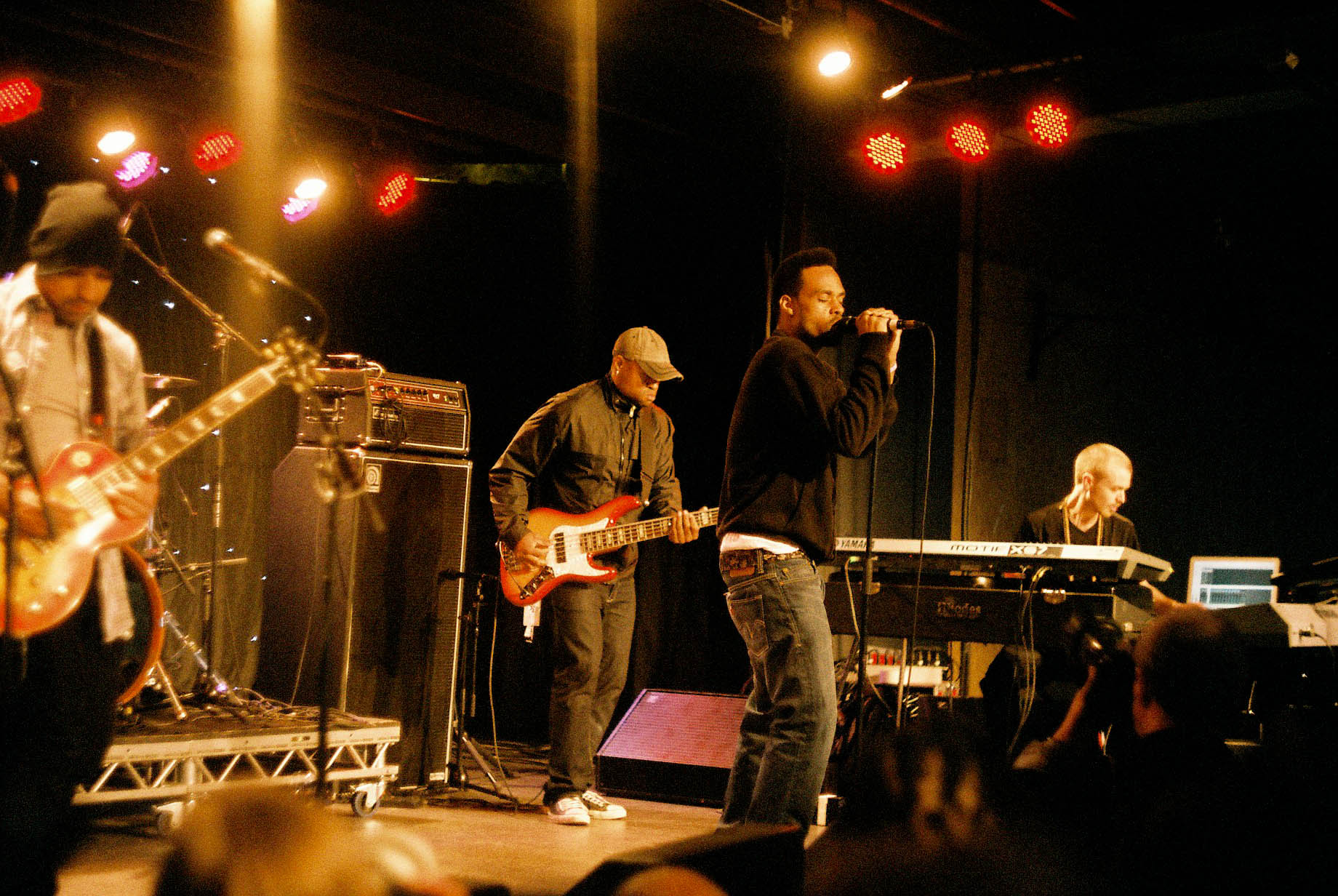
Bilal on his 2011 Little One Tour, in which he continued to perform Love for Sale's songs

Love for Sale's repute helped create buzz for Bilal's third album, Airtight's Revenge, released in 2010 by Plug Research, an independent record label that the singer was connected to through Sa-Ra's Shafiq Husayn. Bilal titled the album as a reference to him avenging the circumstances of Love for Sale's leak. Experimenting further with rock and electronic sounds as well as darker storytelling, Airtight's Revenge widely impressed fans and critics but failed to eclipse its predecessor's renown. Bilal believes "the real revenge" was how Love for Sale had become such an "underground" triumph in spite of "the whole long, drawn-out standstill" with Interscope, comparing it to the myth of the phoenix rising. Its following continued to be evident through the Little One Tour, his 2011 concert tour supporting Airtight's Revenge. In attendance for one of the concerts in St. Louis, Jerome A. Redding of The St. Louis American observed the venue "filled with cult followers as the audience sang along line for line" to Bilal's opening performances of Love for Sale songs.

Fans of Bilal regard Love for Sale as his masterpiece. Both Cunningham and Kevin C. Johnson of the St. Louis Post-Dispatch call it his best album, while Erin E. Evans of The Root describes it as "a near cult classic" and Gipson deems it a "tour de force cult classic". From Gordon's perspective, the album remains "a veritable classic", highly valued by "any self-respecting music collector". Donald "Donwill" Freeman, from the rap group Tanya Morgan, has named it one of his five favorite albums at one point, and the singer-rapper DRAM, who discovered the leak as a teenager, calls it "phenomenal", highlighting the low-tempo "tribal jungle love" song "White Turns to Grey" as his favorite "hidden gem" in music. Hart considers Love for Sale the "great 'lost' [soul] album" of its generation with a continued presence in "online purgatory", while in Kellman's opinion, had it received a commercial release, the album would have been representative of the alternative R&B that developed later in the 2000s.

After the alt-R&B singers Frank Ocean and the Weeknd freely released their own albums online in 2011, The Music magazine's Cyclone Wehner credited Bilal with having "pioneered [this] very promotional strategy" through Love for Sale, "ironically". Reflecting on its impact, Bilal says it was "a bad thing that turned into a – I wouldn't say a good thing because it would've been good if it came out. But it kind of turned into this little, ironic twist to my life". Larrier believes the "tour de force" album's story is crucial to honestly appraising the singer's career.

=== Bilal's collaborators ===
McKie, Glasper, and Husayn all went on to work further with Bilal after Love for Sale, contributing to Airtight's Revenge and 2013's A Love Surreal. McKie considers his production and drumming on Love for Sale among the best of his career and says the album was "wild" and "innovative", as it "crossed a lot of boundaries". Glasper, a frequent collaborator of Bilal's, also believes the singer was innovative in recording the album, predating similar music that André 3000 would record for his hip hop duo OutKast's split double album Speakerboxxx/The Love Below (2003).

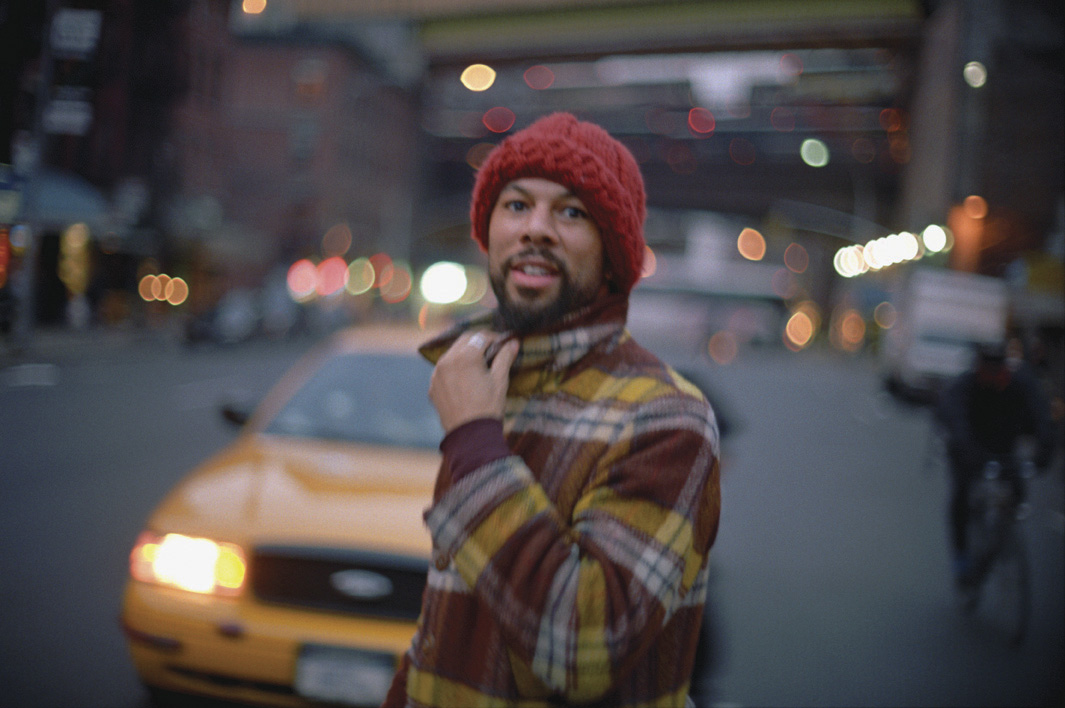
Common (2003), one of Bilal's regular collaborators since the album

Common also continued collaborating with Bilal in the years following Love for Sale, beginning with the rapper's 2002 album Electric Circus. In 2011, they reunited for an outdoor concert performance in Los Angeles and were filmed by the multimedia artist Michael Sterling Eaton, who used the footage to create a music video for their original "Sorrow, Tears & Blood" recording.

=== Availability ===
Love for Sale's recording sessions had produced several discarded tracks, including a cover of the soul musician Stevie Wonder's "Rocket Love" (1980). According to McKie, he and Bilal tried to include them on Airtight's Revenge, but "the label erased the file for whatever reason". A live version of "Rocket Love" appeared in 2012 on The Retrospection, a career-spanning mixtape of Bilal's music curated by the DJ Vikter Duplaix. The mixtape also featured the Love for Sale tracks "You're All I Need (Feels Like Heaven)", "Gotsta Be Cool", and "Hollywood", as well as the rapper Jay Electronica's remix of "Something to Hold on To". Bilal says there are nine unheard songs he recorded for Love for Sale that he "loved" and different versions of the original 12 he prefers to the leaked mix, which "maybe one day" Interscope will let go.

Bilal had planned for some time to release Love for Sale through E1 Music, the label that would release A Love Surreal, but the idea fell through for reasons he did not define. Along with Interscope's involvement, he suggests that his previous contract with a music publishing company, from the Love for Sale period, remains an impediment to its release. According to Covert's 2006 report, another label could have acquired publishing rights to the album beginning in 2021. As of 2020, its songs remain available on YouTube.

== Track listing ==
Information is taken from a promotional pressing of the album.

Love for Sale track listing
No.	Title	Length
1.	"Something to Hold on To"	4:06
2.	"You're All I Need (Feels Like Heaven)"	4:43
3.	"Gotsta Be Cool"	5:38
4.	"Make Me Over"	5:17
5.	"Get Out of My Hair"	4:23
6.	"Lord Don't Let It"	5:08
7.	"All for Love"	4:47
8.	"Hands of Time"	3:45
9.	"Hollywood"	3:38
10.	"White Turns to Grey"	6:17
11.	"Sorrow, Tears & Blood"	7:43
12.	"Sweet, Sour U"	3:23

== See also ==
- List of alumni of The New School for Jazz and Contemporary Music
- Jeanius – an album by Jean Grae, also leaked and controversially shelved
- Kamaal the Abstract – an album by Q-Tip, also originally shelved over commercial concerns and leaked
- Music piracy

== Bibliography ==
- Abdusalaam, Ismael (August 14, 2010). "Exclusive: Bilal on His New Album's Concept and Corporate Conformity in Today's Black Music". Beats, Boxing and Mayhem.
- Amorosi, A.D. (November 30, 2010). "Bilal Impresses at World Cafe Live". The Philadelphia Inquirer.
- Anon. (2003). Love for Sale (LP label). Bilal. Universal Records. MOTRBILAL – 20988-1.
- Anon. (April 18, 2006). "Aa.Vv.: Exit Music – Songs with Radio Heads". All About Jazz Italia.
- Anon. (2012). "Bilal – The Retrospective Mixtape Free MP3 Download + Full Stream Curated by Vikter Duplaix". soulhead.
- Anon. (November 11, 2014). "Bilal Wystąpił w Warszawskim Basenie". JazzSoul.pl (in Polish).
- Anon. (April 8, 2016). "Standard Sounds Goes Searching for Hidden Gems". The Standard Hotels.
- Bilal (June 16, 2010). "A Long Convo with ... Bilal". Vibe (Interview). Interviewed by Civil Writes.
- Bilal (July 7, 2010). "A Quick Chat with... Bilal". fabric blog (Interview). Interviewed by Smash Gordon.
- Bilal (August 5, 2010). "Bilal: 'Airtight' Holds Water". MyAliya.com (Interview). Interviewed by Aliya Ewing. Archived from the original on January 13, 2011.
- Bilal (August 16, 2010). "Bilal: One Man's Revenge". Beats, Boxing and Mayhem (Interview). Interviewed by Ismael Abdusalaam.
- Bilal (August 16, 2010). "Interview with Bilal + 'Someday We'll All Be Free' (Download)". MuphoricSounds (Interview). Interviewed by Roseann V. Warren. Archived from the original on March 7, 2019.
- Bilal (October 19, 2010). "Bilal: 'Airtight's Revenge Was a Therapy ... A Way for Me to Deal'". OC Weekly (Interview). Interviewed by Justin Shady.
- Bilal (September 21, 2010). "The Root Interview: Bilal on Making a Comeback". The Root (Interview). Interviewed by Jozen Cummings.
- Bilal (September 30, 2010). "Jazz and Soul Singer Bilal Oliver". The Sound of Young America (Podcast). No. 143. Interviewed by Jesse Thorn. Maximum Fun.
- Bilal (November 1, 2010). "A Masterful Revenge". Submerge Magazine (Interview). Interviewed by Corey Bloom.
- Bilal (November 4, 2010). "Revenge of the Soulquarian Bilal". Blurt (Interview). Interviewed by Ron Hart.
- Bilal (May 9, 2011). "Bilal Interview – Bonafide Exclusive". Bonafide Magazine (Interview). Interviewed by Alex Nagshineh.
- Bilal (December 11, 2012). "Bilal's Contributions" (Interview). Genius.
- Bilal (February 15, 2013). "Bilal: Soul Survivor". Life and Times (Interview). Interviewed by Quinn Peterson. Archived from the original on April 11, 2016.
- Bilal (March 27, 2013). "Soul, Jazz and R&B Impresario Bilal Makes His Area Debut". Indy Week. Interviewed by Eric Tullis.
- Bingham, Dana (February 18, 2011). "A Conversation with Bilal". John Simon Daily. Archived from the original on February 22, 2011.
- Burrell, Jalylah (October 14, 2010). "The Candy Man Can". Portland Mercury.
- Butta (March 15, 2011). "We're Happy to See Bilal & Common's 'Sorrow Tears and Blood'". SoulBounce.
- Callender, Devon "Von Pea"; Freeman, Donald "Don Will" (August 21, 2017). "Interview: Tanya Morgan Keep It Moving, Whether You're Listening or Not". Albumism (Interview). Interviewed by Ben Pedroche.
- Carter, Tamara P. (January 18, 2013). "Obeah Man". Wax Poetics. Archived from the original on March 13, 2017.
- Chinen, Nate (January 26, 2006). "Like-Minded Colleagues in Search of Something New". The New York Times.
- Coplan, Chris (October 15, 2009). "Bilal Readies First Album in Nearly a Decade". Consequence of Sound.
- Covert, Adrian (September 17, 2006). "Love (Not) for Sale". Prefixmag.
- Cunningham, Jonathan (November 17, 2010). "Philosophy of Flow". Detroit Metro Times.
- DJ Rahdu (n.d.). "Saturday Sample Sessions 009: Myrna Summers – Give Me Something to Hold on To [Part 2]". BamaLoveSoul.com.
- D-Money (September 19, 2011). "Bilal Shows NYC a Lot on 'Little One' Summer Tour". SoulBounce.
- DJ mikecons (June–July 2009). "Beats". Status. No. 7 – via Issuu.
- Dowling, Marcus K. (February 15, 2011). "Reviewed & Interviewed: Bilal at Park @ 14th – Washington, DC – 2/11/10". The Couch Sessions.
- Elevado, Russell (April 8, 2007). "Q+A with Russell Elevado > Bilal Oliver". Gearslutz (Interview). Interviewed by Steamy Williams.
- Erhardt, Mathan (October 26, 2006). "MGF Reviews Bilal – Love for Sale". Inside Pulse.
- Evans, Erin E. (June 27, 2012). "19 Neo-Soul Stars: Then and Now". The Root.
- Farberman, Brad (February 3, 2013). "Steadfast Soul Man Bilal Resumes His Surge to the Top". Time Out.
- Gillespie, Blake (November 11, 2020). "A Brief Guide to the Shape of 'Jazz Rap' Today". Bandcamp Daily.
- Gipson, L. Michael (2010). "Bilal – Airtight's Revenge (2010) (Review)". SoulTracks.
- Godfrey, Sarah (January 29, 2007). "By Grace of MySpace: No New Album, but Bilal Packs Black Cat". The Washington Post.
- Gonzales, Michael (February 6, 2013). "Bilal's Back, Better Than Before". Philadelphia Weekly – via Issuu.
- Gonzales, Michael A. (March 19, 2015). "Love, Peace and Soulquarians". soulhead.
- Gray, Arielle (November 26, 2018). "Bilal Brings Creative Resistance to the Isabella Stewart Gardner Museum". The ARTery. WBUR.
- Haithcoat, Rebecca (October 29, 2010). "Live Review: Bilal at the Echoplex". LA Weekly.
- Herrera, Monica (October 8, 2009). "Bilal to Release Electro-Jazz Rock Album in 2010". Billboard.
- Hull, Tom (August 31, 2020). "Music Week". Tom Hull – on the Web.
- Iai (September 20, 2010). "Bilal – Airtight's Revenge (Album Review)". Sputnikmusic.
- Johnson, Kevin C. (August 18, 2011). "Bilal Brings Full Band to Old Rock House in Soulful Show". St. Louis Post-Dispatch.
- Kangas, Chaz (October 3, 2010). "Bilal: Airtight's Revenge". Spectrum Culture.
- Kellman, Andy (2013). "Bilal". AllMusic. Archived from the original on July 29, 2013.
- Kellman, Andy (n.d.). "Airtight's Revenge – Bilal". AllMusic.
- Koutoudjian, Vasken (December 20, 2016). "Leron Thomas, l'obligation de liberté (entretien)". Culturopoing (in French).
- Larrier, Travis (March 4, 2013). "Bilal Is the Future (And the Present ... And the Past)". The Shadow League.
- Lear, Len (September 4, 2015). "G'tn Singer Hard to Reach but Gaining National Following". Chesnutt Hill Local.
- Lindsey, Craig D. (February 12, 2013). "Five Lesser-Known Soul Men Worth Your Attention". The Village Voice.
- Lindsey, Craig D. (February 25, 2013). "Bilal's New A Love Surreal Was Inspired by Salvador Dali". The Village Voice.
- Lordi, Emily J. (August 23, 2013). "A Praise Song for Bilal by Emily J. Lordi". NewBlackMan (in Exile).
- Machunga, Saminu (August 16, 2016). "10 Famous Artistes Who Sampled the Music of Nigerian Icon, Fela Kuti". TheCable Lifestyle.
- Martinez, Rafael (December 13, 2006). "2006 Staff Picks (Part 3 of 5)". Prefixmag.com.
- McKie, Steve (September 14, 2010). "Meet Bilal's Producer Steve McKie". NODFACTOR.COM (Interview). Interviewed by Jerry L. Barrow. Archived from the original on March 23, 2011.
- Redding, Jerome A. (August 18, 2011). "Bilal's Big Comeback". The St. Louis American.
- Reyes, Andres (Autumn 2010). "Cool on the Outside". Shook. No. 9. pp. 20–22 – via Issuu.
- Schillinger, Liesl (August 12, 2015). "Jimi Hendrix's Electric Lady Studios Turns 45". The Wall Street Journal. Archived from the original on July 31, 2017.
- Scudder, Tara (February 21, 2014). "Recap & Photos: Bilal Listening Session at Harlem Stage". YouKnowIGotSoul.com.
- Swan, Rachel (August 20, 2008). "Rough-Style Romancer". East Bay Express.
- Vaziri, Aidin (September 6, 2016). "Bilal Embraces Artistic Freedom the 2nd Time Around". SFGate.
- Wehner, Cyclone (April 29, 2013). "Soul Searching". The Music.
- Weiner, Natalie (March 16, 2015). "Kendrick Lamar's 'To Pimp a Butterfly': 10 Key Collaborators". Billboard.
- Wild, David (April 10, 2013). "Bilal". Beat Magazine. No. 1366 – via Issuu.
