= Airtight's Revenge =

2010 album by Bilal

Studio album by Bilal
- Released: September 14, 2010
- Recorded: 2008–2010
- Genres: Soul; indie rock; progressive soul; electronic; neo soul; jazz
- Length: 47:52
- Label: Plug Research
- Producers: Bilal; Steve McKie; Nottz; Shafiq Husayn; Conley "Tone" Whitfield; 88-Keys

Bilal chronology
Love for Sale (unreleased)	Airtight's Revenge (2010)	A Love Surreal (2013)

Singles from Airtight's Revenge
- 1. "Restart" Released: 2010; 2. "All Matter" Released: 2010; 3. "Little One" Released: 2010

Airtight's Revenge is the second studio album by American singer-songwriter Bilal. It was released on September 14, 2010, by the independent record label Plug Research, his first album for the label.

Bilal began composing music for the album using the recording software GarageBand, while touring in the aftermath of his unreleased but widely leaked album Love for Sale. He wrote and recorded Airtight's Revenge during a period of approximately three years, working alongside the musician-producers Steve McKie, Nottz, Shafiq Husayn, Conley "Tone" Whitfield, and 88-Keys. The album's soul and rock music is more electronic- and guitar-oriented than Bilal's previous albums, featuring influences from jazz, blues, and futurism. Experiences from his personal life and professional conflicts with his former label, Interscope Records, formed the inspiration for the album's dark songwriting, which explores themes of love, spirituality, capitalism, and politics, with lyrics informed by free thought.

The album debuted at number 106 on the US Billboard 200 chart, selling 4,600 copies in its first week. Although it charted modestly, Airtight's Revenge was well received by music critics upon its release. PopMatters ranked the album number 61 in its year-end list of best albums for 2010, calling it a "wildly inventive, wildly enjoyable album".

== Writing and recording ==
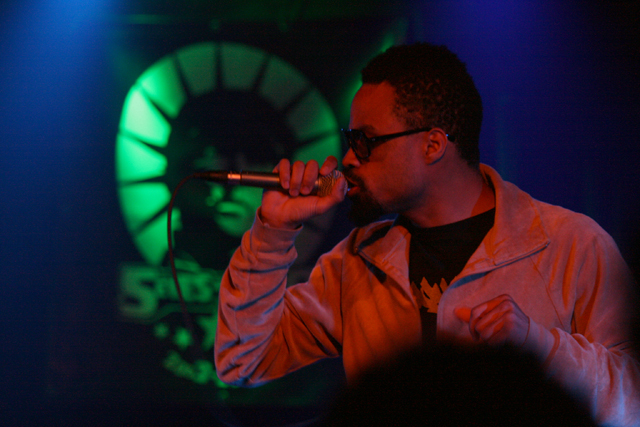
Bilal on tour in May 2008

Bilal worked on the album intermittently for approximately three years, with the singer saying he began creating its music "around 2008". While touring in response to the popularity of Love for Sale, his controversially shelved but leaked album, Bilal began composing new music on his computer using the digital audio workstation GarageBand. Recalling the process, he says, "It sort of starts on the piano and then I go to the Garage Band and make, like, a little sketch of something I can sing to and then go from there. It allows me play around with the shape of the song more." The songs were variously written in New York, Los Angeles, Philadelphia, and Amsterdam.

When writing the lyrics, Bilal says he wanted to approach expressing free thought in different ways and tried to "write short stories and dark tales of life in general". He drew inspiration from his personal experiences, as well as "a lot of things from fiction" in an effort to "make certain statements, from a love standpoint", he explains. Bilal adds that his experience with Love for Sale and the ensuing conflict with his then-record label Interscope led him to the "dark underworld" storytelling of Airtight's Revenge.

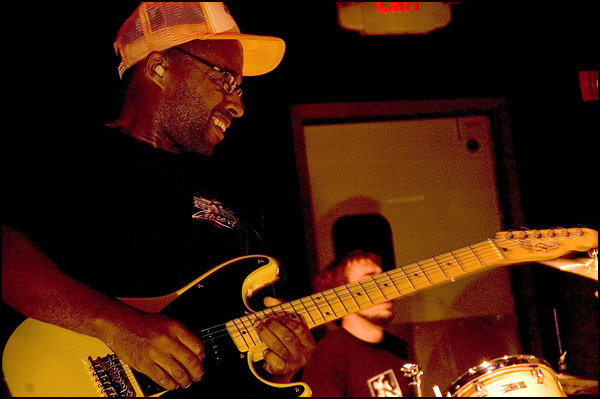
Chuck Treece (shown in 2005) played guitar on several songs

After hearing some of Bilal's GarageBand compositions, his touring drummer persuaded him to record one of the songs at the former's studio. By doing so, Bilal felt inspired to record further. In the studio, the singer held improvisatory sessions with his accompanying musicians, comparing it to jazz or "a Led Zeppelin show". In contrast to his previous albums, Bilal pursued a more guitar-led direction based in rock and soul, with influences from jazz, blues, and electronic music. He utilized ideas from the music of Frank Zappa, who he says "was dope at that; mixing a lot different artists in a band to create one distinct sound". Recording with a smaller budget than previously for Interscope, he found that "you don't need to be in a gigantic studio, you just need to be in a good room with acoustics and be creative with how you mic things or use things."

I want to make music that is going to confuse the computer.

— Bilal (2015)

Bilal collaborated with producers Shafiq Husayn, Nottz, 88-Keys, and, most prominently, Steve McKie. A drummer-producer who had recorded with the singer on Love for Sale, McKie was eager to work on Airtight's Revenge after listening to Bilal's preliminary compositions on GarageBand. McKie began recording with Bilal in late 2008, starting with 13 compositions and eventually co-producing seven of the album's songs. As McKie explains, "We just went through a bunch of sounds, locked ourselves in the studio and experimented with different snare drums and kicks. It took a bunch of time because we had that freedom to just experiment and be creative." In an interview soon after the album's release in late 2010, Bilal said that he and McKie "put the finishing touches and tightened everything up over the last year".

== Music and lyrics ==
"Restart"
A 30-second sample of the song, which features a guitar-led production with an irregular rhythm

Airtight's Revenge has been described as a mix of soul, rock, jazz, blues, and electronic styles. Referencing Bilal's intention to create music that would challenge a computer, Pitchfork writer Marcus J. Moore says it explains the music's "iconoclastic nature" and how it "largely eschewed Bilal's earlier throwback aesthetic for a denser electronic sound". According to NPR's Frannie Kelley, "the sound here is more electronic than the neo-soul of the Soulquarians' heyday ... The production is heavily layered, with several Bilals often singing at once." Prefixmag.com's Andrew Martin says it "owes more to contemporary album-oriented indie rock than pop, R&B or hip-hop", while Michael Hewlett from the Winston-Salem Journal calls it "sped-up rock and jazz". In the opinion of HipHopDX journalist Luke Gibson, "the production is to [sic] experimental to be called Neo Soul, to [sic] funky to be called Acid Jazz, and to [sic] free-form to be Funk".

Bilal's brand [of soul] is utterly contemporary, meaning it's a mix of everything that's come before while adding a raft of futuristic sonic touches. At its heart is the classic, album-oriented prog soul of the '70s, with a strong, jazzy undercurrent, but it's much more than that. Bilal's reedy, Sly-meets-Prince voice runs down metaphysical and personal subjects overtop a continuously changing musical landscape...

— David Dacks (Exclaim!, 2010)

Lyrically, the album explores a wider range of subjects than Bilal's previous albums, including love, spirituality, politics, economics, and religion. Evan Rytlewski of The A.V. Club later named it among "a line of revelatory, late-period neo-soul albums", including Maxwell's BLACKsummers'night (2009), Erykah Badu's New Amerykah Part Two (Return of the Ankh) (2010), and Frank Ocean's Channel Orange (2012). According to David Dacks of Exclaim!, "every second screams personal statement, from the weighty, heartfelt lyrics to Bilal's anguished, soulful vocals. There are no throwaway skits or breezy in-da-club jams; it's 100 percent pure soul. "

"Restart", written about resuming a relationship, features varying bridge sections and a soul/rock groove. The track "Little One" is based on Bilal's relationship with his then-nine-year-old son, who is autistic. "The Dollar" features oddly-timed percussion, subdued guitar and keys, strings, bluesy horns, and lyrical themes concerning poverty and the pitfalls of capitalism.

== Title and packaging ==
In an interview for The Root, Bilal elaborated on the album title's meaning, stating:

Well, the meaning of the title is reflecting all the stuff I've been through in the last nine years, with my album Love for Sale being bootlegged, and getting in conflict with my label and it never coming out. Just the whole long, drawn-out standstill behind it and how it kind of turned into a phoenix-rising type of deal, with people giving it mad love online and just became this underground type of sensation. So that's the real revenge, the music couldn't be shut down or hidden, but people got it and they loved it, just like I loved making it. That was the meaning behind 'revenge,' and 'Airtight' is just an old nickname that I got. Back in the day, I used to really be into reading Donald Goines and Iceberg Slim. I casually read both of their whole catalogs, and they inspired me as a songwriter also, but there's a book Iceberg Slim wrote and the title is Airtight Willie & Me. I kind of kept that name, 'Airtight.' And I think even back then I thought it would be dope to have an album with the title Airtight-something, so Airtight's Revenge sounded like a black exploitation film. It kind of fit the scenario.

The album's cover art is a reference to the iconic photo of Malcolm X peering through his window while holding a M1 carbine rifle. Instead of a rifle, Bilal is holding a microphone, and instead of peering through his bedroom curtain, Bilal is peering through a heavy red stage curtain. In an interview with Parlour Magazine, Bilal elaborated on the message behind the album's cover art, stating:

I'm killing them with the words. This album was my version of Marvin Gaye's "What's Going On" and a retrospective look on the world and where we are today. There’s not a lot of music like that these days. It almost like some people today have the mental concept of if the world’s going to blow up tomorrow, let’s just get drunk, high and party and if shit blow up, we blow up… I made a record that was my retrospect on that mentality.

== Marketing and sales ==
The album was released by Plug Research, an independent label based in Los Angeles. Its earliest release was in the UK on September 6, 2010. In the US, it debuted at number 101 on the Billboard 200 chart, with first-week sales of 4,600 copies. It peaked at number 21 on Billboard's Top R&B/Hip-Hop Albums and at number 23 on its Independent Albums chart. Airtight's Revenge has sold 4,800 copies in the United States.

== Critical reception ==
Professional ratings
Aggregate scores
Source	Rating
Metacritic	87/100
Review scores
Source	Rating
AllMusic	5/5 stars
The A.V. Club	B+
HipHopDX	4/5
Philadelphia Daily News	A
The Philadelphia Inquirer	3.5/4 stars
PopMatters	9/10
Spin	8/10
Time Out	3/5 stars
URB	4/5 stars
USA Today	3.5/4 stars

Airtight's Revenge was met with widespread critical acclaim. At Metacritic, which assigns a normalized rating out of 100 to reviews from professional publications, the album received an average score of 87, based on nine reviews.

Reviewing for AllMusic, Andy Kellman called Airtight's Revenge "one heavy, messy, dynamite album — one that could take a decade to be fully processed". Tyler Lewis of PopMatters cited the album as "a generation-defining masterwork of unflinching vision" and wrote that it is "all about texture and musicality. Songs more than shout or intimate their ideas, they envelop you fully, so you feel the full weight of what it is Bilal is talking about". Los Angeles Times journalist Jeff Weiss noted its "formless floating funk" and praised Bilal as "ludicrously soulful and endearingly experimental", calling the album "a soothing anodyne to the often over-processed come-ons that pass for contemporary R&B". The Philadelphia Inquirer's A.D. Amorosi stated, "Bilal - the vocalist - opens the valves and bleats, glides, coos, and cajoles like Coltrane at his freest". The A.V. Club's Nathan Rabin perceived a "brooding, airless intensity" and praised its "claustrophobic introspection and soul-searching". Sputnikmusic's Nick Butler said that, "musically, there are dozens of neo-soul records in the past three or four years that reach far beyond the limits of most of Airtight's Revenge [...] but nobody is writing or delivering lyrics like this. Emotionally, [it] is so revealing that it gets difficult to listen to". In a year-end article on overlooked albums in 2010, Edna Gundersen of USA Today described Airtight's Revenge a "buried jewel that really deserved a wider audience", commenting that "It's personal, idiosyncratic, complex, dense, sophisticated and messy, a thoroughly contemporary soul record with a defiant indie-rock sensibility, which is why it never found a home on radio".

Some reviewers were less enthusiastic. Mikael Wood of Time Out found the album overlong, particularly the second half, which he said "bogs down with an abundance of noodly slow jams. But the strong stuff here is very strong". URB's Anupamistry wrote that it lacks "the cut-loose, flailing vocal work" of Bilal's previous work, but ultimately complimented its "more progressive, less structured, arranging". Apart from a few overdone "rock guitar histrionics", Dacks wrote in his review for Exclaim! that the album "has something for everyone who appreciates the entire spectrum of soul".

== Track listing ==
No.	Title	Producer(s)	Length
1.	"Cake & Eat It Too"	Bilal Oliver, Steve McKie	4:00
2.	"Restart"	Bilal Oliver, Steve McKie	4:54
3.	"All Matter"	Bilal Oliver, Steve McKie	5:21
4.	"Flying"	Bilal Oliver, Nottz	4:21
5.	"Levels"	Shafiq Husayn, Bilal Oliver	5:27
6.	"Little One"	Conley Whitfield	3:59
7.	"Move On"	Bilal Oliver, Steve McKie	3:28
8.	"Robots"	Bilal Oliver, Steve McKie	3:17
9.	"The Dollar"	Bilal Oliver, Steve McKie	3:29
10.	"Who Are You"	Bilal Oliver, Steve McKie	6:03
11.	"Think It Over"	88-Keys	3:49

== Personnel ==
=== Musicians ===
- Bilal Oliver – vocals, keyboards (tracks: 1, 4, 5, 10), synthesizer (2, 3), piano (2, 5), organ (3, 9, 10), human beat box (3), synthesizer bass (7), horn/string arrangements (9, 11)
- Masayuki Hirano – Moog electric piano (1), keyboards (2, 8), Moog and synthesizer (4, 5)
- Junius Bervine – synthesizer and Fender Rhodes electric piano (1)
- Robert Glasper – piano (7), Fender Rhodes (9)
- Mike Severson – guitar, electric guitar (1, 5, 7, 8, 10, 11)
- Chuck Treece – electric guitar (2, 3, 8, 9), effects (3, 8)
- Ben "Bananas" O'Neil – lead guitar (2), acoustic guitar (10)
- Tom Spiker – electric guitar (3)
- Freddie Mac – acoustic and electric guitar, bass (4)
- Derrick Hodge – electric bass (1)
- Conley "Tone" Whitfield – electric bass (2, 3, 6, 8, 10), guitar (6, 10), piano and drums (6)
- Stephen Bruner – electric bass (5, 11)
- Steve McKie – drums (1–3, 5, 7–10), drum programming (3, 7–9)
- Nottz – drum programming (4)
- KenBts. – modular synthesizer and drum programming (5)
- Shafiq Husayn – drum programming (5)
- Miguel Atwood-Ferguson – synthesizer strings and string arrangements (5, 11)
- Horns on tracks 9 and 10

- Lamont Caldwell – saxophone
- Leon Jordan, Jr. – trumpet
- Jermaine Bryson – trombone
- Damon Bryson – tuba

=== Production ===
- Bilal Oliver – producer (1–5, 7–10)
- Steve McKie – producer (1–3, 7–10), engineer (1–3, 5–11)
- Nottz – engineer and producer (4)
- Frederick G. McIntosh – co-producer (4)
- Darryl Sloan – engineer (4)
- Shafiq Husayn – producer (5)
- KenBts. – engineer and co-producer (5)
- Conley "Tone" Whitfield – engineer and producer (6)
- Dan Raaf – engineer (8)
- 88-Keys – producer (11)
- Jason Goldstein – mixing
- Arnold Mischkulnig – mastering
- Andrew Lojero – executive producer, A&R
- Allen Avanessian – executive producer
- Hawk Burns – executive producer
- Brent Rollins The Design Explosion! – artwork
- Eric Coleman – photography

== Charts ==
Chart (2010)	Peak position
US Billboard 200	106
US Billboard Top R&B/Hip-Hop Albums	21
US Billboard Independent Albums	23

== See also ==
- New Amerykah Part One (4th World War), a 2008 album by singer-songwriter and fellow Soulquarian member Erykah Badu, featuring Bilal and also conceived using GarageBand
