= Little One (Bilal song) =

Single by Bilal

from the album Airtight's Revenge
- Released: September 14, 2010
- Recorded: 2009
- Genre: R&B
- Length: 3:58
- Label: Plug Research
- Songwriter: Bilal Oliver
- Producer: Conley "Tone" Whitfield

Bilal singles chronology
"All Matter" (2010)	"Little One" (2010)

"Little One" is a song by American soul/jazz artist Bilal. The song is the second single from his album Airtight's Revenge. The song earned him a second Grammy Award nomination for Best Urban/Alternative Performance.

== Music video ==
Both the song and the video deal with the subject of autistic children, with the latter telling the story of a family discovering the son is autistic. The video, dedicated to Bilal's autistic son Bashir, stars actors Erica Hubbard, Dorian Missick (Mooz-lum, The Cape), and NFL star Sinorice Moss and is directed by Matthew A. Cherry.

== Track listing ==
US Digital MP3 single

No.	Title	Length
1.	"Levels" (CD Version)	3:58
