= Bor (name) =

Bor is a surname and a given name. Notable people with this name include:

== Surname ==
- Andy Bor (born 1963), Australian ski coach and sighted guide for visually impaired skiers
- Barna Bor (born 1968), Hungarian judoka and Olympics competitor
- Dávid Bor (born 1994), Hungarian footballer
- Dekel Bor, Israeli jazz guitarist and composer
- Eleanor Bor (1898–1957), British travel writer; wife of Norman Bor
- Guy Thornton Bor (a.k.a. Max Adrian; 1903–1973), Irish actor and singer
- Hilda Bor (1910–1993), British classical pianist
- Hillary Bor (born 1989), Kenyan-born American track and field athlete
- Jamtsyn Bor (born 1958), Mongolian wrestler
- Jan Bor (1886–1943), Czech theater director and playwright
- Katalin Bor (born 1990), Hungarian swimmer and Olympics competitor
- Matej Bor (a.k.a. Vladimir Pavšič; 1913–1993), Slovene poet, translator, playwright, journalist and partisan
- Milan Bor (1936–1998), German sound engineer
- Modesta Bor (1926–1998), Venezuelan composer
- Nathan Bor (1913–1972), American boxer, Olympic medalist
- Norman Bor (1893–1972), Irish Botanist; husband of Eleanor Bor
- Paulus Bor (c.1601–1669), Dutch painter
- Pieter Bor (1559–1635), Dutch writer and historian
- Vane Bor (a.k.a. Stevan Živadinović; 1908–1993), Serbian artist
- Walter Bor (1916–1999), Austrian-born British urban planner and architect
- Zsolt Bor (born 1949), Hungarian physicist

== Given name ==
- Bor Pavlovčič (born 1998), Slovenian ski jumper
- Bor S. Luh (1916–2001), Chinese-born American food scientist and educator

== See also ==
- Bór (disambiguation)
- BOR (disambiguation)
- Bors (disambiguation)
- Bors, the elder and the younger, legendary Arthurian knights
