= Bor =

Bor may refer to:

== Populated places ==
- Bor (Tachov District), a town in Plzeň Region, Czech Republic
- Bor, Petnjica, Montenegro, a village
- Bór (disambiguation), various settlements in Poland
- Bor, Russia, various inhabited localities in Russia
- Bor District, a district in Serbia
  - Bor, Serbia, a town in Bor District
- Bor, South Sudan, the capital of Jonglei State, South Sudan
- Bor County, Jonglei State, South Sudan
- Bor, Sweden, a village
- Bor, Niğde, a district center of Niğde Province, Turkey

== People ==
- Bor (name), people with the surname or given name

== Other ==
- Bor Airport (South Sudan)
- Bor (PKP station), a former railway station in Hel, Poland
- Bor (Martian crater)
- Bor language (disambiguation), two languages in South Sudan
- Bor rifle, Polish sniper rifle
- OFK Bor, a football club based in Bor, Serbia
- Borr, sometimes anglicized Bor, a god in Norse mythology, father of the god Odin
- Bor (comics), an Asgardian in the Marvel Universe
- Bill of rights
- Bor fruit, more commonly known as Ber

== See also ==
- Bór (disambiguation)
- BOR (disambiguation)
- Bors (disambiguation)
- Borş (disambiguation)
