= Baignes-Sainte-Radegonde =

- Commune
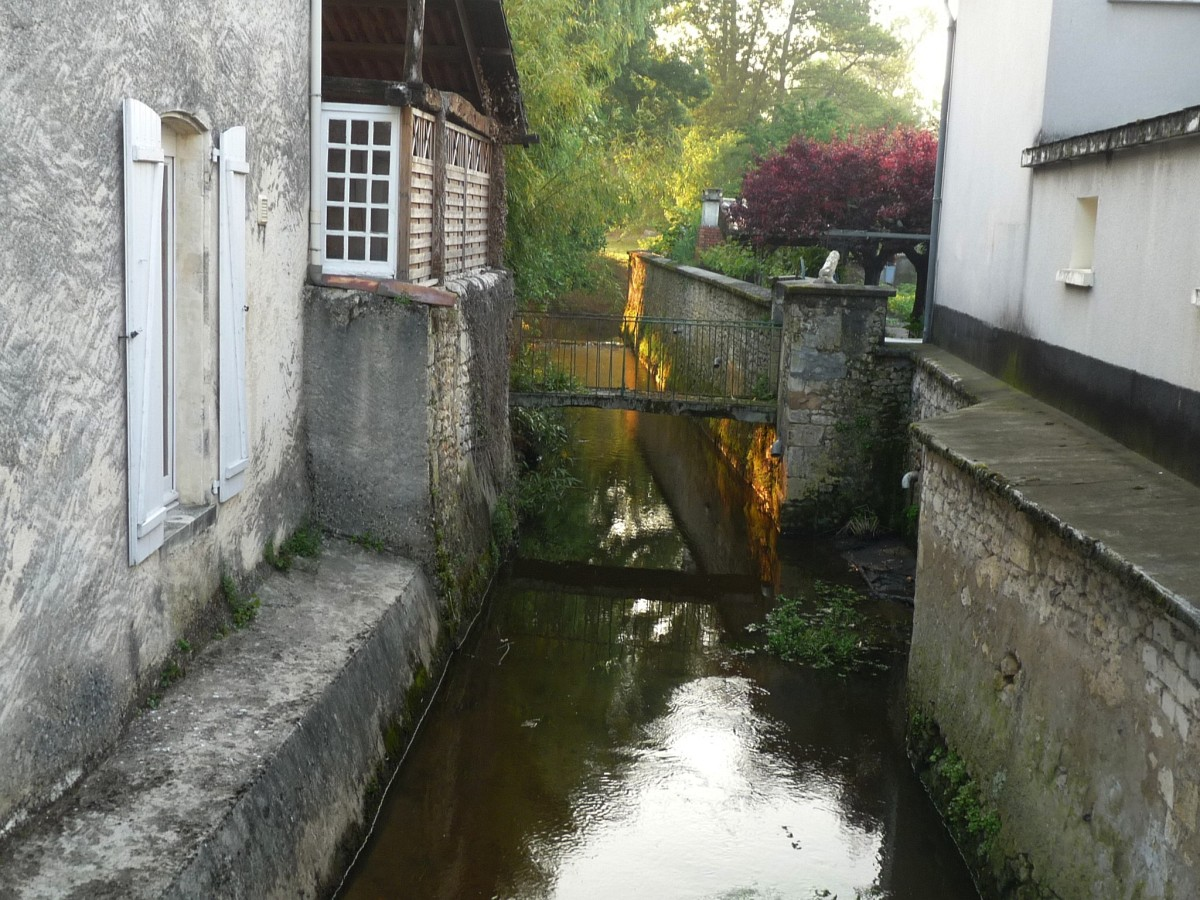
- The Pharaon at Baignes-Sainte-Radegonde

- Coat of arms
- Location of Baignes-Sainte-Radegonde
- Location within France Location within Nouvelle-Aquitaine
- Coordinates: 45°23′05″N 0°14′06″W
- Country: France
- Region: Nouvelle-Aquitaine
- Department: Charente
- Arrondissement: Cognac
- Canton: Charente-Sud

Government
  - Mayor (2020–2026): Michel Dubojski
- Area^{1}: 31.22 km^{2} (12.05 sq mi)
- Elevation: 75 m (246 ft)
- Highest elevation: 148 m (486 ft)
- Lowest elevation: 51 m (167 ft)
- Population (2023): 1,254
  - Density: 40.17/km^{2} (104.0/sq mi)
- Time zone: UTC+01:00 (CET)
  - Summer (DST): UTC+02:00 (CEST)
- INSEE/Postal code: 16025 /16360
- ^{1} French Land Register data, which excludes lakes, ponds, glaciers > 1 km^{2} (0.386 sq mi or 247 acres) and river estuaries.

Baignes-Sainte-Radegonde (French pronunciation: [bɛɲ sɛ̃t ʁadɡɔ̃d]) is a commune in the Charente department in the Nouvelle-Aquitaine region of south-western France.

The commune has been awarded one flower by the National Council of Towns and Villages in Bloom in the Competition of cities and villages in Bloom.

== Geography ==
Baignes-Sainte-Radegonde is the capital of its Canton and also of Petit Angoumois, a natural region of pine forests and lakes in the south-west of Charente. The commune is located some 15 km south-east of Jonzac and 18 km north of Montlieu-la-Garde. The northern, western, and southern borders of the commune are also the departmental border between Charente and Charente-Maritime. The town is located on the eastern border of the commune and is accessed by the D2 from Brossac in the south-east which passes through the town then continues west, changing to the D152 in Charente-Maritime, then continuing south-west to Montendre. The D14 comes from Le Tâtre in the north-east passing through the town and continuing south-east, changing to the D155 in Charente-Maritime, to Bran. The D100 goes north-west from the town, changing to the D152E1 in Charente-Maritime, to Saint-Maigrin. The D38 goes north from the town to Lamérac. The D132 branches from the D38 south of the town and goes south-east to Bors and also branches off the D2 in the west and goes north-west, changing to the D142E2 in Charente-Maritime, to Mortiers. The D446 branches from the D2 in the west of the commune and goes south-east, changing to the D255 in Charente-Maritime, to Vanzac. Route nationale N10 (E606) forms the south-eastern border of the commune.

There are several hamlets in the commune apart from the town: Chez Merle, La Perdasse, Puygareau, Chez Boutin, Les Clonnieries, Montmille, Mathelon, Chardes, and Pilledoux.

=== Geology and terrain ===
A large part of the centre and west of the commune is from the Campanian period with chalky limestone from the Late Cretaceous which covers a large part of the southern Charente and Chrente-Maritime departments. The north and the south-east have terrain of kaolinic sandstone, clay, and pebbles dating from the Tertiary period. These soils are often covered in pine forests and are on the north-western edge of the Double saintongeaise forestry region.

The western part of the commune forms a vast plain open to the west and the relief is focused on the east. There are significant woods covering the north and south-east of the commune which are part of the Double saintongeaise. The highest point in the commune is at an altitude of 148 m located south-east of Pilledoux. The lowest point is 51 m located along the Pharaoh river on the western boundary. The village of Baignes is 75 m above sea level.

=== Hydrography ===
The Pharaon, a tributary of the Seugne which passes through Jonzac and is a sub-tributary of the Charente crosses the commune from east to west passing through the town. It forms the municipal boundary to the east with Touvérac and it is called the Ruisseau de la Grolle upstream. It rises at the foot of the highest point of the town in a small lake.

To the south-west of this same point is the Mathelon, another small indirect tributary of the Seugne (through the Lariat which flows through Bran), rises and flows west.

The northern border of the commune is formed by the Ruisseau de la Tâtre and, for some distance, by the Étang de Saint-Maigrin. The Tâtre is a tributary of the Trèfle, which is itself a tributary of the Seugne.

The commune is also dotted with many small lakes and reservoirs in the south and some sources in the north (Font du Bouille, Font du Quart).

=== Climate ===
The climate is oceanic Aquitaine and similar to the town of Cognac (40 km north) where the departmental weather station is located.

Comparison of local Meteorological data with other cities in France
Town	Sunshine (hours/yr)	Rain (mm/yr)	Snow (days/yr)	Storm (days/yr)	Fog (days/yr)
National average	1,973	770	14	22	40
Baignes-Sainte-Radegonde	2,027	763	3	23	54
Paris	1,661	637	12	18	10
Nice	2,724	767	1	29	1
Strasbourg	1,693	665	29	29	56
Brest	1,605	1,211	7	12	75

Climate data for Cognac
Month	Jan	Feb	Mar	Apr	May	Jun	Jul	Aug	Sep	Oct	Nov	Dec	Year
Mean daily maximum °C (°F)	9.4 (48.9)	11.0 (51.8)	14.4 (57.9)	16.9 (62.4)	20.8 (69.4)	24.3 (75.7)	26.8 (80.2)	26.7 (80.1)	23.5 (74.3)	19.0 (66.2)	13.0 (55.4)	9.8 (49.6)	18.0 (64.4)
Daily mean °C (°F)	6.1 (43.0)	6.9 (44.4)	9.7 (49.5)	11.9 (53.4)	15.8 (60.4)	19.0 (66.2)	21.1 (70.0)	20.9 (69.6)	17.9 (64.2)	14.4 (57.9)	9.3 (48.7)	6.6 (43.9)	13.3 (55.9)
Mean daily minimum °C (°F)	2.8 (37.0)	2.8 (37.0)	4.9 (40.8)	6.9 (44.4)	10.6 (51.1)	13.6 (56.5)	15.3 (59.5)	15.0 (59.0)	12.3 (54.1)	9.9 (49.8)	5.6 (42.1)	3.3 (37.9)	8.6 (47.5)
Average precipitation mm (inches)	70.5 (2.78)	51.4 (2.02)	57.2 (2.25)	69.6 (2.74)	63.8 (2.51)	50.6 (1.99)	47.4 (1.87)	45.3 (1.78)	59.3 (2.33)	79.5 (3.13)	85.1 (3.35)	83.1 (3.27)	762.8 (30.03)
Average precipitation days (≥ 1 mm)	11.6	9.2	10.1	11.2	10.5	7.4	6.9	6.5	8.0	11.2	11.5	11.6	115.7
Mean monthly sunshine hours	77.3	111.1	160.2	179.3	211.4	351.4	254.6	239.4	219.3	141.6	91.4	89.6	2,026.6
Source: Meteorological data for Cognac - 59m altitude, from 1981 to 2010 January 2015 (in French)

== Toponymy ==
Old forms of the name are: Cathmeriacum, a name possibly of Celtic origin, (Note: See Champniers, Catmerio in 1110.) before the 8th century when the abbey was founded which the monks named Beania (feminine singular). This name is found in 1068 and later then Sancta Radegundis.

Beanus in Low Latin means student newly arrived at the Academy or yellow beak but, according to Dauzat, Beania could be a popular distortion of Bethania, a locality often mentioned in the Gospels.

== History ==
In Roman times Baignes-Sainte-Radegonde was called Cathmeriacum and the Pharaon river was called Cavallo.

According to popular tradition the Abbey of Saint-Étienne of Baignes was built in the time of Charlemagne to the south of the town. In principle this abbey depended on the Order of Saint Benedict but Ramnulphe (Ramnulfus Focaudi), Bishop of Saintes between 1083 and 1106, entrusted it to the direction of Hugh, the Abbot of Cluny. Pierre II de Soubise, his successor at the Holy Bishopric (1107-1112), confirmed this assignment to the Abbot Pontius according to a chart kept in the archives of Cluny.

In the 9th century Baignes was a viguerie which later became the Barony of Montausier. The Chateau of Montausier was a short distance from the town to the north. The only remains are an old tower and a fountain called Font de Madame of which the arch can be seen.

In the Middle Ages the monks of the abbey named the town Beania which included the abbey village and Montausier town.

The barony of Montausier with that of the neighbouring Chaux formed the enclave of Petit Angoumois (Little Angoumois), which relied on the Présidial of Angoulême for justice and the steward of the Généralité of Limoges for administration. The territory consisted of a dozen parishes including seven which were, in whole or in part, in the department of Charente: Sainte-Radegund with Mathelon, Chantillac, Le Tâtre, Touvérac, Bors with Venet, part of Boisbreteau with Peirrefont. All the surrounding country was Saintonge, election Barbezieux. The parish of Baignes itself was saintongeaise and of this election. It was from these that the Baronies of Montausier and Chaux were detached in the Middle Ages from the County of Angoulême.

In principle the Barony of Montausier belonged to the Counts and Dukes of Angoulême but in 1031 Count Geoffroi Taillefer detached it from the County and gave it to his son Arnaud. The descendants of Arnaud Taillefer retained the land of Montausier for a long time before passing it to the Sainte-Maure family.

A notable member of this family was Charles de Sainte-Maure, Duke of Montausier who was tutor to the Dauphin, son of Louis XIV, and in whose favour this prince elevated the Barony of Montausier to a duchy-peerage in 1665. Charles de Montausier became a model for Molière for his character of Alceste in the comedy The Misanthrope.

Charles was succeeded by his only daughter, Julie Marie de Montausier who married Emmanuel II de Crussol, Duke of Uzès, Governor of Saintonge and Angoumois. This branch of Crussol owned Montausier until the Revolution without ever having lived there. The land was then confiscated due to emigration and the castle was destroyed in 1793.

During the French Revolution Sainte-Radegund commune was provisionally called Pharon, then Radegonde-la-Plaine.

In the 1870s Father Jean-Hippolyte Michon, author of the Monumental Statistics of Charente, built an elaborate mansion on the site of the ancient Chateau of Montausier.

At the beginning of the 19th century the main economic activity of Baignes was raising cattle and pigs. Almost all workers were textile workers who produced canvas which was sold in the Bordeaux markets. There were also several Tanners and Dressers who prepared tanned and white leather.

In 1855 Sainte-Radegund merged with Baignes to form Baignes-Sainte-Radegonde.

In 1893 the first dairy cooperative in Charente was started in Baignes. The designation Beurre de Baignes (Baignes Butter) is still famous.

=== Heraldry ===
Arms of Baignes-Sainte-Radegonde	Blazon: Lozengy of Or and Azure.

== Administration ==
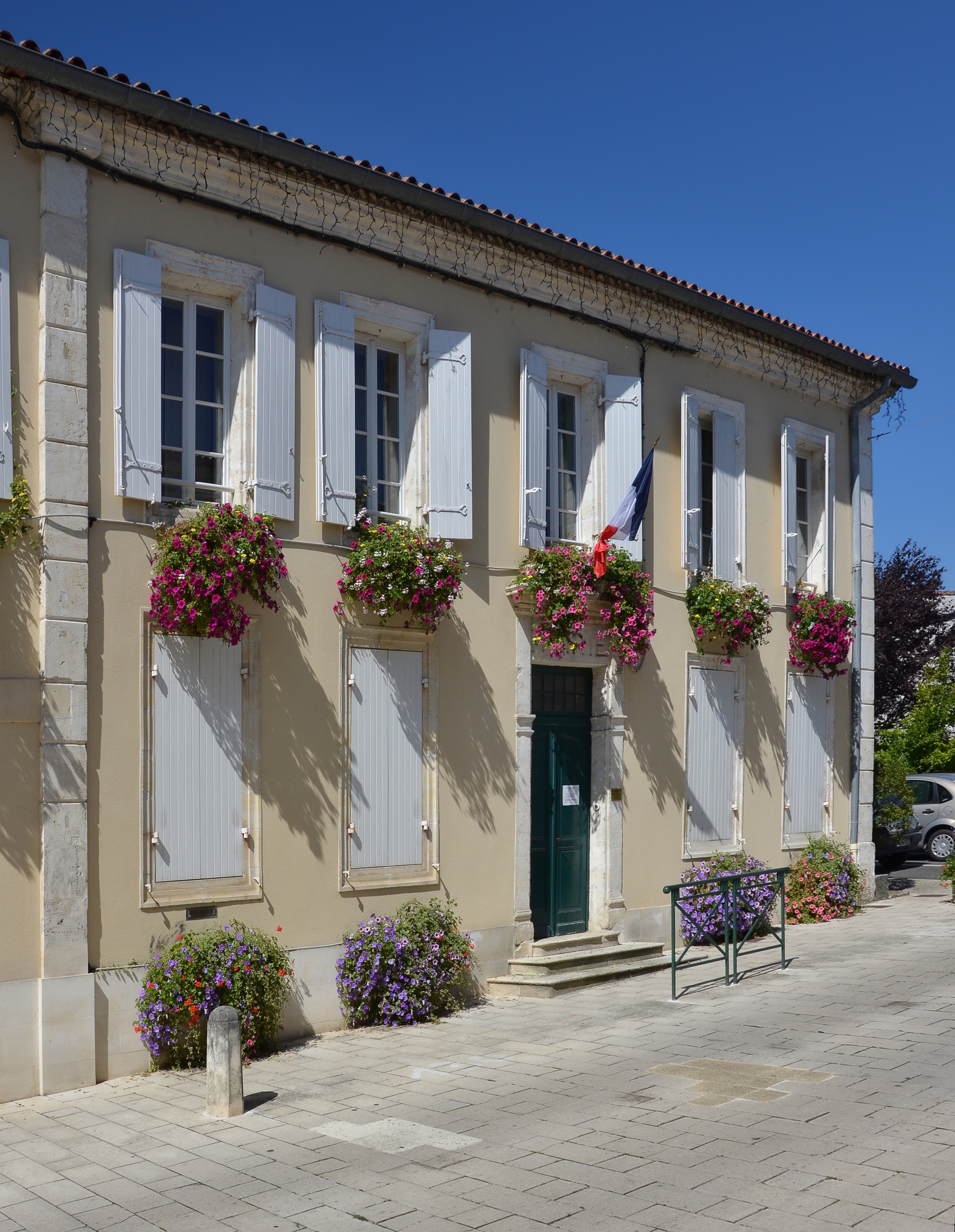
The Town Hall

List of Successive Mayors

From	To	Name	Party
1971	1995	Pierre-Rémy Houssin	RPR
1995	2013	Pierre Jaulin	UMP
2013	2020	Gérard Deletoile	DVD
2020	2026	Michel Dubojski	

=== Twinning ===
Baignes-Sainte-Radegonde has twinning associations with:

- Dietramszell (Germany) since 1984.

== Demography ==
The inhabitants of the commune are known as Baignois or Baignoises in French. N.B. Prior to 1856 the figures include both the communes of Baignes and Sainte-Radegonde.

Historical population

Year	Pop.	±% p.a.
1793	2,422	—
1800	1,794	−4.20%
1806	2,449	+5.32%
1821	2,479	+0.08%
1831	2,323	−0.65%
1841	2,294	−0.13%
1846	2,471	+1.50%
1851	2,502	+0.25%
1856	2,541	+0.31%
1861	2,631	+0.70%
1866	2,417	−1.68%
1872	2,266	−1.07%
1876	2,227	−0.43%
1881	2,215	−0.11%
1886	2,122	−0.85%
1891	2,002	−1.16%
1896	1,899	−1.05%
1901	1,886	−0.14%

Year	Pop.	±% p.a.
1906	1,968	+0.85%
1911	1,811	−1.65%
1921	1,693	−0.67%
1926	1,607	−1.04%
1931	1,503	−1.33%
1936	1,545	+0.55%
1946	1,450	−0.63%
1954	1,382	−0.60%
1962	1,416	+0.30%
1968	1,462	+0.53%
1975	1,452	−0.10%
1982	1,427	−0.25%
1990	1,191	−2.23%
1999	1,239	+0.44%
2007	1,282	+0.43%
2012	1,303	+0.33%
2017	1,257	−0.72%
2023	1,254	−0.04%

Source: EHESS and INSEE

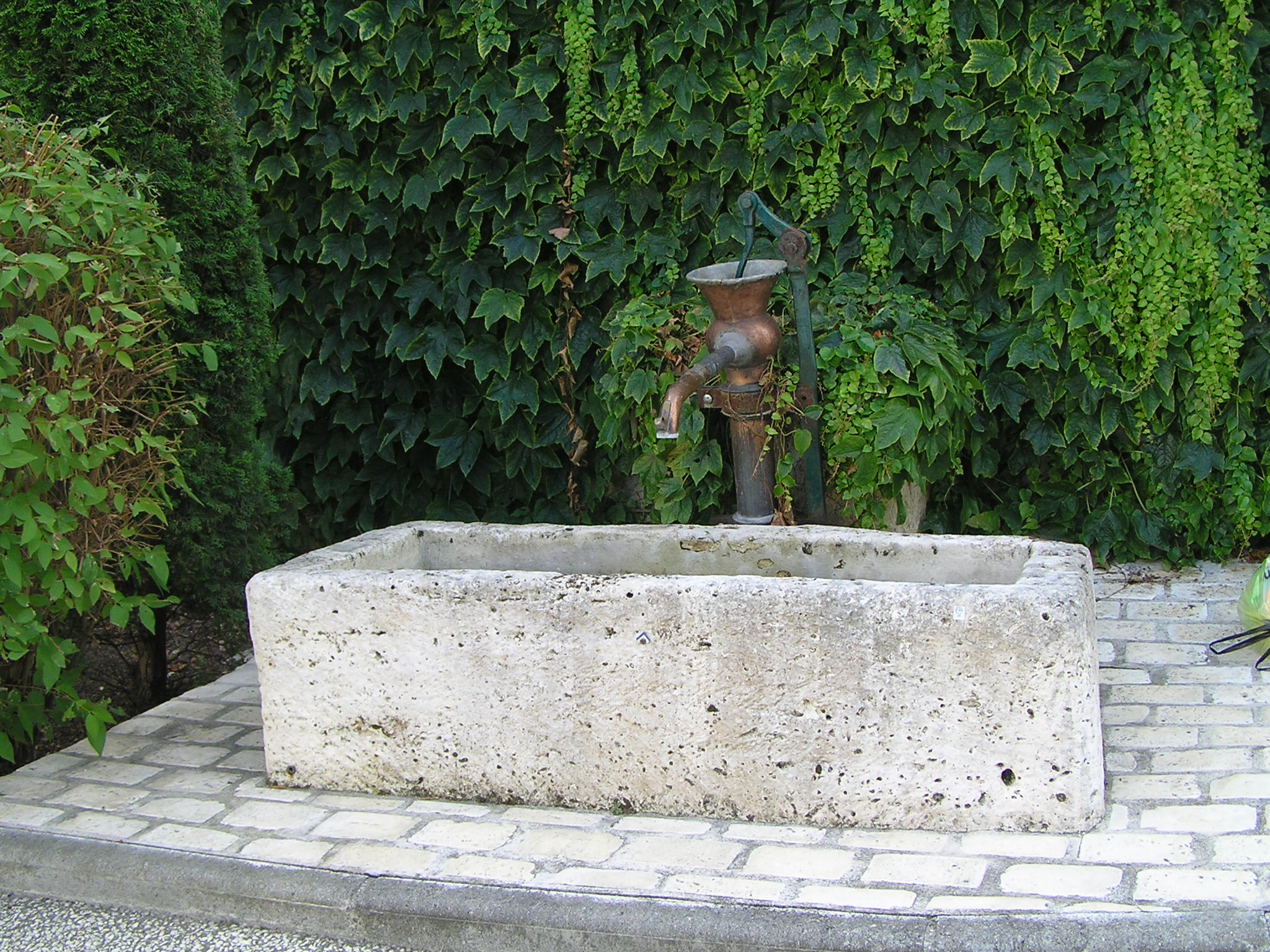
An old water trough

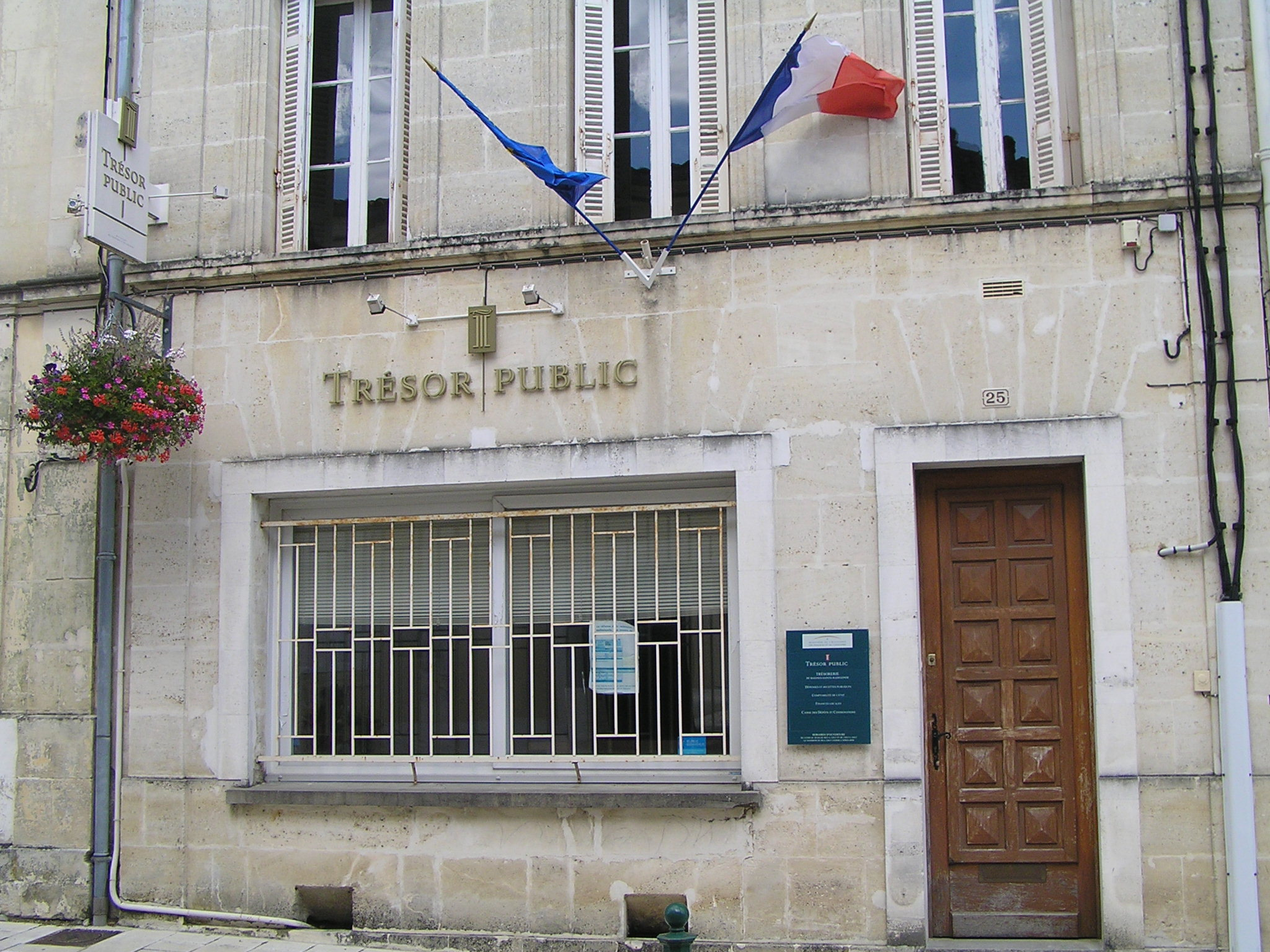
The Tax Office

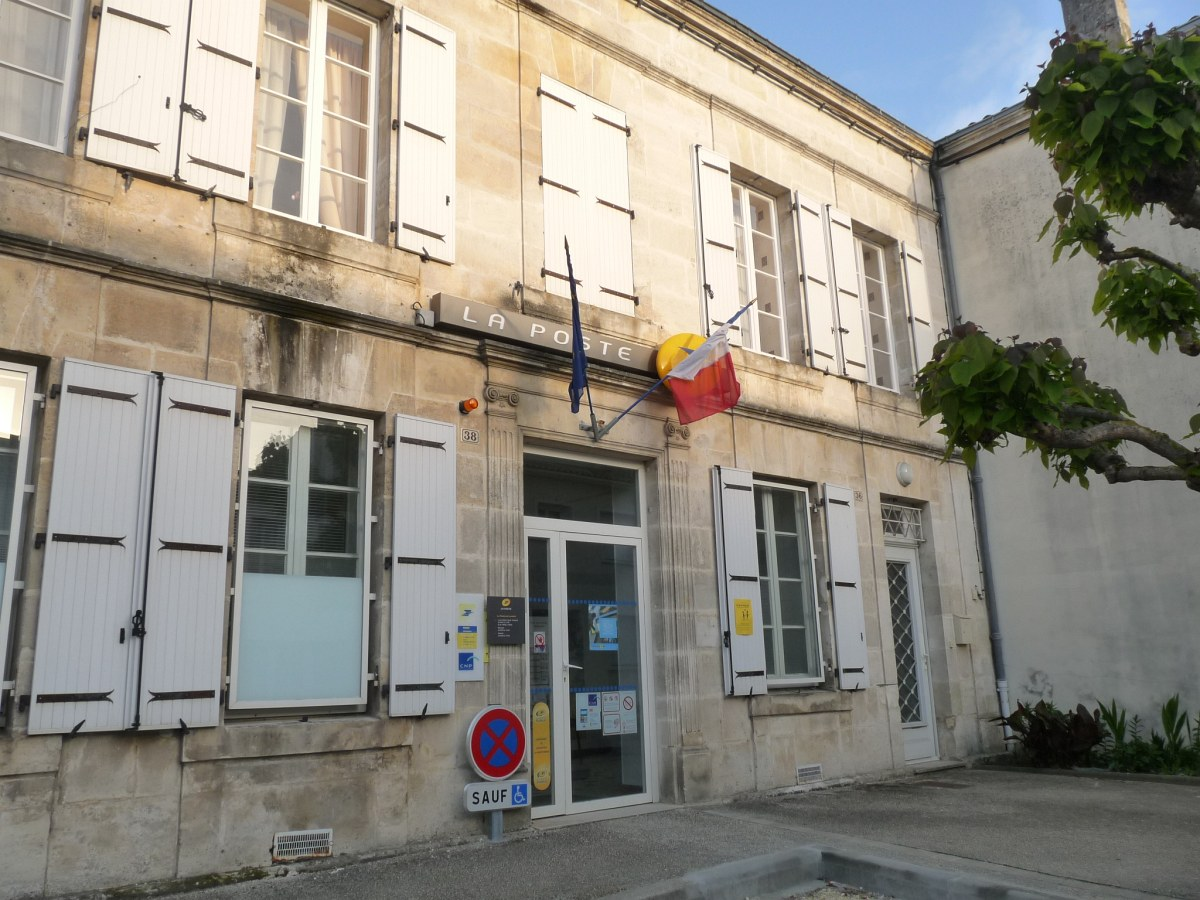
The Post Office

== Facilities ==
=== Education ===
- The André Malraux College caters for students from 6th to 3rd levels. In 2011 there were 143 students in eight classes.
- An Elementary school with five classes
- A Kindergarten

=== Other facilities and services ===
As capital of the Canton, Baignes has a police station, a first aid station, and a post office.

== Culture and heritage ==
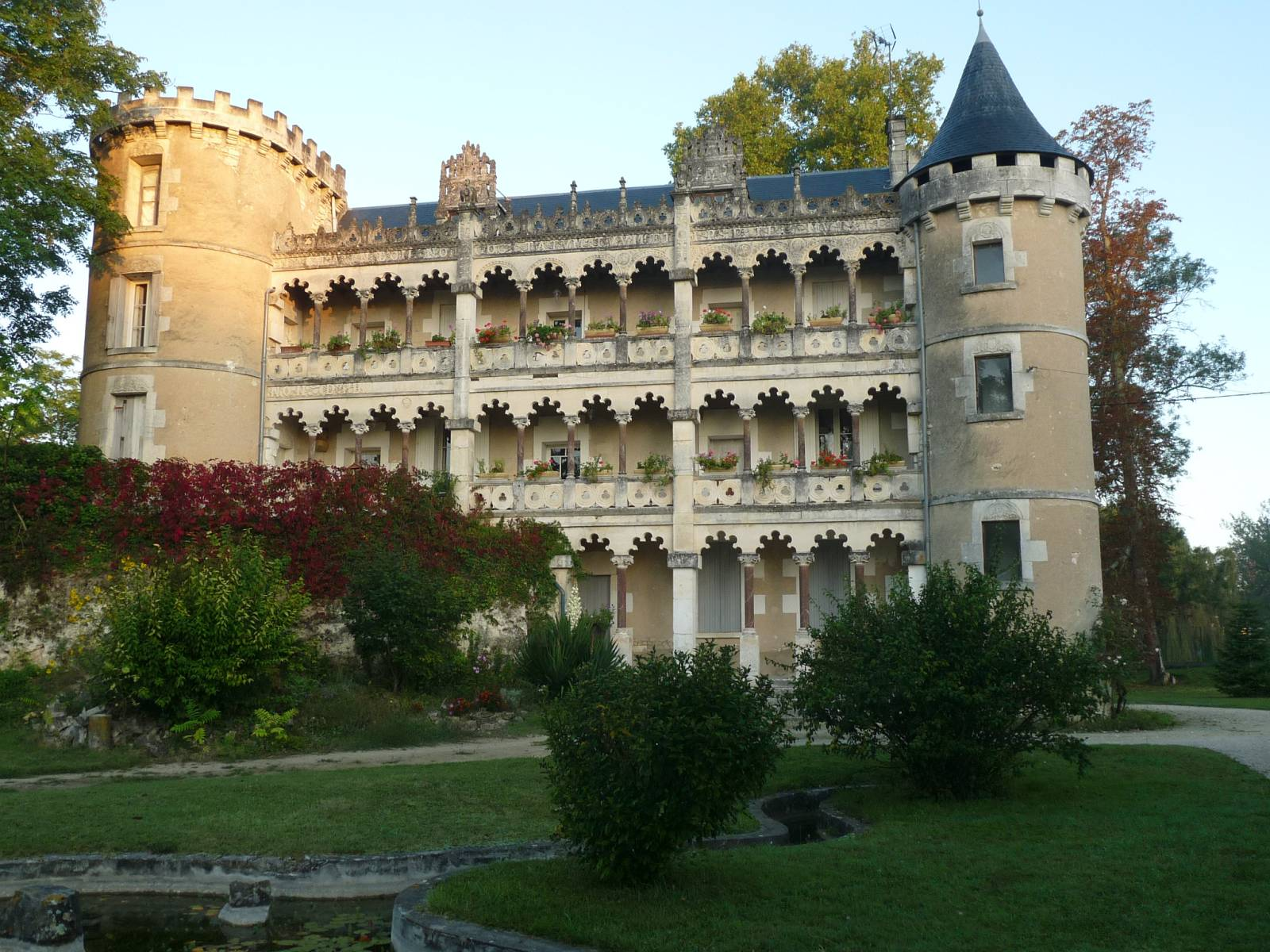
The Chateau of Abbot Michon

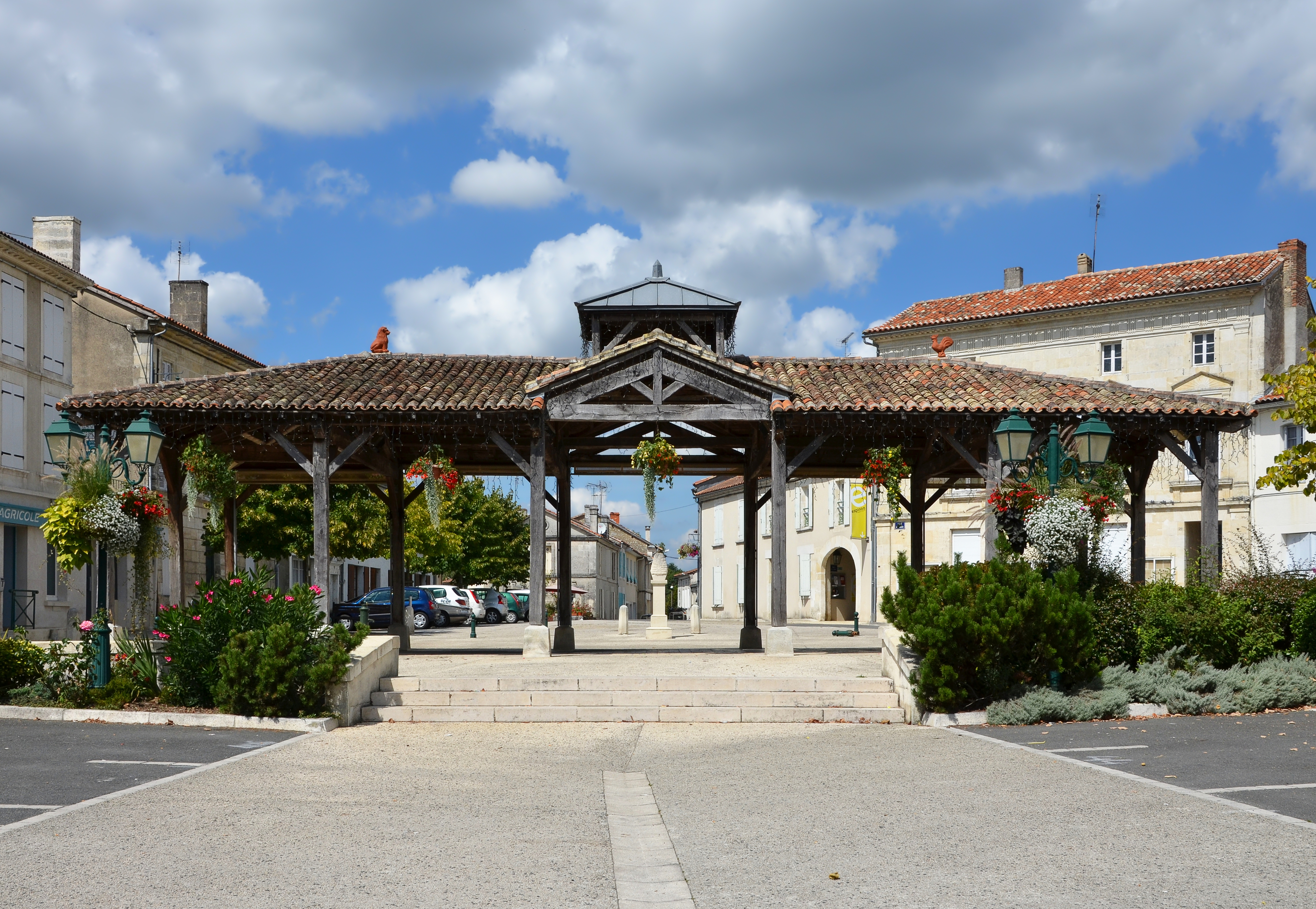
The Covered Market

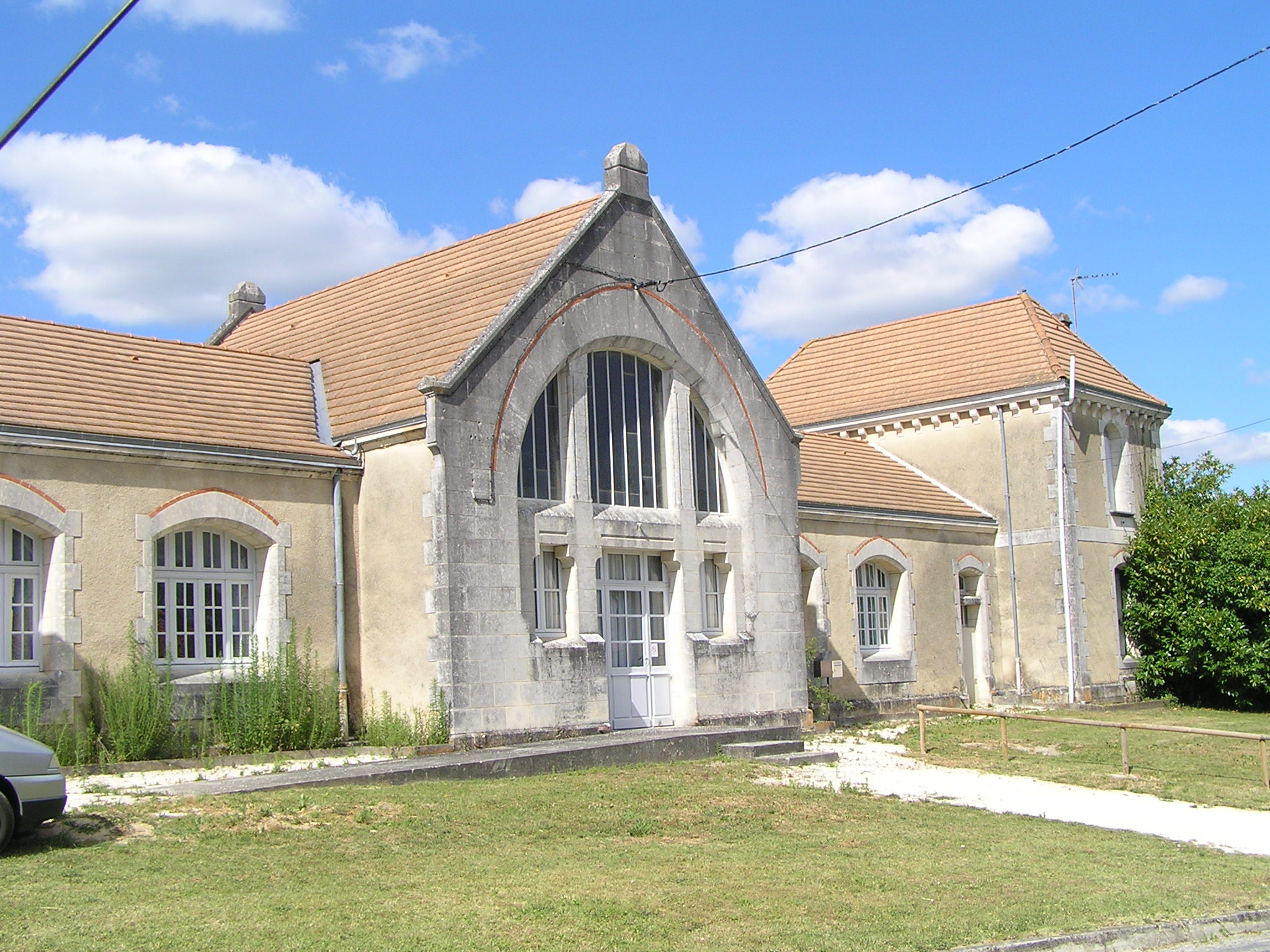
The old School at Sainte-Radegonde

=== Civil heritage ===
The commune has many buildings and sites that are registered as historical monuments:

- Windmills (18th-19th century)
- A Chateau on D100 (1879) by Abbé Michon, archaeologist and graphologist.
- The tower of the Chateau de Montausier on D100 (15th century)
- A House at Rue du Champ de Foire (18th century)
- A Trade Shop at Rue du Champ de Foire (19th century)
- The War Memorial at Place de l'Eglise (20th century)
- The School on Grand Rue (1911)
- Farmhouses (18th century)
- A Mansion at Gadebor (15th century)
- A Covered Market (destroyed)
- Houses and Farms (18th-19th century)

=== Religious heritage ===
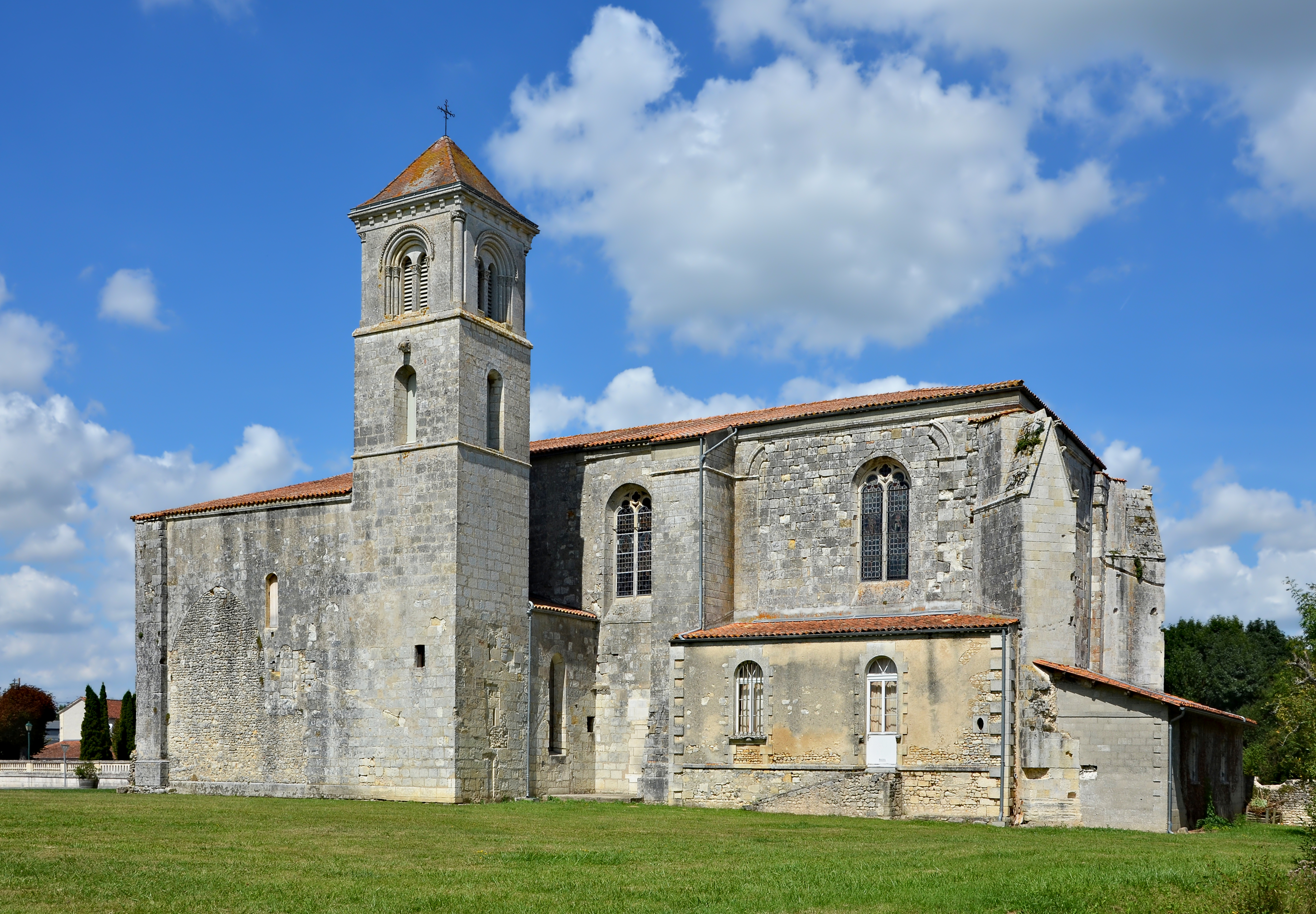
Benedictine Abbey of Saint Etienne

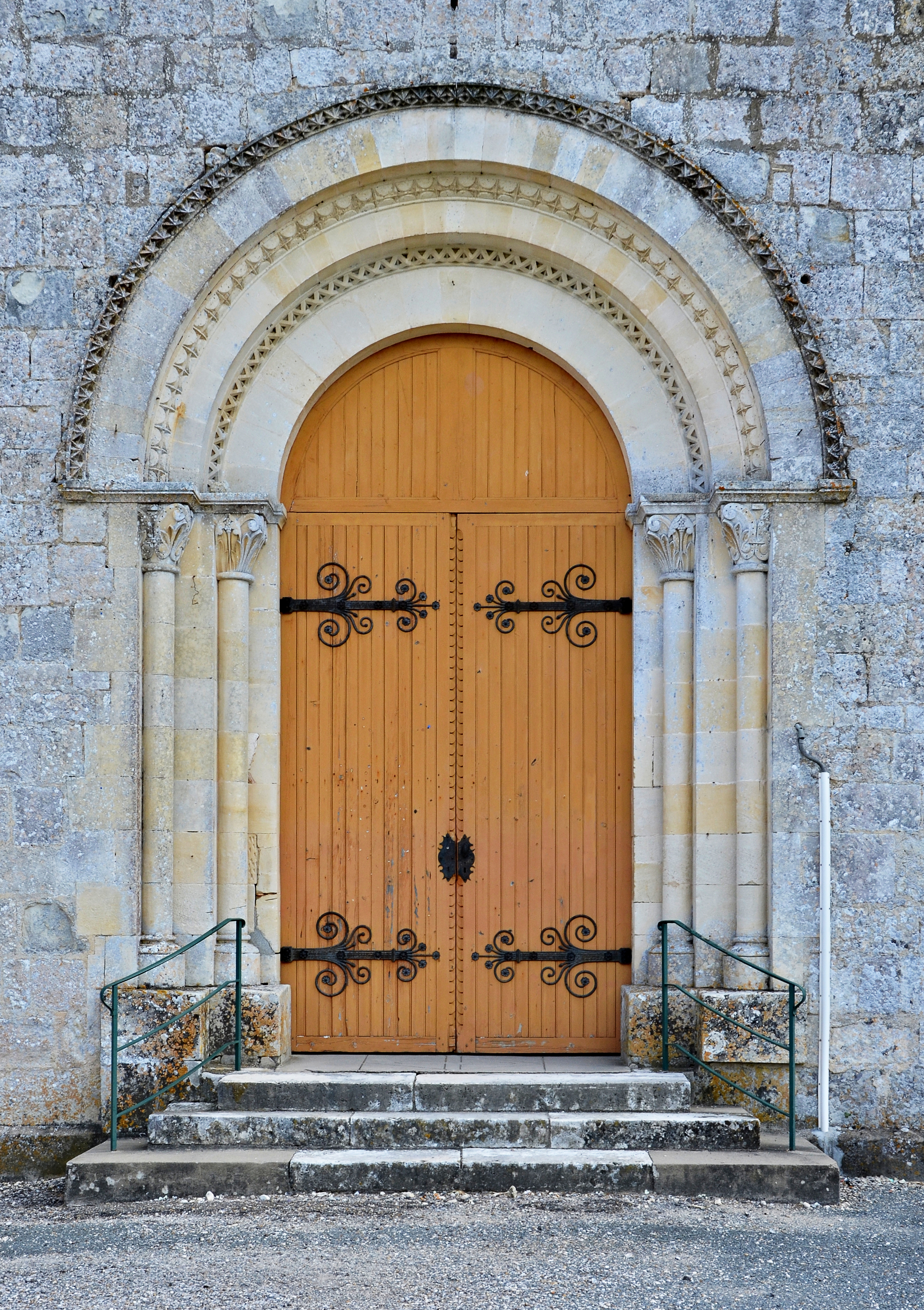
Entrance to the Abbey

The commune has several religious buildings and structures that are registered as historical monuments:

- A Cemetery Cross on D132 (19th century)
- A Wayside Cross at D14/D132 (20th century)
- The Benedictine Abbey of Saint Etienne (11th century). The Abbey has a large number of items that are registered as historical objects.
- The Saint Jacques Benedictine Priory (destroyed)
- A Presbytery at Sainte-Radegonde (1879)
- A Protestant Church (19th century)
- The Saint Radegonde Benedictine Priory (12th century). The columns of the north wall are Romanesque while those of the south wall are clearly Gothic and date from the 13th century. The tower gate was built in the 19th century and replaced a simple pediment bell tower which had two bells. There is a remnant of an arch and the start of some vaults from the 13th century. Inside the church there is a stained glass window representing Saint Radegund, wife of Chlothar I. The priory contains many items that are registered as historical objects:
  - The Furniture in the Priory
  - 2 Bronze Bells (1877)
  - A Bronze Bell (1554)
  - A Flower Vase (19th century)
  - Patens (19th century)
  - A Chalice (19th century)
  - A Tabernacle Veil
  - A Pulpit (19th century)
  - A Secondary Altar and Tabernacle (19th century)
  - The main Altar and Tabernacle (19th century)
  - A Stained glass window: Saint Radegund (20th century)

== Notable people linked to the commune ==
- Jean-Hippolyte Michon, born in Corrèze in 1806. He moved with his family to Charente and lived there for many years. He was a universal man: writer, journalist, and archaeologist. He built a mansion on the ancient ruins of the Chateau of Montausier. He himself was the designer and the inventor of the house with the help of workers of the trade. It was inspired by travels in the East to define an architecture that borrows from the medieval Machicolations and battlements and Oriental art for the arches. Founder of graphology, studied handwritten manuscripts to reveal the personality of the authors. In 1878 he published "The practical method of handwriting."
- Charles de Sainte-Maure, Duke of Montausier, tutor to the Dauphin, son of Louis XIV and in whose favour the prince elevated the Barony of Montausier to a duchy-peerage in 1665.
- Baptiste Roussy (1856-1926). Born in Le Tâtre, Mayor of Baignes, professor at the École pratique des hautes études and the Collège de France, author of Home Education for Women and Social Renovation which covered demographics, birth rate, and mortality, and the author of numerous works.
- Alfred Séguin, (1825–1900?) born in Baignes-Sainte-Radegonde, novelist and playwright.

== See also ==
- Communes of the Charente department
