= Bran, Charente-Maritime =

Bran
- Commune
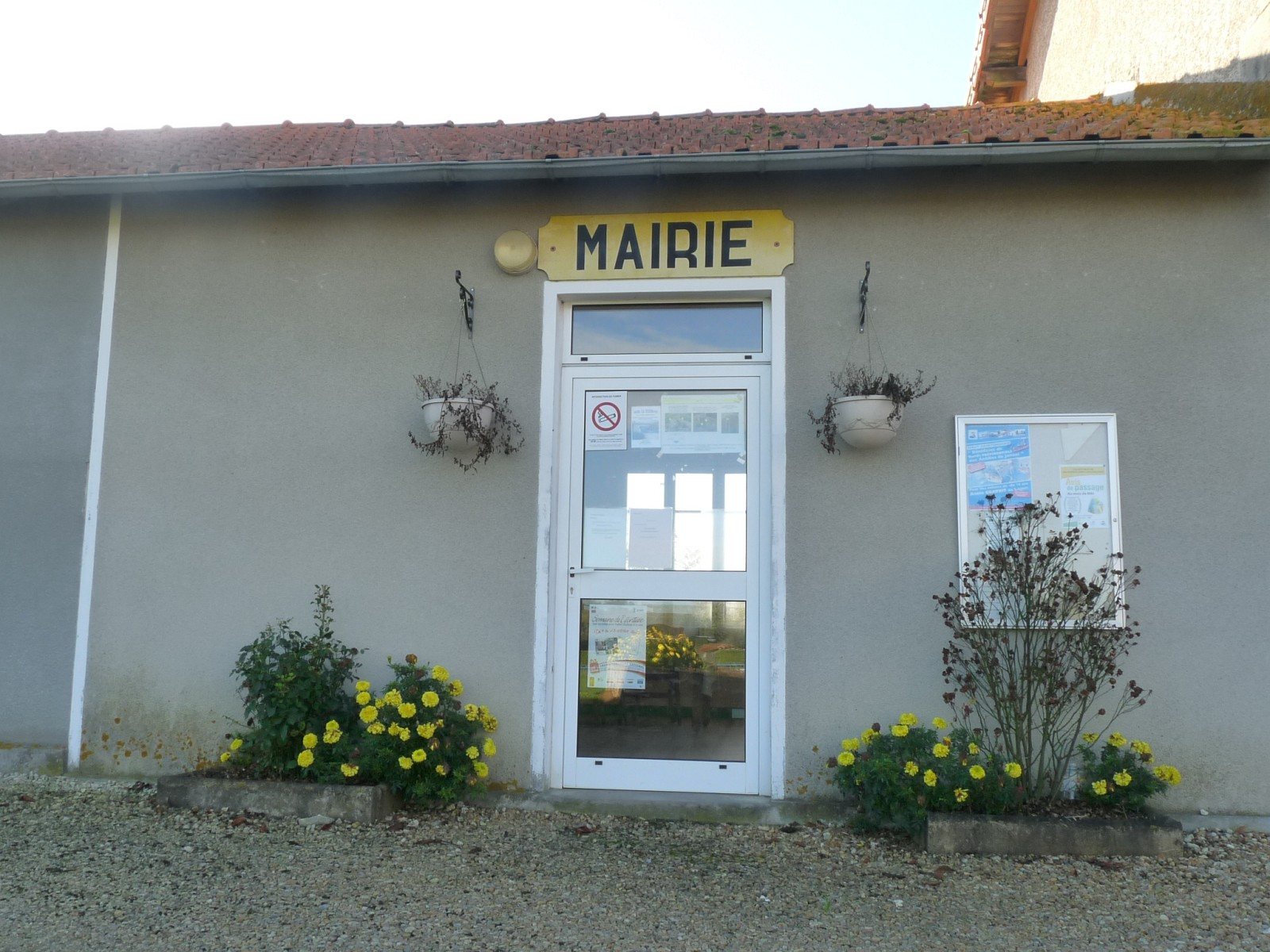
- The town hall in Bran
- Location of Bran
- Location within France Location within Nouvelle-Aquitaine
- Coordinates: 45°21′00″N 0°15′44″W
- Country: France
- Region: Nouvelle-Aquitaine
- Department: Charente-Maritime
- Arrondissement: Jonzac
- Canton: Les Trois Monts
- Intercommunality: Haute-Saintonge

Government
  - Mayor (2020–2026): Jean-Francois Perrier
- Area^{1}: 4.14 km^{2} (1.60 sq mi)
- Elevation: 71 m (233 ft)
- Highest elevation: 101 m (331 ft)
- Lowest elevation: 62 m (203 ft)
- Population (2023): 137
  - Density: 33.1/km^{2} (85.7/sq mi)
- Time zone: UTC+01:00 (CET)
  - Summer (DST): UTC+02:00 (CEST)
- INSEE/Postal code: 17061 /17210
- ^{1} French Land Register data, which excludes lakes, ponds, glaciers > 1 km^{2} (0.386 sq mi or 247 acres) and river estuaries.

Bran (French pronunciation: [bʁɑ̃]) is a small commune in southwestern France situated in the department of Charente-Maritime.

The inhabitants of Bran are known as les Brannais and les Brannaises.

== Geography ==
=== Lieux-dits ===
Traditional named-places within the commune.

Le Bourg, Chez Cottereau, Le Foucaud, Le Vignac, Les Bardes, Les Rouyers, Meslard, Pied Sec, Chez Bruneau, Chez Rouffaud, La Croix Breau, Chez Marpeau, Chez Désiré, Le Moulin Blanc, Le Fief des Sables, Le Morillon, Taillefer, Le Pas de Bran, Chez Bégaud, La Maison d'école.

=== Neighbouring communes ===
- Baignes-Sainte-Radegonde (Charente) to the north
- Vanzac to the west
- Chantillac (Charente) to the south

=== Geology and relief ===
The commune is located in the Campanian, chalky limestone of the Upper Cretaceous which occupies a large southern part of the Charentes. A small eastern part is occupied by a terrain consisting of kaolinic sand, clays and pebbles dating from the Tertiary. These soils are often forested with maritime pines and constitute the northwestern edge of the Double saintongeaise.

Two small streams, the Lariat and the Mathelon, cross the commune and are indirect tributaries of the river Seugne.

== History ==
The region has been occupied since prehistoric times; cut flints have been found in several parts of the commune. Many circular ditches remain from Protohistory (Bronze or Iron Age), identified by aerial surveys at Pérat, Moulin Blanc and Foucaud.

The Gallo-Roman period is marked by a Roman road from Saintes to Coutras at a place called Le Pérat. This Roman road passed near the Gallo-Roman villa of Baignes-Saintes-Radegonde at a place called the Petit Moulin (Gadebors), via the Gallo-Roman agglomeration of the plain of Bourelles to the west of the village of Chantillac. This route took the small Roman bridge with a ford located in the town of Polignac to then join the old road called "Charlemagne" before the town of Montguyon.

During the Hundred Years' War many underground passages were dug as refuges and to store food, they can still be found at Le Morillon, at Les Rouyers and Chez Bégaud. After the wars the landowners divided up their properties and installed managers who gave their names to many of the existing lieux-dits.

== Administration ==
=== List of mayors ===
Mayor	From	To
Roger Motard	1953	1983
Omer Hélis	1983	2001
Jean-François Perrier	2001	-

== Population ==
Historical population
Year	Pop.	±% p.a.
1968	196	—
1975	157	−3.12%
1982	135	−2.13%
1990	132	−0.28%
1999	129	−0.26%
2007	122	−0.69%
2012	124	+0.33%
2017	130	+0.95%
2023	137	+0.88%
Source: INSEE

== Places of interest ==
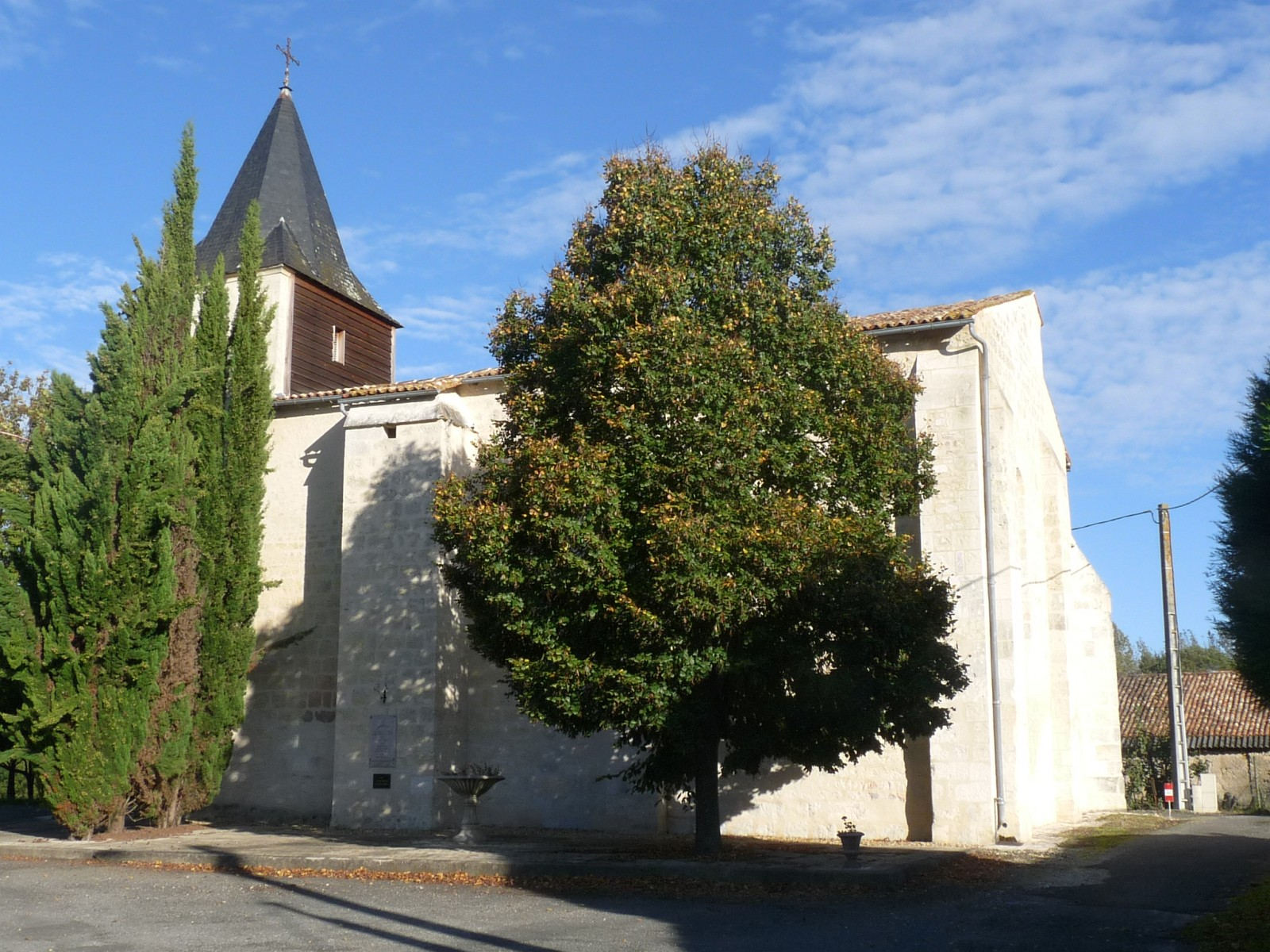
St Andrews Church

=== L'église Saint-André (St Andrew's Church) ===
The 12th-century parish church of St. Andrew was rebuilt in the 14th and 15th centuries, and was almost completely destroyed during the French wars of religion. Its nave was enlarged in the 15th century and its bell tower was rebuilt in the 19th century. There is an 18th-century limestone pulpit against the south wall of the church.

A major restoration of the church was undertaken from 2009 to 2011 followed by inauguration on 14 January 2012. During the restoration several works were undertaken: repair of floors, interior and exterior coatings, opening of an obstructed mullion window, stained glass installation, clearing of the crypt with access grid, installation of lighting and an electric heating system. A large tableau above the altar, which had been covered with black paint, was cleaned, revealing an 18th-century painting of the crucifixion.

Improvements to the area surrounding the church were carried out in 2016.

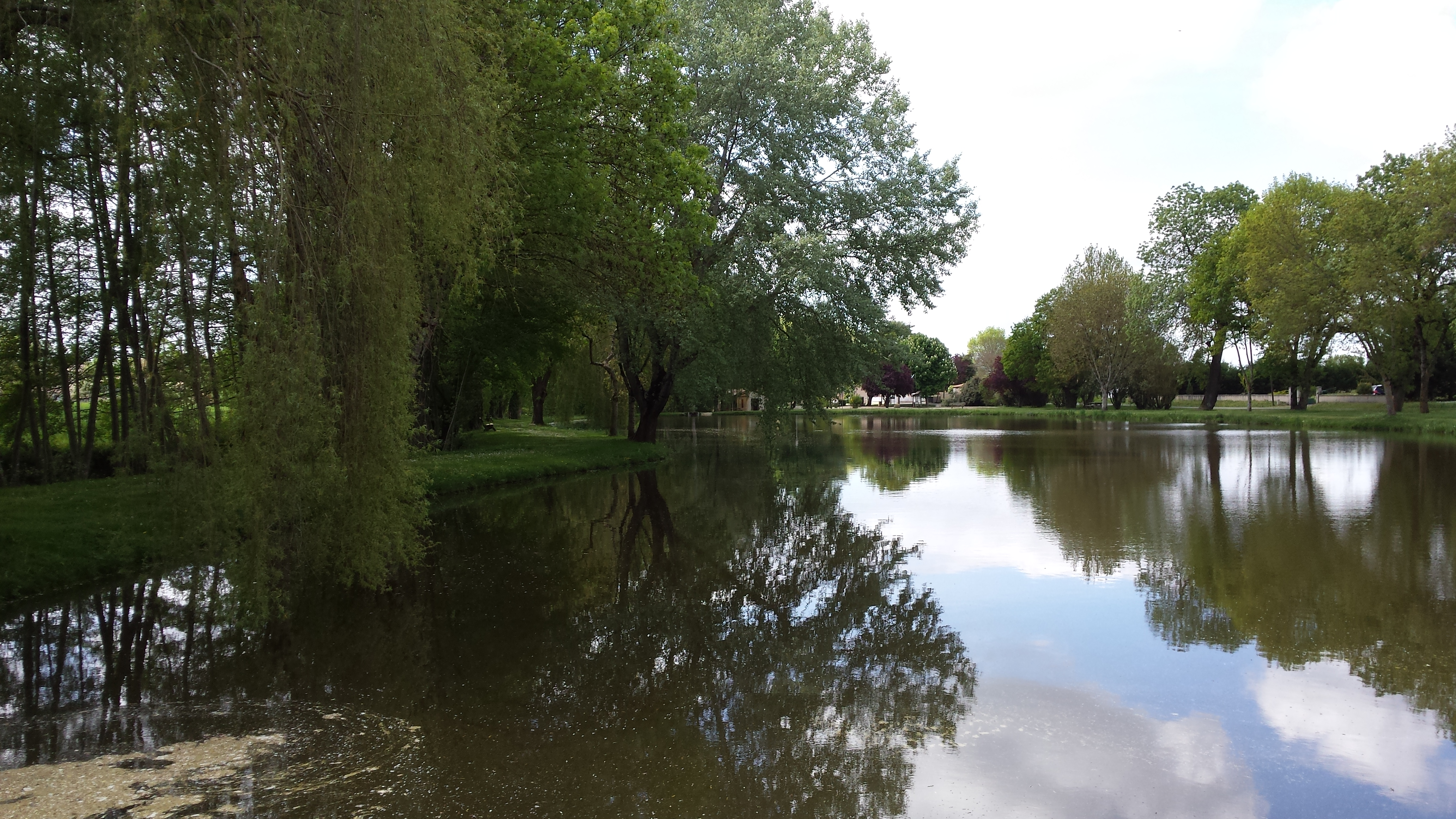
Lake and leisure area at Les Trois Moulins

=== Recreation area ===
The recreation area is located adjacent to a lake at Les Trois Moulins and is equipped with a covered pavilion with barbecue, a picnic area with tables and seats, children's games and a petanque area. An annual festival is held in the recreation area in August.

The lake is used for regular fishing events.

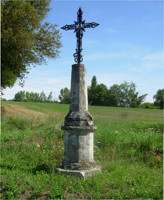
Cross of St Barbara

=== La Croix Sainte Barbe (St Barbara's Cross) ===
Located at the intersection of the hamlets of Rouffaud and Fiefs des Sables. In the center of the crossroads there was a chapel dedicated to Saint Barbara, virgin of the fourth century, patron saint of Bran. It gave rise to numerous pilgrimages on Whit Monday, in which several communes participated: Chepniers, Baignes, Pouillac, Châtenet, Vanzac, Chantillac, Messac ....

Tradition notes that many miracles happened there. This chapel, fallen into ruin, was destroyed in 1866.

=== Le Moulin de Pépaillé ===
Located at chez Rouffaud is the remnant of a windmill dating from 1883. It is on the highest point of the commune at 101 m above sea level.

== See also ==
- Communes of the Charente-Maritime department
