= List of The New School for Jazz and Contemporary Music alumni =

The following is a list of notable alumni of The New School for Jazz and Contemporary Music. Members of this list have attended for at least one semester and are notable in their respective field in the music industry.

* Designates did not complete degree/diploma program.

== List ==
- Thana Alexa
- Joe Ascione
- Marcus Baylor
- Kenyatta Beasley
- Miri Ben-Ari
- Peter Bernstein
- Bilal (Note: The singer and songwriter Bilal attended the school in 1999 and later enlisted several of his former classmates, including Robert Glasper, to perform on his album Love for Sale.)
- Walter Blanding, Jr.
- Andy Boehmke
- Dekel Bor
- Otis Brown III
- Avishai Cohen (bassist)
- Aaron Comess
- Adam Cruz
- Jesse Davis
- Mike Effenberger
- John Ellis
- James Francies
- Rebecca Coupe Franks
- Robert Glasper
- Larry Goldings
- Assaf Hakimi
- Roy Hargrove
- Owen Howard
- Ali Jackson
- José James
- Greg Kurstin
- Arun Luthra
- Steve Lyman
- Dave Masucci
- Wenzl McGowen
- Brad Mehldau
- Mike Moreno
- Senri Oe
- John Popper*
- Mike Rodriguez
- Jaz Sawyer
- Alex Skolnick
- Becca Stevens
- Loren Stillman
- E. J. Strickland
- Marcus Strickland
- Taali
- Yuki Tei
- Wallice*
- Michael Wilbur
- J.J. Wright
- Andrés Volkov
