= Bors, Canton of Tude-et-Lavalette =

Bors
- Commune
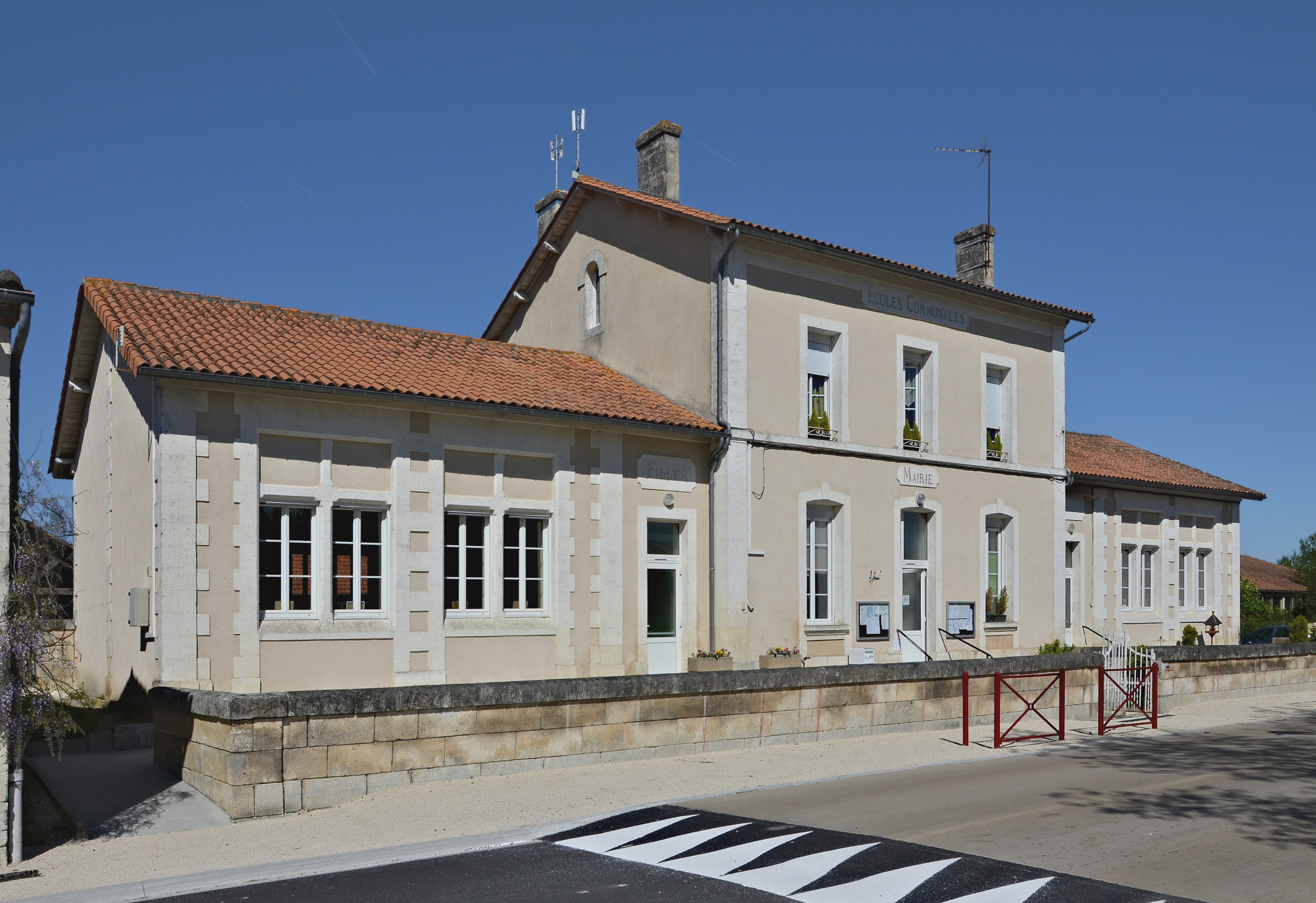
- Town hall
- Location of Bors
- Location within France Location within Nouvelle-Aquitaine
- Coordinates: 45°20′35″N 0°10′02″E
- Country: France
- Region: Nouvelle-Aquitaine
- Department: Charente
- Arrondissement: Angoulême
- Canton: Tude-et-Lavalette
- Intercommunality: Lavalette Tude Dronne

Government
  - Mayor (2020–2026): Jacky Renaudin
- Area^{1}: 16.1 km^{2} (6.2 sq mi)
- Elevation: 143 m (469 ft)
- Population (2023): 223
  - Density: 13.9/km^{2} (35.9/sq mi)
- Time zone: UTC+01:00 (CET)
  - Summer (DST): UTC+02:00 (CEST)
- INSEE/Postal code: 16052 /16190
- ^{1} French Land Register data, which excludes lakes, ponds, glaciers > 1 km^{2} (0.386 sq mi or 247 acres) and river estuaries.

Bors (also referred to as Bors-de-Montmoreau, to distinguish it from Bors near Baignes-Sainte-Radegonde) is a commune in the Charente department in southwestern France.

== Population ==
Historical population
Year	Pop.	±% p.a.
1968	404	—
1975	344	−2.27%
1982	346	+0.08%
1990	283	−2.48%
1999	270	−0.52%
2007	268	−0.09%
2012	242	−2.02%
2017	268	+2.06%
2023	223	−3.02%
Source: INSEE

== See also ==
- Communes of the Charente department
