= Bors (disambiguation) =

Bors is the name of two knights from Arthurian legend.

Bors may also refer to:

- Bors, Canton of Charente-Sud, France, a commune
- Bors, Canton of Tude-et-Lavalette, France, a commune
- Bors, Iran, a village
- Bors, the title character of Philip K. Dick's short story "The Last of the Masters"

== See also ==
- Borş (disambiguation)
