= Montmérac =

- Commune
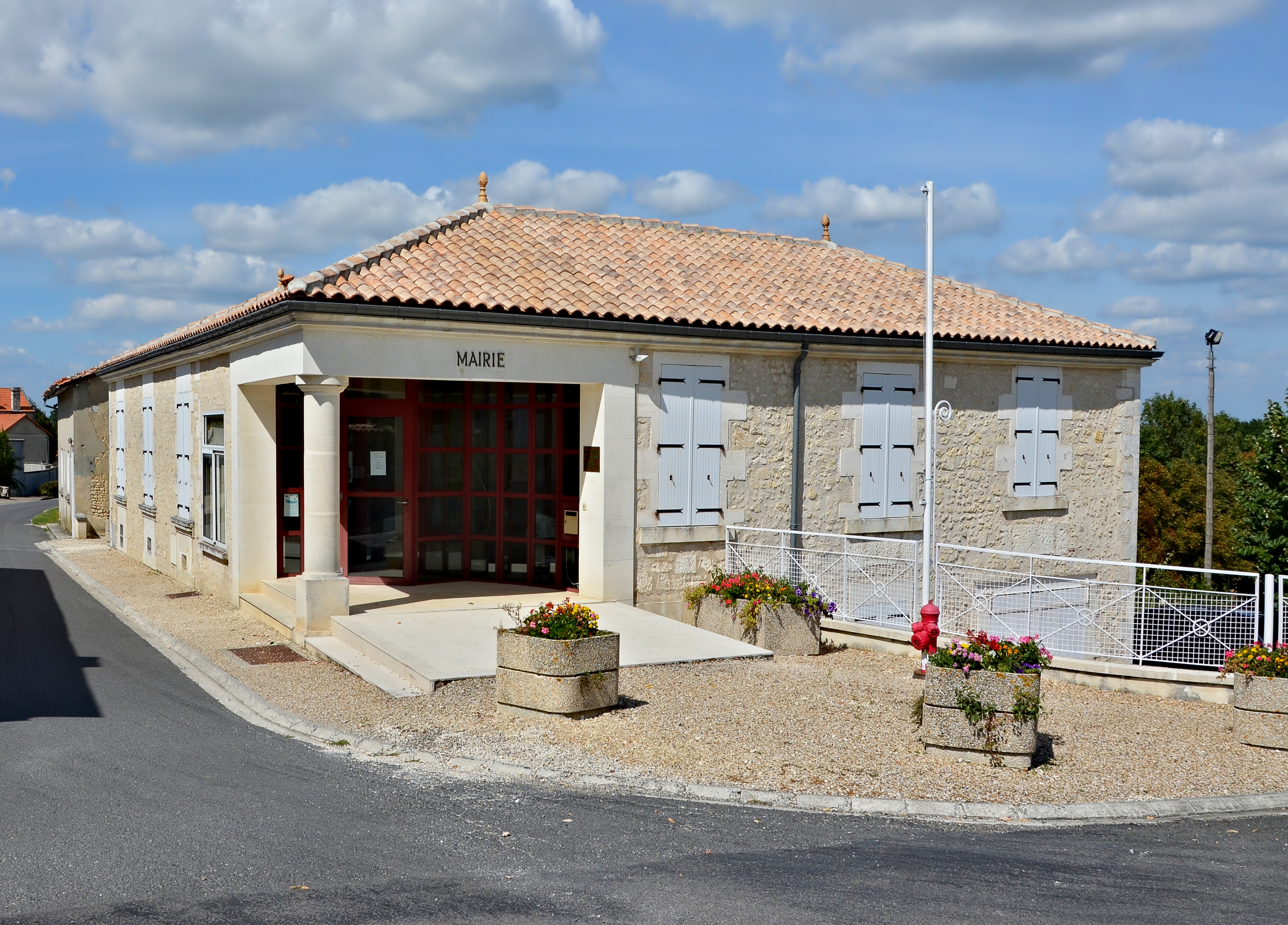
- The town hall in Montmérac

- Coat of arms
- Location of Montmérac
- Location within France Location within Nouvelle-Aquitaine
- Coordinates: 45°26′56″N 0°12′04″W
- Country: France
- Region: Nouvelle-Aquitaine
- Department: Charente
- Arrondissement: Cognac
- Canton: Charente-Sud

Government
  - Mayor (2020–2026): Frédéric Bergeon
- Area^{1}: 23.39 km^{2} (9.03 sq mi)
- Population (2023): 730
  - Density: 31/km^{2} (81/sq mi)
- Time zone: UTC+01:00 (CET)
  - Summer (DST): UTC+02:00 (CEST)
- INSEE/Postal code: 16224 /16300
- ^{1} French Land Register data, which excludes lakes, ponds, glaciers > 1 km^{2} (0.386 sq mi or 247 acres) and river estuaries.

Montmérac (French pronunciation: [mɔ̃meʁak]) is a commune in the Charente department of southwestern France. The municipality was established on 1 January 2016 and consists of the former communes of Montchaude and Lamérac.

== See also ==
- Communes of the Charente department
