= Montchaude =

- Part of Montmérac
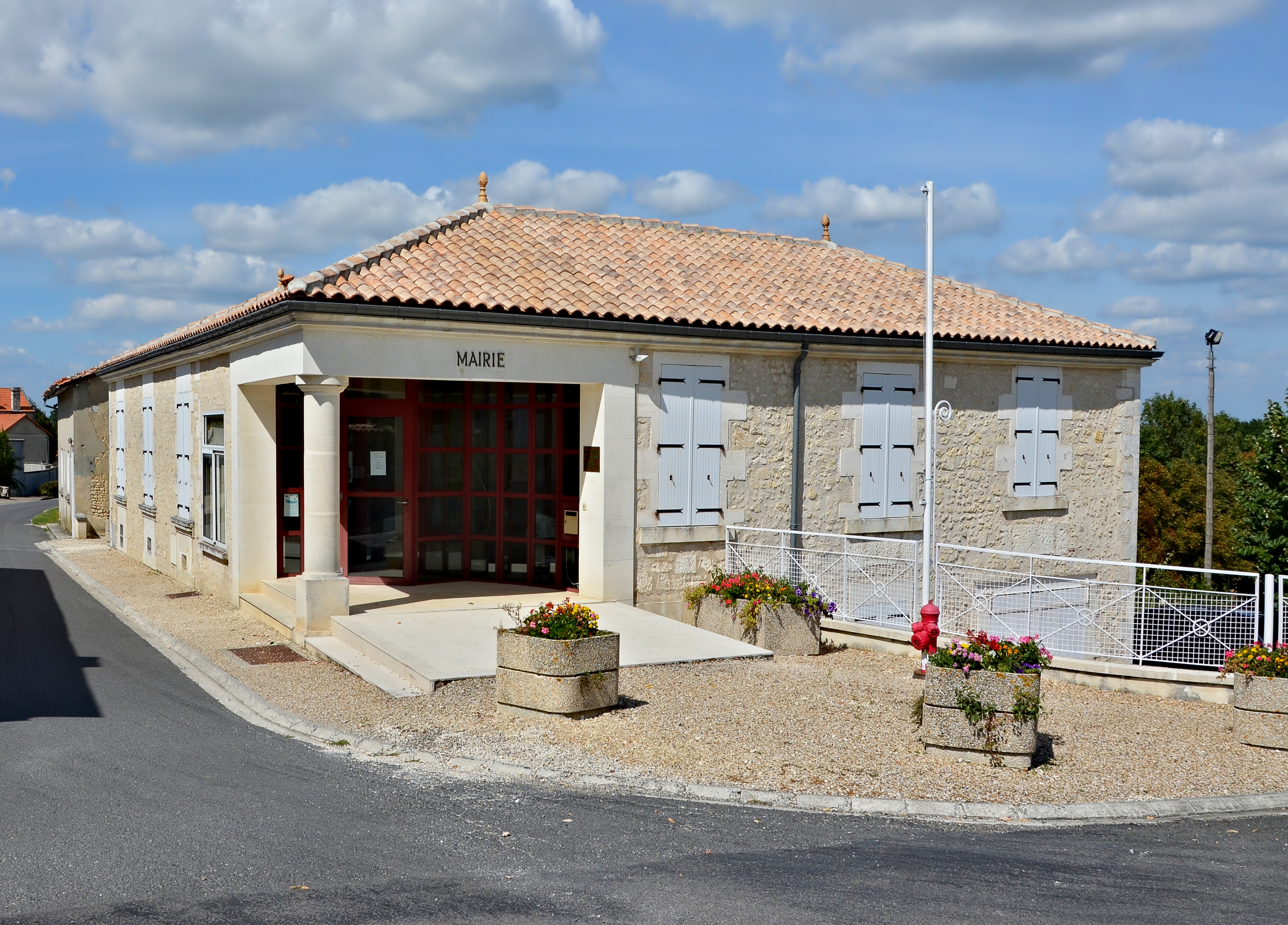
- Town hall
- Location of Montchaude
- Location within France Location within Nouvelle-Aquitaine
- Coordinates: 45°26′55″N 0°11′59″W
- Country: France
- Region: Nouvelle-Aquitaine
- Department: Charente
- Arrondissement: Cognac
- Canton: Charente-Sud
- Commune: Montmérac
- Area^{1}: 14.18 km^{2} (5.47 sq mi)
- Elevation: 145 m (476 ft)
- Highest elevation: 147 m (482 ft)
- Lowest elevation: 61 m (200 ft)
- Population (2023): 515
  - Density: 36.3/km^{2} (94.1/sq mi)
- Time zone: UTC+01:00 (CET)
  - Summer (DST): UTC+02:00 (CEST)
- Postal code: 16300
- ^{1} French Land Register data, which excludes lakes, ponds, glaciers > 1 km^{2} (0.386 sq mi or 247 acres) and river estuaries.

Montchaude (French pronunciation: [mɔ̃ʃod]) is a former commune in the Charente department in southwestern France. On 1 January 2016, it was merged into the new commune Montmérac.

== See also ==
- Communes of the Charente department
