= Hel Bór railway station =

Former PKP railway station in Hel (Pomeranian Voivodeship), Poland

Coordinates: 54°39′N 18°47′E

Hel Bór

General information
- Location: Hel; Poland
- Owner: Polskie Koleje Państwowe S.A.
- Platforms: No

Construction
- Structure type: Building: NO; Depot: No; Water tower: No
Location

Hel Bór is a former PKP railway station in Hel (Pomeranian Voivodeship), Poland. The station was used for military base service.

== Lines crossing the station ==
Start station	End station	Line type
Reda	Hel	Passenger/Freight
