= Pieter Bor =

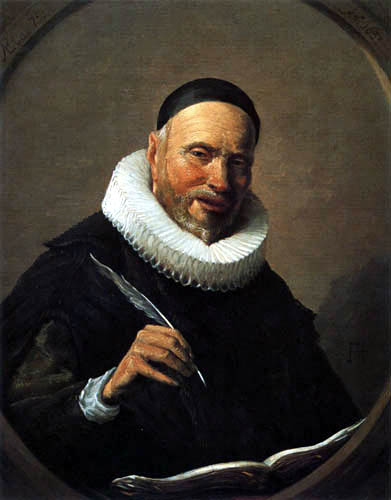
Pieter Bor, copy of his portrait by Frans Hals in 1634

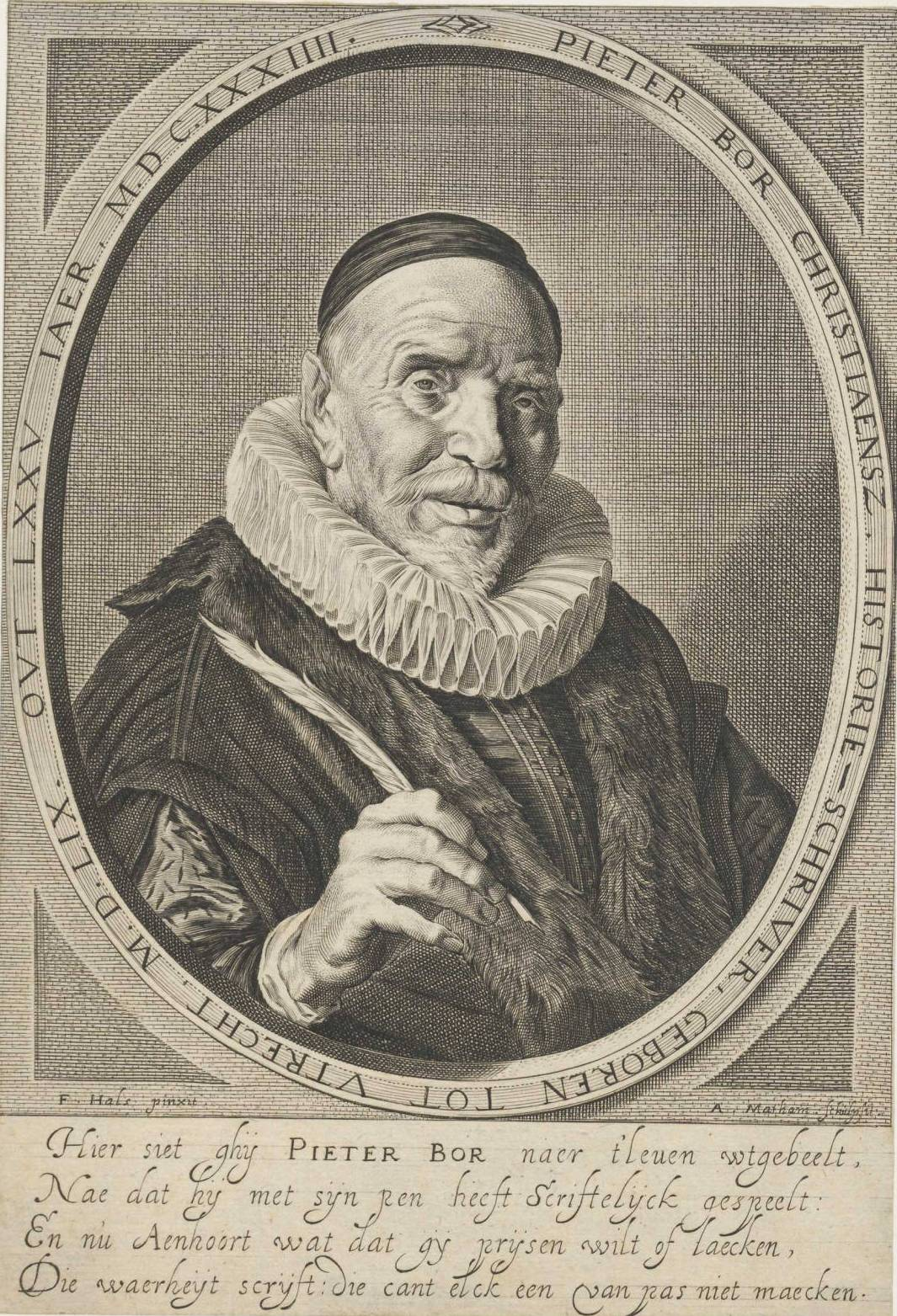
Pieter Bor from the second edition of his 1601 book; 1637 engraving by Adriaen Matham after the Frans Hals portrait

Pieter Bor, or Pieter Christiaensz Bor (1559-1635) was a Dutch Golden Age writer and historian. His portrait was painted by Frans Hals in 1634, and it was engraved for his book in 1637.

== Biography ==
He was born in Utrecht (city) and settled in Haarlem in 1578, where he became a public notary. He moved in 1591 to Leiden, where he is registered as being a notary. He is also registered as having lived and worked in The Hague, Rijswijk, and Beverwijk, before returning to Haarlem, in 1602, where he received an annuity from the Staten General for his history writing. Through his work, he had access to city archives in the places he stayed, and he transcribed these sources for his history writing.

== Works ==
Although he is not registered as a member of a Chamber of Rhetoric, he wrote a few plays that were published in 1617. This stapelspel is based on the same story as Shakespeare's Pericles, Prince of Tyre. This work, which occupied him for 25 years (according to the introduction), was never finished in rhyme, necessary for performances in those days.

He is best known for the historical work he wrote during his years traveling through various cities, called Origin, Beginning, and Continuation of the Dutch Wars (Dutch title: Oorsprongk, Begin, en Vervolgh der Nederlantsche Oorlogen). This work, which was published in 37 installments from 1595-1601, is one of the longest publications generated in the 17th century. It was consolidated and published in 8 volumes in Amsterdam in 1679 and forms an important historic resource for the Dutch Revolt. Bor was a perfectionist who was careful to include both sides to every battle, transcribing documents from both the Dutch rebels and the Spanish Catholics. Many of the original documents have since been lost.

== Trivia ==
In his history, Bor also wrote descriptions of non-military accomplishments such as the last trip to Novaya Zemlya by Willem Barentz.

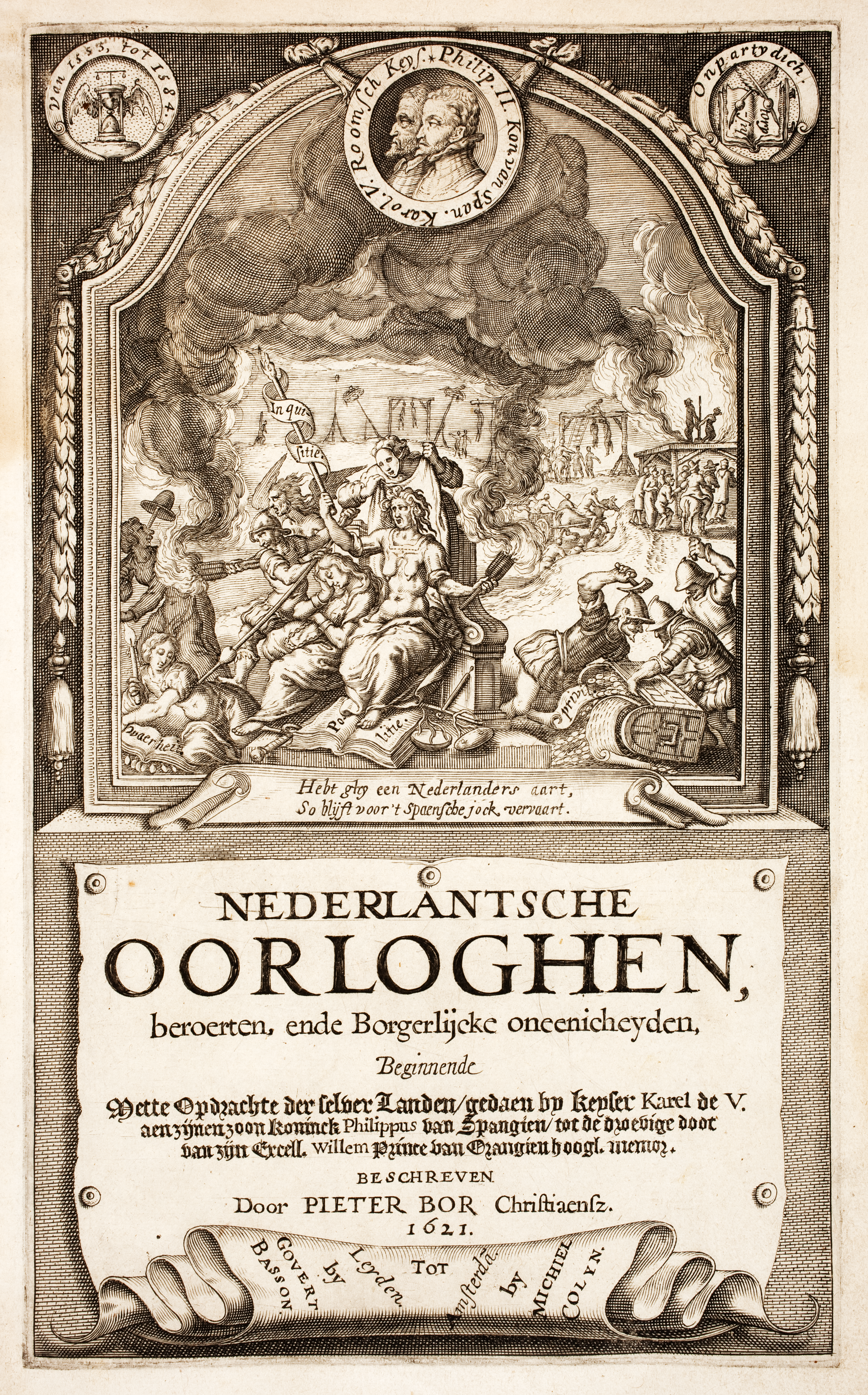
Title page of Pieter Bor: Nederlantsche oorloghen, beroerten, ende borgerlijcke oneenicheyden..., 1621

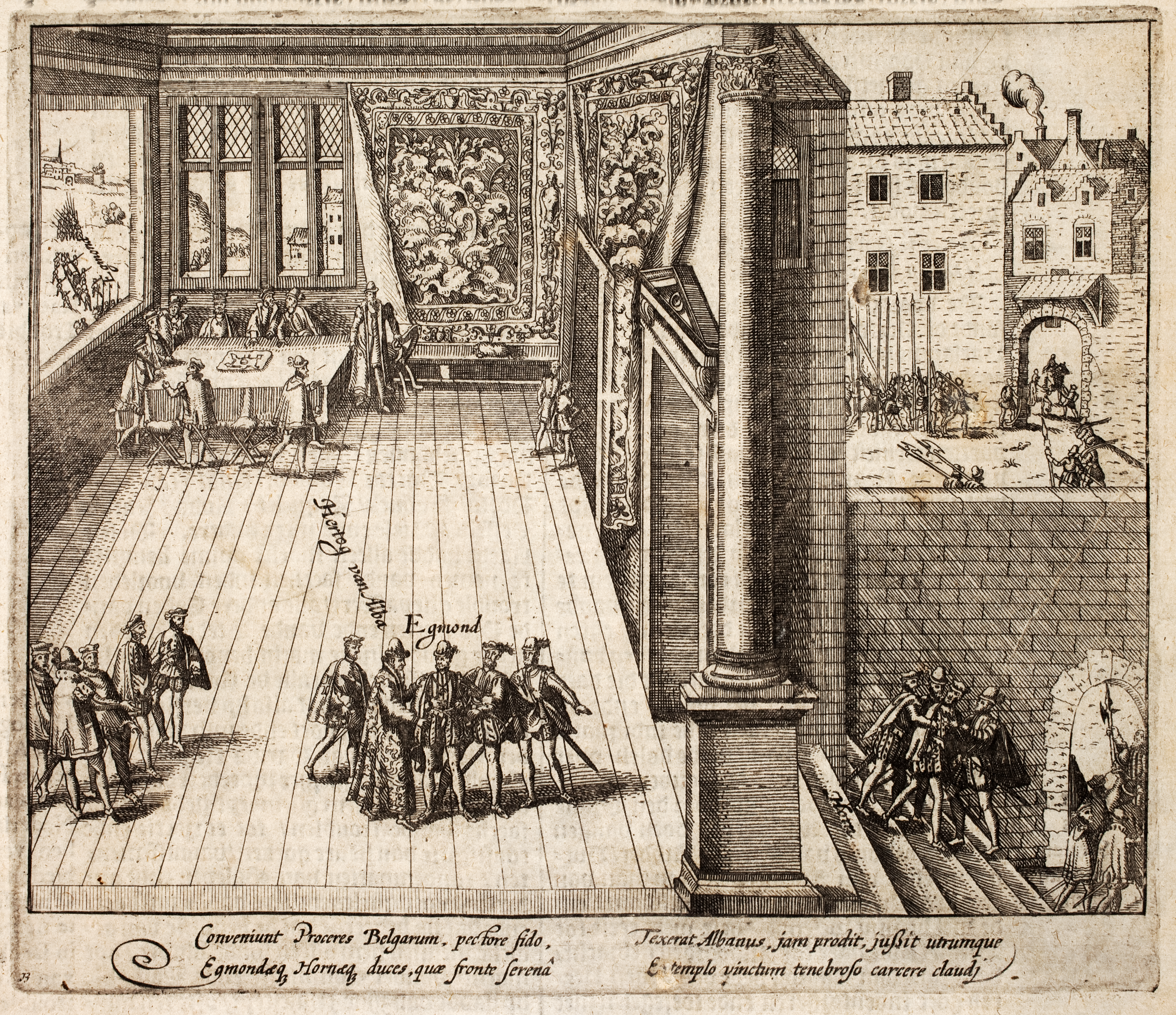
Print from the Nederlantsche oorloghen: the arrest of Egmont and Horne
