= Norman Bor =

Irish botanist

Norman Loftus Bor CIE OBE FRSE FLS FNI (2 May 1893 – 22 December 1972) was an Irish botanist. He was awarded the Linnean Medal of the Linnean Society in 1962.

== Life ==
Bor was born in Tramore, County Waterford in Ireland in 1893, the son of E.C.N. Bor and Mabel Thornton.

He studied at Kilkenny and Mountjoy School in Dublin. He then received a BA at Trinity College, Dublin before travelling to Scotland to obtain a BSc at Edinburgh University in 1921.

On graduating he received a post in the Indian Forest Service where he worked until 1946. During this period (in 1931) he married Eleanor Constance Rundall. During the First World War he served in the Connaught Rangers in France, Greece and Palestine. He was wounded in 1916.

In 1946 he returned to Britain, and in 1948 took the post of assistant director of Kew Gardens in London. He held this post until 1959 when he retired.

His wife died in 1957. They had no children.

In 1962 the Linnean Society awarded him their gold medal, the highest recognition a botanist can receive.

He died in London in 1972.

He was an elder brother of the actor Max Adrian, who died four weeks after him.

== Memberships ==
- Member of the Indian National Science Academy
- President of the Indian Botanical Society
- Fellow of the Linnean Society
- Fellow of the Royal Society of Edinburgh (1947)

== Works ==
- List of the Grasses of Assam (1938)
- Flora of Assam (1940)
- Floras of Cyprus and Iraq
- Manuals of Indian Botany (1953)
- Some Beautiful Indian Climbers and Shrubs (1954)
