= Hilda Bor =

British classical pianist

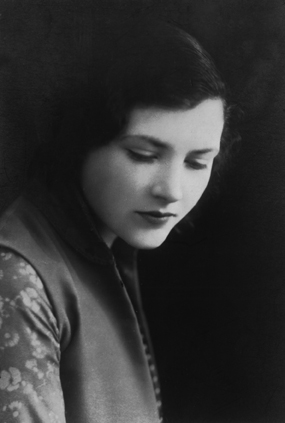
Hilda Bor

Hilda Bor (7 May 1910 – 19 December 1993) was a British classical pianist of Russian-Jewish descent.

== Career ==
A child prodigy, Bor was a recitalist during the 1920s and 1930s. She performed with the Griller Quartet, the Amadeus and the Kantrovich Trio, and was a regular broadcaster for the BBC.

Two of her pianist contemporaries were Eileen Joyce, and Myra Hess, who organised the wartime concerts at the National Gallery. Bor created her own series of lunchtime concerts at London's Royal Exchange.

After World War II she became a piano teacher. Her pupils included Prince Charles and Princess Anne.

== Relatives ==
Hilda Bor was the older sister of violinist and composer Edward Bor. In 2010 Edward completed a book to mark Hilda's centenary year.

Guitarist Rachel Bor (now Rachel Lovell) from the band Dolly Mixture is Hilda Bor's niece. The drummer in Cambridge punk band The Users, Andrew Bor (now Andrew O'Hanrahan), is Hilda Bor's nephew. The founder of Honeycomb Animation, Simon Bor, is also Hilda Bor's nephew.
