= BOR =

BOR may stand for:

- Bill of resources
- Biuro Ochrony Rządu, Polish Government Protection Bureau
- Biology of Reproduction, a reproductive biology scientific journal
- БОР (Russian: Беспилотный Орбитальный Ракетоплан), a series of unmanned Soviet spaceplanes; see Mikoyan-Gurevich MiG-105 § BOR
- Boronia railway station, Melbourne
- British other ranks
- Bureau of Outdoor Recreation, a former agency of the U.S. Department of the Interior
- Oranienburg station, Germany; DS100 station code BOR
- Romanian Orthodox Church, Biserica Ortodoxă Română in Romanian
- Scottish Borders, council area of Scotland, Chapman code

== See also ==
- Bor (disambiguation)
