= Lamérac =

- Part of Montmérac
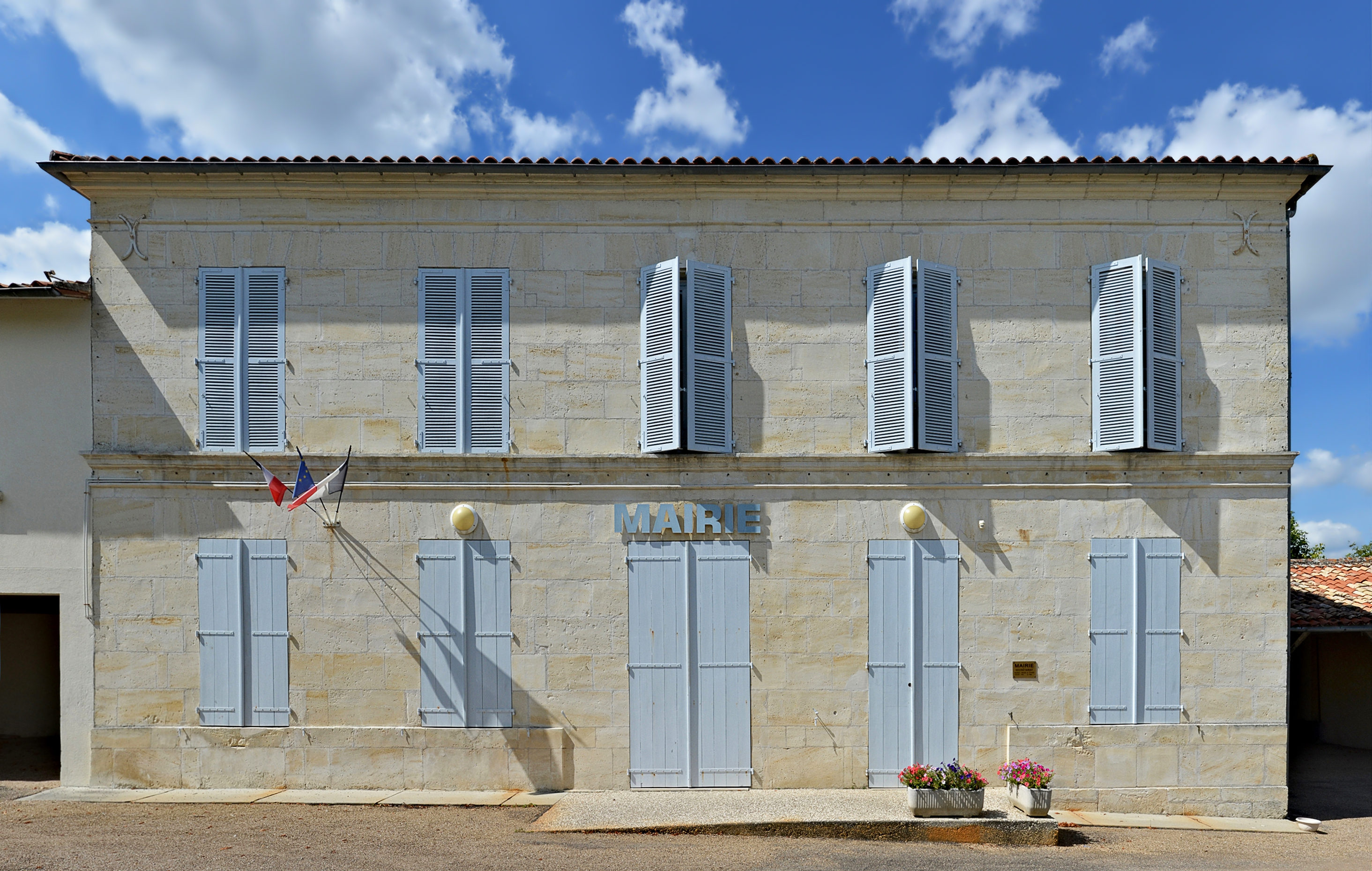
- Town hall
- Location of Lamérac
- Location within France Location within Nouvelle-Aquitaine
- Coordinates: 45°26′09″N 0°13′20″W
- Country: France
- Region: Nouvelle-Aquitaine
- Department: Charente
- Arrondissement: Cognac
- Canton: Baignes-Sainte-Radegonde
- Commune: Montmérac
- Area^{1}: 9.21 km^{2} (3.56 sq mi)
- Elevation: 120 m (390 ft)
- Highest elevation: 114 m (374 ft)
- Lowest elevation: 60 m (200 ft)
- Population (2023): 215
  - Density: 23.3/km^{2} (60.5/sq mi)
- Time zone: UTC+01:00 (CET)
  - Summer (DST): UTC+02:00 (CEST)
- Postal code: 16300
- ^{1} French Land Register data, which excludes lakes, ponds, glaciers > 1 km^{2} (0.386 sq mi or 247 acres) and river estuaries.

Lamérac (French pronunciation: [lameʁak]) was a former commune in the Charente department in southwestern France. On 1 January 2016, it was merged into the new commune of Montmérac.

== See also ==
- Communes of the Charente department
