= Le Tâtre =

- Commune
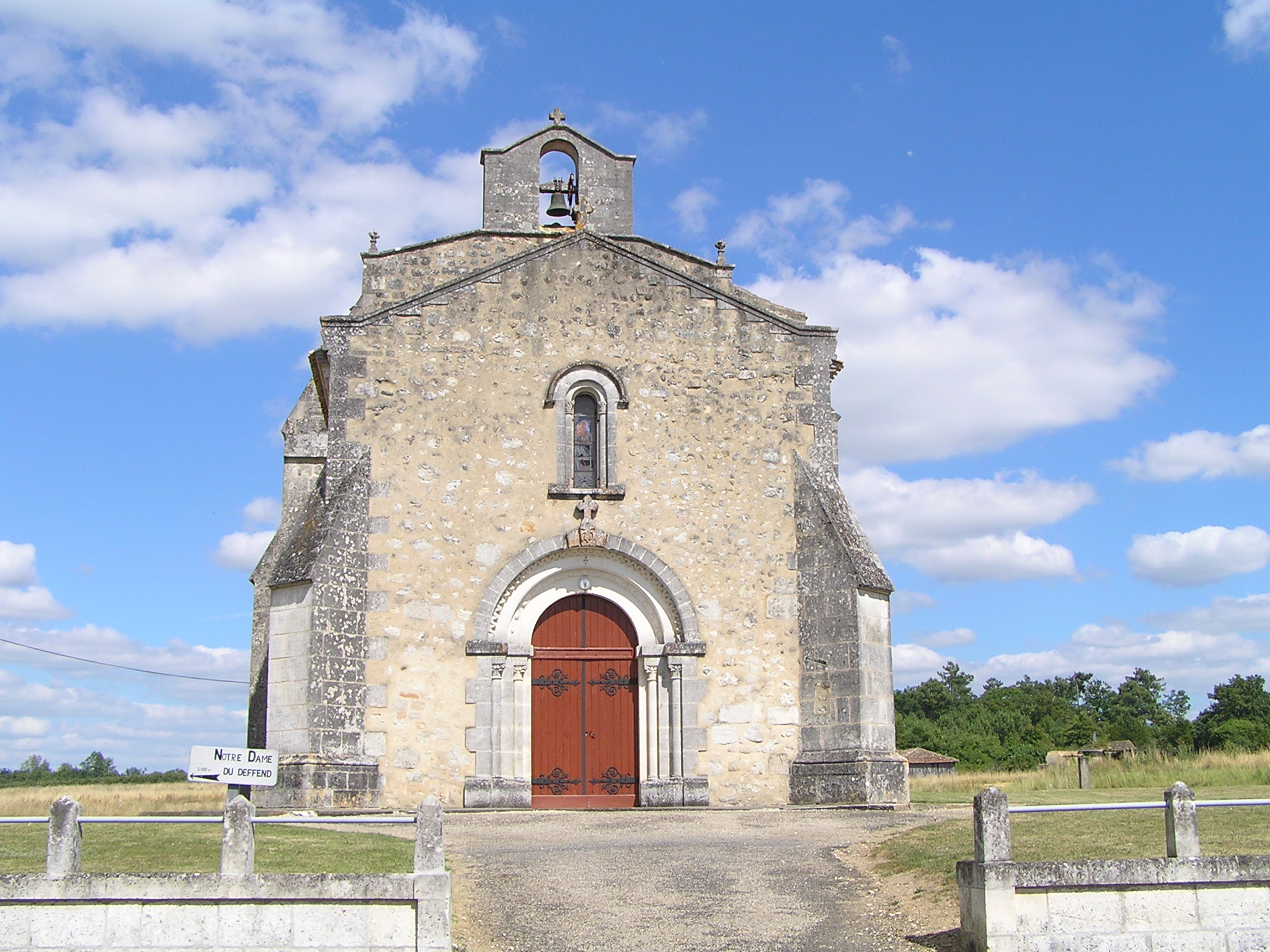
- The church in Le Tâtre
- Location of Le Tâtre
- Location within France Location within Nouvelle-Aquitaine
- Coordinates: 45°23′46″N 0°12′16″W
- Country: France
- Region: Nouvelle-Aquitaine
- Department: Charente
- Arrondissement: Cognac
- Canton: Charente-Sud

Government
  - Mayor (2020–2026): Bernard Desse
- Area^{1}: 6.13 km^{2} (2.37 sq mi)
- Elevation: 146 m (479 ft)
- Highest elevation: 143 m (469 ft)
- Lowest elevation: 73 m (240 ft)
- Population (2023): 431
  - Density: 70.3/km^{2} (182/sq mi)
- Time zone: UTC+01:00 (CET)
  - Summer (DST): UTC+02:00 (CEST)
- INSEE/Postal code: 16380 /16360
- ^{1} French Land Register data, which excludes lakes, ponds, glaciers > 1 km^{2} (0.386 sq mi or 247 acres) and river estuaries.

Le Tâtre (French pronunciation: [lə tatʁ]) is a commune in the Charente department in southwestern France.

== Population ==
Historical population
| Year | Pop. | ±% p.a. |
|---|---|---|
| 1968 | 301 | — |
| 1975 | 313 | +0.56% |
| 1982 | 290 | −1.08% |
| 1990 | 329 | +1.59% |
| 1999 | 314 | −0.52% |
| 2007 | 324 | +0.39% |
| 2012 | 389 | +3.72% |
| 2017 | 394 | +0.26% |
| 2023 | 431 | +1.51% |
Source: INSEE

== See also ==
- Communes of the Charente department
