= Bor language =

Bor language may refer to:

- Southeastern Dinka language
- Belanda Bor language
