= Eleanor Bor =

British writer

Eleanor Constance Bor
- Born: Eleanor Rundall; 1898; Moffat, Scotland
- Died: 1957 (aged 58–59)
- Resting place: Kew Gardens
- Occupation: Writer
- Spouse: Norman Bor

Eleanor Constance Bor née Rundall (1898 – 1957) was a British writer who is remembered for her book The Adventures of a Botanist's Wife, which describes her travels in remote parts of north-eastern India and elsewhere.

== Biography ==
She was born in Moffat, Scotland to Constance and John William Rundall, clergyman and headmaster of St Ninian's School. Her parents’ roots were in England, and she went to a small boarding school near London with one of her sisters. In her early thirties she lived in Assam for two years before marrying her husband, the botanist Norman Bor, in Calcutta in 1931.

Their life together started in Assam. As they moved around they undertook many adventurous expeditions, often in remote mountainous areas and including a visit to Tibet. They also had one or two longer stays in established settlements. For Eleanor Bor, four years in Dehradun were mainly spent writing and drawing as she and her husband did not enjoy the social life of a British hill station. During this time they twice went to Lahaul "journeying deep into the mountains over high passes to the snowline" on ponies, and Bor wrote three books, apparently never published. She sketched in many different locations and carried crayons on her travels.

When they went home on leave they travelled through other parts of India, Malaya, Hong Kong and the USA. They returned to live in the UK in 1946, and a few years later Bor's book was very well received. Reviews praised the energy and vividness of the writing as well as the quality of the author's drawings included in the book. Her originality was emphasised by critics, as was her sympathetic interest in the local people in the different places she went to.

Norman Bor named a grass he discovered after her: Poa eleanorae Bor She described it as an "emaciated, wizened looking affair, apparently of intense interest to a botanist".

At the end of her life she had a "distressing" illness and her husband nursed her until her death in 1957. Her ashes were scattered in the azalea garden at Kew Gardens, like her husband's after her.
