= Vanzac =

- Commune
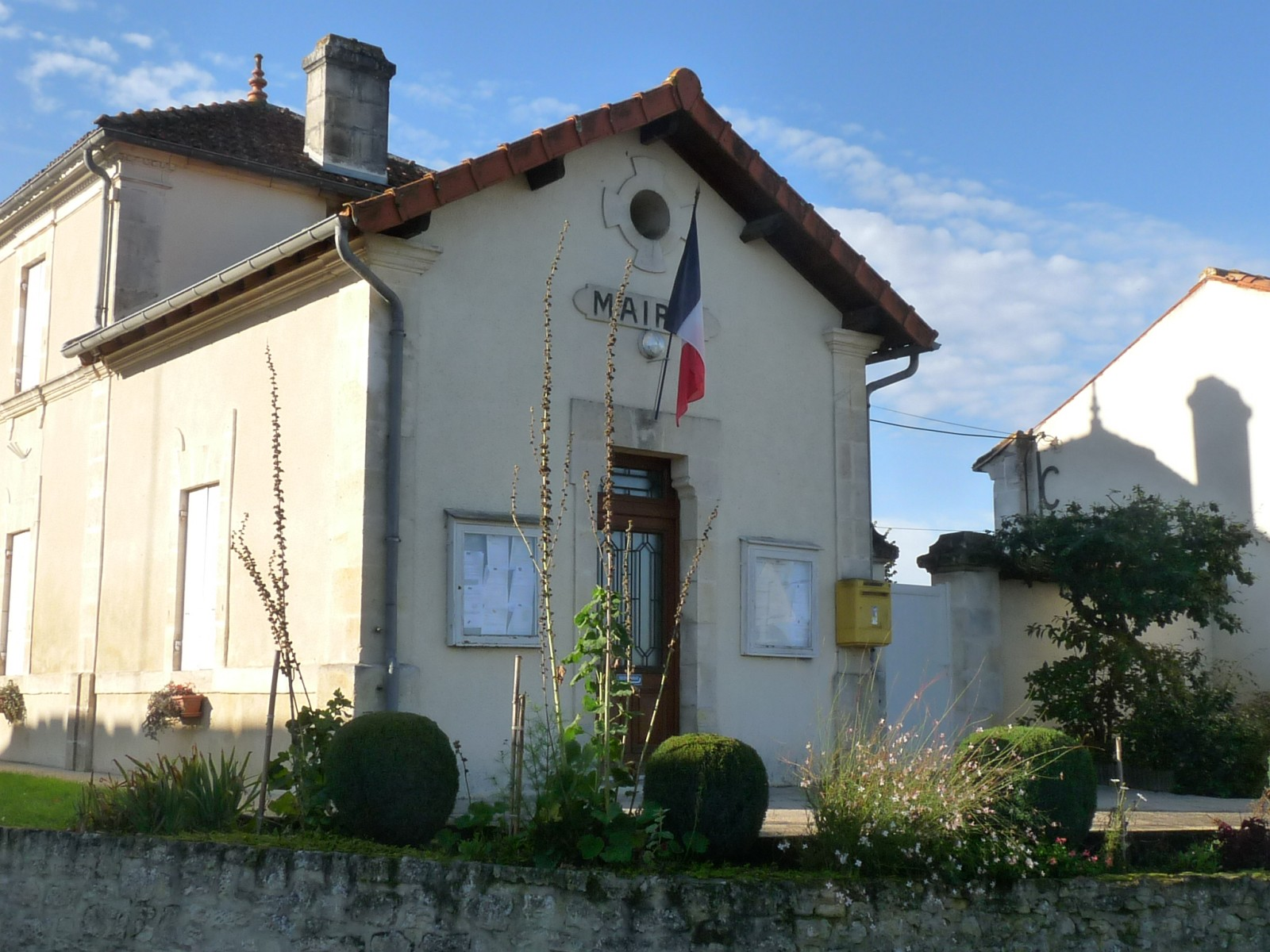
- The town hall in Vanzac
- Location of Vanzac
- Location within France Location within Nouvelle-Aquitaine
- Coordinates: 45°21′29″N 0°18′13″W
- Country: France
- Region: Nouvelle-Aquitaine
- Department: Charente-Maritime
- Arrondissement: Jonzac
- Canton: Les Trois Monts
- Intercommunality: Haute-Saintonge

Government
  - Mayor (2020–2026): Raphaël Georgeon
- Area^{1}: 6.39 km^{2} (2.47 sq mi)
- Elevation: 61 m (200 ft)
- Highest elevation: 101 m (331 ft)
- Lowest elevation: 53 m (174 ft)
- Population (2023): 198
  - Density: 31.0/km^{2} (80.3/sq mi)
- Time zone: UTC+01:00 (CET)
  - Summer (DST): UTC+02:00 (CEST)
- INSEE/Postal code: 17458 /17500
- ^{1} French Land Register data, which excludes lakes, ponds, glaciers > 1 km^{2} (0.386 sq mi or 247 acres) and river estuaries.

Vanzac (French pronunciation: [vɑ̃zak]) is a commune in the Charente-Maritime department in southwestern France.

== Population ==
Historical population
Year	Pop.	±% p.a.
1968	228	—
1975	191	−2.50%
1982	193	+0.15%
1990	173	−1.36%
1999	174	+0.06%
2007	174	+0.00%
2012	180	+0.68%
2017	148	−3.84%
2023	198	+4.97%
Source: INSEE

== See also ==
- Communes of the Charente-Maritime department
