= Chantillac =

- Commune
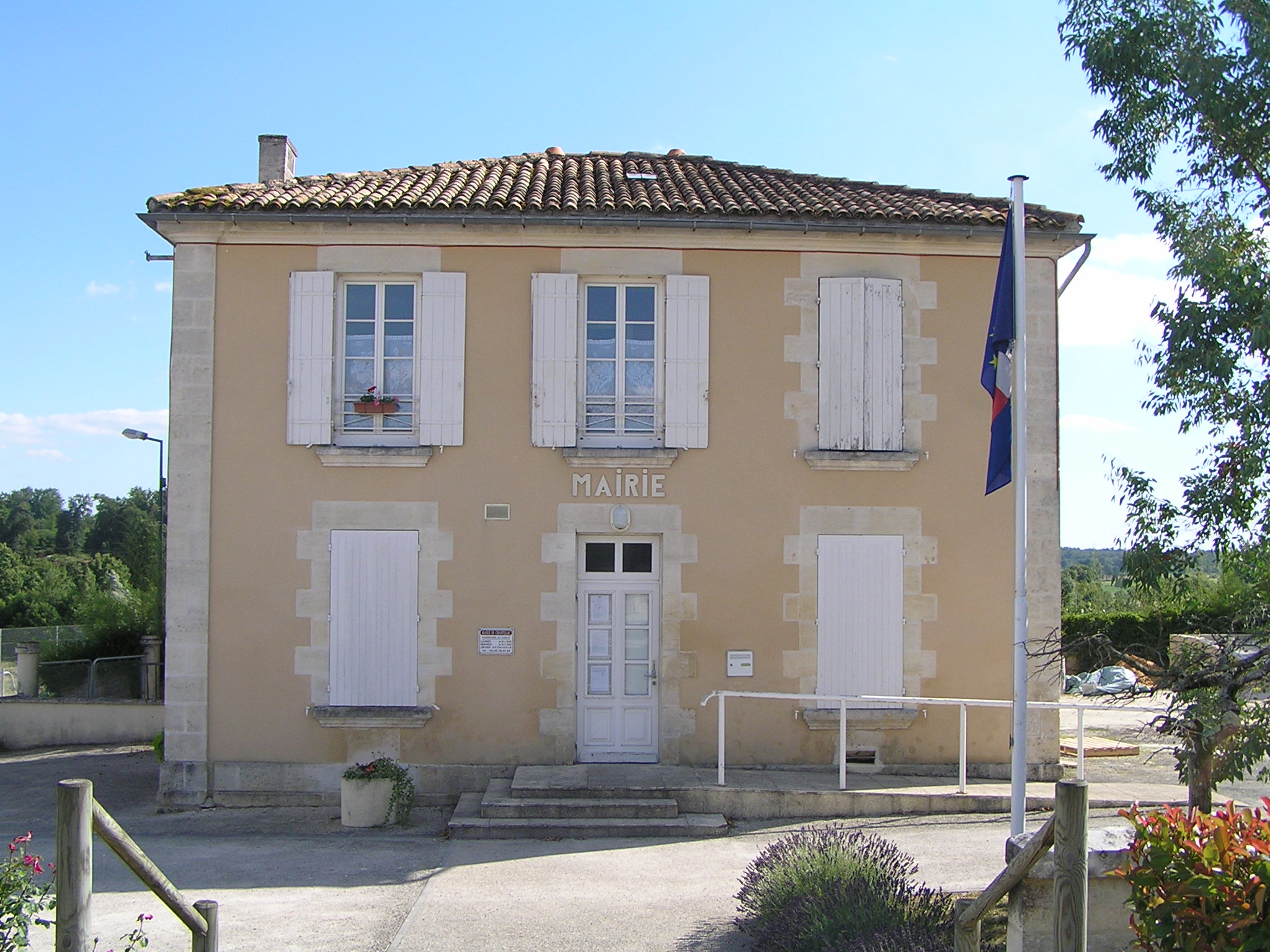
- Town hall
- Location of Chantillac
- Location within France Location within Nouvelle-Aquitaine
- Coordinates: 45°19′24″N 0°15′16″W
- Country: France
- Region: Nouvelle-Aquitaine
- Department: Charente
- Arrondissement: Cognac
- Canton: Charente-Sud
- Intercommunality: 4B Sud-Charente

Government
  - Mayor (2020–2026): Jean-Marie Veyssière
- Area^{1}: 18.05 km^{2} (6.97 sq mi)
- Elevation: 145 m (476 ft)
- Highest elevation: 151 m (495 ft)
- Lowest elevation: 65 m (213 ft)
- Population (2023): 370
  - Density: 20/km^{2} (53/sq mi)
- Time zone: UTC+01:00 (CET)
  - Summer (DST): UTC+02:00 (CEST)
- INSEE/Postal code: 16079 /16360
- ^{1} French Land Register data, which excludes lakes, ponds, glaciers > 1 km^{2} (0.386 sq mi or 247 acres) and river estuaries.

Chantillac (French pronunciation: [ʃɑ̃tijak]) is a commune in the Charente department of southwestern France.

== Population ==
Historical population
Year	Pop.	±% p.a.
1968	451	—
1975	410	−1.35%
1982	332	−2.97%
1990	319	−0.50%
1999	277	−1.56%
2007	278	+0.05%
2012	300	+1.53%
2017	332	+2.05%
2023	370	+1.82%
Source: INSEE

== See also ==
- Communes of the Charente department
