= Dekel Bor =

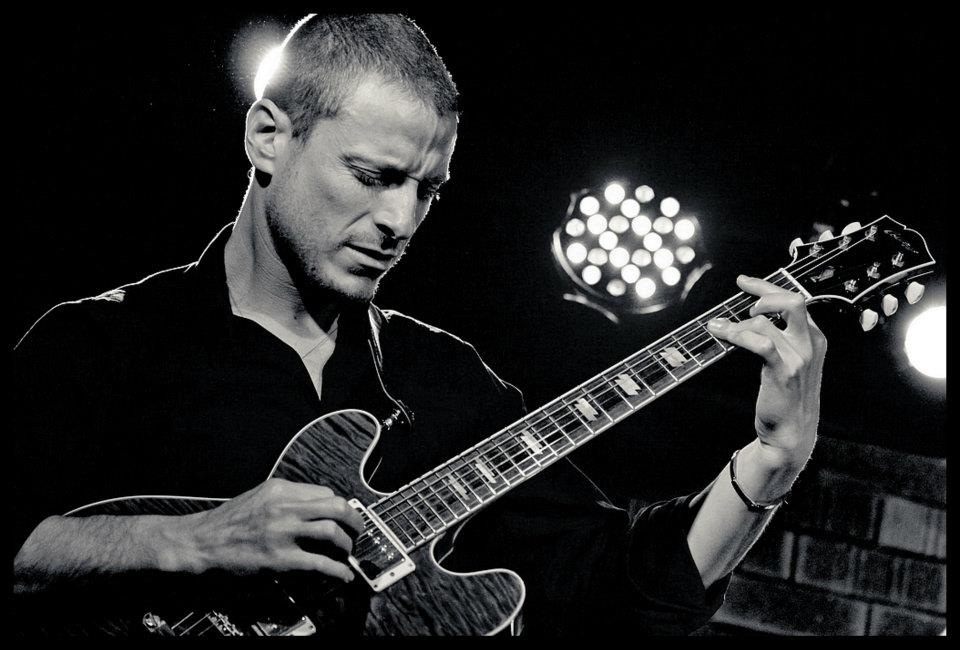
Dekel Bor endorsing Collings Guitars

Dekel Bor (Hebrew: דקל בור) is an Israeli jazz guitarist and composer.

== Early life ==
Bor is the son of Anat Bor, a visual artist exhibiting throughout Israel, and Alon Bor, principal percussionist for the Israel Philharmonic Orchestra and recipient of the Presidential Award for music education.

Dekel Bor started playing guitar at age 15. As student at Thelma Yelin High-School of Arts, Bor studied jazz history, ear training and theory. During his studies, he played with fellow students Eli Degibri, Avishai Cohen, Daniel Zamir and others, and performed throughout Israel.

== Denmark ==
Given a full scholarship to the Royal Danish Academy, Bor moved to Copenhagen at the age of 19. He became a fixture on the local jazz scene, performing regularly at La Fontaine Jazz Club, where he was heard by Niels-Henning Ørsted Pedersen who took him under his wing, featuring him in concerts throughout Denmark both in his trio as well as with saxophonist Johnny Griffin.

== New York ==
At 21, Bor moved to New York to attend The New School on a full scholarship. A month into his freshman year, Bor performed at the school's auditorium where the school's artistic director Reggie Workman heard the young guitarist and immediately extended an invitation to join the master at a church concert tour of the East Coast. This started a long mentoring relationship which helped Bor shape his musical commitment and artistic depth.

== The Trio ==
At the end of his freshman year, Bor started his own trio teaming with Nadav Snir-Zelniker on drums and Francois Moutin on bass. The performed twice a week at New York jazz club Cafe Creole, focusing on original compositions by Bor. Bor's style began taking shape, and artists such as Lew Solof, John Fedjock, Brian Versace and others sat in and played with Bor and his band.

From Cafe Creole, Bor and his band began touring throughout the East Coast and the Midwest, performing at clubs, theaters and small festivals. During this time Bor performed with Gregory Hutchinson, Roy Hargrove, Pat Martino, Horace Parlan, Billy Hart, Buster Williams, Adam Nussbaum, Charly Persip, Donny McCasslin, Adam Rogers (musician), Ari Hoenig, Rachel Z, Russell Malone, Francois Moutin, Clarence Penn and Dafnis Prieto

After a Sunday night show at a NYC club, Bor was approached by producer Robert Sadin. Bor and Sadin formed a close mentoring relationship, releasing two albums of original music: Emuna, and (The Long Way) Home.

== Collaborations ==
Bor frequently collaborates in performance with artists from various mediums such as the Israel Philharmonic Orchestra, French choreographer Nelly Van-Bommel, Israeli rock musician Maor Cohen, American choreographer David Parsons, Israeli poet Raquel Chalfi, Tom Harrell, and Dweezil Zappa.

== Bach Electrified ==
In 2012 Bor toured across Europe performing trio arrangements of music by Johann Sebastian Bach, focusing mainly on the violin sonatas and the Goldberg Variations. Concerts and festivals in Israel, Germany and New York were recorded and filmed for an upcoming documentary, with TV specials in Germany, Israel and Canada.

== Covalence: Improvised Duets ==
In 2014 Bor began a series of improvised duets with major non-musician artists, among them Dan Ariely, German actor Christian Berkel, author Meir Shalev, chef Eyal Shani, Israeli Knesset member Merav Michaeli and Israeli actor Moshe Ivgy. The series will continue throughout 2014 at Habima National Theatre in Tel Aviv and move on to London and New-York.

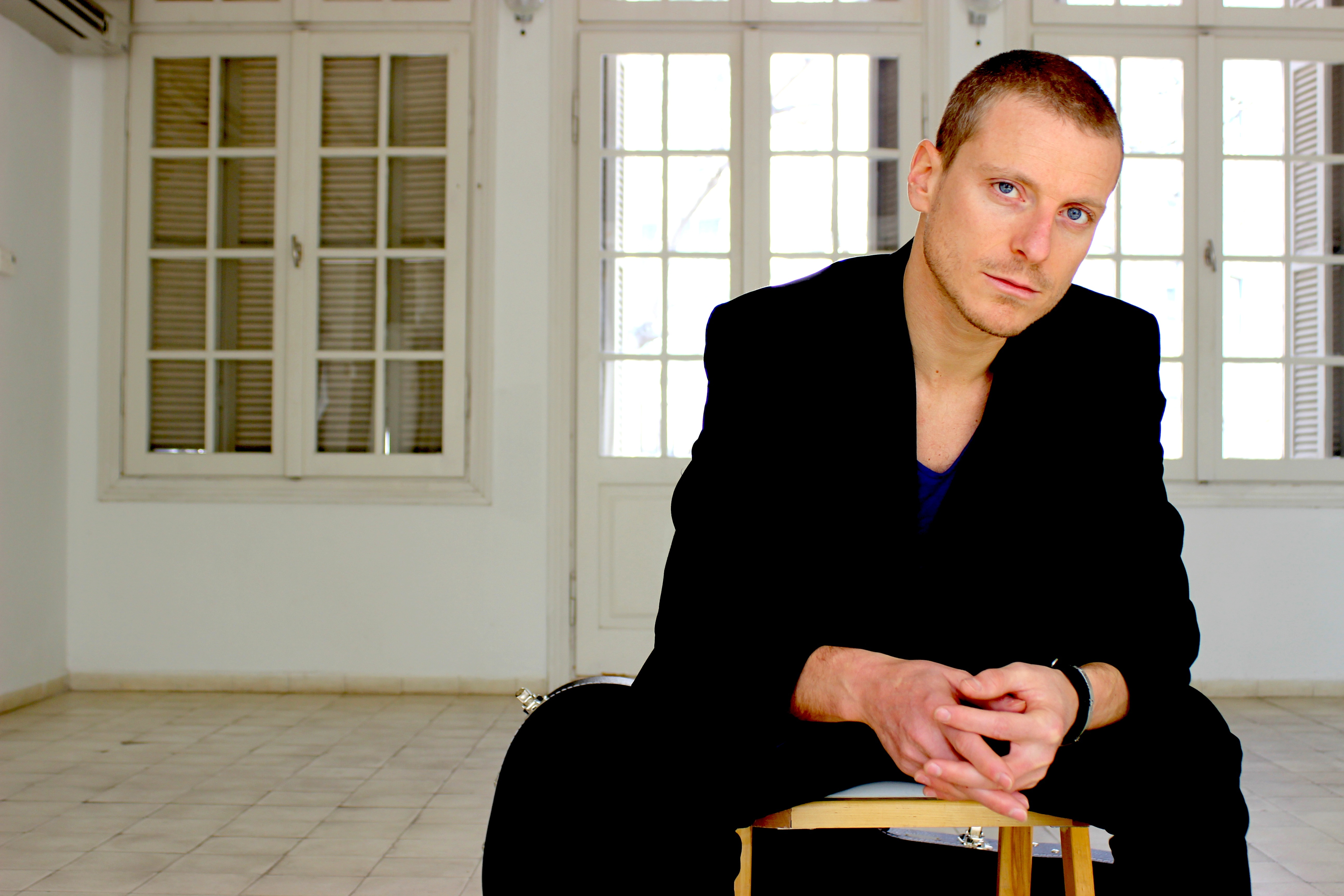
Dekel Bor Time-Out article

== TEDx Hamburg: Urban Connectors ==
Bor was invited to speak at TEDx Hamburg as part of a panel of "Urban Connectors" about his duet series, after which he improvised with German actor Christian Berkel.

== BMW Motorrad & Injury ==
A life-long motorcycle rider, Dekel served as global brand ambassador for BMW Motorrad.

Bor was seriously injured in a motorcycle accident in August 2015. Bor suffered major trauma, and his condition was listed as critical upon arrival at a medical facility for treatment. All of his scheduled performances and appearances after that event were canceled.

== Discography ==
- Let Love Rule (2020)
- (The Long Way) Home (2008)
- Emuna (Leaps of Faith) (2006)
- Stories & Tales (2004)

== Sources ==
- האתגר הגדול הבא של גיטריסט הג'ז דקל בור [The Next Big Challenge of Jazz Guitarist Dekel Bor]. Haaretz (in Hebrew). 10 March 2014.
- Davis, Barry (7 January 2011). "While jazz guitarist Dekel Bor has taken a big bite out of the Big Apple, he is fine-tuning his taste level here at home". The Jerusalem Post.
- Reider, Maxim (23 February 2012). "Jerusalem Post: A chance to play perfect music". The Jerusalem Post.
- Speaker Profiles at TEDxHamburg.de
- A Short Call with Christian Berkel
- Dekel Bor profile at collingsguitars.com
