= Bór =

Bór may refer to:

- Bór, Greater Poland Voivodeship (west-central Poland)
- Bór, Lesser Poland Voivodeship (south Poland)
- Bór, Gmina Józefów nad Wisłą in Opole County, Lublin Voivodeship (east Poland)
- Bór, Zamość County in Lublin Voivodeship (east Poland)
- Bór, Podlaskie Voivodeship (north-east Poland)
- Bór, Pomeranian Voivodeship (north Poland)
- Tadeusz Bór-Komorowski, a Polish officer and Commander of the Home Army
