= Bors, Canton of Charente-Sud =

Bors
- Commune
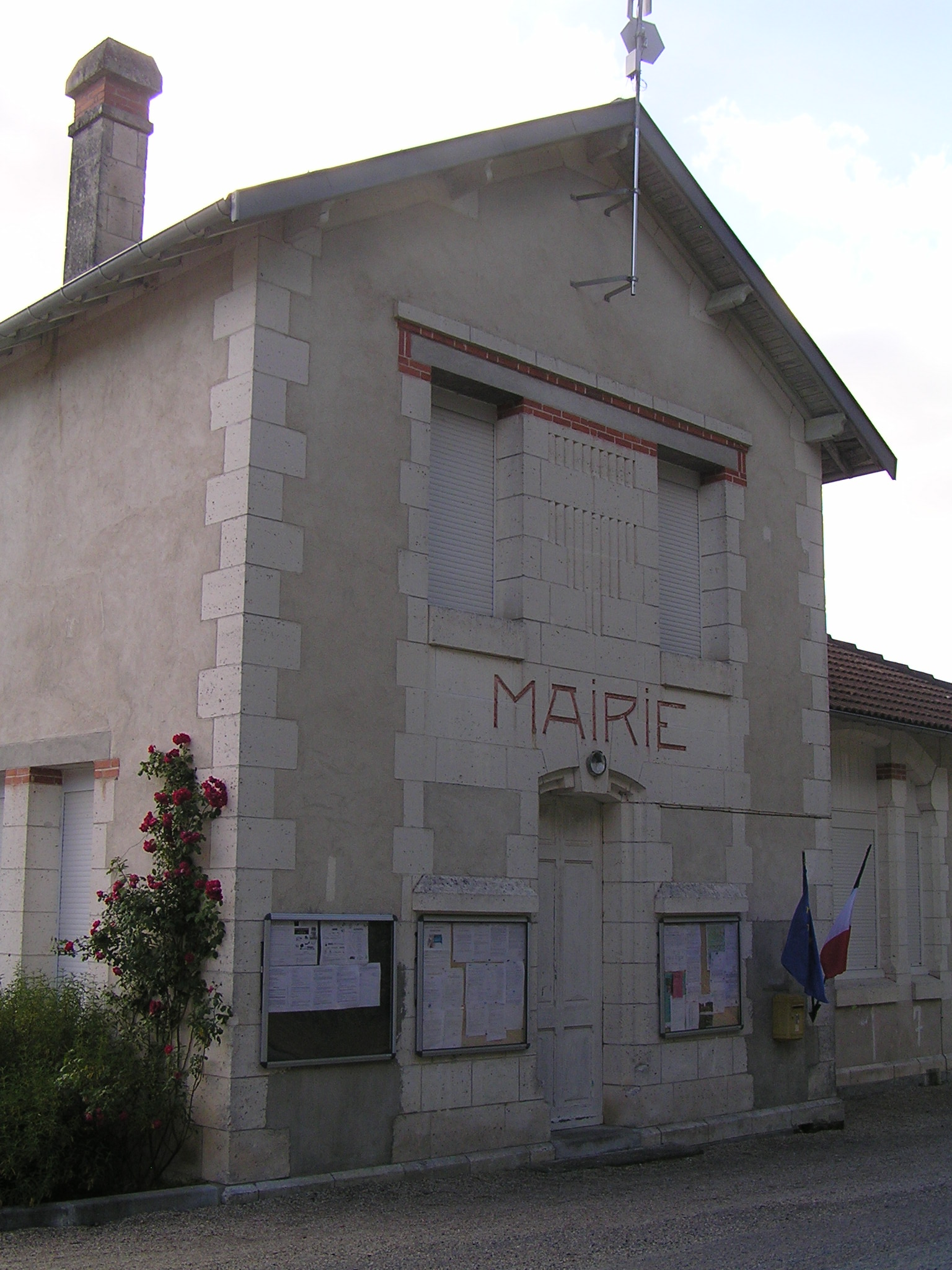
- Town hall
- Location of Bors
- Location within France Location within Nouvelle-Aquitaine
- Coordinates: 45°19′44″N 0°11′34″W
- Country: France
- Region: Nouvelle-Aquitaine
- Department: Charente
- Arrondissement: Cognac
- Canton: Charente-Sud
- Intercommunality: 4B - Sud-Charente

Government
  - Mayor (2020–2026): Patrick Jolly
- Area^{1}: 12.28 km^{2} (4.74 sq mi)
- Elevation: 102 m (335 ft)
- Highest elevation: 144 m (472 ft)
- Lowest elevation: 68 m (223 ft)
- Population (2023): 119
  - Density: 9.69/km^{2} (25.1/sq mi)
- Time zone: UTC+01:00 (CET)
  - Summer (DST): UTC+02:00 (CEST)
- INSEE/Postal code: 16053 /16360
- ^{1} French Land Register data, which excludes lakes, ponds, glaciers > 1 km^{2} (0.386 sq mi or 247 acres) and river estuaries.

Bors (also referred to as Bors-de-Baignes, to distinguish it from Bors near Montmoreau-Saint-Cybard) is a commune in the Charente department in southwestern France.

== Population ==
Historical population
| Year | Pop. | ±% p.a. |
|---|---|---|
| 1968 | 177 | — |
| 1975 | 161 | −1.34% |
| 1982 | 149 | −1.10% |
| 1990 | 167 | +1.44% |
| 1999 | 148 | −1.33% |
| 2007 | 128 | −1.80% |
| 2012 | 126 | −0.31% |
| 2017 | 116 | −1.64% |
| 2023 | 119 | +0.43% |
Source: INSEE

== See also ==
- Communes of the Charente department
