= Donell Jones discography =

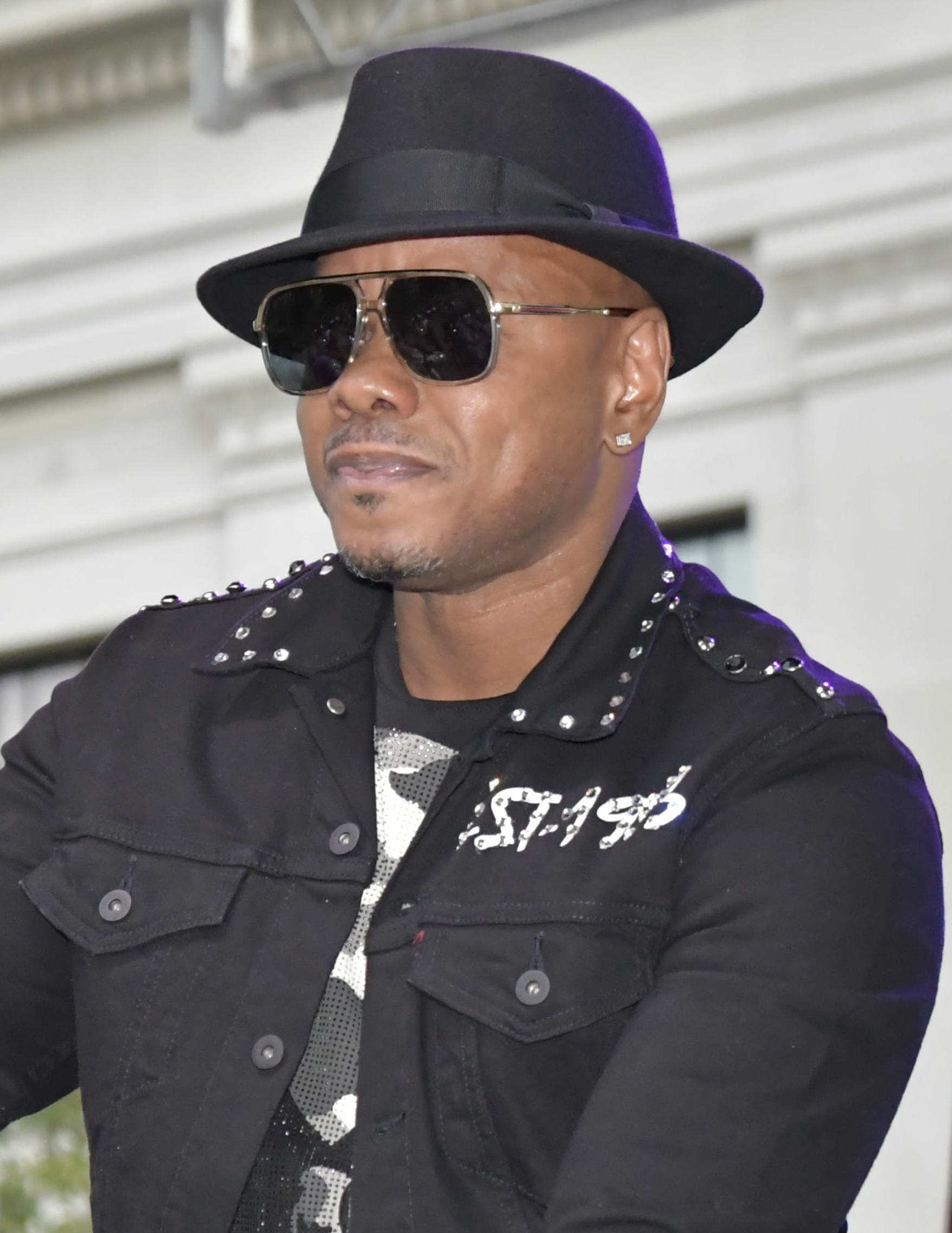
- Jones in 2019.
- Studio albums: 6
- Compilation albums: 2

This is the discography of American R&B singer Donell Jones.

== Albums ==
=== Studio albums ===
List of albums, with selected chart positions
Title	Album details	Peak chart positions			Certifications
Title	Album details	US	US R&B	UK	Certifications
My Heart	Released: June 4, 1996; Label: Untouchables Entertainment, LaFace; Format: CD, CS	180	30	99	
Where I Wanna Be	Released: October 12, 1999; Label: Untouchables Entertainment, LaFace; Format: CD, CS	35	6	47	RIAA: Platinum; BPI: Gold
Life Goes On	Released: June 4, 2002; Label: LaFace; Format: CD, digital download	3	2	62	RIAA: Gold; BPI: Silver
Journey of a Gemini	Released: June 20, 2006; Label: LaFace, Jive; Format: CD, digital download	15	1	—	
Lyrics	Released: September 28, 2010; Label: Candyman, eOne; Format: CD, digital download	28	9	—	
Forever	Released: July 9, 2013; Label: Candyman, eOne; Format: CD, digital download	20	8	—	
100% Free	Released: February 14, 2021; Label: Candyman Music Inc.; Format: digital download	—	—	—	
"—" denotes releases that did not chart or were not released in that territory.

=== Compilation albums ===
Title	Album details	Peak chart positions	
Title	Album details	US	US R&B
The Best of Donell Jones	Released: September 25, 2007; Label: LaFace; Format: CD, digital download	123	17
The Lost Files	Released: November 24, 2009; Label: Candyman, TuneCore; Format: Digital download	—	—
"—" denotes releases that did not chart or were not released in that territory.

== Singles ==
=== As lead artist ===
List of singles, with selected chart positions
Title	Year	Peak chart positions					Certifications	Album
Title	Year	US	US R&B	AUS	NZ	UK	Certifications	Album
"In the Hood"	1996	79	21	—	26	—		My Heart
"Knocks Me Off My Feet"	1996	49	14	—	28	58		My Heart
"You Should Know"	1997	—	—	—	—	—		My Heart
"U Know What's Up" (featuring Lisa Lopes)	1999	7	1	55	30	2	BPI: Platinum	Where I Wanna Be
"Shorty (Got Her Eyes on Me)"	1999	—	80	—	30	19		Where I Wanna Be
"This Luv"	2000	—	48	—	—	—		Where I Wanna Be
"Where I Wanna Be"	2000	29	2	—	—	—		Where I Wanna Be
"Do What I Gotta Do"	2000	—	102	—	—	—		Shaft soundtrack
"You Know That I Love You"	2002	54	16	—	—	41		Life Goes On
"Put Me Down" (featuring Styles P)	2002	98	49	—	—	—		Life Goes On
"Freakin' U" (featuring Fat Joe)	2002	—	—	—	—	—		Life Goes On
"Do U Wanna"	2003	—	—	—	—	—		Life Goes On
"Better Start Talking" (featuring Jermaine Dupri)	2005	—	72	—	—	—		Journey of a Gemini
"I'm Gonna Be" (featuring Clipse)	2006	—	41	—	—	—		Journey of a Gemini
"Special Girl"	2006	—	—	—	—	—		Journey of a Gemini
"Ooh Na Na"	2007	—	63	—	—	—		Journey of a Gemini
"Spend the Night"	2007	—	74	—	—	—		Journey of a Gemini
"Love Like This"	2010	—	25	—	—	—		Lyrics
"All About the Sex"	2011	—	58	—	—	—		Lyrics
"Forever"	2013	—	—	—	—	—		Forever
"Closer I Get to You" (featuring Alja Kamillion)	2013	—	—	—	—	—		Forever
"Never Let Her Go" (featuring David Banner)	2016	—	—	—	—	—		Non-album release
"Understand" (with Jon B.)	2019	—	—	—	—	—		Non-album release
"Karma (Payback)"	2020	—	—	—	—	—		100% Free
"—" denotes releases that did not chart or were not released in that territory.

=== As featured artist ===
List of singles, with selected chart positions
Title	Year	Peak chart positions				Album
Title	Year	US	US R&B	NZ	UK	Album
"It's So Hard" (Big Pun featuring Donell Jones)	2000	75	19	—	—	Yeeeah Baby
"True Step Tonight" (True Steppers featuring Brian Harvey & Donell Jones)	2000	—	—	—	25	True Stepping
"Breathe (Better Days)" (Mystic featuring & Donell Jones)	2003	—	—	—	—	Cuts for Luck and Scars for Freedom
"Don't Trip" (LC featuring Donell Jones)	2010	—	—	—	—	Non-album single
"—" denotes releases that did not chart or were not released in that territory.
