= The Best of Donell Jones =

Greatest hits album by Donell Jones
- Released: September 25, 2007
- Recorded: 1995–2006
- Genre: R&B
- Length: 53:06
- Label: LaFace; Jive
- Producer: Absolam; Mike City; Eddie F.; Sean Garrett; Sheldon Goode; Jamie Hawkins; Wesley Hogges; Donell Jones; Ryan Leslie; Darren Lighty; Richard Smith; Tim & Bob; Kyle West; Darin Whittington; Eric Williams

Donell Jones chronology
Journey of a Gemini (2006)	The Best of Donell Jones (2007)	The Lost Files (2009)

The Best of Donell Jones is a greatest hits album by R&B singer Donell Jones. It was released by LaFace Records and Jive Records on September 25, 2007 in the United States where it peaked at number 17 on the US Top R&B/Hip-Hop Albums.

== Track listing ==
No.	Title	Writer(s)	Producer	Length
1.	"U Know What's Up"	Edward Ferrell; Darren Lighty; Clifton Lighty; Balewa Muhammad; Anthony Hamilton; Clifford Harris; Delvis Damon	Eddie F.; Darren Lighty	4:01
2.	"Spend the Night"	Donell Jones; Michael Flowers	Mike City	4:20
3.	"Where I Wanna Be"	Jones; Kyle West	Jones; West	4:13
4.	"I'm Gonna Be"	Jones; Tim Kelley; Bob Robinson	Tim & Bob	4:46
5.	"You Know that I Love You"	Jamie Hawkins; Chris Absolam; Richard Smith	Hawkins; Absolam; Smith	4:20
6.	"This Luv"	Jones; Sheldon Goode	Jones; Goode	4:09
7.	"Shorty (Got Her Eyes on Me)"	Jones; Eric Williams; Wesley Hogges; Christopher Leslie; Melvin Lewis; Thomas Martin	Jones; Williams; Hogges	3:12
8.	"Better Start Talking" (featuring Jermaine Dupri)	Dupri; Ryan Leslie; Sean Garrett	Leslie; Garrett	4:12
9.	"Where You Are (Is Where I Wanna Be) (Part 2)"	Jones; West	Jones; West	3:49
10.	"Cry"	Jones; Absolam; Smith; Daryl Hall; John Oates	Jones; Absolam; Smith	4:02
11.	"Still"	Hawkins; Absolam; Smith	Hawkins; Absolam; Smith	3:50
12.	"Put Me Down"	Ferrell; D. Lighty; C. Lighty; Muhammad; Keir Gist; Jamie Wilson	Eddie F.; Darren Lighty	4:20
13.	"Knocks Me Off My Feet"	Stevie Wonder	Darin Whittington	3:43

== Charts ==
Chart (2007)	Peak position
US Billboard 200	123
US Top R&B/Hip-Hop Albums (Billboard)	17
