= Save the Last Dance (soundtrack) =

2000 soundtrack album by various artists

Music from the Motion Picture Save the Last Dance

Soundtrack album by various artists
- Released: December 19, 2000
- Genres: Hip hop; contemporary R&B
- Length: 59:27
- Label: Hollywood
- Producers: Mitchell Lieb (exec.); Robert W. Cort (exec.); Thomas Carter (exec.); Anthony President; Babyface; Battlecat; Brainz Dimilo; Brian "Lilz" Palmer; Christopher Troy; Darrell "Delite" Allamby; Darren Lighty; Darryl Anthony; Davinci; Eddie F; Fredro Starr; J Dilla; Jaye & Sweet; One Eye; Puff Daddy; Sergio 'PLX' Moore; Sly and Robbie; Stevie J; The Whole 9; Zack Harmon

Professional ratings
Review scores
Source	Rating
AllMusic	3/5 stars
RapReviews	3.5/10

Music from the Motion Picture Save the Last Dance is the first soundtrack album to Thomas Carter's 2001 dance film Save the Last Dance. It was released on December 19, 2000 through Hollywood Records and consisted of hip hop and contemporary R&B music. It features contributions from 112, Athena Cage, Chaka Demus & Pliers, Donell Jones, Fredro Starr, Ice Cube, Jill Scott, K-Ci & JoJo, Kevon Edmonds, Lucy Pearl, Montell Jordan, Notorious B.I.G., Pink, Snoop Dogg, Soulbone, Q-Tip and X-2-C.

The soundtrack made it to several Billboard charts. It peaked at number 3 on the Billboard 200, number 2 on the Top R&B/Hip-Hop Albums, number 6 on the Top Soundtracks, number 3 on the Top Internet Albums and number 2 on the Canadian Albums Chart. It also spawned two charting singles: "Crazy" and "You". The album went both gold and platinum on January 29, 2001 and was certified 2x multi-platinum by the Recording Industry Association of America on May 20, 2002. It won the American Music Award for Favorite Soundtrack in 2002.

== Track listing ==
No.	Title	Writer(s)	Producer(s)	Length
1.	"Shining Through (Theme from Save the Last Dance)" (Fredro Starr and Jill Scott)	Billy Steinberg; Tom Kelly	Davinci; Fredro Starr	3:50
2.	"You" (Lucy Pearl, Snoop Dogg, and Q-Tip)	Charles Ray Wiggins; Kevin Gilliam; Calvin Cordozar Broadus Jr.; Jonathan Davis	DJ Battlecat; Raphael Saadiq	4:25
3.	"Bonafide" (X-2-C)	Jeremy Monroe; Georgette Franklin; Erik Isaacs; Craig Owens	Jaye & Sweet	4:02
4.	"Crazy" (K-Ci & JoJo)	Darrell Delite Allamby; Lincoln Link Browder; Joel Hailey; Cedric Hailey	Darrell "Delite" Allamby	3:40
5.	"You Make Me Sick" (Pink)	Anthony President; Brainz Dimilo; Mark Tabb	Anthony President; Babyface; Brainz Dimilo	4:06
6.	"U Know What's Up" (Donell Jones)	Edward Ferrell II; Darren Lighty; Cliff Lighty; Balewa Muhammad; Veronica McKenzie; Anthony Hamilton	DJ Eddie F; Darren Lighty	4:02
7.	"Move It Slow" (Kevon Edmonds)	Lashone Fletcher; Joseph Hearns	Christopher Troy; Zack Harmon	5:07
8.	"Murder She Wrote" (Chaka Demus & Pliers)	Lowell Fillmore Dunbar; Everton Bonner; John Christopher Taylor; Lloyd Willis	Sly and Robbie	4:07
9.	"Breathe and Stop" (Q-Tip)	Kamaal Fareed; James Yancey; Robert Bell; George "Funky" Brown; Roy Handy; Robert Mickens; Gene Redd Jr.; Claydes Charles Smith; Dennis Thomas; Richard Westfield	Jay Dee	4:06
10.	"You Can Do It" (Ice Cube, Mack 10, and Ms. Toi)	O'Shea Jackson; Dedrick Rolison; Don Saunders; Arthur Baker; Robert Allen; John B. Miller; Ellis Williams; John Robie; Lance Taylor	One Eye	4:22
11.	"My Window" (Soulbone)	Darryl Anthony; Eric Jackson; Diddamo	Darryl Anthony Hawes	5:00
12.	"Only You" (112 and Notorious B.I.G.)	Sean Combs; Christopher Wallace; Marvin Scandrick; Michael Keith; Quinnes Parker; Daron Jones; Steven Jordan; D.J. Rogers; Harry Wayne Casey; Richard Finch	Puff Daddy; Stevie J	4:19
13.	"Get It On Tonite" (Montell Jordan)	Montell Jordan; Jörg Evers; Jürgen S. Korduletsch; Darren Benbow; Antoine Wilson; Brian Palmer	Brian "Lilz" Palmer; Sergio 'PLX' Moore	4:36
14.	"All or Nothing" (Athena Cage)	John Rhone; Ontario Haynes	The Whole 9	3:45
Total length:				59:27

Notes

- The track "Breathe and Stop" (#9) is omitted in many versions of the album and replaced with the bonus track "Shining Through (Theme from Save the Last Dance) (Soulshock and Karlin Remix)" (#14).
- "Only You" contains a sample from "I Get Lifted", performed by KC and the Sunshine Band.
- "Get It On Tonite" contains a sample from "Love for the Sake of Love", performed by Claudja Barry.

== Awards and nominations ==
Year	Nominee / work	Award	Result	Ref.
2002	Save the Last Dance	American Music Award for Favorite Soundtrack	Won	

== Charts and certifications ==
=== Weekly charts ===
Chart (2001)	Peak position
Australian Albums (ARIA)	4
Austrian Albums (Ö3 Austria)	20
Belgian Albums (Ultratop Flanders)	8
Belgian Albums (Ultratop Wallonia)	8
Canadian Albums (Billboard)	2
Dutch Albums (Album Top 100)	20
Finnish Albums (Suomen virallinen lista)	13
French Albums (SNEP)	17
German Albums (Offizielle Top 100)	4
Hungarian Albums (MAHASZ)	28
New Zealand Albums (RMNZ)	5
Swiss Albums (Schweizer Hitparade)	5
US Billboard 200	3
US Top R&B/Hip-Hop Albums (Billboard)	2
US Top Soundtracks (Billboard)	6

=== Year-end charts ===
2001 year-end chart performance for Save the Last Dance
Chart (2001)	Position
Australian Albums (ARIA)	48
Canadian Albums (Nielsen SoundScan)	15
Canadian R&B Albums (Nielsen SoundScan)	6
German Albums (Offizielle Top 100)	54
Swiss Albums (Schweizer Hitparade)	40
US Billboard 200	33
US Top R&B/Hip-Hop Albums (Billboard)	47

2002 year-end chart performance for Save the Last Dance
Chart (2002)	Position
Canadian R&B Albums (Nielsen SoundScan)	38

=== Certifications ===
Region	Certification	Certified units/sales
Australia (ARIA)	Gold	35,000^{^}
Canada (Music Canada)	Platinum	100,000^{^}
United Kingdom (BPI)	Platinum	300,000^{*}
United States (RIAA)	2× Platinum	2,000,000^{^}
^{*} Sales figures based on certification alone.^{^} Shipments figures based on certification alone.

== More Music from the Motion Picture Save the Last Dance ==
More Music from the Motion Picture Save the Last Dance

Soundtrack album by various artists
- Released: May 22, 2001
- Genres: Hip hop; contemporary R&B
- Length: 44:09
- Label: Hollywood
- Producers: Mitchell Lieb (exec.); Robert W. Cort (exec.); Thomas Carter (exec.); Rockwilder; Shawty Redd

More Music from the Motion Picture Save the Last Dance is the second soundtrack album to Thomas Carter's 2001 dance film Save the Last Dance. It was released on May 22, 2001 through Hollywood Records and consisted of hip hop and contemporary R&B music. It features contributions from Angela Ammons, Audrey Martells, Blaqout, Fatman Scoop, Jesse Powell, J.R. Young, Medina Green, Method Man, Redman, Shawty Redd, Sy Smith, Ta-Gana and the World Beaters. The album peaked at number 129 on the Billboard 200.

== Track listing ==
No.	Title	Writer(s)	Producer(s)	Length
1.	"Da Rockwilder" (performed by Method Man & Redman)	Clifford Smith; Reggie Noble; Dana Stinson; Louis Freese; Brett Bouldin; Larry Muggerud; Eugene Dixon; Earl Edwards; Bernice Williams	Rockwilder	2:20
2.	"Let's Get Crunk" (performed by Shawty Redd)	Demetrius Lee Stewart	Shawty Redd	4:04
3.	"So Special" (performed by The Worldbeaters)	George Acogny; Darryl Phinnessee; Kamil Rustam; Jessie Willard III		3:45
4.	"Hate the Playaz" (performed by Audrey Martells)	Brian Kierulf; Joshua Schwartz; Nathan Butler		3:35
5.	"Dance Floor" (performed by Ta-Gana)	Tyler Collins; Chico Bennett; Boi		4:26
6.	"I Can Tell" (performed by Jesse Powell)	Darryl Young; John Sebastian; Kenny Kornegay; Sam Salter; Steve Boone; Thabiso Nkhereanye		4:40
7.	"When It Doesn't Matter" (performed by Angela Ammons)	Angela Ammons; Gen Rubin		3:30
8.	"Do Things" (performed by Sy Smith)	Syretha Olivia Smith-Peterson; James Poyser; Vikter Duplaix		4:26
9.	"Where Ya At" (performed by Fatman Scoop)	Isaac Freeman III; Anthony President; Brainz Dimilo		2:09
10.	"Bust Off" (performed by Medina Green)	Dante Smith; W. Johnson; D. Smith		3:22
11.	"You Don't Really Want Some" (performed by Blaqout)	Anthony President; Brainz Dimilo; Carlos Corte; Ronnie DeVoe; Ruben Cruz		2:31
12.	"Bounce" (performed by J.R. Young)	Anthony President; Brainz Dimilo; Carlos Corte; Ronnie DeVoe; Ruben Cruz		2:33
13.	"In for Cream" (performed by Blaqout)	Anthony President; Brainz Dimilo; Carlos Corte; Ronnie DeVoe; Ruben Cruz		2:48
Total length:				44:09

== Charts ==
Chart (2001)	Peak position
Swiss Albums (Schweizer Hitparade)	20
US Billboard 200	129
US Top Soundtracks (Billboard)	13
