= 2000 Soul Train Music Awards =

Music awards ceremony in Los Angeles, US

Soul Train Music Awards
- Date: March 4, 2000
- Location: Shrine Auditorium, Los Angeles, California
- Country: United States
- Hosted by: Tamia, Lisa "Left-Eye Lopes, Shemar Moore and Eric Benét
- First award: 1987

Highlights
- Most awards: Mary J. Blige and TLC (2)
- Website: soultrain.com

Television/radio coverage
- Network: WGN America

The 2000 Soul Train Music Awards were held on March 4, 2000 at the Shrine Auditorium in Los Angeles, California. The show honored the best in R&B, soul, rap, jazz, and gospel music from the previous year. The show was hosted by Eric Benét, Lisa "Left Eye" Lopes, Tamia and Shemar Moore.

== Special awards ==
=== Artist of the Decade for Extraordinary Artistic Achievements – Male ===
- Prince

=== Artist of the Decade for Extraordinary Artistic Achievements – Female ===
- Whitney Houston

=== Sammy Davis Jr. Award for Entertainer of the Year – Male ===
- DMX

=== Sammy Davis Jr. Award for Entertainer of the Year – Female ===
- Mary J. Blige

== Winners and nominees ==
Winners are in bold text.

=== R&B/Soul or Rap Album of the Year ===
- **R.Kelly – R.**
  - Mary J Blige – Mary
  - DMX – Flesh of My Flesh, Blood of My Blood
  - TLC – Fanmail

=== Best R&B/Soul Album – Male ===
- **Ginuwine – 100% Ginuwine**
  - Eric Benét – A Day in the Life
  - Donell Jones – Where I Wanna Be
  - Brian McKnight – Back at One

=== Best R&B/Soul Album – Female ===
- **Mary J. Blige – Mary**
  - Macy Gray – On How Life Is
  - Whitney Houston – My Love Is Your Love
  - Jennifer Lopez – On the 6

=== Best R&B/Soul Album – Group, Band, or Duo ===
- **TLC – FanMail**
  - Destiny's Child – The Writing's on the Wall
  - K-Ci & JoJo – It's Real
  - Les Nubians – Princesses Nubiennes

=== Best R&B/Soul Single – Male ===
- **Maxwell – "Fortunate"**
  - Ginuwine – "So Anxious"
  - Donell Jones – "U Know What's Up"
  - Brian McKnight – "Back at One"

=== Best R&B/Soul Single – Female ===
- **Lauryn Hill – "Ex-Factor"**
  - Mariah Carey (featuring Jay Z) – "Heartbreaker"
  - Whitney Houston – "My Love Is Your Love"
  - Chanté Moore – "Chanté's Got a Man"

=== Best R&B/Soul Single – Group, Band, or Duo ===
- **TLC – "No Scrubs"**
  - Destiny's Child – "Bills, Bills, Bills"
  - Dru Hill – "Beauty"
  - Ideal – "Get Gone"

=== The Michael Jackson Award for Best R&B/Soul or Rap Music Video ===
- **Busta Rhymes (featuring Janet Jackson) – "What's It Gonna Be?!"**
  - Missy Elliott (featuring Nas, Eve and Lil' Mo) – "Hot Boyz"
  - Q-Tip – "Vivrant Thing"
  - Will Smith – "Will 2K"

=== Best R&B/Soul or Rap New Artist ===
- **Juvenile**
  - Eve
  - Ideal
  - Angie Stone

=== Best Gospel Album ===
- **Dottie Peoples – God Can & God Will**
  - Dorothy Norwood – The Lord is a Wonder
  - Richard Smallwood – Healing: Live in Detroit
  - Vickie Winans – Live in Detroit, Vol. 2

== Performers ==
- Sisqo – "Thong Song"
- Destiny's Child – "Say My Name"
- Q-Tip – "Vivrant Thing"
- Juvenile, Mannie Fresh, Lil Wayne and B.G.
- Mary J. Blige – "Your Child"
- Donell Jones and Lisa "Left Eye" Lopes – "U Know What's Up"
- Blaque – "Bring It All to Me"
- Ginuwine – "So Anxious"
- Eric Benét and Tamia – "Spend My Life with You"
- DMX – "What's My Name?"
- Lil' Kim

== Presenters ==
- Sinbad, Garcelle Beauvais and Evander Holyfield - Presented Best R&B/Soul or Rap New Artist
- Whitney Houston - Presented Sammy Davis Jr. Award for Entertainer of the Year – Female
- Montell Jordan, Les Nubians and Kobe Bryant - Presented Best R&B/Soul Single - Group, Band or Duo
- Goodie Mob, Vickie Winans and Tangi Miller - Presented Best R&B/Soul Album - Group, Band or Duo
- Michael Clarke Duncan and Solé - Presented Best R&B/Soul Single - Male
- Kelly Price, Bone Thugs-n-Harmony and Chanté Moore - Presented The Michael Jackson Award for Best R&B/Soul or Rap Music Video
- Vivica A. Fox and Russell Simmons - Presented Sammy Davis Jr. Award for Entertainer of the Year – Male
- LL Cool J, Rachel Stuart and Master P - Presented Best R&B/Soul Album - Female
- K-Ci & JoJo, Tyrese, and Eve - Presented Best Gospel Album
- Warren G, Missy Elliott, Ideal - Presented R&B/Soul or Rap Album of the Year
- IMx, Lynnette Cole and Angie Stone - Presented Best R&B/Soul Album - Male
- Raphael Saadiq - Presented Artist of the Decade for Extraordinary Artistic Achievements – Female
- Chuck D - Presented Artist of the Decade for Extraordinary Artistic Achievements – Male
- Busta Rhymes, Rah Digga and Case - Presented Best R&B/Soul Single - Female
