= Life Goes On (Donell Jones album) =

Studio album by Donell Jones
- Released: June 4, 2002
- Length: 51:52
- Labels: LaFace; Arista
- Producers: Donell Jones; Eddie F.; Chris Absolam; Sheldon Goode; Jamie Hawkins; Darren Lighty; Richard Smith; Teflon

Donell Jones chronology
Where I Wanna Be (1999)	Life Goes On (2002)	Journey of a Gemini (2006)

Singles from My Heart
- 1. "You Know That I Love You" Released: April 9, 2002

Life Goes On is the third studio album by American R&B singer Donell Jones. It was released by LaFace Records and Arista Records on June 4, 2002, in the United States. The album featured two singles, "You Know that I Love You", which was a minor hit in both the US and the UK and "Put Me Down", a more popular non-album version featuring Styles P and Lady May. The album reached number 3 on the US Billboard 200 and went gold. On September 16, 2003, Arista Records re-released Life Goes On with the bonus track, "I'll Go", which first appeared on the Love & Basketball soundtrack.

== Critical reception ==
Professional ratings
Review scores
Source	Rating
AllMusic	4/5 stars
Entertainment Weekly	B+

AllMusic editor Stephen Thomas Erlewine rated the album four out of five stars. He called the project another "consistently satisfying" effort within Jones' discography and added: "Jones may not be as flashy as some of his modern soul peers [...] but that's what makes his records work, and what makes Life Goes On another fine addition to his catalog." Craig Seymour from Entertainment Weekly noted that the album "uses fluid '80s grooves for tales of straying lovers, reformed commitment-phobes, and incarcerated romantics. With his tenderly earnest young-Stevie Wonder-like delivery and consistently sharp lyrics, Jones hits the right notes." Rolling Stone's Adrian Zupp found that "the mostly laid back grooves and oh-so-romantic lyric turns make this definite mood music, and it works – as long as your mood is pretty fixed [...] The guy has genuine vocal range and power and a craftsman's instinct for creating an appealing vibe. Whether Life Goes On tops Jones' platinum-plus sophomore disc, Where I Wanna Be, is for the people to decide. But everything on his latest CD suggests that, artistically at least, he's still on the way up."

== Chart performance ==
Life Goes On debuted and peaked at number three on the US Billboard 200 in the week of June 13, 2002, with first week sales of 110,000 units. It marked Jones' first top ten album in the United States as well as his biggest sales week yet. The album also reached number two on the Top R&B/Hip-Hop Albums chart. On January 11, 2006, Life Goes On was certified Gold by the Recording Industry Association of America (RIAA). By May 2006, the album had sold 610,000 copies in the US.

== Track listing ==
Life Goes On track listing
No.	Title	Writer(s)	Producer	Length
1.	"Still"	Jamie Hawkins; Chris Absolam; Richard Smith	Hawkins; Absolam; Smith	3:50
2.	"Put Me Down"	Edward Ferrell; Darren Lighty; Clifton Lighty; Balewa Muhammad; Keir Gist; Jamie Wilson	Eddie F.; D. Lighty	4:20
3.	"You Know that I Love You"	Hawkins; Absolam; Smith	Hawkins; Absolam; Smith	4:20
4.	"Where You Are (Is Where I Wanna Be) (Part 2)"	Donell Jones; Kyle West	Jones; West^{[a]}	3:49
5.	"Do U Wanna"	Donell Jones; West	Jones; West^{[a]}	4:36
6.	"Life Goes On"	Jones	Jones	4:36
7.	"Freakin' U"	Jones; C. Lighty; Sheldon Harris	Teflon; Jones^{[a]}	3:44
8.	"Gotta Get Her (Outta My Head)"	Ferrell; D. Lighty; C. Lighty; Muhammad; Gist; Wilson	Eddie F.; D. Lighty	4:11
9.	"Guilty by Suspicion"	Jones	Jones	4:32
10.	"Don't Leave"	Jones; Gregory Silver	Jones; Sheldon Goode^{[a]}	3:47
11.	"Comeback"	Jones	Jones; Goode	4:41
12.	"I Hope It's You"	Jones	Jones	5:23
13.	"Girl's Friend"	Ferrell; D. Lighty; C. Lighty; Muhammad; Delvis Damon	Eddie F.; D. Lighty	4:17
Total length:				51:52

Notes

- ^a signifies a co-producer

== Charts ==
=== Weekly charts ===
Weekly chart performance for Life Goes On
Chart (2002)	Peak position
French Albums (SNEP)	85
UK Albums (Official Charts)	62
US Billboard 200	3
US Top R&B/Hip-Hop Albums (Billboard)	2

=== Year-end charts ===
2002 year-end chart performance for Life Goes On
Chart (2002)	Position
Canadian R&B Albums (SoundScan)	171
US Billboard 200	155
US Top R&B/Hip-Hop Albums (Billboard)	30

== Certifications ==
Certifications for Life Goes On
Region	Certification	Certified units/sales
United Kingdom (BPI)	Silver	60,000^{*}
United States (RIAA)	Gold	500,000^{^}
^{*} Sales figures based on certification alone.^{^} Shipments figures based on certification alone.
