= Stressin =

Stressin may refer to:

- "Stressin", a song by Celly Cel from the album Deep Conversation
- "Stressin", a song by C-Murder from the album The Truest Shit I Ever Said
- "Stressin", a song by Donell Jones from the album The Lost Files
- "Stressin", a song by King Gizzard & the Lizard Wizard from the album Oddments
