= I'm Gonna Be =

I'm Gonna Be may refer to:

- "I'm Gonna Be (500 Miles)", a 1988 song by The Proclaimers
- "I'm Gonna Be" (Donell Jones song), 2006
- "I'm Gonna Be", a 2019 song by Post Malone from Hollywood's Bleeding
