= Hope You Do =

Promotional single by Chris Brown

from the album Heartbreak on a Full Moon
- Released: October 27, 2017
- Recorded: 2016
- Studio: Paramount Studios, Los Angeles
- Genre: Alternative R&B
- Length: 4:41
- Label: RCA; CBE
- Songwriter(s): Chris Brown; Prince Chrishan
- Producer(s): ISM; A1

Music video
- "Hope You Do" on YouTube

"Hope You Do" is a song by American singer Chris Brown, from his eighth studio album Heartbreak on a Full Moon. "Hope You Do" was released on October 27, 2017, as a promotional single by RCA Records, along with the songs "Only 4 Me" and "Pull Up". The song was certified Gold by the Recording Industry Association of America (RIAA).

== Composition and lyrics ==
"Hope You Do" is a trap-influenced, alternative R&B slow-jam, featuring a "yearning croon" from Brown. It contains an interpolation of the 2000 song "Where I Wanna Be" by Donell Jones, while the instrumental includes a vocal sample of Jacquees' 2014 track "Come Thru". The song's lyrics feature Brown reflecting on a lover and how drunk he is on a late night. According to HotNewHipHop "Brown takes on the role of hopelessly infatuated drinker on this song, his vocal delivery seemingly melting straight into the moody instrumental (...) There's a sense of foreboding from the singer on this track, as if he knows that success in courting the woman he's had his eye on might be a tall order, but the liquid encouragement seems to be going a long way".

== Music video ==
The music video for "Hope You Do" was directed by Chris Brown with Daniel CZ and released on June 6, 2018 on his YouTube channel. Brown is seen in a long trench coat and a fedora. He shows off his "signature" dance moves and reflects on a lover during a late night out while going through alleys, tunnels, and stairways with backup dancers by his side in a black-and-white world. The video was praised for its vintage black-and-white visuals and its choreography.

== Charts ==
Chart performance for "Hope You Do"
Chart (2017)	Peak position
US Hot R&B Songs (Billboard)	25

== Certifications ==
Certifications for "Hope You Do"
Region	Certification	Certified units/sales
New Zealand (RMNZ)	Gold	15,000^{‡}
United States (RIAA)	Platinum	1,000,000^{‡}
^{‡} Sales+streaming figures based on certification alone.
