= Lost Files =

Lost Files or The Lost Files may refer to:

- Lost Files (YoungBoy Never Broke Again album), 2022
- The Lost Files (Ski Mask the Slump God album), 2025
- The Lost Files (Digital Underground album), 1999
- The Lost Files (Donell Jones album), 2009
- The Lost Files (Torchwood), a series of radio dramas based on Torchwood, a British science fiction television series
- Lost Files, a 2006 album by Hiroki Kikuta
- Lost Files, a 2021 EP by Ken Carson
- "Lost Files", a song by Polo G from his 2019 album Die a Legend
