= Lyrics (Donell Jones album) =

Studio album by Donell Jones
- Released: September 28, 2010
- Length: 55:30
- Label: Candyman; eOne
- Producer: Donell Jones (also exec.); Mike City

Donell Jones chronology
The Lost Files (2009)	Lyrics (2010)	Forever (2013)

Singles from Lyrics
- 1. "Love Like This" Released: August 10, 2010

Lyrics is the fifth studio album by R&B singer Donell Jones. It released by Candyman Music, Jones's own label, through eOne Music on September 28, 2010 in the United States. The album marked his first release with the venture, following his departure from LaFace Records, and features production credits by Mike City and Jones himself. The album debuted at number 5 on the US Billboard Independent Albums chart and number 9 on Billboard's Top R&B/Hip-Hop Albums chart with almost 15,000 in sales. "Love Like This" was the album's lead single and reached the top of the US Adult R&B Songs chart.

== Critical reception ==
Professional ratings
Review scores
Source	Rating
About.com	3.5/5 stars
AllMusic	3.5/5 stars
PopMatters	6/10

AllMusic editor Andy Kellman rated the album three and a half ouf of five stars. He found that "the majority of it convincingly picks up where 2006's Journey of a Gemini left off. Jones has nothing to prove nor to lose, and that's the way this album sounds. He writes, plays, and produces most of the material and gets only a small amount of instrumental assistance. The probing "Imagine That" and "Blackmail," along with delicate-but-durable slow jams like "Love Like This" and "The Finer Things in Life," will be enough to please Jones' followers." Mark Edward Nero from About.com felt that the album "features Donell doing what he does best: creating sexy and romantic songs that can either tug on your heartstrings or have you heading to the bedroom. Or sometimes both. Although the album falters slightly on the songs that have more of a hip-hop attitude, this is a very solid release overall."

PopMatters critic Quentin B. huff noted: "As a producer, Jones does a strong job, making his songs layered but crisp. Inasmuch as Lyrics fits the current landscape, it stands high on the list production-wise. But it's nevertheless indistinguishable from the crowd [...] It would be great if he focused on the warmth and honesty of his vocal performances without the mediators of Auto-Tune and other effects. That, along his ability to convey sincerity and to develop intense psychological details, is a talent he should continue to hone." Natalie Shaw from BBC Music found that "Jones is clever and sleek enough to pull this album off. Through slamming slap bass, masterful slow-grind and clear-cut self-obsession, Lyrics is a unified hip hop-tinged RnB mainstay, familiar without the distasteful nostalgia, and heavy on infectious beats."

== Commercial performance ==
The album debuted at number 28 on the US Billboard 200, with first week sales of almost 15,000 units. It also number five on the US Billboard Independent Albums chart and number 9 on Billboard's Top R&B/Hip-Hop Albums.

== Track listing ==
All tracks are written by Donell Jones (unless otherwise noted).

Lyrics track listing
No.	Title	Writer(s)	Producer	Length
1.	"The World is Yours"		Donell Jones	3:58
2.	"Your Place"		Donell Jones	5:01
3.	"Love Like This"		Donell Jones	3:37
4.	"Imagine That"		Donell Jones	4:53
5.	"Backdoor"		Donell Jones	3:47
6.	"Blackmail"		Donell Jones	4:15
7.	"All About the Sex"		Donell Jones	5:36
8.	"Stripclub" (featuring Yung Joc)		Donell Jones	4:22
9.	"What's Next" (featuring Inessa)		Donell Jones	3:43
10.	"You Can Burn" (performed by Breese)		Donell Jones	3:30
11.	"The Finer Things in Life"	Mike City	Mike City	4:05
12.	"Just a Little"		Donell Jones	4:49
13.	"O How I Wonder"		Donell Jones	3:49
Total length:				55:19

Best Buy bonus tracks
No.	Title	Producer	Length
14.	"All About the Sex" (Acoustic Mix)	Donell Jones	5:36
15.	"Ménage à Troi"	Donell Jones	4:23
16.	"Don't Trip"	Donell Jones	3:31

== Charts ==
Weekly chart performance for Lyrics
Chart (2010)	Peak position
US Billboard 200	28
US Top R&B/Hip-Hop Albums (Billboard)	9
