= Better Start Talking =

Single by Donell Jones featuring Jermaine Dupri

from the album Journey of a Gemini
- Released: October 18, 2005
- Recorded: 2005
- Genre: R&B
- Length: 4:12
- Label: LaFace
- Songwriter(s): Donell Jones; Ryan Leslie; Sean Garrett
- Producer(s): Ryan Leslie; Sean Garrett

Donell Jones singles chronology
"Do U Wanna" (2003)	"Better Start Talking" (2005)	"I'm Gonna Be" (2006)

"Better Start Talking" is a song by American singer Donell Jones. It was written by Jones along with Ryan Leslie and Sean Garrett for his fourth studio album Journey of a Gemini (2006), while production was helmed by Leslie and Garrett. The song served as the first single from the album and reached number 72 on the Hot R&B/Hip-Hop Songs chart.

== Track listings ==
CD single
No.	Title	Length
1.	"Better Start Talking" (Clean)	4:18
2.	"Better Start Talking" (Main)	4:18
3.	"Better Start Talking" (Instrumental)	4:14

== Credits and personnel ==
- Chris Athens – mastering
- Blake Eiseman – recording
- Sean Garrett – producer, writer
- Donell Jones – vocals, writer
- Ryan Leslie – producer, writer
- Carlton Lynn – recording
- Pat Vialla – mixing

== Charts ==
Chart (2006)	Peak position
US Hot R&B/Hip-Hop Songs (Billboard)	72
