= Where I Wanna Be (Donell Jones song) =

Single by Donell Jones

from the album Where I Wanna Be
- Released: June 20, 2000
- Recorded: 1999
- Genre: R&B
- Length: 4:13
- Label: LaFace; Arista
- Songwriter(s): Donell Jones; Kyle West
- Producer(s): Donell Jones; Kyle West

Donell Jones singles chronology
"This Luv" (2000)	"Where I Wanna Be" (2000)	"You Know That I Love You" (2002)

"Where I Wanna Be" is a song by American R&B singer Donell Jones. It was written and produced by Jones and Kyle West for his same-titled second album (1999). Released as the album's fourth and final single, the song charted at number Twenty nine on the US Billboard Hot 100 chart and number two on the Hot R&B/Hip-Hop Songs, marking his second top five hit on the latter chart. A sequel to the song titled "Where You Are (Is Where I Wanna Be) (Part 2)" appeared on Jones' next album Life Goes On in 2002. The track has significantly influenced the R&B genre, evident in its widespread sampling by prominent artists. Notably, in 2017, singer Mariah Carey incorporated elements of the song into her single "I Don't", featuring rapper YG.

== Track listings ==
CD single

1. "Where I Wanna Be" (Album Version)
2. "Where I Wanna Be" (Instrumental)
3. "Where I Wanna Be" (Call Out Hook)

12" single

1. "Where I Wanna Be" (Album Version)
2. "This Luv" (Album Version)
3. "Where I Wanna Be" (Instrumental)
4. "Where I Wanna Be" (Acapella)

== Charts ==
=== Weekly charts ===
Chart (2000)	Peak position
US Billboard Hot 100	29
US Hot R&B/Hip-Hop Songs (Billboard)	2

=== Year-end charts ===
Chart (2000)	Position
US Billboard Hot 100	81
US Hot R&B/Hip-Hop Songs (Billboard)	10

== Samplings ==
In 2010, J. Cole sampled a snippet of the chorus into "Love Me Not" on his mixtape Friday Night Lights.

In 2016, the instrumental was sampled in "LSD" by Jamila Woods featuring Chance the Rapper off her album "Heavn".

The following year in 2017, Mariah Carey released the single "I Don't" featuring rapper YG, which sampled and interpolated multiple elements from "Where I Wanna Be".

That same year, Chris Brown sampled the melody of the chorus on his song "Hope You Do" a track of his studio album "Heartbreak on a Full Moon".

In 2021, singer Tone Stith interpolated the chorus for his song "When You Love Someone", featuring H.E.R.
