= Love It (song) =

2001 single by Bilal

Single by Bilal

from the album 1st Born Second
- Released: January 2001
- Length: 3:48
- Label: Interscope Records
- Songwriter(s): Michael Flowers
- Producer(s): Mike City

Bilal singles chronology
"Soul Sista" (2000)	"Love It" (2001)	"Fast Lane" (2001)

"Love It" is a song by American singer-songwriter Bilal, from the album 1st Born Second. The song was released as the second single from the album in 2001 and reached No. 61 on the Billboard R&B singles chart.

== Track listing ==
US CD single

No.	Title	Length
1.	"Love It" (LP version)	3:48
2.	"Love It" (acapella)	3:47
3.	"Love It" (instrumental)	3:48
4.	"Fast Lane, All That I Am, Sometimes" (album snippets)

== Charts ==
Chart (2001)	Peak position
US Billboard Hot R&B/Hip-Hop Singles & Tracks	61
