= 1st Born Second =

Studio album by Bilal
- Released: July 27, 2001
- Recorded: c. 1999–2000
- Studio: Electric Lady (New York)
- Genres: Neo soul; R&B
- Length: 75:55
- Label: Interscope
- Producers: Bilal; Mike City; Aaron Comess; Dahoud Darien; Megahertz; Dr. Dre; Dre & Vidal; J Dilla; Andres Levin; James Poyser; Raphael Saadiq

Bilal chronology
1st Born Second (2001)	Love for Sale (unreleased)

1st Born Second is the debut album by the American singer-songwriter Bilal, released on July 27, 2001, by Interscope Records. Bilal recorded the album at Electric Lady Studios in New York with a host of record producers, including Aaron Comess, Dr. Dre, Mike City, Megahertz, Raphael Saadiq, and J Dilla. It was a critical success and charted at number 31 on the U.S. Billboard 200, eventually selling 319,000 copies. According to AllMusic biographer Andy Kellman, the album was an "exemplary" release of the retro-inspired neo soul genre, although Bilal's subsequent work would become increasingly distinctive and modern.

== Background ==
Bilal developed an interest in singing while growing up in the Germantown area of Philadelphia, where he participated in a church choir at the behest of his Baptist mother. On occasional trips to the city's jazz clubs with his father, he witnessed the working habits and lifestyles of musicians, which inspired him to pursue music seriously. Starting as a vocal student at the Philadelphia High School for the Creative and Performing Arts, Bilal advanced to studying the music theory and language shared by the instrumentalist students so he could socialize with them.

In 1999, Bilal went to New York City to train at the New School for Jazz and Contemporary Music, where he developed a reputation among his peers for challenging their musical sensibilities. He also frequented the city's Wetlands Preserve nightclub and met members of the Soulquarians (including Common, The Roots, and Erykah Badu), a rotating collective of experimental black music artists who often collaborated on each other's recordings. A demo recorded with the musician Aaron Comess, who Bilal met at a jam session set up by New School professors, earned the singer a recording contract from Interscope Records and encouraged his exit from the school to concentrate on music professionally. His performance at a 1999 Prince tribute concert generated much buzz in the music industry.

== Recording and music ==
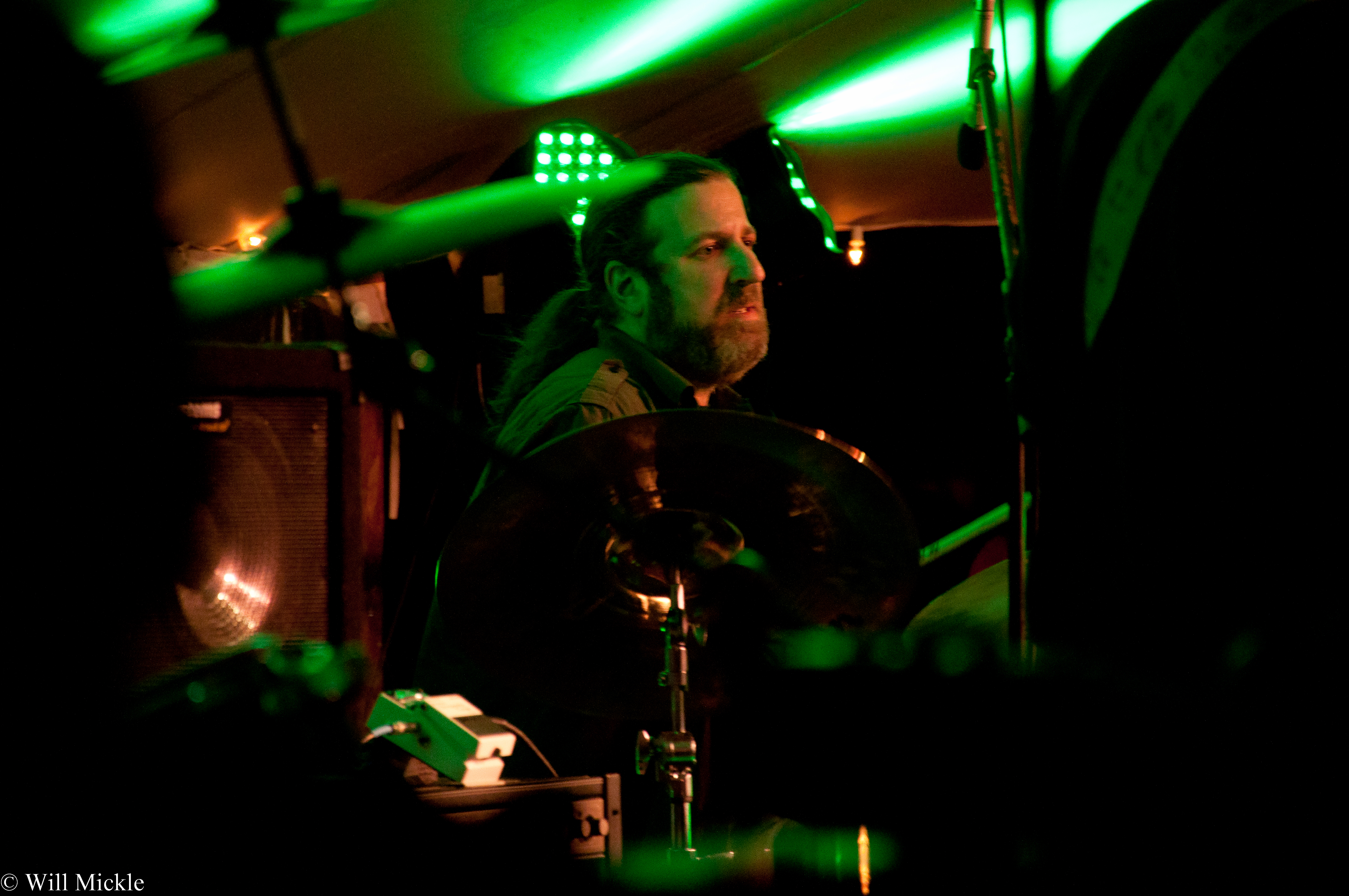
Aaron Comess in 2014

After signing to Interscope in 1999, Bilal wrote songs and improvised with a band at a warehouse in New Jersey in preparation for the album's recording, which took place at Electric Lady Studios in New York around 1999 and 2000. In December 1999, while reviewing Bilal's Prince tribute performance at the Brooklyn Academy of Music, The Village Voice reported that the album was expected by Spring of next year. However, the release encountered delays as Interscope pressured the singer into collaborating with more popular record producers, including Dr. Dre and Soulquarians member J Dilla, who helped refine Bilal's stylistically varied and free-form approach into more structurally defined songs to the label's liking. This process extended the recording for approximately another year. Comess participated in the recording as a bassist, drummer, producer, and engineer. The Soulquarians also contributed production.

1st Born Second features an eclectic sound with elements of jazz, hip hop, scat, reggae, and rock music. According to Mark Anthony Neal, its title originates from the idea that Bilal is the "first born prodigal son of the second generation of contemporary soul stirrers", referring to the group of artists associated with the neo soul movement. The singer's name also serves as an acronym for "Beloved, Intelligent, Lustful and Livin' It".

== Critical reception ==
Professional ratings
Review scores
Source	Rating
AllMusic	4/5 stars
Blender	4/5 stars
Chicago Sun-Times	4/4 stars
Entertainment Weekly	A−
Los Angeles Times	3/4 stars
NME	8/10
Q	3/5 stars
Rolling Stone	3.5/5 stars
Spin	7/10
USA Today	4/4 stars

1st Born Second was met with widespread critical acclaim. At Metacritic, which assigns a normalised rating out of 100 to reviews from professional publications, the album has an average score of 82, based on 17 reviews.

The album received rave reviews from The Village Voice, Chicago Sun-Times, and USA Today, and it also received comparisons to the music of Marvin Gaye, Stevie Wonder, Sly & the Family Stone, Prince, and Curtis Mayfield. Reviewing for PopMatters, Neal hailed the album as "one of the most significant debuts in black pop during the past 25 years". Vibe's Tamika Andeson called it "one of the best R&B albums of the year". According to AllMusic's Andy Kellman, "at that point, the closest points of comparison were D'Angelo and Maxwell, yet Bilal was more dynamic than the former and less mannered than the latter. 1st Born Second carried an energy that neither one of those singers, as hot as they were at the time, could boast."

Some reviewers were less impressed. Spin magazine's Tony Green said that the album is musically expansive but lacking "that killer tune or two that would bring it all home, that one memorable melody that would make the album more than the sum of its incense 'n' dreads textures". In an essay accompanying the Pazz & Jop critics poll, in which 1st Born Second finished in the top 100, Robert Christgau named Bilal among the "profusion of R&B also-rans" that he hopes "will develop material nobody can deny".

== Track listing ==
Information is taken from the album's liner notes.

No.	Title	Writer(s)	Producer(s)	Length
1.	"Intro"	Dubble; Richie Rich	Bilal	1:47
2.	"For You"	Bilal Oliver	Megahertz	3:47
3.	"Fast Lane"	Oliver; Damu Mtume; Fa Mtume; Michael Flowers	Dr. Dre	4:37
4.	"Reminisce" (feat. Mos Def & Common)	Oliver; Dante Smith; James Yancey; Lonnie Lynn	J Dilla	4:35
5.	"All That I Am (Somethin' for the People)"	Oliver; Dahoud Darien; Lynn	Dahoud Darien	3:56
6.	"Sally"	Oliver; Ronald Shannon Jackson; Richard Serrell	Dr. Dre	3:41
7.	"Sometimes"	Ahmir Khalib Thompson; Oliver; James Poyser	James Poyser	7:12
8.	"Love It"	Flowers	Mike City	3:48
9.	"C'mere (Skit)"		Andres Levin	2:12
10.	"Soul Sista"	Oliver; James Mtume	Raphael Saadiq	5:21
11.	"When Will You Call"	Oliver	Aaron Comess	4:47
12.	"Queen of Sanity"	Oliver	Aaron Comess	5:21
13.	"Love Poems"	Oliver; Keisha Whatley	Aaron Comess	5:25
14.	"You Are"	Marsha Ambrosius; Natalie Stewart	Dre & Vidal	4:17
15.	"Home"	Oliver	Bilal	5:23
16.	"Slyde"	Oliver; Darien	Dahoud Darien	4:07
17.	"Second Child"	Oliver	Bilal	6:49

== Charts ==
Chart (2001)	Peak position
US Billboard 200	31
US Billboard Top R&B/Hip-Hop Albums	10

== Personnel ==
Credits are taken from AllMusic.

- Bilal – vocals, drums, clavier, producer
- Dr. Dre – producer
- Greg Burns – assistant engineer, mixing
- Larry Chatman – project coordinator
- Mike City – multi instruments, producer
- Aaron Comess – bass, drums, producer, engineer, mixing engineer
- Tom Coster, Jr. – keyboards
- Jim Danis – assistant engineer, mixing
- Dahoud Darien – producer
- Vidal Davis – producer, engineer
- Russell Elevado – mixing
- Mike Elizondo – guitar, keyboards
- Todd Farrell – assistant engineer
- Drew FitzGerald – art direction
- Serban Ghenea – guitar, mixing
- Robert Glasper – keyboards, keyboard accordion
- James Hurt – string arrangements
- Jay Dee – producer
- Gintas Janusonis - drums, percussion
- Andres Levin – engineer, mixing
- Steven Mandel – mixing
- Artemio Villeda Martín – executive producer
- Alan Mason – mixing
- Sid McCoy – narrator
- Mel-Man – keyboards, producer
- Peter Mokran – mixing engineer
- Mike Moreno – guitar
- Mos Def – rap
- Damu Mtume – executive producer
- Neil Pogue – mixing engineer
- James Poyser – organ, producer, Fender Rhodes
- Raphael Saadiq – producer
- Jon Smeltz – engineer
- Soulquarians – producer
- Mike Starr – guitar
- Kendal Stubbs – engineer
- John Tyree – assistant engineer, mixing
