= Love & Basketball (soundtrack) =

Music from the Motion Picture love & Basketball

Soundtrack album by various artists
- Released: April 18, 2000
- Recorded: 1999–2000
- Genre: R&B; hip hop
- Length: 52:24
- Label: Overbrook; Interscope
- Producer: Ali Shaheed Muhammad; Angie Stone; Jake and the Phatman; Raphael Saadiq; Spike Lee; Steve "Silk" Hurley; will.i.am

Singles from Music from the Motion Picture Love & Basketball
- 1. "Dance Tonight" Released: May 23, 2000; 2. "Soul Sista" Released: 2000; 3. "I'll Go" Released: April 2000 (US) February 2001 (UK)

Professional ratings
Review scores
Source	Rating
AllMusic	3/5 stars
Entertainment Weekly	B

Love and Basketball: Music From The Motion Picture is the soundtrack to Gina Prince-Bythewood's 2000 film Love & Basketball. It was released on April 18, 2000 through Overbrook Music/Interscope Records, and mostly consisted of contemporary R&B with some hip hop music. The soundtrack was a minor success, peaking at number 45 on the Billboard 200, number 15 on the Top R&B/Hip-Hop Albums and number 1 on the Independent Albums.

== Track listing ==
No.	Title	Writer(s)	Length
1.	"I'll Go" (performed by Donell Jones)	Rahsaan Patterson; Steve Hurley	4:01
2.	"It Takes Two" (performed by Rob Base and DJ E-Z Rock)	Robert Ginyard	5:01
3.	"Dance Tonight" (performed by Lucy Pearl)	Ali Shaheed Muhammad; Dawn Robinson; Raphael Saadiq	3:50
4.	"Complete Beloved" (performed by Black Eyed Peas and Les Nubians)	William Adams	4:19
5.	"I Like" (performed by Guy)	Timmy Gatling; Gene Griffin; Aaron Hall; Teddy Riley	4:48
6.	"Lyte as a Rock" (performed by MC Lyte)	Lana Moorer	3:32
7.	"Holding Back the Years" (performed by Angie Stone)	Mick Hucknall; Neil Moss	6:37
8.	"Love and Happiness" (performed by Al Green)	Al Green; Mabon Hodges	5:01
9.	"Soul Sista" (performed by Bilal)	James Mtume; Bilal Oliver; Raphael Saadiq	4:20
10.	"Sweet Thing" (performed by Rufus & Chaka Khan)	Tony Maiden; Yvette Stevens	3:16
11.	"I Want to Be Your Man" (performed by Roger Troutman)	Roger Troutman; Larry Troutman	4:09
12.	"Fool of Me" (performed by Meshell Ndegeocello)	Meshell Ndegeocello	3:30
Total length:			52:24

Notes

- The tracks "Our Destiny" performed by Hinda Hicks, "This Woman's Work" by Maxwell, "Candy Girl" by New Edition, "Making Love In The Rain" by Herb Alpert with Lisa Keith and Janet Jackson, and "I Go To Work" by Kool Moe Dee, all of which feature prominently in the movie, do not appear on the soundtrack. "This Woman's Work" by Maxwell is a cover of the song of the same name by Kate Bush. The film also features the hit song Just Got Paid by Johnny Kemp, which plays during the prom scene.

== Personnel ==
- Abdul Zhuri — guitar arrangement
- Ali Shaheed Muhammad — producer
- Andy Phillips — product management
- Angie Stone — arrangement, producer
- Bernie Grundman — mastering
- Bill Malina — engineering
- Bob Bowen — music coordinator
- Craig Bauer — engineering
- Dana Sano — executive producer
- Dave Pensado — mixing
- Dylan Dresdow — assistant engineering
- Jake & the Phatman — drum programming, producer
- Jamal Peoples — keyboard arrangement
- James Lassiter — executive producer
- James Mtume — vocal producer
- Jenny-Bea Englishman — backing vocals, string arrangement
- John Dukakis — executive producer
- Johnny Lee — art direction, design
- Kenny Seymour — keyboard & string arrangement
- Kim Hill — backing vocals
- Lori Silfen — music business affairs
- Mark Fraunfelder — assistant engineering
- Mark Kaufman — music clearance
- Melodee Sutton — music supervisor
- Michelle Lynn Forbes — assistant engineering
- Mitch Rotter — executive producer
- Neil Pogue — mixing
- Pilar McCurry — executive producer
- Raphael Saadiq — bass, string arrangement, producer
- Reginald Dozier — engineering
- Rob Chiarelli — mixing
- Sidney Baldwin — photography
- Spike Lee — producer
- Steve "Silk" Hurley — arrangement, engineering, mixing, programming, producer
- Steve Johnson — engineering
- The South Central Chamber Orchestra — orchestra
- Toby Emmerich — executive producer
- Tony Peluso — engineering
- Tony Prendatt — engineering
- William Adams — arrangement, engineering, producer
- Winterton Garvey — concertmaster

== Charts ==
Chart (2000)	Peak position
US Billboard 200	45
US Top R&B/Hip-Hop Albums (Billboard)	15
US Independent Albums (Billboard)	1
