= Forever (Donell Jones album) =

Album by Donell Jones

Studio album by Donell Jones
- Released: July 9, 2013
- Length: 47:47
- Label: eOne
- Producer: Eddie F; Donell Jones; Charles Pettaway; Richard Smith

Donell Jones chronology
Lyrics (2010)	Forever (2013)	100% Free (2021)

Forever is the sixth studio album by R&B singer Donell Jones. It was released on July 9, 2013, through eOne Music. The album debuted at number 20 on the US Billboard 200 with sales of 12,000 copies.

== Critical reception ==
Professional ratings
Review scores
Source	Rating
AllMusic	3.5/5 stars

AllMusic editor Andy Kellman rated the album three ouf of five stars. He found that "more should be made of Jones' versatility. Forever is even closer to being a one-man show than 2010's Lyrics, with Jones performing every instrument but guitar, and he gets only a little songwriting assistance (and no guest appearances from MCs)." Kellmann noted that while "apart from the surprisingly brash "Step the F*** Off" and the Michael Jackson tribute "I Miss the King," not much sticks out, but the album is consistently likeable, filled with comfortable, mid-wattage grooves, yearning ballads." Howard Dukes from SoulTracks found felt the album "features sensitivity and swagger. The latter still comes more naturally to Jones, even at age 40, and Forever's club anthems will be the record’s most memorable tunes. That pretty much captures the zeitgeist of the times."

== Chart performance ==
The album debuted at number 20 on the US Billboard 200 with first weeks sales of 12,000 copies. It also debuted at number eight on Billboard's Top R&B/Hip-Hop Albums chart, becoming his fifth consecutive album to reach the top ten.

== Track listing ==
Forever track listing
No.	Title	Writer(s)	Producer	Length
1.	"New Beginning"	Donell Jones	Jones	1:23
2.	"Forever"	Jones	Jones	3:46
3.	"Closer I Get to You" (featuring Alja KaMillion)	Jones; Charles Pettaway; Teena Marie; Allan McGrier	Jones; Pettaway	3:37
4.	"Beautiful"	Jones	Jones	4:12
5.	"Don't Blame Me"	Jones	Jones	5:08
6.	"You Know"	Jones; Alja Jackson; Pettaway	Jones; Pettaway	4:52
7.	"I Miss the King"	Jones	Jones	4:03
8.	"Sorry I Hurt You"	Jones	Jones	4:07
9.	"Ride This"	Jones; Eddie Ferrell	Jones; Eddie F	3:43
10.	"Step the Fuck Off"	Jones	Jones	3:40
11.	"I'm So Gone"	Jones; Richard Smith	Jones; Smith	4:18
12.	"A Mother's Love"	Jones	Jones	4:12
Total length:				47:47

== Charts ==
Weekly chart performance for Forever
Chart (2013)	Peak position
US Billboard 200	20
US Top R&B/Hip-Hop Albums (Billboard)	8
