= Fast Lane (Bilal song) =

Single by Bilal featuring Dr. Dre and Jadakiss

from the album 1st Born Second
- Released: 2001
- Recorded: 2000
- Genre: Neo soul; R&B; hip hop
- Length: 4:37
- Label: Interscope Records
- Songwriters: Bilal Oliver, Damu Mtume; Fa Mtume, Michael Flowers
- Producer: Dr. Dre

Bilal singles chronology
"Love It" (2001)	"Fast Lane" (2001)	"Restart" (2010)

Dr. Dre singles chronology
"Ain't Nuttin' But Music" (2001)	"Fast Life" (2001)	"Bad Intentions" (2001)

Jadakiss singles chronology
"Back 2 Life 2001" (2001)	"Fast Life (Remix)" (2001)	"We Gonna Make It" (2001)

"Fast Lane" was the third single released in 2001 by American R&B singer-songwriter Bilal, from his debut studio album, 1st Born Second. The song peaked at No. 41 on the Billboard R&B singles chart. The music video for the remix featuring Dr. Dre and Jadakiss was directed by Sanaa Hamri.

Rolling Stone ranked "Fast Lane" at 35th place of the "40 greatest Dr. Dre productions", highlighting "Dre's clean drums and eerie synths" that "underlined Bilal's haunted vocal about deprivation in the projects.

== Charts ==
Chart (2001)	Peak position
German R&B Singles	7
US Billboard Hot R&B/Hip-Hop Singles & Tracks	41
