= My Heart (Donell Jones album) =

Studio album by Donell Jones
- Released: June 4, 1996
- Studio: Various: Playground Studios (New Jersey); Quad Recording Studios; Axis Studios; D&D Studios; Platinum Island Studios (New York City, New York); The Hit Quarters (White Plains, New York)
- Length: 66:13
- Labels: LaFace; Arista
- Producers: Eddie F.; Donell Jones; Mookie; Marks Sparks; Kenny Tonge; Darin Whittington

Donell Jones chronology
My Heart (1996)	Where I Wanna Be (1999)

Singles from My Heart
- 1. "In the Hood" Released: 1996; 2. "Knocks Me Off My Feet" Released: 1996; 3. "You Should Know" Released: 1997

My Heart is the debut album by American R&B singer Donell Jones. It was released by LaFace Records and Arista Records on June 4, 1996, in the United States. After the dissolution of his group Porché, Jones turned to songwriting and production, writing songs for R&B group Jade from their 1994 second album Mind, Body & Song as well as co-writing for Usher's self-titled debut album in that same year. He signed a recording contract as a solo performer with LaFace under Untouchables Entertainment, a production company and record label founded by Heavy D. & The Boyz member Edward "Eddie F." Ferrell. Most of the album was produced by Jones with additional help from Ferrell's Untouchables Entertainment production team. The album featured three singles, including "In the Hood", "Knocks Me Off My Feet" and "You Should Know".

== Critical reception ==
Professional ratings
Review scores
Source	Rating
AllMusic	4/5 stars

In a retrospective review, AllMusic editor Jason Birchmeier wrote: "Not only does Jones write the songs and sing them on his debut album; he also produces the album and programs both the drums and keyboards. Thus, comparisons to Wonder are somewhat inevitable, especially because Jones sings with a similarly soothing tone of voice. His later albums show him growing as an artist, but here you see Jones first blossoming." BBC Music critic Daryl Easlea called My Heart a "good if occasionally naïve collection of originals and covers that often sounds like juvenilia in comparison to this, his largely self-penned masterpiece".

== Track listing ==
My Heart track listing
No.	Title	Writer(s)	Producer	Length
1.	"In the Hood" (Playas Version)	Donell Jones; Gregory Tobar; Paul Richardson	Jones	4:22
2.	"Knocks Me Off My Feet"	Stevie Wonder	Darin Whittington	3:43
3.	"No Interruptions"	Jones	Jones	5:01
4.	"Waiting On You"	Jones; Edward Ferrell; Jonathan Morant	Eddie F.; Mookie	4:02
5.	"I Want You to Know"	Jones	Jones	4:33
6.	"My Heart"	Jones	Jones	3:39
7.	"Yearnin'"	Jones; Tobar	Jones	4:16
8.	"Wish You Were Here"	Tia Whittington; Darin Whittington	Darin Whittington	4:24
9.	"All About You"	Jones; Ferrell; Mark Sparks	Eddie F.; Sparks	4:44
10.	"You Should Know"	Jones; Ferrell; Morant	Eddie F.; Mookie	4:14
11.	"Natural Thang"	Jones	Jones	5:10
12.	"Believe in Me"	Jones; Felicia Adams; Kenny Tonge	Tonge	4:42
13.	"In the Hood" (Remix)	Donell Jones; Tobar; Richardson	Jones	5:01
14.	"Don't Cry"	Jones; Tonge	Donell Jones	4:25
15.	"The Only One You Need"	Jones; Ferrell; Morant	Eddie F.; Mookie	4:23

Sample credits

- "Waitin' on You" contains samples of "The Way We Were", as performed by Gladys Knight & the Pips and "Can It Be All So Simple", as performed by Wu-Tang Clan
- "All About You" contains a sample of "Summer Madness", as performed by Kool & the Gang
- "You Should Know" contains a sample of "Player's Anthem", as performed by Junior M.A.F.I.A.
- "In the Hood (Remix)" contains a sample of "Computer Love", as performed by Zapp
- "The Only One You Need" contains a sample of Shook Ones (Part II)", as performed by Mobb Deep

== Personnel ==
- Keyboards: Donell Jones, Eddie F., Darin Whittington, Mookie, Mark Sparks, Kenny Tonge
- Drum Programming: Donell Jones, Eddie F., Darin Whittington, Mookie, Mark Sparks, Kenny Tonge
- Trumpet: Joseph Morant
- Background vocals: Donell Jones, Shelene Thomas, Tia Whittington, Chico DeBarge, Patria, Erik Milteer
- Recording engineer: Scott Hollingsworth, Darin Whittington, Joe Quinde, Jason DeCosta, Kenny Ifill, Kenny Tonge
- Mixing: Scott Hollingsworth, Kenny Ortiz, Paul Logus, Rich Travali, Dave Daschinger, Chris Tergersun
- Executive producer: Edward "Eddie F." Ferrell, Antonio M. Reid, Kenneth B. Edmonds
- Mastering: Herb Powers at The Hit Factory
- Photography: John F. Cooper
- Art direction: D.L. Warfield
- Design: Ron Jaramillo

== Charts ==
=== Weekly charts ===
Weekly chart performance for My Heart
Chart (1996)	Peak position
UK Albums (Official Charts)	99
UK R&B Albums (Official Charts)	17
US Billboard 200	180
US Top R&B/Hip-Hop Albums (Billboard)	30

=== Year-end charts ===
Year-end chart performance for My Heart
Chart (1996)	Position
US Top R&B/Hip-Hop Albums (Billboard)	99
