= Princesses Nubiennes =

Princess Nubiennes

Studio album by Les Nubians
- Released: September 22, 1998
- Recorded: 1997–1998
- Studio: Soul II Soul, London
- Genre: R&B; neo soul; hip hop
- Length: 59:18
- Label: OmTown; Higher Octave; Virgin
- Producer: Dan Selene (exec.); Matt Marshall (exec.); Les Nubians (tracks 1, 4, 5, 9, 10, 14); Mounir Belkhir (track 1, 4, 5, 9); Lee Hamblin (tracks 2, 6, 7, 10, 11, 12, 15)

Les Nubians chronology
| Princess Nubiennes (1998) | One Step Forward (2003) |

Singles from Princesses Nubiennes
- 1. "Makeda" Released: 1998; 2. "Les Portes Du Souvenir" Released: 1999

Princesses Nubiennes is the debut studio album by Afro-French music duo Les Nubians, consisting of sisters Helene and Celia Faussart. Recorded in England, the record incorporates elements of diverse musical styles, including R&B, neo soul, jazz, electronic, hip hop, and West African music. The artists drew inspiration from the music they listened to growing up in Chad and France, as well as American singers such as Ella Fitzgerald and Louis Armstrong. The album's lyrics are almost entirely in French, and focus on themes of the African experience, nature, and international unity.

The album was first released in France in early 1998, selling poorly. However, the album became popular in the United States, selling almost 300,000 copies in its first year and close to 400,000 by 2003. Its success was driven in part by the popularity of lead single "Makeda", which peaked within the top 40 of the Billboard R&B chart and became the United States' first French-language hit in 25 years. Following its success in the US, the record began experiencing strong sales in France as well. The album drew favorable reviews from most music critics, who commended its production and lyrical themes, and went on to receive a nomination at the 2000 Soul Train Music Awards.

== Background ==
Sisters Helene and Celia Faussart, who went on to form Les Nubians, were born in Paris to a French father and a Cameroonian mother. They spent their early childhoods in Paris, before moving to Chad for seven years; while there, they became interested in the music of Africa & the diaspora. Celia experienced bullying at school for her African heritage and turned to jazz music as a creative outlet; Helene exposed her to artists such as Ella Fitzgerald and Louis Armstrong. After their father died, Celia moved in with Helene, and the two began singing together. Due to their young age and lack of formal training, they initially struggled to find musicians to perform with; some groups offered them the chance to sing backing vocals, but they refused. They ultimately formed an a capella group as well as an Afrocentric cultural collective called Les Nouveaux Griots. Les Nubians were co-founders of the collective; they selected their name in honor of Nubia, the first known Black civilization.

The duo recorded their debut album at the Soul II Soul studio in England, with the help of producer Lee Hamblin. They noted that, although they drew inspiration from American soul artists in writing the album, they didn't seek to simply adapt English-language R&B songs to French, and instead wanted to write songs that "sound good" in their native language. They initially signed with record label Virgin France, and were distributed in the US by Higher Octave Music, a smaller label in California, after executives heard the duo's performance in Japan.

== Composition ==
Stylistically, the album incorporates elements of jazz, contemporary R&B, jungle, hip hop, funk, roots, and soft pop. "Embrasse-Moi" and "Sourire" blend elements of breakbeat and West African music. A critic writing for Exclaim! posited that the album was "rootsy like Zap Mama" and drew funk influence from Soul II Soul; critic Robert Christgau concurred that both artists were influences on the album. A critic for Time compared the group's sound to that of Sade if she had been "reared in France by members of the Fugees". The openings of "Si Je T'Avais Ecoute" and "Les Portes Du Sovenir" feature grand pianos.

All but one of the songs on Princesses Nubiennes are sung in French. Following the success of "Makeda", they re-recorded the song in English, but most stations declined to play it, preferring the original, French-language version. The lyrics were noted for their delicate handling of controversial issues. "Si Je T'Avais Ecoute" discusses teenage abortion, with the sisters offering advice to a pregnant teen girl, while the album's sole English-language track, "Sugarcane", discusses the experiences of African slaves picking sugar cane in America as well as the modern-day legacy of slavery. The opening track, "Demain", imagines a world where oppressed people are liberated. "Makeda" and "Princesses Nubienne" have been interpreted as paying tribute to Black women. "Voyager" focuses on the theme of international unity, with lyrics that encourage everyone to act as a "citizen of Earth".

The album also includes a Gallic cover of the Sade song "Sweetest Taboo". The album also features a snippet of an interview with American jazz singer and civil rights activist Abbey Lincoln.

== Reception ==
=== Critical ===
Professional ratings
Review scores
| Source | Rating |
|---|---|
| AllMusic | 4/5 stars |
| Robert Christgau | C+ |

Considered by many to be their best work to date, Les Nubians released their debut album in 1999 to wide fanfare. Writing for Time that year, Christopher John Farley said of this album that it "blends smooth jazz, soft pop and warm R&B with a dash of dance in hip-hop" and that the album had an "emotional generosity and a spiritual depth" that came through on every track.

In The Village Voice, music critic Robert Christgau gave the album a letter grade of "C+", calling the artists "blander than the bass lines" and opining that the album is "'soul' if the '5th Annual Soul Train Lady of Soul Awards' says so".

=== Commercial ===
The album's initial target market was francophone nations including France, Belgium, and Canada. It struggled to gain traction in France, and the record sold poorly in that country upon its early 1998 release.

The duo hadn't initially expected the album to be successful in the United States, but after "Makeda" began to be picked up by college and R&B radio stations in the United States, the album experienced strong sales there. It debuted on the Heatseekers Albums chart in January 1999. By May 1999, with "Makeda" gaining airplay, the album had sold 140,000 units in the US; by October, the US sales figure was almost 300,000, and its US sales stood at nearly 400,000 by July 2003. It reached a peak of number 100 on the Billboard 200 and number 25 on the R&B/Hip-Hop Albums chart in the United States. It was the most successful French-language album to chart in the US in 16 years.

As the album's lead single, "Makeda" became the first French-language radio hit in 25 years, peaking within the top 50 on the Billboard R&B chart. Following their breakthrough in the United States, the album began experiencing strong sales in their native France as well. Listeners in England were also supportive, recognizing it as "fresh". In February 2000, the double-A-side "Tabou"/"Makeda" entered the UK Singles chart.

== Track listing ==
All tracks composed by Célia Faussart and Hélène Faussart except as noted.

1. De-main (Jazz) 3:50
2. Les Portes du Souvenir 4:58
3. Abbeylude (Interlude) (Mounir Belkhir, Faussart, Faussart) 0:28
4. Makeda (Mounir Belkhir, Faussart, Faussart) 4:53
5. Sourire (Mounir Belkhir, Faussart, Faussart) 2:36
6. Princess Nubienne (Souleymane Diamanka, Faussart, Faussart) 5:19
7. Tabou f. Casey (Sade Adu, Martin Ditcham) 4:28
8. Mystic (Interlude) 0:22
9. Embrasse-Moi (Mounir Belkhir, Princess Erika) 4:38
10. Sugar Cane (unknown) 4:36
11. Bebela 4:46
12. Si Je T'Avais Écouté 4:14
13. Hymne Nubien (Interlude) 1:11
14. Voyager 4:27
15. Désolée 8:32

== Charts ==
Weekly chart performance for Princesses Nubiennes
| Chart (1999) | Peak position |
|---|---|
| US Billboard 200 | 100 |
| US Top R&B/Hip-Hop Albums (Billboard) | 25 |
