= Soul Sista (song) =

Single by Bilal

from the album 1st Born Second and Music from the Motion Picture Love & Basketball
- Released: 2001
- Recorded: 1999
- Genre: Neo soul; R&B
- Length: 5:21
- Label: Interscope Records
- Songwriters: Bilal Oliver, Damu Mtume; Fa Mtume, Michael Flowers
- Producer: Raphael Saadiq

Bilal singles chronology
"The 6th Sense" (2000)	"Soul Sista" (2001)	"Love It" (2001)

"Soul Sista" is the debut single released in 2001 by American R&B/neo soul singer Bilal. The song was in support of his debut studio album, 1st Born Second released under Interscope Records. It also appeared on the soundtrack to Love & Basketball. The song was a top 20 R&B hit, peaking at No. 18 on the Billboard R&B Singles chart, as well as reaching No. 71 on the Hot 100.

== Track listing ==
US 5" CD

No.	Title	Length
1.	"Soul Sista" (LP version)	5:30
2.	"Soul Sista" (radio edit)	4:20
3.	"Soul Sista" (instrumental)	5:26
4.	"All That I Am, Love Poems, Sometimes" (album snippets)

== Charts ==
=== Weekly charts ===
Chart (2001)	Peak position
US Billboard Hot 100	71
US Hot R&B/Hip-Hop Songs (Billboard)	18

=== Year-end charts ===
Chart (2001)	Position
US Hot R&B/Hip-Hop Songs (Billboard)	72
