= Journey of a Gemini =

Studio album by Donell Jones
- Released: June 20, 2006
- Length: 63:53
- Label: LaFace; Jive
- Producer: Donell Jones; Noel Absolam; Mike City; Tha Cornaboyz; Sean Garrett; Ryan Leslie; Richard Smith; Tim & Bob; The Underdogs

Donell Jones chronology
Life Goes On (2002)	Journey of a Gemini (2006)	The Best of Donell Jones (2007)

Singles from Journey of a Gemini
- 1. "Better Start Talking" Released: October 18, 2005; 2. "I'm Gonna Be" Released: August 14, 2006; 3. "Ooh Na Na" Released: October 3, 2006

Journey of a Gemini is the fourth studio album by American singer Donell Jones. It was released by LaFace Records and Jive Records on June 20, 2006 in the United States. Pushed back numerous times due to record label complications of the Sony–BMG merger, the album was released to critical acclaim and became Jones' highest charting album on the Billboard Top R&B/Hip-Hop Albums chart where it topped at number one, while entering the top 20 on the Billboard 200 chart. The album was originally scheduled to be released December 20, 2005 under the title Where I Wanna Be: The Last Chapter, the sequel to his studio album Where I Wanna Be (1999), but was finally released in the summer of the following year.

== Critical reception ==
Professional ratings
Review scores
Source	Rating
About.com	4/5 stars
AllMusic	3.5/5 stars
Rolling Stone	3/5 stars
USA Today	2.5/4 stars
Vibe	3.5/5 stars

AllMusic editor Andy Kellman rated the album three and a half ouf of five stars. He found that Journey of a Gemini "doesn't quite maintain the steady level of consistency that his first three albums carried, it's nonetheless a satisfying addition to his catalog [...] Since the album's not as ballad-heavy, Jones is less prone to oversinging, and several excellent midtempo tracks — "Better Start Talking," "I'm Gonna Be," "Spend the Night," "Feelin' You," "Lust or Love" — should function equally well in clubs and living rooms. Just to show that he hasn't turned into a total square, there are plenty of nasty bedroom come-ons." Imani A. Dawson from Vibe called the album a "tender mood album that highlights Jones's rich, nuanced vocals" and noted it a "warm and comfortable world."

In his review for Rolling Stone, Peter Relic wrote that he Jones "knows to avoid excessive vocal histrionics and let his slow jams shine, but his switch-ups are hit-and-miss. "Better Start Talking" is a barely serviceable club track featuring Jermaine Dupri, but "If You Want Me," laced with snazzy organ and a PG-rated verse from Bun B, is as good as rapper-crooner collabos get. Then there's "Cry," where, atop a loop of Hall and Oates' "Sara Smile," Jones sheds tears over a preyed-upon girl." Okayplayer found that the album lacked a "narrative structure" and further wrote: "Underlying this loose story is a glossy but bass-heavy 'contemporary' sound that is welcoming if not exactly visionary. Without a doubt, Gemini lacks the sort of visceral punch that made recent albums by Legend, Anthony Hamilton, and Van Hunt so appealing. Nevertheless, Jones provides a solid, if rarely spectacular, collection of songs, compelling as much for their failures as for their successes.

== Chart performance ==
Journey of a Gemini debuted and peaked at number 15 on the US Billboard 200 in the week of June 28, 2006, with first week sales of 49,000 units. It also debuted at number one on the Top R&B/Hip-Hop Albums chart, becoming Jones's first album to do so.

== Track listing ==
Journey of a Gemini track listing
No.	Title	Writer(s)	Producer(s)	Length
1.	"Special Girl"	Donell Jones; Noel Absolam; Richard Smith	Jones; Absolam; Smith	4:41
2.	"Better Start Talking" (featuring Jermaine Dupri)	Jones; Ryan Leslie; Sean Garrett	Leslie; Garrett	4:12
3.	"I'm Gonna Be"	Jones; Tim Kelley; Bob Robinson	Tim & Bob	4:46
4.	"My Apology"	Jones; Absolam; Smith	Jones; Absolam; Smith	4:06
5.	"Spend the Night"	Jones; Michael Flowers	Mike City	4:20
6.	"Portrait of a Woman"	Jones; Absolam; Smith; Charles Pettaway	Jones; Absolam; Smith; Pettaway^{[a]}	4:33
7.	"Cry"	Jones; Absolam; Smith; Daryl Hall; John Oates	Jones; Absolam; Smith	4:02
8.	"Ooh Na Na"	Steven L. Russell; Antonio Dixon; Damon Thomas; Harvey Mason, Jr.; Durrell Babbs	The Underdogs	3:56
9.	"Feelin' You"	Jones; Kelley; Robinson; Alfred Weisberg-Roberts	Tim & Bob	4:20
10.	"Can't Wait"	Jones; Kelley; Robinson; Jak Bailey; Adam Brown	Tim & Bob	4:30
11.	"Lust or Love"	Jones; Flowers; Minnie Riperton; Richard J. Rudolph; Leon Ware	City	3:44
12.	"If U Want" (featuring Bun B)	Leslie; Garrett; Richard Marshall; James Freeman; Gary Spriggs	Leslie; Garrett; Kadis & Sean^{[a]}	4:44
13.	"Cuttin' Me Off"	Eric D. Dawkins; Dixon; Thomas; Mason, Jr.; Babbs	The Underdogs; Tank^{[a]}	3:52
14.	"Another Life"	Jones; Pettaway	Jones; Pettaway^{[a]}	3:31
15.	"I'm Gonna Be (Remix)" (featuring Clipse)	Jones; Kelley; Robinson; Terrence Thornton; Gene Thornton, Jr.	Tim & Bob	4:47
Total length:				63:53

International bonus track
No.	Title	Writer(s)	Producer(s)	Length
16.	"Hands on You"	Jones; Leslie; Garrett	Leslie; Garrett	4:01

US bonus tracks
No.	Title	Writer(s)	Producer(s)	Length
16.	"Baby It's You" (featuring Rico Love)	Dwayne Nesmith; Pierre Medor; Richard P. Butler, Jr.	Tha Cornaboyz	3:47
17.	"Apple Pie"	Jones; Absolam; Smith; Pettaway; Cassandra Lucas	Jones; Absolam; Smith	4:30

Notes

- ^a signifies a co-producer

Sample credits

- "Cry" samples "Sara Smile" by Hall & Oates.
- "Feelin' You" samples "Experience" by Daedelus.
- "Can't Wait" contains a sample from "Masquerade" by Ab.
- "Lust or Love" contains a portion of the composition entitled "Inside My Love" by Minnie Riperton.

== Unreleased material ==
In many interviews, Donell stated that he recorded 50 songs for the album. Some of those songs started to be leaked during the Summer/Fall period of 2004 due to Mixtape DJ's receiving those songs and putting them in their mixtapes. It was speculated that the album was pushed back numerous times due to the leaking of the songs onto the internet. But Donell stated, it was mainly because of the many complications of the Sony BMG merger that happened during the spring of 2004. Donell was a bit heated at first when he heard about the leaking on the internet but then said it was sign to his fans that he was working on a new album.

- "U Make Me Say" (Featuring Fat Joe) – 3:59
- "You Didn't Love Me" – 3:58
- "Do It All" – 2:26
- "Marry Me" – 2:32
- "Free" – 2:01
- "Azzville" – 3:13
- "September Love" – 4:06
- "Bad Girl" – 2:58
- "Sergeant Louise" – 3:54
- "U Make Me Say" (Heya Remix) (Featuring Ja Rule) – 3:59

== Charts ==
=== Weekly charts ===
Weekly chart performance for Journey of a Gemini
Chart (2006)	Peak position
US Billboard 200	15
US Top R&B/Hip-Hop Albums (Billboard)	1

=== Year-end charts ===
Year-end chart performance for Journey of a Gemini
Chart (2006)	Position
US Top R&B/Hip-Hop Albums (Billboard)	75
