= I'm Gonna Be (Donell Jones song) =

Single by Donell Jones

from the album Journey of a Gemini
- Released: July 31, 2006
- Recorded: 2005
- Genre: R&B
- Length: 4:46
- Label: LaFace
- Songwriter(s): Jones; Tim Kelley; Bob Robinson; Clipse
- Producer(s): Tim & Bob

Donell Jones singles chronology
"Better Start Talking" (2006)	"I'm Gonna Be" (2006)	"Special Girl" (2006)

"I’m Gonna Be" is a song by American singer Donell Jones. It was written by Jones along with Tim Kelley and Bob Robinson for his fourth studio album Journey of a Gemini (2006), while production was helmed by Kelley under their production moniker Tim & Bob. The song served as the second single from the album and reached number 41 on Billboard's Hot R&B/Hip-Hop Songs chart.

== Track listings ==
CD single
No.	Title	Length
1.	"I'm Gonna Be" (Main)	4:48
2.	"I'm Gonna Be" (Instrumental)	4:45

== Charts ==
Chart (2006)	Peak position
US Adult R&B Songs (Billboard)	10
US Hot R&B/Hip-Hop Songs (Billboard)	41
