= I'll Go =

Single by Rahsaan Patterson

from the album Love & Basketball and Soul Togetherness
- Released: April 2000 (US); February 2001 (UK)
- Recorded: 2000
- Genre: R&B; soul
- Length: 5:34
- Label: Expansion; New Line
- Songwriter(s): Rahsaan Patterson; Steve "Silk" Hurley
- Producer(s): Steve "Silk" Hurley; Rahsaan Patterson

Rahsaan Patterson singles chronology
"The Moment" (1999)	"I'll Go" (2000)	"The One for Me" (2002)

"I'll Go" is a song by American neo soul/R&B singer Rahsaan Patterson. It was co-written, co-produced by Patterson and Steve Hurley, never officially released on any Patterson albums. R&B singer Donell Jones recorded his cover of the tune that appears on the soundtrack album, Love & Basketball released in April 2000.

Patterson's recorded version is on Soul Togetherness released on Expansion Records, a 2001 compilation album featuring various artists, which include Al Green, Rachelle Ferrell, The Spinners and Reggie Calloway.
