= Love Like This (Donell Jones song) =

Single by Donell Jones

from the album Lyrics
- Released: August 10, 2010
- Genre: R&B
- Length: 3:37
- Label: E1
- Songwriter(s): Donell Jones
- Producer(s): Donell Jones

Donell Jones singles chronology
| "Spend the Night" (2007) | "Love Like This" (2010) |

"Love Like This" is a song by R&B singer-songwriter Donell Jones. It is the lead single from his sixth album Lyrics. The single peaked at number 25 on the Hot R&B/Hip-Hop Songs chart.

== Charts ==
=== Weekly charts ===
| Chart (2010) | Peak position |
|---|---|
| US Adult R&B Songs (Billboard) | 5 |
| US Hot R&B/Hip-Hop Songs (Billboard) | 25 |

=== Year-end charts ===
| Chart (2010) | Position |
|---|---|
| US Adult R&B Songs (Billboard) | 22 |
| US Hot R&B/Hip-Hop Songs (Billboard) | 96 |

== Release information ==
=== Purchaseable release ===
| Country | Date | Format | Label |
|---|---|---|---|
| United States | August 10, 2010 | Digital download | E1 Music |
