= Knocks Me Off My Feet =

Song by Stevie Wonder

from the album Songs in the Key of Life
- Genre: Soul
- Length: 3:36
- Label: Tamla
- Songwriter: Stevie Wonder
- Producer: Stevie Wonder

"Knocks Me Off My Feet" is a song written and performed by American recording artist Stevie Wonder, from his 1976 album Songs in the Key of Life. It was not released as a single, though it was released as a B-side to "I Ain't Gonna Stand for It" four years later, in 1980. The song has also been covered by numerous artists, including R&B singer Donell Jones, who released his version as a single in 1996. Other notable recordings include those by Tevin Campbell and Luther Vandross, both also released in 1996.

It is a love song, in which the narrator tells his paramour that her love for him "makes me weak, and knocks me off my feet". Despite websites stating the song is in F major, it was actually composed in C major.

== Donell Jones version ==
Donell Jones released a cover of "Knocks Me Off My Feet" as the second single from his debut album, My Heart, in 1996. This version hit #49 on the Billboard Hot 100, and #14 on the Billboard Hot R&B/Hip-Hop Songs chart.

== Other covers ==
It was covered by Tevin Campbell in 1996 for the soundtrack to A Thin Line Between Love and Hate. This version, though it was not released as a single, still managed to reach #75 on the Hot R&B/Hip-Hop Airplay chart.

The song was covered by Luther Vandross on his 1996 album Your Secret Love.

Other artists who have covered the song include Jeffrey Osborne, Najee and Marco Sison.

The song has been performed by various contestants on singing competition television shows, including Adam Garner on Pop Idol, Andrew Boderick on Canadian Idol and Elliott Yamin, Sanjaya Malakar and Jermaine Jones on different seasons of American Idol.

In a scene from the movie Beauty Shop, Joe (Djimon Hounsou) is playing "Knocks Me Off My Feet" on the piano, capturing the attention of Gina (Queen Latifah) and her piano prodigy daughter Vanessa (Paige Hurd) from Gina's salon beneath Joe's apartment.

== Samples ==
The first two notes of the piano intro for "Knocks Me Off My Feet" were sampled by Ol' Dirty Bastard on the 1995 song "Shimmy Shimmy Ya".

The song's chorus was interpolated in the 2002 song "Thug Lovin'" by Ja Rule featuring Bobby Brown.
