= Les Nubians =

French musical duo

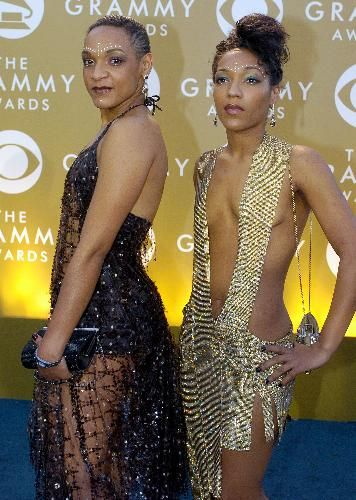
- Les Nubians in 2003

Background information
- Origin: Bordeaux, France
- Genres: R&B, African, neo soul
- Years active: 1998–present
- Labels: Nubiatik, Virgin, Higher Octave, Shanachie
- Website: LesNubians.com

Les Nubians is a French musical duo, composed of sisters Hélène and Célia Faussart from Paris, France. In 1985, the sisters moved with their parents to Chad. Seven years later, they returned to Bordeaux, France, and began singing a cappella, producing poetry slams in Bordeaux and Paris, and singing background vocals for various artists worldwide. The duo's debut album Princesses Nubiennes was released by Virgin Records, France, in 1998.

They have become one of the most successful French-language musical groups in the U.S., best known for their Billboard R&B Single "Makeda" from their Grammy nominated album Princesses Nubiennes. Les Nubians were the 1999 Soul Train Lady of Soul Awards winners for Best New Artist, Group or Duo and received two NAACP Image Awards nominations in 2000.

In May 2020, the sisters were featured in the Visual Collaborative Polaris catalog. In a series titled TwentyEightyFour released during the peak of the COVID-19 pandemic, their interview announced a music single LIBERATION. Rika Muranaka, Dakore Akande appeared in the same periodical. The duo executive-produced Echos, Chapter One in 2005 on their label Nubiatik; a joint venture with Triloka Records. The project features artists from France, and the U.S. performing poetry and music from the urban edge. Echos, Chapter One: Nubian Voyager was released in 2006 as a book accompaniment to the CD.

== Discography ==
=== Albums ===
- Princesses Nubiennes (1998) Virgin Records
- One Step Forward (2003) Virgin Records, Higher Octave
- Echos, Chapter One (2005) Nubiatik
- Nü Revolution (2011) Nubiatik, Shanachie

=== Soundtracks ===
- Beat the World (2011)

=== Duets ===
- Sueña (Sonrisa, 2010) feat Ana Torroja

=== Guest appearances ===
- "Funkin' for Jamaica" (Towa Tei featuring Joanne, Les Nubians, Wisdom Life & Tom Browne), from the album Last Century Modern (1999)
- "On My Own" (Black Eyed Peas featuring Les Nubians and Mos Def) from the album, Bridging the Gap (2000)
- "Who's There?" (Guru) from the album, "Jazzmatazz, Vol. 3: Streetsoul" (2000)
- "Love Language" (Reflection Eternal) from the album, "Train of Thought (Reflection Eternal album)" (2002)
