= Where I Wanna Be (Donell Jones album) =

Studio album by Donell Jones
- Released: October 12, 1999
- Genre: Soul
- Length: 55:54
- Labels: LaFace; Arista
- Producers: Eddie F.; Sheldon Goode; Wesley Hogges; Darren Lighty; Donell Jones; Kyle West; Eric Williams

Donell Jones chronology
My Heart (1996)	Where I Wanna Be (1999)	Life Goes On (2002)

Singles from Where I Wanna Be
- 1. "U Know What's Up" Released: August 3, 1999; 2. "Where I Wanna Be" Released: June 20, 2000

Where I Wanna Be is the second studio album by American R&B singer Donell Jones. It was released by LaFace Records and Arista Records on October 12, 1999, in the United States. The follow-up to his debut album My Heart (1996), it became his most successful album to date, having gone platinum, and produced three singles, including the worldwide hit "U Know What's Up", Donell's biggest hit single to date, peaking inside the top 10 in the Billboard Hot 100 and at number two on the UK Singles Chart. The album also includes the UK hit "Shorty (Got Her Eyes on Me)", the minor R&B/Hip Hop hit "This Luv" and the US smash hit and title track, "Where I Wanna Be".

== Critical reception ==
Professional ratings
Review scores
Source	Rating
AllMusic	4/5 stars
Rolling Stone	3.5/5 stars

AllMusic editor Stephen Thomas Erlewine rated the album four out of five stars. He found that "on the surface of things, Jones may sound similar to a lot of his peers, but there's a greater sense of musical sophistication in his music. There are light touches of jazz, suave electric pianos, and an easy seductiveness to the entire production [...] For much of the album, Jones hits the right tone – balancing mood, song, and performance quite alluringly. It gets him and the listener where they wanna be." Rolling Stone's K. Leander Williams wrote that "Jones' vision of R&B; is more temperate than jiggy; he's a loveman who'd rather cajole his would-be paramours than steamroll them. However, once you get past the swirling acoustic guitar that graces the best tracks on Jones' second effort, Where I Wanna Be, you can glimpse some of the frustrations that trouble even a cool young smoothie."

Vibe editor Joanne Eustache found that while Where I Wanna Be "has its share of downfalls, Jones' latest project gets mucho props overall for being sincere and tasteful in an R&B; era filled with pretentiousness and lewdness. While he has a while to go before he reaches the status of R&B; lovemeisters D'Angelo, Eric Benet and Brian McKnight, albums like Where I Wanna Be contribute to the campaign of reinstating the old-school R&B; standard of originality. And while its sleepy melodies don't make it the ideal joint to pump on a cross-country car ride, it is ideal for setting the tone at a cozy gathering." In a retrospective review for BBC Music, Daryl Easlea wrote: "Jones' Where I Wanna Be is a perfect snapshot of US RnB/nu-soul at the turn of the 21st century. It is immaculately produced and delivered with great accomplishment. There is little room for spontaneity or error; it is highly polished soul at its super shiniest."

== Commercial performance ==
Where I Wanna Be debuted and peaked at number 35 on the US Billboard 200, with first week sales of 39,000 units. It also marked Jones' first top ten album on the US Top R&B/Hip-Hop Albums. The album was certified Gold by the Recording Industry Association of America (RIAA) on February 8, 2000, and Platinum on May 24, 2000. By June 2002, Where I Wanna Be had sold 1.2 million copies in the US.

== Track listing ==
Where I Wanna Be track listing
No.	Title	Writer(s)	Producer	Length
1.	"U Know What's Up"	Edward Ferrell; Darren Lighty; Clifton Lighty; Balewa Muhammad; Anthony Hamilton; Clifford Harris; Delvis Damon	Eddie F.; Darren Lighty	4:01
2.	"Shorty (Got Her Eyes on Me)"	Donell Jones; Eric Williams; Wesley Hogges; Christopher Leslie; Melvin Lewis; Thomas Martin	Jones; Williams; Hogges	3:12
3.	"Where I Wanna Be"	Jones; Kyle West	Jones; West	4:13
4.	"Have You Seen Her"	Williams; Hogges; Lewis; Kent Lawrence	Williams; Hogges	3:42
5.	"This Luv"	Jones; Sheldon Goode	Jones; Goode	4:09
6.	"All Her Love"	Jones; Goode; Joylan Skinner	Jones; Goode	4:35
7.	"It's Alright"	Jones; Goode	Jones; Goode	4:23
8.	"Think About It (Don't Call My Crib)"	Jones	Jones	5:37
9.	"He Won't Hurt You"	Jones	Jones	4:50
10.	"Pushin'"	Ferrell; D. Lighty; C. Lighty; Muhammad; Veronica McKenzie; Hamilton	Eddie F.; Darren Lighty	4:55
11.	"I Wanna Luv U"	Jones	Jones	4:18
12.	"When I Was Down"	Jones; Goode; Curtis Mayfield	Jones; Goode	3:47
13.	"U Know What's Up (Remix)" (featuring Lisa "Left Eye" Lopes)	Ferrell; D. Lighty; C. Lighty; Muhammad; Hamilton; Harris; Damon; Lopes; Inga Nandi Willis	Eddie F.; Darren Lighty	4:03
Total length:				55:54

== Charts ==
=== Weekly charts ===
Weekly chart performance for Where I Wanna Be
Chart (1999)	Peak position
UK Albums (Official Charts)	47
UK R&B Albums (Official Charts)	3
US Billboard 200	35
US Top R&B/Hip-Hop Albums (Billboard)	6

=== Year-end charts ===
Year-end chart performance for Where I Wanna Be
Chart (2000)	Position
US Billboard 200	85
US Top R&B/Hip-Hop Albums (Billboard)	13

== Certifications ==
Certifications for Where I Wanna Be
Region	Certification	Certified units/sales
United Kingdom (BPI)	Gold	100,000^{*}
United States (RIAA)	Platinum	1,000,000^{^}
^{*} Sales figures based on certification alone.^{^} Shipments figures based on certification alone.
