= U Know What's Up =

1999 single by Donell Jones

Single by Donell Jones featuring Lisa Lopes

from the album Where I Wanna Be
- Released: August 3, 1999
- Length: 3:59
- Label: LaFace; Arista; Untouchables
- Songwriters: Edward Ferrell; Darren Lighty; Clifton Lighty; Balewa Muhammad; Anthony Hamilton; Veronica McKenzie
- Producers: Eddie F.; Darren Lighty

Donell Jones singles chronology
"You Should Know" (1997)	"U Know What's Up" (1999)	"It's So Hard" (2000)

Lisa Lopes singles chronology
"Cradle of Rock" (1998)	"U Know What's Up" (1999)	"I Do" (remix) (1999)

"U Know What's Up" is a song by American R&B singer Donell Jones. It was written by Edward "Eddie F." Ferrell, Darren Lighty, Clifton Lighty, Balewa Muhammad, Anthony Hamilton, and Veronica McKenzie for his second studio album, Where I Wanna Be (1999), while production was helmed by Ferrell and Darren Lighty for Untouchables Entertainment.

Released as the album's lead single, the song became Jones' biggest hit, reaching the top 10 in Ireland and on the US Billboard Hot 100. The song was most successful in the United Kingdom, where it peaked at number two on the UK Singles Chart. In addition, "U Know What's Up" topped Billboard's Hot R&B/Hip-Hop Singles & Tracks chart for eight consecutive weeks, his only single to do so. A remix version featuring Left Eye of TLC was used for the accompanying music video.

== Background ==
"U Know What's Up" was composed by Edward "Eddie F." Ferrell, Darren Lighty, Clifton Lighty, Balewa Muhammad, Anthony Hamilton, and Veronica McKenzie for Donell Jones' second studio album, Where I Wanna Be (1999). Production on the song was helmed by Ferrell and Darren Lighty for Untouchables Entertainment. Originally envisioned as a Southern-inspired track titled "When You Hear the Car Horn Blow" and heavily influenced by Hamilton, the song was extensively reworked after being played for Jones, who liked the music but was unhappy with the lyrics. Muhammad originally pushed for 50 Cent to appear as a guest vocalist on the remix version of "U Know What's Up", having been impressed by his 1999 debut single, "How to Rob," but was ultimately overruled. He later acknowledged that TLC member Lisa "Left Eye" Lopes' involvement helped elevate the song to crossover success.

== Commercial performance ==
"U Know What's Up" became Jones' biggest-selling single and marked his international breakthrough, achieving strong chart positions and impressive sales worldwide. In the United States, the song topped the Billboard Hot R&B/Hip-Hop Singles & Tracks chart and reached number seven on the Billboard Hot 100, while also peaking at 23 on the US Rhythmic Top 40 chart. In December 1999, it was certified Gold by the Recording Industry Association of America (RIAA) for shipments figures in excess of 500,000 units. The following year, Billboard ranked it fifth on its Hot R&B/Hip-Hop Singles & Tracks year-end chart.

Internationally, the song performed well in the United Kingdom, reaching number two on the UK Singles Chart and claiming the top spot on the UK Hip Hop/R&B Singles Chart. It has since been certified Platinum by the British Phonographic Industry (BPI) for sales of 600,000 units. Elsewhere in Europe, the single charted within the top 10 in Ireland. It also entered the top 15 in Scotland and reached the top 30 in the Netherlands. "U Know What's Up" further peaked at number nine on both the Canadian Top 30 Dance chart and a composite European Hot 100 Singles.

== Music video ==
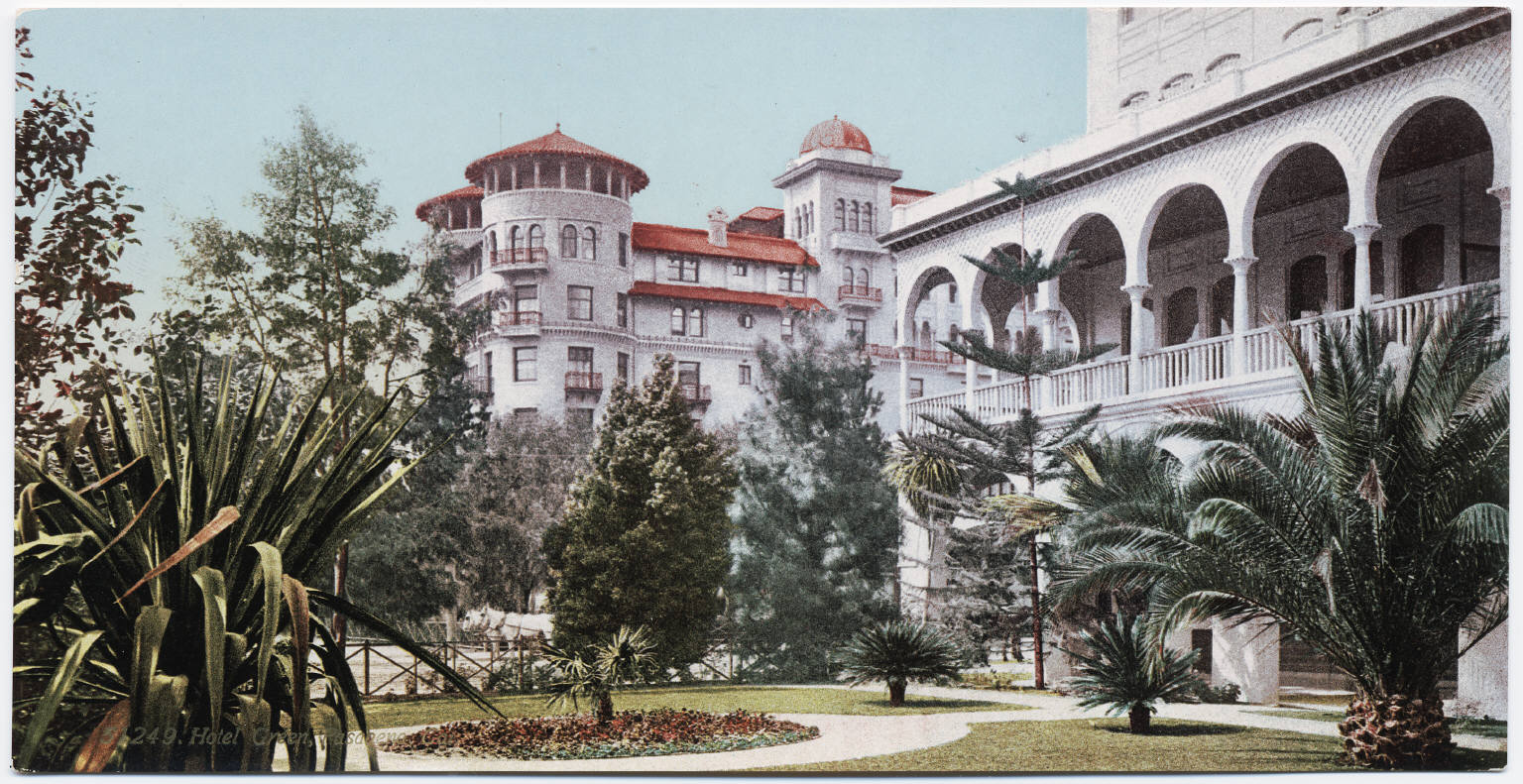
The music video for "U Know What's Up" was filmed at Castle Green in Pasadena.

A music video for "U Know What's Up" was directed by Bille Woodruff and partly filmed at Castle Green, a hotel in Pasadena, California, built in 1893 by George Gill Green. Using the remix version of the song, it features appearances from Lopes as well as cameos from J-Bo and Sean Paul of YoungBloodZ, T.I., Usher and Big Boi of OutKast, all of whom were (including Jones) part of the LaFace Records label. At the beginning of the video, a sign in front of the hotel says La Face Place, in reference to the record label. The clip premiered on BET on the week ending September 12, 1999.

The video begins with Left Eye at her apartment receiving a phone call, presumably from Jones, informing her that the music video for the song is being aired on TV. She turns to the TV screen behind her playing the video, which shows Jones at a hotel party, and proceeds to watch it. As it turns out, Left Eye is not the only person watching the video, as the video pans across the building showing Usher and his girlfriend at his apartment, and Big Boi hosting a music video premiere at his apartment. Midway through the video, Left Eye leaves her apartment and recites her verse in the song while walking across the corridor, presumably to join Jones at a similar party at the back of the building, which is revealed as the camera pulls back from the corridor. At the end, the video pulls back to reveal Jones watching it at his apartment with his girlfriend.

== Track listings ==
US CD and cassette single

1. "U Know What's Up" (album version) – 4:02
2. "Shorty (Got Her Eyes on Me)" (excerpt) – 2:05
3. Album snippets – 5:46

US 12-inch single

A1. "U Know What's Up" (clean version edit) – 4:02
A2. "U Know What's Up" (instrumental) – 4:02
A3. "U Know What's Up" (clean acapella) – 3:45
B1. "U Know What's Up" (clean version) – 4:02
B2. "U Know What's Up" (album version) – 4:02
B3. "U Know What's Up" (dirty version) – 4:02

Australian CD single

1. "U Know What's Up" (clean version) – 4:02
2. "U Know What's Up" (album version featuring Left Eye) – 4:03
3. "U Know What's Up" (instrumental) – 4:02
4. Album snippets – 5:46

UK CD1

1. "U Know What's Up" (album version) – 4:01
2. "U Know What's Up" (album version featuring Left Eye) – 4:03
3. "U Know What's Up" (video version) – 3:55

UK CD2

1. "U Know What's Up" (Jeremy B radio edit) – 3:36
2. "U Know What's Up" (Jeremy B main mix) – 7:04
3. "U Know What's Up" (Jeremy B The Edge dub) – 7:20

UK 12-inch single

A1. "U Know What's Up" (Jeremy B main mix) – 7:04
A2. "U Know What's Up" (Jeremy B main instrumental) – 7:04
B1. "U Know What's Up" (Jeremy B The Edge dub) – 7:20
B2. "U Know What's Up" (album version) – 4:03

UK cassette single and European CD single

1. "U Know What's Up" (album version featuring Left Eye) – 4:03
2. "U Know What's Up" (Jeremy B radio edit) – 3:36

== Charts ==
=== Weekly charts ===
Weekly chart performance for "U Know What's Up"
Chart (1999–2000)	Peak position
Australia (ARIA)	55
Belgium (Ultratip Bubbling Under Flanders)	4
Canada Dance/Urban (RPM)	9
Europe (European Hot 100 Singles)	9
Iceland (Íslenski Listinn Topp 40)	34
Ireland (IRMA)	10
Netherlands (Dutch Top 40)	23
Netherlands (Single Top 100)	28
New Zealand (Recorded Music NZ)	30
Scottish Singles Sales (Official Charts)	12
Sweden (Sverigetopplistan)	48
UK Singles (Official Charts)	2
UK Hip Hop/R&B (Official Charts)	1
US Billboard Hot 100	7
US Hot R&B/Hip-Hop Singles & Tracks (Billboard)	1
US Rhythmic Top 40 (Billboard)	23

=== Year-end charts ===
1999 year-end chart performance for "U Know What's Up"
Chart (1999)	Position
UK Urban (Music Week)	1
US Hot R&B/Hip-Hop Singles & Tracks (Billboard)	42

2000 year-end chart performance for "U Know What's Up"
Chart (2000)	Position
UK Singles (OCC)	53
US Billboard Hot 100	65
US Hot R&B/Hip-Hop Singles & Tracks (Billboard)	5
US Rhythmic Top 40 (Billboard)	99

== Certifications ==
Certifications and sales for "U Know What's Up"
Region	Certification	Certified units/sales
United Kingdom (BPI)	Platinum	600,000^{‡}
United States (RIAA)	Gold	500,000^{^}
^{^} Shipments figures based on certification alone.^{‡} Sales+streaming figures based on certification alone.

== Release history ==
"U Know What's Up" release history
Region	Date	Format(s)	Label(s)	Ref.
United States	August 3, 1999	Urban radio	LaFace; Untouchables	
United States	September 14, 1999	Urban AC radio	LaFace; Untouchables	
United States	September 21, 1999	Rhythmic contemporary radio	LaFace; Untouchables	
United Kingdom	January 10, 2000	12-inch vinyl; CD; cassette	LaFace; Arista; Untouchables	
New Zealand	March 6, 2000	CD; cassette	LaFace; Arista; Untouchables	

== See also ==
- R&B number-one hits of 1999 (USA)
- R&B number-one hits of 2000 (USA)
