= You Know That I Love You (Donell Jones song) =

Single by Donell Jones

from the album Life Goes On
- Released: April 9, 2002
- Recorded: July–September 2001
- Genre: R&B
- Length: 4:20
- Label: Arista
- Songwriters: Chris Absolam, Jamie Hawkins, Richard Smith
- Producers: Chris Absolam, Jamie Hawkins

Donell Jones singles chronology
"Do What I Gotta Do" (2000)	"You Know That I Love You" (2002)	"Put Me Down" (2002)

"You Know That I Love You" is a song by American recording artist Donell Jones, released on April 9, 2002 as the first single from the album, Life Goes On (2002). Jazz saxophonist Kim Waters covers "You Know That I Love You" serving as the opening track on his 2002 album titled Someone to Love You, and Kim Waters' cover was picked by several Urban AC stations and some stations such as KJLH in Los Angeles played the Donell Jones version with the jazz mixed in late 2002, which started playing the original R&B version on the week of March 25, 2002. The single received major airplay on Mainstream Urban, CHR/Rhythmic and Urban AC radio stations. KKBT in Los Angeles started playing it on April 1, 2002 a week after it officially it impacted Urban Radio.

== Music video ==
The music video for "You Know That I Love You" was directed by Chris Robinson and it first aired on the week of April 15, 2002.

== Track listing ==
UK CD-Single

No.	Title	Length
1.	"You Know That I Love You" (Radio Mix)	4:22
2.	"You Know That I Love You" (5AM Remix)	4:27
3.	"You Know That I Love You" (Samba La Casa Remix)	6:16

== Charts ==
=== Weekly charts ===
Chart (2002)	Peak position
Scottish Singles Sales (Official Charts)	98
UK Singles (Official Charts)	41
UK Hip Hop/R&B (Official Charts)	9
US Billboard Hot 100	54
US Hot R&B/Hip-Hop Songs (Billboard)	16

=== Year-end charts ===
Chart (2002)	Position
US Hot R&B/Hip-Hop Songs (Billboard)	47
