= Darren Lighty =

American musician

- Birth name: Darren F. Lighty
- Also known as: D-Life, Smooth
- Born: April 6, 1969 (age 55); Paterson, New Jersey
- Genres: Hip hop, R&B
- Occupation(s): Session musician, Record producer, Background vocalist
- Instrument: Keyboards
- Years active: 1990–present
- Labels: Cold Chillin', Divine Mill
- Website: Darren Lighty's Twitter Page

Darren Lighty (born April 6, 1969 in Paterson, New Jersey) is an American hip-hop and R&B record producer and songwriter.

Lighty got his initial start in the industry as part of the group The Flex, which also included his brother Cliff Lighty and Eric Williams. They were discovered by hip hop producer Marley Marl, who had them sing the hooks on songs he produced for LL Cool J, Heavy D. & the Boyz, Craig G and Intelligent Hoodlum. The group disbanded before recording an album and the trio went their separate ways. Darren and his brother Cliff continued on as songwriters and session musicians, while Eric Williams became a member of Teddy Riley's group Blackstreet.

In the early 2000s, Lighty closely worked with Eddie F. on several songs as a producer. He later collaborated with Naughty by Nature member Kay Gee for production and songwriting. Lighty has worked with artists such as Aaliyah, Donell Jones, Jaheim, Next, Luther Vandross, Queen Latifah, Nas, Mario and more.
