= Donell Jones =

American singer, songwriter and record producer

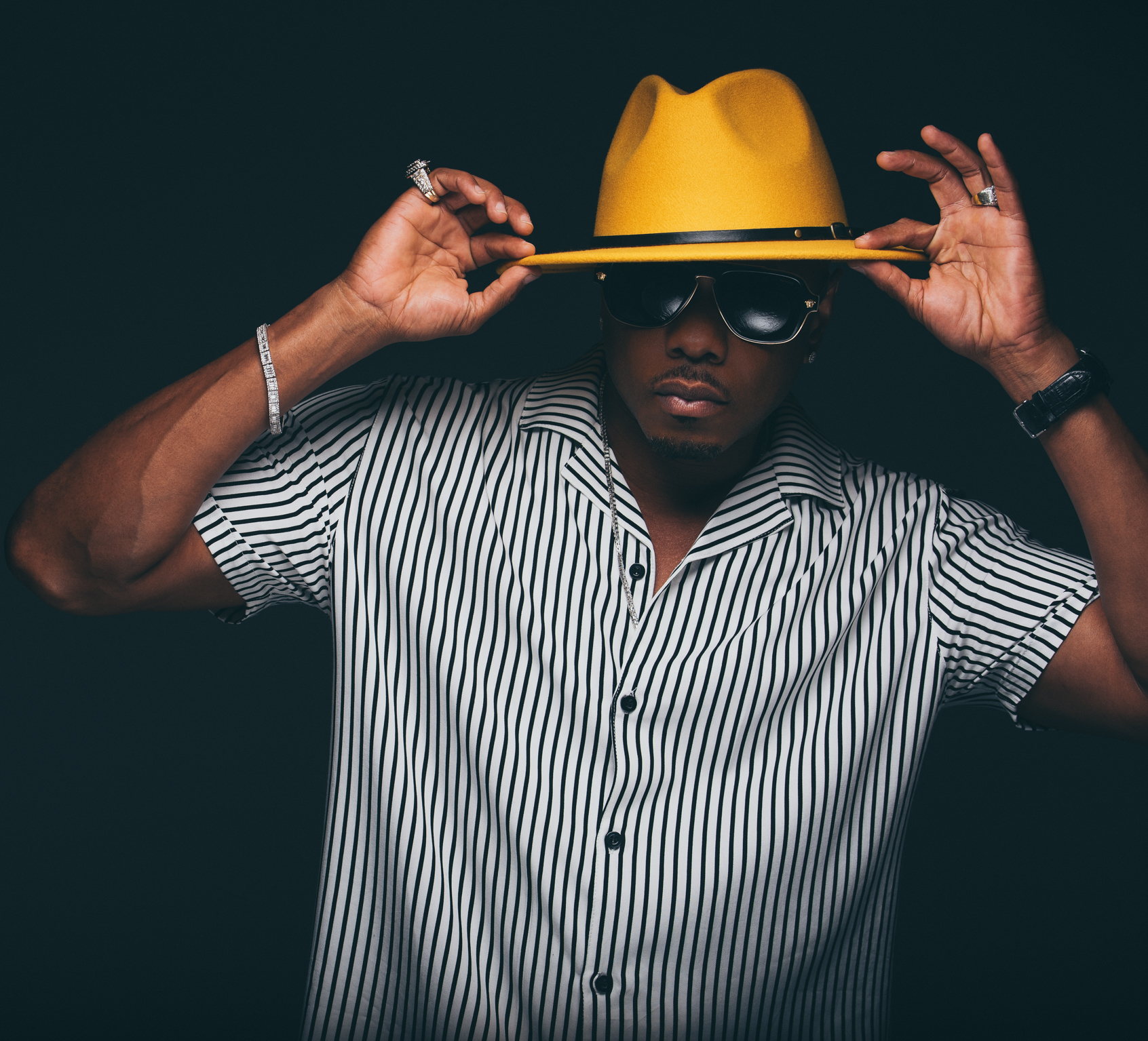
- Jones in 2025

Background information
- Born: May 22, 1973 (age 53); Chicago, Illinois, U.S.
- Genres: R&B, urban pop
- Occupations: Singer; songwriter; record producer
- Works: Donell Jones discography
- Years active: 1996–present
- Labels: Untouchables; LaFace; Arista; Jive; Sony; E1
- Website: donelljonesmusic.com

Donell Jones (born May 22, 1973) is an American R&B singer, songwriter, and record producer from Chicago, Illinois. He met record producer Eddie F in the mid-1990s and signed with his record label Untouchables Entertainment, beginning his career as a songwriter for its parent label, LaFace Records. He signed with the label as a recording artist to release his debut studio album, My Heart (1996), which was met with lukewarm commercial reception despite yielding his first Billboard Hot 100 entries with its singles "In the Hood", and his cover of Stevie Wonder's "Knocks Me Off My Feet."

Jones became best known for his second album, Where I Wanna Be (1999), and its lead single, "U Know What's Up" (featuring Lisa Lopes). The album received platinum certification by the Recording Industry of America (RIAA), while the song peaked at number seven on the Billboard Hot 100; its follow-up single, "Where I Wanna Be" peaked within the chart's top 40. His third album, Life Goes On (2002) peaked at number three on the Billboard 200, while his fourth, Journey of a Gemini (2006) peaked at number 15. His compilation album, The Best of Donell Jones (2007) served as his final release with LaFace.

== Life and career ==
Jones is the son of Renee Byrd and gospel singer Roy Jones. He was raised in Chicago, Illinois. He later met DJ Eddie F of Heavy D & the Boyz and signed with Untouchables and LaFace Records, writing songs for Usher and 702.

=== 1996–2007: Breakthrough with LaFace ===
In June 1996, Jones released his debut album, My Heart, on LaFace Records. While most of the album was produced by Jones himself, it also featured help from Eddie Ferrell's Untouchables Entertainment production team, involving Mookie, Marks Sparks, Kenny Tonge, and Darin Whittington. It peaked at number 30 on Billboard's Top R&B/Hip-Hop Albums chart, but failed to reach the upper half of the US Billboard 200. Its first two singles, "In the Hood" and a cover of Stevie Wonder's 1976 ballad "Knocks Me Off My Feet", became top thirty hits on the Hot R&B/Hip-Hop Songs chart as well as the New Zealand Singles Chart.

In 1999, Jones enjoyed major success with the release of his second album, Where I Wanna Be. Boosted by its hit single "U Know What's Up", which peaked at number seven on the Billboard Hot 100. "U Know What's Up" was a global hit, peaking within the top ten of the charts in the Republic of Ireland and the United Kingdom. In the latter country, "U Know What's Up" entered and peaked at number two on the UK Singles Chart, where it remained for two consecutive weeks behind "The Masses Against the Classes" by Manic Street Preachers and "Born to Make You Happy" by Britney Spears. "Where I Wanna Be" peaked at number six on the Top R&B/Hip-Hop Albums in the United States. The album produced three further singles, including "Shorty (Got Her Eyes On Me)" and "Where I Wanna Be," the latter of which reached number two on Billboard's Hot R&B/Hip-Hop Songs chart, and was eventually certified platinum by the Recording Industry Association of America (RIAA) for sales in excess of 1.0 million copies. In 2000, Jones recorded the song "I'll Go" for the soundtrack of the romantic drama film Love & Basketball, which earned him a Black Reel Award nomination for Best Original or Adapted Song. The same year, he was also awarded an American Music Award in the Favorite Soul/R&B New Artist category.

Jones reteamed with his regular team of contributors, including Eddie F, Sheldon Goode, Jamie Hawkins, G-Wise, Kyle West, and Darren Lighty to work on his third album Life Goes On. Released in June 2002, it debuted number 3 on the Billboard 200 and at number three on the Top R&B/Hip-Hop Albums chart, becoming his highest-charting effort yet. A steady seller it earned gold status from the Recording Industry Association of America (RIAA). Its three singles were less successful however, though lead single "You Know That I Love You" became a top twenty hit on the R&B charts. Jones' fourth album, Journey of a Gemini was released in 2006 and marked his first album to include a diverse roster of collaborators including production credits from Tim & Bob, Sean Garrett, Ryan Leslie, Tank, Mike City, and The Underdogs. It became Jones' highest-charting album on the Billboard Top R&B/Hip-Hop Albums chart, where it topped at number one, while entering the top 20 on the Billboard 200.

=== 2009–present: Independent releases ===
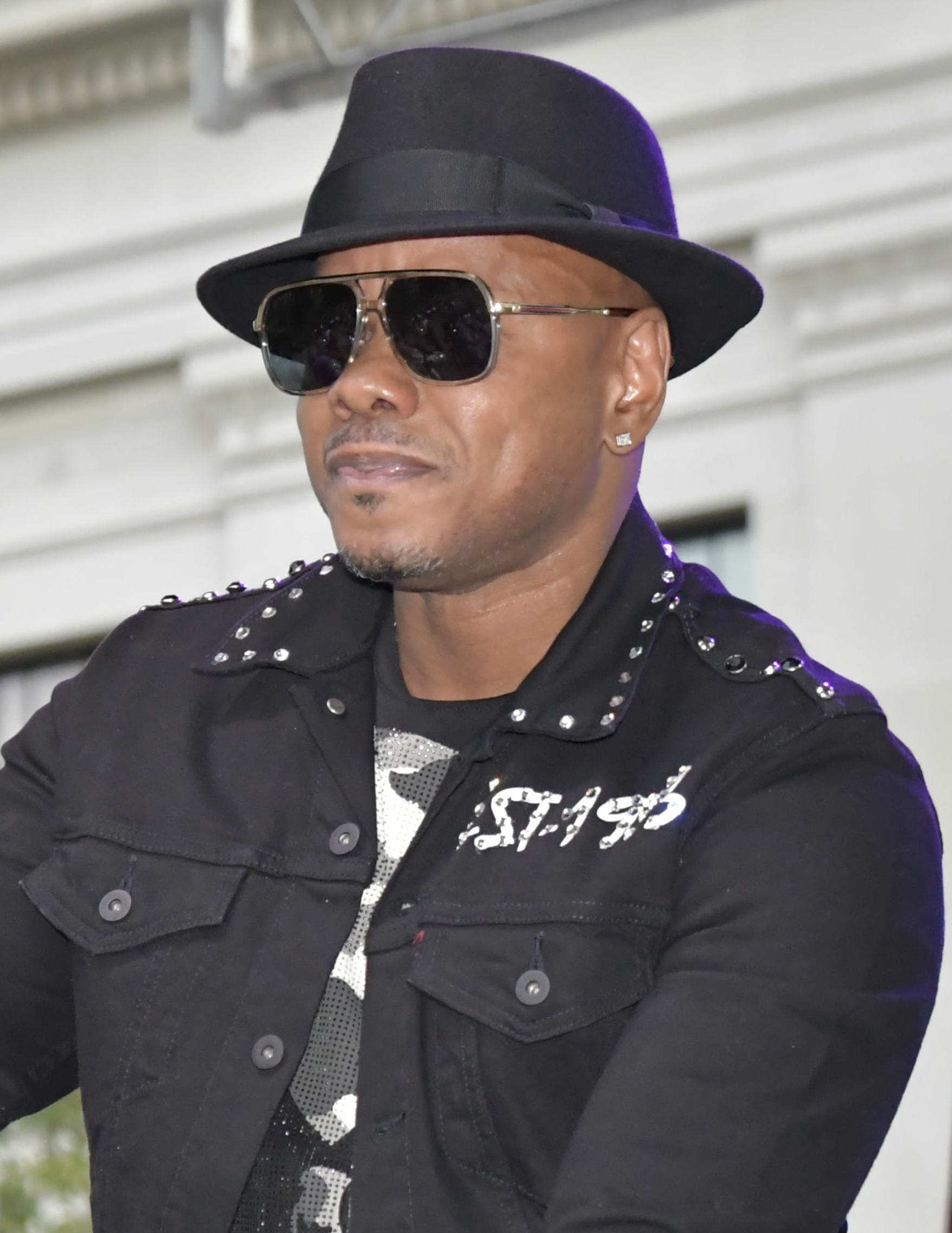
Jones in 2019

In 2009, Jones released The Lost Files, a collection of unreleased songs that were recorded between 1996 and 2004, through his own label Candyman Music Inc and TuneCore. Serving as prelude to his next studio album, The Lost Files failed to chart. Lyrics, Jones' fifth regular album, was released in September 2010 via Candyman and eOne Music. Chiefly produced by Jones' himself, it debuted and peaked at number 28 on the US Billboard 200 and at number nine on the Top R&B/Hip-Hop Albums chart, becoming his fourth entry on the latter chart. Lyrics produced two singles, including "Love Like This" which reached the top five of Billboard's Adult R&B Songs chart.

Jones' sixth album Forever was released in July 2013. Another project conceived under Candyman and eOne Music, it debuted and peaked at number 20 on the Billboard 200 and reached number eight on the Top R&B/Hip-Hop Albums chart. The album spawned two singles. Its title track which peaked at number 14 on Billboard's Adult R&B Songs chart. In 2016, Jones premiered the single "Never Let Her Go", a collaboration with rapper David Banner. In support of the single, he went on a promo tour during spring 2017. In 2018, Jones provided vocals, produced, and co-wrote on "23" by Jacquees off the album 4275 (2018).

In 2019, Jones collaborated with Jon B. on the duet "Understand". He also announced plans for an upcoming album to release in 2019 during an appearance on the SoulBack R&B Podcast. The project, called 100% Free, was expected to be released in December 2020, but eventually came out on digital services (and for free on his official website) on February 14, 2021.

== Discography ==
Studio albums

- My Heart (1996)
- Where I Wanna Be (1999)
- Life Goes On (2002)
- Journey of a Gemini (2006)
- Lyrics (2010)
- Forever (2013)
- 100% Free (2021)
