= Eddie F =

American record producer

DJ Eddie F
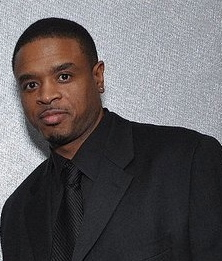
- Ferrell in 2011

Background information
- Born: Edward Ferrell; March 25, 1968 (age 58); Mount Vernon, New York, U.S.
- Genres: Hip hop; R&B
- Occupations: Record producer; disc jockey; songwriter; record executive
- Years active: 1986–present
- Labels: Uptown; LaFace; Motown; Def Jam; Untouchables
- Formerly of: Heavy D & The Boyz

Edward Ferrell is an American record producer, DJ, songwriter, and record executive. He served as Vice President of A&R of LaFace Records from to 1993 to 1995, Executive Vice President of Motown from 1995 to 1997, and Executive Consultant to chairman L.A. Reid of Def Jam Recordings from 2005 to 2007. He also founded the record label Untouchables Entertainment Group, through which he discovered and signed R&B acts Donell Jones, I.N.T.R.O., and hip-hop duo Pete Rock & C.L. Smooth.

In his solo career, Ferrell has produced for artists including Mary J. Blige, Erick Sermon, Guy, LL Cool J, Angie Stone, and Al B. Sure! throughout the mid-1990s. Ferrell has served as the primary and executive producer for Donell Jones' first four studio albums, as well as his 1999 single "U Know What's Up", which peaked within the top ten of the Billboard Hot 100 and went number one on the Billboard Hot R&B/Hip-Hop Songs chart. A key figure in hip hop and R&B sampling, Ferrell is credited with creating the first "Featured artist remix", whereby a track was reworked with both a new instrumental and verse by a hip hop artist. The first project that did so was the 1990 remix of Johnny Gill's "Rub U The Right Way" remix, featuring C.L. Smooth. Ferrell also helped his high school buddy, Al B. Sure!, secure a deal by playing his demo for Uptown label boss Andre Harrell, who then took Sure's demo to Quincy Jones and Benny Medina, leading him to sign with Uptown and Warner Bros. Records.

== Career ==
Based in Mount Vernon, New York, Eddie F made his initial entry into production for his involvement on the two debut singles from the Uptown Records label, "Uptown Is Kicking It" and "Mr Big Stuff;" the latter of which was included on the label's breakout project, the gold-certified Heavy D & the Boyz debut album, Living Large (1987). Eddie F first became known professionally as the co-founder and member of the Hip Hop / Rap group Heavy D & the Boyz, along with business partner Heavy D. He also served as the de facto producer and DJ. The group released seven commercially successful studio albums. Meanwhile, he was also credited with his affiliation and development for much of the talent coming out of the Mt. Vernon area, including Al B. Sure!, Dave "Jam" Hall, Kenny Smoove, as well as Sean "Diddy" Combs, who lived with Ferrell in his home studio loft for a while during the early stages of his Uptown Records intern career. Prior, in the late 1980s, he also founded the record label Untouchables Entertainment.

By the early 90s, Ferrell had discovered the rap duo Pete Rock & CL Smooth and R&B trio Intro. In 1990, he composed the theme song music for the Fox television series In Living Color starring then-upcoming comedians Jamie Foxx, Jim Carrey, Marlon Wayans and Jennifer Lopez. By the mid-90s, he had held the title of Vice President of A&R for LaFace Records, reporting to co-owner and founder L.A. Reid, and was responsible for assisting Reid in managing its talent roster which included Usher, OutKast, TLC, Goodie Mob, Organized Noize, and Toni Braxton. He would also serve as A&R for the Grammy Award-winning album of The Tony Rich Project, Words (1996).

In 1994, Ferrell released Eddie F. and the Untouchables: Let's Get It On album for Motown. Spotlighting the works of his Untouchables group, the compilation featured the only known in-studio collaboration of two then-upcoming hip-hop rappers at the time, Tupac Shakur and the Notorious B.I.G., on the title track "Let's Get It On" - which also featured Heavy D and Grand Puba. Also on Motown, he served as Executive Vice President of A&R - managing a superstar roster including Queen Latifah, Diana Ross, The Temptations, and Boyz II Men, as well as newcomers 98 Degrees, 702, Taral Hicks, and his personal signing of Mario Winans. During this time, he discovered a then-unknown Chicago singer named Donell Jones.

Ferrell quickly invested in Jones. He then secured a distribution outlet for Jones and further developed his relationship with LA Reid and LaFace Records spawning the hit single "U Know What's Up" featuring Left Eye of TLC, which was also produced by him. Some of the notable albums and Greatest Hits projects he has served as A&R and/or executive producer include Pete Rock & CL Smooth - Mecca and the Soul Brother, INTRO - Intro, Donell Jones - Where I Wanna Be & Story of My Heart, The Tony Rich Project - Words, Stevie Wonder - Song Review: A Greatest Hits Collection, and RUN DMC - Run-D.M.C..

== See also ==
- Category:Albums produced by Eddie F
