= DFS Records =

Record label based in Atlanta, Georgia, USA

- Founded: 2002
- Founder: Dan Johnson
- Genre: various
- Country of origin: Canada
- Location: Atlanta, Georgia
- Official website: Official Site

DFS Records is a record label founded in 2003 by record producer Dan "DFS" Johnson. The independent label was the former home to award-winning Canadian recording artist Promise. In 2003 the label released its first single "Tonite" featuring Aion Clarke from Promise's debut album The Promise That Heaven Kept, it went on to reach #4 on the Rhythmic Top 10 - Canadian Christian Radio Chart.

== Artists ==
=== Current acts ===
Act	Year	Releases
Elektrofunk	2018	0

=== Former acts ===
Act	Year	Releases
Dirty B	2010-2014	1
Json	2005-2007	0
Promise	2002-2009	2

== Discography ==
Albums
Promise - "More Than Music"
- Released: August 8, 2008
- Sales: --
- Singles: "In God We Trust" ft. Elzhi (of Slum Village), J. Ivy, Calvin Richardson,

"Change" ft. Royce Da 5'9", Supastition, Mr. Probz

Promise - "The Promise That Heaven Kept"
- Released: August 15, 2003
- Sales: 6,000
- Singles: "Alright", "Tonite" ft. Aion Clarke

== Awards ==
- 2002 CGMA Covenant Award for "Hip-Hop/Rap Song of the Year" for "Alright" by Promise
- 2003 Vibe Award nominee for "Best Hip-Hop/Rap Album of the Year" for "The Promise That Heaven Kept" by Promise
- 2003 UMAC Award nominee for "Best Gospel Recording" for "Alright" by Promise
- 2009 CGMA Covenant Award winner for "Rap/Hip-Hop Album of the Year" for "More Than Music" by Promise
