= More Than a Woman =

More Than a Woman may refer to:

- More Than a Woman (album), a 2002 album by Toni Braxton
- "More Than a Woman" (Aaliyah song), 2001
- "More Than a Woman" (Angie Stone song), 2001
- "More Than a Woman" (Bee Gees song), 1977; covered by Tavares and 911
- "More Than a Woman", a 1941 short story by Pearl S. Buck

== See also ==
- Nothing More Than a Woman, a 1934 American drama film
