= The Promise That Heaven Kept =

Album by Promise

TPTHK

Studio album by Promise
- Released: August 08, 2002
- Recorded: 2001–2002
- Genres: gospel, hip hop
- Length: 58:31
- Labels: DFS Records, Indiepool Distribution
- Producer: Dan "DFS" Johnson

Promise chronology
| TPTHK (2002) | More Than Music (2008) |

Singles from TPTHK
- 1. "Alright" Released: August 08, 2002

TPTHK [The Promise That Heaven Kept] is the first studio album by Canadian recording artist Promise. It was released on August 8, 2002. The album features guest appearances from Sean Slaughter and Aion Clarke (aka Voyce Alexander), among others. The album was released by independent record label DFS Records.

== Track listing ==
| No. | Title | Writer(s) | Producer(s) | Length |
|---|---|---|---|---|
| 1. | "Intro" | P. Shepherd, D. Johnson | Dan "DFS" Johnson | 2:40 |
| 2. | "World System" | P. Shepherd, D. Johnson, A. Clarke | Dan "DFS" Johnson | 3.28 |
| 3. | "This Man" | P. Shepherd, D. Johnson | Dan "DFS" Johnson | 4.05 |
| 4. | "The Truth" (featuring Janée Olivia) | P. Shepherd, D. Johnson, J. Reid | Dan "DFS" Johnson | 3:54 |
| 5. | "Alright" (featuring Juandé) | P. Shepherd, D. Johnson, J. Reid | Dan "DFS" Johnson | 3:41 |
| 6. | "Goodbye (To Whom It May Concern)" | P. Shepherd, D. Johnson | Dan "DFS" Johnson | 3:23 |
| 7. | "No Regrets" (featuring Chisoni and Focus) | P. Shepherd, D. Johnson, C. Bravo, M. London | Dan "DFS" Johnson | 3:11 |
| 8. | "Question" (featuring Cuzn Lenroy & Co.) | P. Shepherd, D. Johnson | Dan "DFS" Johnson | 3:29 |
| 9. | "Down To Earth" (featuring Minima of Christyle) | D. Johnson, P. Shepherd, S. Jones | Dan "DFS" Johnson | 4:00 |
| 10. | "Stop Drop" | P. Shepherd, D. Johnson | Dan "DFS" Johnson | 2:47 |
| 11. | "Sixth Sense" (featuring Nifty) | P. Shepherd, D. Johnson, C. Christian | Dan "DFS" Johnson | 3:10 |
| 12. | "Where I'm From" (featuring Voyce) | P. Shepherd, D. Johnson, A. Clarke | Dan "DFS" Johnson | 3:44 |
| 13. | "Childhood -interlude-" | P. Shepherd, D. Johnson | Dan "DFS" Johnson | 3:36 |
| 14. | "Something" (featuring Quisha Wint) | P. Shepherd, D. Johnson, K. Wint | Dan "DFS" Johnson | 4:17 |
| 15. | "Tonite" (featuring Heaven) | P. Shepherd, D. Johnson, A. Clarke, J. Macdonald | Dan "DFS" Johnson | 3:36 |
| 16. | "Until The End" (featuring Sean Slaughter) | P. Shepherd, D. Johnson, S. Slaughter | Dan "DFS" Johnson | 3:58 |
| 17. | "Selah" | P. Shepherd, D. Johnson | Dan "DFS" Johnson | 3:40 |
| Total length: | | | | 58:31 |

== Personnel ==
- Executive producers: Dan Johnson
- Co-executive producers: Andrew James and Promise Shepherd
- Recording: Andrew James and Promise
- Mastering and Mastering: DFS Records, Toronto
- Art Direction, Design and Photography: Melanie Greenwood, Vision City

== Awards ==
- 2002 CGMA Covenant Award for Hip-Hop/Rap Song of the Year for "Alright"
