= 2:35 PM =

Studio album by Calvin Richardson
- Released: September 16, 2003
- Length: 48:29
- Label: Hollywood
- Producer: Calvin Richardson; Darren Lighty; DJ Eddie F; Jake & Trev; Mike City; Raphael Saadiq; Slum Village; The Underdogs

Calvin Richardson chronology
| Country Boy (1999) | 2:35 PM (2003) | When Love Comes (2008) |

Singles from 2:35 PM
- 1. "I've Got to Move" Released: 2003; 2. "Keep on Pushin'" Released: 2003; 3. "Not Like This" Released: 2004

2:35 PM is the second studio album American singer-songwriter Calvin Richardson. It was released on September 16, 2003, via Hollywood Records. Titled after the time of day that his son Souljah was born, production on the album was handled by Raphael Saadiq, Slum Village, Darren Lighty, DJ Eddie F, Jake & Trev, Mike City and The Underdogs, with co-producers Jake and the Phatman and Jon Lind serving as additional producer. 2:35 PM also features a guest appearance from Slum Village.

The album earned largely positive reviews from music critics who complimented Richardson's vocal and producing talents, though some found that 2:35 PM was uneven and formulaic. The album debuted at number 65 on the US Billboard 200 and number 8 on the US Top R&B/Hip-Hop Albums. While none of its singles managed to reach the Billboard Hot 100, lead single "Keep on Pushin'" made it to number 20 on the Adult R&B Airplay, with follow-up "Not Like This" peaking at number 36 on the same chart.

== Background ==
In 1999, Richardson released his solo debut album, Country Boy, through Universal Records. The project was met with mild success and the singer soon was dropped by the label. In December 2001, he signed with Hollywood Records. Less limited in terms of control and direction, Richardson took the lead and set the pace on his second album, producing and writing the majority of the material which he described as "old- school soul with a contemporary bent." In addition, he consulted Raphael Saadiq as well as Slum Village, Mike City and The Underdogs as well as Darren Lighty and Eddie F as guest producers. The latter duo produced the solo version of the Richardson-penned "More Than a Woman," a song which Richardson initially performed as a duet with Angie Stone on her Mahogany Soul (2001) album.

== Critical reception ==
Professional ratings
Review scores
| Source | Rating |
|---|---|
| AllMusic | 3/5 stars |
| The Guardian | 4/5 stars |
| Vibe | 3/5 stars |

Beccy Lindon of The Guardian praised the album with four out of possible five stars, saying "from his granular vocal in "Keep on Pushin'" to the lover's promise of "Cross My Heart", he sounds like a soul legend in the making." AllMusic's Alex Henderson rated the album three stars out of five, found that 2:35 PM "isn't in a class with Patterson or D'Angelo's best releases; actually, it's mildly uneven and inconsistent. However, the CD's best tracks demonstrate that Richardson is capable of excellence when he puts his mind to it [...] Unfortunately, 2:35 PM also has its share of material that is competent without being terribly memorable, but when Richardson does hit the mark, it is obvious that the R&B world should continue to keep an eye on the North Carolina native".

PopMatters critic Mark Anthony Neal found that 2:35 PM was "less moody – less country or southern as Outkast would put it – than Country Boy, but where Richardson trades off on some of that Joe Simon and Johnnie Taylor flow, the disc is as close to that down-home R&B that mainstream pop has seen in some time [...] More artful than folks like Joe and Gerald Levert, but possessing less vocal range and talent than Maxwell, Calvin Richardson belongs to the lunch-pail wing of contemporary male R&B singers — passionate, real, thoughtful, and hardworking. Vibe editor Ernest Hardy felt that 2:35 PM "treads overly familiar romantic ground at times, with no interesting twists on the subject matter. Coupled with the almost unvaried midtempo, the collection tiptoes on the edge of monotony [but] Richardson clearly has the craft of soul music down, and when he decides to dig deeper lyrically, he'll strike gold."

== Commercial performance ==
2:35 PM debuted and peaked at number 65 on the US Billboard 200 in the week of September 27, 2003, becoming Richardson's first and only project to date to chart on the Billboard 200. The album also reached number eight on Billboard's Top R&B/Hip-Hop Albums, becoming his first top ten entry on the chart. Billboard ranked 2:35 PM 95th on its 2003 Top R&B/Hip-Hop Albums listing.

== Track listing ==
2:35 PM track listing
| No. | Title | Writer(s) | Producer(s) | Length |
|---|---|---|---|---|
| 1. | "Keep on Pushin'" | Calvin Richardson | Richardson | 3:47 |
| 2. | "Falling Out" | Richardson; Charles Ray Wiggins; Robert C. Ozuna, Jr.; Glenn Standridge | Raphael Saadiq; Jake and the Phatman^{[a]} | 4:24 |
| 3. | "I've Got to Move" | Richardson; Joe Carter III; Trevor Job | Jake & Trev | 4:06 |
| 4. | "I'm Worthy" | Richardson | Richardson | 3:56 |
| 5. | "More Than a Woman" | Richardson; Edward Ferrell; Darren Lighty; Balewa Muhammad; Clifton Lighty | Eddie F; Darren Lighty | 5:21 |
| 6. | "Not Like This" | Damon Thomas; Harvey Mason Jr.; Jud Mahoney | The Underdogs; Jon Lind^{[b]} | 4:18 |
| 7. | "She's Got the Love" | Richardson; Wiggins; Ozuna, Jr.; Standridge | Saadiq; Jake and the Phatman^{[a]} | 3:45 |
| 8. | "You Got Me High" (featuring Slum Village) | Richardson; Ralph J. Rice Jr.; R.L. Altman III; Andwele Gardner | Slum Village | 4:10 |
| 9. | "Put My Money on You" | Richardson; Rice Jr. | Young RJ | 3:28 |
| 10. | "Your Love Is" | Richardson | Richardson | 3:10 |
| 11. | "I Wansumo" | Richardson | Richardson | 3:21 |
| 12. | "Cross My Heart" | Michael Flowers | Mike City | 3:30 |
| Total length: | | | | 48:29 |

Notes

- ^{^[a]} denotes co-producer
- ^{^[b]} denotes additional producer

== Personnel ==
- Calvin Richardson — vocals, producer (tracks: 1, 4, 10, 11), executive producer
- Ralph J. "Young RJ" Rice Jr. — rap vocals (track 8), producer (tracks: 8, 9)
- R.L. "T3" Altman III — rap vocals (track 8)
- Charlie Ray "Raphael Saadiq" Wiggins — guitar, bass & producer (tracks: 2, 7)
- Chalmers Edward "Spanky" Alford — guitar (track 2)
- Robert C. "Bobby" Ozuna Jr. — drums & co-producer (tracks: 2, 7), percussion (track 7)
- Glenn Standridge — drums & co-producer (tracks: 2, 7), percussion (track 7)
- Benjamin Wright — conduction & strings arrangement (tracks: 2, 7)
- Charles Veal Jr. — strings (tracks: 2, 7)
- South Central Chamber Orchestra — strings (tracks: 2, 7)
- Joe "Jake" Carter — programming, arrangement, producer, engineering & mixing (track 3)
- Trevor Job — programming, arrangement, producer, engineering & mixing (track 3)
- Kelvin Wooten — keyboards (track 7)
- Patrick Park — guitar (track 10)
- Kenny Muhammad — vocal percussion (track 11)
- Michael "Mike City" Flowers — programming & producer (track 12)
- Erick Walls — guitar programming (track 12)
- Edward "DJ Eddie F" Ferrell — producer & mixing (track 5)
- Darren Lighty — producer (track 5)
- Damon Thomas — producer (track 6)
- Harvey Mason Jr. — producer (track 6)
- Jon Lind — additional producer (track 6)
- Kent Hitchcock — engineering (tracks: 1, 10, 11)
- Gerry "The Gov" Brown — engineering & mixing (tracks: 2, 7)
- Nat "Gizmo" Robinson — engineering & mixing (track 5)
- John Tanksley — engineering assistant (tracks: 2, 7)
- Erick Ferrell — engineering assistant (track 5)
- Kevin Perry — engineering assistant (track 5)
- Seth Waldmann — engineering assistant (track 6)
- Peter Mokran — mixing (tracks: 1, 6, 10–12)
- Prince Charles Alexander — mixing (track 3)
- Kin Bengoa — mixing assistant (track 3)
- Jesse "Biz" Stewart — recording (track 12)
- Brian Gardner — mastering
- Willie Young — executive producer, management
- Bob Cavallo — executive producer
- Jeri Heiden — art direction
- Glen Nakasako — design
- Anthony Mandler — photography
- David Snow — creative director
- Geoffrey Weiss — A&R

== Charts ==
=== Weekly charts ===
Weekly chart performance for 2:35 PM
| Chart (2003) | Peak position |
|---|---|
| US Billboard 200 | 65 |
| US Top R&B/Hip-Hop Albums (Billboard) | 8 |

=== Year-end charts ===
Year-end chart performance for 2:35 PM
| Chart (2003) | Position |
|---|---|
| US Top R&B/Hip-Hop Albums (Billboard) | 95 |

== Release history ==
2:35 PM release history
| Region | Date | Format | Label | Ref(s) |
|---|---|---|---|---|
| United States | September 16, 2003 | CD; digital download | Hollywood | |
