= More Than Music =

Studio album by Promise
- Released: August 8, 2008
- Recorded: 2006–2008
- Genre: hip hop
- Length: 54:58
- Labels: DFS Records, Indiepool Distribution
- Producers: Dan "DFS" Johnson, Tony Stone, Chizzy, Randy Hood, Soulsearchin'

Promise chronology
The Promise That Heaven Kept (2003)	More Than Music (2008)	Awakening (2011)

Singles from More Than Music
- 1. "In God We Trust" Released: April 18, 2008; 2. "Change" Released: November 29, 2008

More Than Music is the second studio album by Canadian recording artist Promise, it was released on August 8, 2008. The album features guest appearances from Elzhi (of Slum Village), Shad K, Royce Da 5'9" and others. The album was released by independent record label DFS Records.

== Track listing ==
No.	Title	Writer(s)	Producer(s)	Length
1.	"Intro"	V. Kanhai, A. Bedawl, K. Arzbach, P. Shepherd	Soulsearchin'	0:40
2.	"Change" (featuring Mr. Probz, Supastition, Royce Da 5'9")	D. Johnson, P. Shepherd, R. Montgomery, K. Moye, D. Stehr	Dan "DFS" Johnson	3.28
3.	"Shy Guy" (featuring Shad K and Olskool Ice-Gre)	D. Johnson, P. Shepherd, S. Kabango, G. Lewis, O. Rivero	Dan "DFS" Johnson	4.42
4.	"In God We Trust" (featuring Elzhi (of Slum Village), J. Ivy, Calvin Richardson)	D. Johnson, P. Shepherd, J. Ivy Richardson II, J. Powers	Dan "DFS" Johnson	4:26
5.	"Could Be You"	M. Williams, P. Shepherd	Chizzy	3:49
6.	"Girl" (featuring Mr. Probz, Jon Hope and Famous)	V. Kanhai, A. Bedawi, K. Arzbach, P. Shepherd, D. Stehr, A Bishop, H. Grigsby	Soulsearchin'	4:10
7.	"True Love" (featuring Ray Robinson)	D. Johnson, P. Shepherd, R. Henry	Dan "DFS" Johnson	4:01
8.	"Spend Some Time" (featuring Melanie Durrant)	T. Shepherd, P. Shepherd, M. Durrant	Tony Stone	3:54
9.	"It Ain't You" (featuring Lathun Grady)	D. Johnson, P. Shepherd, L. Grady	Dan "DFS" Johnson	3:23
10.	"Black Woman" (featuring Prestege, Sy Scott and Montell Jordan)	D. Johnson, P. Shepherd, C. Connell, M. London, M. Jordan, S. Scott	Dan "DFS" Johnson	4:12
11.	"Whatever Girl" (featuring Soul P. and Nemesis)	D. Johnson, P. Shepherd, A, Andreson, N. Spence, C. Dailey	Dan "DFS" Johnson	4:07
12.	"Much More" (featuring Darien Brockington and Prestege)	R. Hood, P. Shepherd, D. Brockington, M. London	Randy Hood	3:57
13.	"Maverick" (featuring Tonex)	M. Williams, P. Shepherd, A. Williams	Chizzy	3:36
14.	"Outro"	T. Shepherd, P. Shepherd	Tony Stone	1:40

Bonus Track
No.	Title	Writer(s)	Producer(s)	Length
15.	"Brotherhood" (featuring Rhymefest, Mikkey and Malik Yusef)	D. Johnson, P. Shepherd, C. Smith, M. Nance, M. Yusef	Dan "DFS" Johnson	5:19
Total length:				54:58

== Personnel ==
- Executive producers: Dan Johnson
- Co-executive producers: Andrew James and Promise Shepherd
- Recording and mixing: Dan Johnson
- Mastering: Sterling Sound Mastering, New York
- Photography: Reesee, Zigga Zagga
- Art Direction and Design: Joel Johnson

== Awards ==
- 2009 CGMA Covenant Award winner for "Rap/Hip-Hop Album of the Year".
