= Brotha =

Single by Angie Stone

from the album Mahogany Soul
- Released: 2001
- Genre: R&B; neo soul
- Length: 4:28
- Label: J
- Songwriters: Angie Stone; Raphael Saadiq; Harold Lilly; Glenn Standridge; Robert C. Ozuna
- Producers: Raphael Saadiq; Jake and the Phatman

Angie Stone singles chronology
| "U Make My Sun Shine" (2001) | "Brotha" (2001) | "Wish I Didn't Miss You" (2002) |

"Brotha" is a song by American singer Angie Stone, which appears on her second studio album, Mahogany Soul (2001). It was written by Stone along with Raphael Saadiq (who also makes a cameo appearance in the music video), Harold Lilly, Glenn Standridge and Robert C. Ozuna, while production was overseen by Saadiq and Jake and the Phatman. Along with the standard version, a remix version of the song, featuring singer Alicia Keys and rapper Eve, was released as the first single from the album.

== Music video ==
The music video for "Brotha", directed by Chris Robinson features cameos by Will Smith, Calvin Richardson, Luther Vandross, Sinbad, Avant and Larenz Tate, and it honors male leaders such as Malcolm X, Martin Luther King Jr., Marvin Gaye, Muhammad Ali and Colin Powell.

== Part II ==
"Brotha" was officially remixed with vocals from American rapper Eve and singer Alicia Keys. Produced by Stone, Keys and musician Kerry "Krucial" Brothers, J Records liked the remix so much that it was rushed to include the track on Stone's album. "Brotha (part 2)" contains a sample of Albert King's "I'll Play the Blues for You".

== Track listing ==
CD Maxi
| No. | Title | Length |
|---|---|---|
| 1. | "Brotha Part II" (Remix Album Version) | 3:45 |
| 2. | "Brotha Part II" (Album Version) | 4:31 |
| 3. | "Brotha Part II" (El B Remix) | 6:12 |
| 4. | "Brotha Part II" (Spen & Karizma Mix) | 7:40 |
| 5. | "Brotha Part II" (Remix Edit) | 4:24 |
| 6. | "Brotha Part II" (Reptile's Cryptotech Remix) | 4:40 |
| 7. | "Brotha Part II" (Video) | 4:31 |

== Charts ==
=== Weekly charts ===
| Chart (2002) | Peak position |
|---|---|
| Belgium (Ultratip Bubbling Under Wallonia) Part II featuring Alicia Keys & Eve | 8 |
| Belgium (Ultratip Bubbling Under Flanders) Part II featuring Alicia Keys & Eve | 5 |
| Netherlands (Dutch Top 40 Tipparade) Part II featuring Alicia Keys & Eve | 6 |
| Netherlands (Single Top 100) Part II featuring Alicia Keys & Eve | 49 |
| Scotland Singles (OCC) Part II featuring Alicia Keys & Eve | 53 |
| Sweden (Sverigetopplistan) Part II featuring Alicia Keys & Eve | 59 |
| UK Singles (OCC) Part II featuring Alicia Keys & Eve | 37 |
| UK Hip Hop/R&B (OCC) Part II featuring Alicia Keys & Eve | 8 |
| US Billboard Hot 100 | 52 |
| US Adult R&B Songs (Billboard) | 3 |
| US Hot R&B/Hip-Hop Songs (Billboard) | 13 |

=== Year-end charts ===
| Chart (2002) | Position |
|---|---|
| US Hot R&B/Hip-Hop Songs (Billboard) | 70 |
