= More Than a Woman (Angie Stone song) =

Single by Angie Stone & Joe

from the album Mahogany Soul
- Released: September 24, 2002
- Length: 4:53
- Label: J
- Songwriter(s): Calvin Richardson; Balewa Muhammad; Eddie Ferrell; Darren Lighty; Clifton Lighty
- Producer(s): Eddie F; D. Lighty

Angie Stone singles chronology
"Wish I Didn't Miss You" (2002)	"More Than a Woman" (2002)	"Bottles & Cans" (2003)

"More Than a Woman" is a song by American R&B singer Angie Stone, released in late 2002. It was written by Calvin Richardson, Balewa Muhammad, Eddie Ferrell, Darren Lighty, and Clifton Lighty and recorded for her second studio album Mahogany Soul (2001), with Ferrell and Darren Lighty producing the song and Richardson having featured vocals. A remixed version of the duet, which saw Richardson's vocals being replaced by Joe, was released as the album's fourth single. It peaked at number four on the US Billboard Adult R&B Songs.

== Background ==
"More Than a Woman" was written by singer Calvin Richardson along with Balewa Muhammad, Eddie Ferrell, Darren Lighty, and Clifton Lighty for what was expected to be released as his second album with Universal Music. When Richardson departed from Universal, Stone approached him to re-record the song with her for her second studio album Mahogany Soul (2001) after hearing his demo while working with Ferrell, promoting them to put a new verse down. In 2002, J Records executive Clive Davis expressed his interest to release the song as a single from Mahogany Soul. For the single version, Richardson's vocals were eventually taken off of the song and replaced by new vocals from fellow R&B singer Joe. Richardson's solo version was released on his 2003 album 2:35 PM.

== Critical reception ==
The song earned largely positive reviews from music critics. The single version of "More Than a Woman" earned Stone and Joe a Grammy Award nomination for Best R&B Performance by a Duo or Group with Vocals at the 45th awards ceremony. This marked Stone's first Grammy nomination. Mark Anthony Neal from PopMatters called the album version of the song "simply brilliant" and "chocolate magic." He found that "More Than a Woman" was a "passionate tribute to "black love" and further wrote: "Throughout the song Stone and Richardson sweetly exchange caramel coated lyrics [but] the passion and camaraderie between the two are most powerful during the song's chorus [...] The joyous, playful and loving exchanges between the two in the song’s lyrics are reminiscent of a "grown up" version of Clint Holmes' "Playground in My Mind"." AllMusic editor Jose F. Promis ranked the song among his highlights on parent album Mahogany Soul.

== Chart performance ==
"More Than a Woman" debuted on the US Adult R&B Songs chart in the week of September 7, 2002. It eventually peaked at number four in the week ending November 9, 2002, becoming Mahogany Soul's third consecutive top five hit on the chart. The song also peaked at number 63 on the US Hot R&B/Hip-Hop Songs chart.

== Charts ==
Weekly chart performance for "More Than a Woman"
Chart (2002)	Peak position
US Adult R&B Songs (Billboard)	4
