= Promise (rapper) =

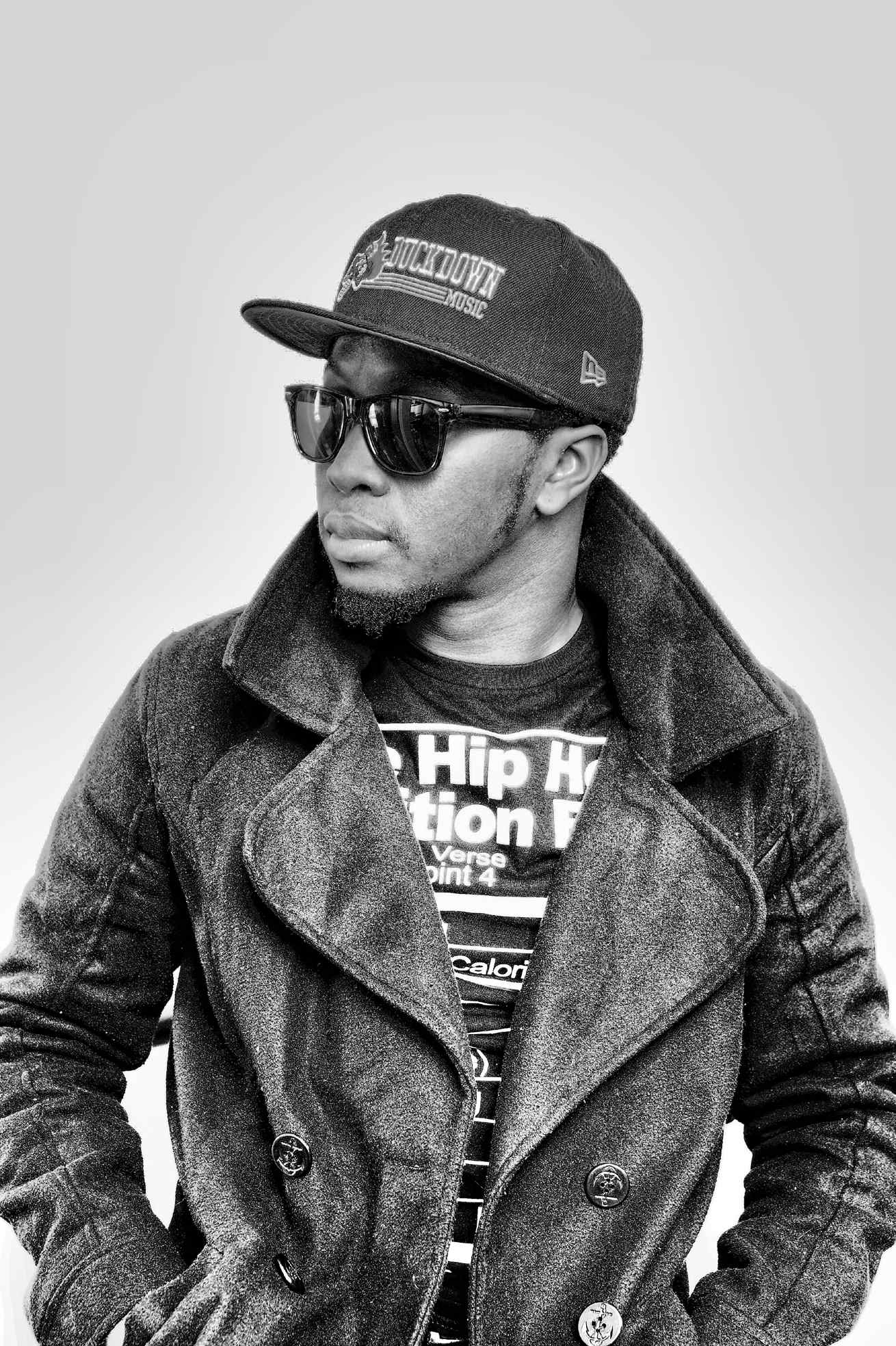

Background information
- Born: Promise JJ Shepherd
- Origin: Toronto, Ontario
- Genres: Hip-hop, soul
- Occupations: Rapper, singer, songwriter
- Years active: 2002–present
- Label: Duck Down Music
- Member of: Perfeck Strangers
- Website: ipromisemusic.com

Promise Shepherd, professionally known as Promise, is a Canadian rapper and singer from Toronto. He is also 1/2 of Hip-Hop supergroup Perfeck Strangers, based in Scarborough, Ontario. Promise has collaborated with Jhené Aiko, Montell Jordan, Saukrates of Big Black Lincoln, PARTYNEXTDOOR, Andy Mineo, LeCrae, No Malice, MC Jin, J. Ivy, Marco Polo, eLZhi of Slum Village, Royce Da 5'9" of Slaughterhouse, Mickey Factz, Rhymefest, and Ton3x. He has also collaborated heavily with fellow Toronto native Drake, whom he met on the set of Degrassi: The Next Generation.

== Discography ==
=== Studio albums ===
- 2002: The Promise That Heaven Kept
- 2008: More Than Music
- 2011: Awakening

=== Extended plays ===
- 2016: TellAVision (EP)

=== Singles ===
- 2003: "Alright"
- 2008: "In God We Trust" (featuring J. Ivy, Calvin Richardson and Elzhi of Slum Village)
- 2008: "Change" (featuring Mr. Probz, Supastition and Royce Da 5'9")
- 2011: "Against the Odds" (featuring Jhené Aiko)
- 2012" "Make a Change"

=== Mixtapes ===
- 2005: "AmiRacle"
- 2006: "Music"
- 2007: "Dj L'oqenz: Kanye West presents Promise Vol.1"
- 2008: "Dj Mensa: Kanye West presents Promise Vol.2"
- 2009: "2dopeboyz Presents: D.O.P.E. Mixtape"

=== Guest appearances ===
- 2004: N.I.F.T.Y. – "The Real" (The Preface EP) featuring Manafest and Promise
- 2006: Manafest – "Critics" (Glory) featuring Promise
- 2008: Tonéx aka Ton3x – "Maverick" featuring Promise
- 2010: Shad – "Time" featuring Promise
- 2010: "The Bridge" (The Stupendous Adventures of Marco Polo) featuring Promise
- 2011: NBA 2K11 OST – "Better Than You" featuring Duck Down All-Stars: Buckshot, Skyzoo and Sean Price (prod. Double-O of Kidz in the Hall) and in video game as character on celebrity list
- 2011: The Get By – "These Girls" (Let Go) Writer credit
- 2011: Buckshot, Smif N' Wessun, Promise – "Run To Remember"
- 2013: Various Artists – "These Girls Too" featuring GMF, Promise, Tona, Rich Kidd and The Get By
- 2014: Da' T.R.U.T.H. – Hope (Official Remix)" featuring This'l, Braille, Derek Minor, Promise

=== With Perfeck Strangers ===
- 2012: "Series Premiere" featuring Justin Nozuka, Wordsworth

== Awards ==
- 2002 CGMA Covenant Award for Hip-Hop/Rap Song of the Year for "Alright"
- 2003 Vibe Award Nominee for Best Hip-Hop/Rap Album of the Year
- 2003 UMAC Award Nominee for Best Gospel Recording for "Alright"
- 2003 Maja Award for Best Urban Gospel
- 2003 Maja Award Nominee for Best Male Artist of the Year
- 2003 Maja Award Nominee for Best New Artist of the Year
- 2007 Shai Award Nominee for Hip-Hop/Rap Album of the Year
- 2009 CGMA Covenant Award for Hip-Hop/Rap Album of the Year for "More Than Music"
