= Facts of Life: The Soul of Bobby Womack =

Studio album by Calvin Richardson
- Released: August 25, 2009
- Length: 48:28
- Label: Shanachie
- Producer: Tres Gilbert

Calvin Richardson chronology
When Love Comes (2008)	Facts of Life: The Soul of Bobby Womack (2009)	America's Most Wanted (2010)

Facts of Life: The Soul of Bobby Womack is the fourth studio album American singer-songwriter Calvin Richardson. It was released by Shanachie Records on August 25, 2009 in the United States. A tribute album dedicated to singer Bobby Womack, Richardson was chosen to record the album to coincide with Womack's induction into the Rock and Roll Hall of Fame. It peaked at number 30 on the US Top R&B/Hip-Hop Albums chart, and garnered two nominations for Best R&B Performance by a Duo or Group with Vocals and Best Traditional R&B Vocal Performance at the 52nd Grammy Awards.

== Critical reception ==
Professional ratings
Review scores
Source	Rating
Allmusic	3.5/5 stars
Creative Loafing	3/5 stars
PopMatters	7/10

AllMusic editor Thom Jurek rated the album three and a half stars out of five and called it a "wildly ambitious but logical step. The dangers in doing a tribute to a legendary artist, especially Womack, one of soul music’s most storied and colorful legends as both a singer and songwriter, is a daunting task. But Richardson’s and Womack’s voices are very similar, though the latter’s is not as rough as the former’s and has more gospel in it, which works very well in adding to most of these songs." Chris Rizik from SoulTracks called Facts of Life an "extremely enjoyable, well performed album that provides a new generation with a glimpse of the body of work of one of the most gifted artists of the prior generation. Those young’ens should be rightfully blown away by Facts of Life."

PopMatters critic Tyler Lewis found that "from an artistic standpoint, this is clearly a project that is special for Richardson. That is probably why he doesn’t mess with perfection, by covering the songs and recording with actual musicians, which gives the album the kind of texture missing from even the best soul music recorded now. That he doesn’t really mess anything up (although he sounds oddly out of his depth on album opener “Across 110th Street”) is a testament to just how beautiful a singer he is. But there is just no denying that he has sounded just as good, if not better, on his own material." Writing for Creative Loafing, L. Michael Gipson wrote that "Richardson’s commitment to traditional interpretations of this popular material highlights Womack’s skill as a lyricist and arranger on par with Barry White, Leon Ware and Willie Hutch [...] Try as Richardson might — and he tries hard here — he just doesn’t have that enviable problem."

== Commercial performance ==
Facts of Life: The Soul of Bobby Womack debuted at number 30 on the US Top R&B/Hip-Hop Albums chart in the week of September 18, 2010. It marked his lowest-charting project by then. The album also debuted number 50 on Billboard's Independent Albums chart.

== Track listing ==
All tracks produced by Tres Gilbert.

Facts of Life: The Soul of Bobby Womack track listing
No.	Title	Writer(s)	Length
1.	"Across 110th Street"	Bobby Womack	3:54
2.	"You're Welcome, Stop On By"	Womack; Truman Thomas	3:55
3.	"Harry Hippie"	Jim Ford	4:03
4.	"Woman Got to Have It"	Darryl Carter; Linda Cooke; Womack	3:49
5.	"American Dream"	Womack; Jim Ford	4:35
6.	"Daylight"	Womack; Harold Payne	3:23
7.	"That's the Way I Feel About Cha"	Womack; John Grisby; Joseph Hicks	4:47
8.	"Love Has Finally Come at Last" (featuring Ann Nesby)	Womack; Patrick Moten	5:17
9.	"I Can Understand It"	Womack	4:47
10.	"I'm Through Trying to Prove My Love to You"	Womack	4:16
11.	"Fact of Life"/"He'll Be There When the Sun Goes Down"	Womack	5:43
Total length:			55:31

== Personnel ==
Performers and musicians

- Evan Bendit – saxophone
- Ron Benner – violin
- Michael Burton – saxophone
- Jorel "Jfly" Flynn – drums, percussion
- Justin Gilbert – clavinet, organ
- Tres Gilbert – bass
- Latonya G. Givens – backing vocalist
- Charles Gray – violin
- Tony Hightower – backing vocalist
- Artia E. Lockett – backing vocalist
- Tony Otero – engineer
- Derek Scott – guitar
- John Raymond – trumpet
- Calvin Richardson – lead vocals
- Derek Scott – guitar
- Twin Cities Horns – horns
- Justin Verhasselt – trombone

Technical

- Ron Benner – mixing engineer
- Lance Conrad – recording engineer
- Tres Gilbert – mixing engineer, producer
- Randall Grass – executive producer
- Timothy Lee – executive producer
- Paul Marino – recording engineer
- Calvin Richardson – associate executive producer

== Charts ==
Weekly chart performance for Facts of Life: The Soul of Bobby Womack
Chart (2009)	Peak position
US Independent Albums (Billboard)	50
US Top R&B/Hip-Hop Albums (Billboard)	30

== Release history ==
Facts of Life: The Soul of Bobby Womack release history
Region	Date	Format	Label	Ref(s)
United States	August 25, 2009	CD; digital download	Shanachie	
