= Wish I Didn't Miss You =

2002 single by Angie Stone

Single by Angie Stone

from the album Mahogany Soul
- B-side: "Gotta Get to Know You Better"
- Released: February 25, 2002
- Length: 4:30
- Label: J
- Songwriters: Andrea Martin; Ivan Matias; Leon Huff; Gene McFadden; John Whitehead
- Producers: Ivan Matias; Andrea Martin

Angie Stone singles chronology
"Brotha" (2002)	"Wish I Didn't Miss You" (2002)	"More Than a Woman" (2002)

"Wish I Didn't Miss You" is a song by American recording artist Angie Stone. It was written and produced by Ivan Matias and Andrea Martin for Stone's second studio album, Mahogany Soul (2001). The song features a sampled composition of the O'Jays's 1972 record "Back Stabbers" as written by Leon Huff, Gene McFadden, and John Whitehead.

"Wish I Didn't Miss You" became a hit in several countries, peaking at number seven in Australia and entering the top 20 in the Flanders region of Belgium and Romania. In the United States, the song's remixes topped the Billboard Dance Club Play chart. It was the last song played at Space nightclub in Ibiza before its initial closing, on October 3, 2016; it was played by Carl Cox.

== Background ==
"Wish I Didn't Miss You" was written by Andrea Martin and Ivan Matias. It contains elements of American R&B group the O'Jays's 1972 record "Back Stabbers" as written by Leon Huff, Gene McFadden, and John Whitehead. Due to the sample, Huff, McFadden and Whitehead are also credited as songwriters on "Wish I Didn't Miss You." When the Matias/Martin demo of the song was sent to Stone, she expressed dislike for it. With much of the recording sessions for her second album Mahogany Soul already finished, Stone did not feel the need to cut any additional songs. Though it would delay the album's release, J Records executive Clive Davis eventually persuaded her to record it. Stone, along with Swizz Beatz, later received co-producer credits on the record. Upon its breakthrough success, the singer grew to like "Wish I Didn't Miss You": "I have to close my every show with that record [and] I love the song now," she said in 2023.

== Critical reception ==
"Wish I Didn't Miss You" earned universal acclaim from music critics. In a review of parent album Mahogany Soul, Jose F. Promis from AllMusic noted that the album's "true gem is the smoldering, gorgeous, aching "Wish I Didn't Miss You," which pulls forward with an unstoppable beat and features a stellar, yearning performance from Miss Stone." Similarly, Barry Walters from Rolling Stone declared it the album's "knockout track." Los Angeles Times critic Robert Hilburn commented on the song: "Built around a killer sample, [...] this tale of struggling to break free from the spell of an old relationship is as stylish and seductive as the best of '60s and '70s soul music that inspired it." The Washington Post wrote: "After hearing a tune as feverish as "Wish I Didn't Miss You," one could bet that Angie Stone knows a thing or two about sweltering summers [...] Sampling the sweaty rim shots and hazy guitar licks of the O'Jays classic "Back Stabbers" to marvelous effect, Stone's exquisite voice hits the track like cool rain on hot pavement as she dives into the lovelorn chorus." Spin magazine ranked the song among the 20 best singles of 2002 and wrote: "If Angie were skinny, Whitney would be unnecessary and Mary J. would be worried. Sad but true."

=== Accolades ===
Accolades for "Wish I Didn't Miss You"
Publication	Accolade	Editor	Rank	Ref.
Billboard	The 100 Greatest Songs of 2002	Staff	46	
Billboard	Top 10 Dance Club Songs Year-by-Year (2002)	Staff	3	
Spin	Singles of the Year (2002)	Staff	11	

== Chart performance ==
Remixed by Hex Hector and Mac Quayle, "Wish I Didn't Miss You" became a successful club hit and gay anthem. The song's remixes topped the US Billboard Dance Club Play chart.

== Track listings ==
US 12-inch single

A1. "Wish I Didn't Miss You" (long version) – 4:31
B1. "Wish I Didn't Miss You" (instrumental) – 4:35
B2. "Wish I Didn't Miss You" (a cappella) – 4:30

US 12-inch single (The Remixes)

A1. "Wish I Didn't Miss You" (Hex Hector / Mac Quayle club mix) – 9:54
A2. "Wish I Didn't Miss You" (Hex Hector / Mac Quayle Vibe mix) – 7:55
B1. "Wish I Didn't Miss You" (Pound Boys Stoneface Bootleg mix) – 7:51
B2. "Brotha" (Spen & Karizma club mix) – 7:40

UK CD single

1. "Wish I Didn't Miss You" (album version) – 4:33
2. "Wish I Didn't Miss You" (Hex Hector / Mac Quayle Mixshow) – 5:43
3. "Gotta Get to Know You Better" – 5:00
4. "Wish I Didn't Miss You" (video) – 4:05

UK 12-inch single

A1. "Wish I Didn't Miss You" (album version) – 4:33
A2. "Wish I Didn't Miss You" (Hex Hector / Mac Quayle Mixshow) – 5:43
B1. "Wish I Didn't Miss You" (Pound Boys Stoneface Bootleg mix) – 7:51

European CD single

1. "Wish I Didn't Miss You" (album version) – 4:33
2. "Gotta Get to Know You Better" – 5:00

European maxi-CD single

1. "Wish I Didn't Miss You" (album version) – 4:33
2. "Wish I Didn't Miss You" (radio vibe mix) – 3:30
3. "Wish I Didn't Miss You" (Pound Boys Stoneface Bootleg mix) – 7:51
4. "Gotta Get to Know You Better" – 5:00

Australian CD single

1. "Wish I Didn't Miss You" (Hot mix radio) – 4:19
2. "Wish I Didn't Miss You" (Hex Hector / Mac Quayle club mix) – 9:54
3. "Wish I Didn't Miss You" (Hex Hector / Mac Quayle vibe mix) – 7:55
4. "Wish I Didn't Miss You" (Pound Boys Stoneface Bootleg mix) – 7:51
5. "Brotha" (Spen & Karizma club mix) – 7:40

== Personnel ==
Personnel are lifted from the liner notes of Mahogany Soul.

- Ivan Matias – production, writing
- Andrea Martin – backing vocals, production, writing
- Leon Huff – writing (sample)
- Joe Kwimbee – bass, guitar
- Gene McFadden – writing (sample)
- Flip Osmond – engineering assistance
- Angie Stone – co-production, lead vocals
- John Whitehead – writing (sample)
- Swizz Beatz – co-production
- Tony Maserati – mixing engineer

== Charts ==
=== Weekly charts ===
Weekly chart performance for "Wish I Didn't Miss You"
Chart (2002)	Peak position
Australia (ARIA)	7
Australian Club Chart (ARIA)	1
Australian Dance (ARIA)	2
Belgium (Ultratop 50 Flanders)	19
Belgium (Ultratip Bubbling Under Wallonia)	3
Europe (Eurochart Hot 100)	76
Germany (GfK)	94
Ireland (IRMA)	28
Netherlands (Dutch Top 40 Tipparade)	5
Netherlands (Single Top 100)	45
Romania (Romanian Top 100)	16
Scottish Singles Sales (Official Charts)	54
UK Singles (Official Charts)	30
UK Hip Hop/R&B (Official Charts)	7
US Billboard Hot 100	79
US Dance Club Songs (Billboard) The Remixes	1
US Dance Singles Sales (Billboard) The Remixes	11
US Hot R&B/Hip-Hop Songs (Billboard)	31

=== Year-end charts ===
Year-end chart performance for "Wish I Didn't Miss You"
Chart (2002)	Position
Australian Club Chart (ARIA)	35
Australian Dance (ARIA)	17
Belgium (Ultratop 50 Flanders)	67
US Dance Club Play (Billboard)	3
US Hot R&B/Hip-Hop Singles & Tracks (Billboard)	81

== Certifications ==
Certifications for "Wish I Didn't Miss You"
Region	Certification	Certified units/sales
New Zealand (RMNZ)	Gold	15,000^{‡}
United Kingdom (BPI) Sales since 2004	Platinum	600,000^{‡}
^{‡} Sales+streaming figures based on certification alone.

== Release history ==
Release history and formats for "Wish I Didn't Miss You"
Region	Date	Format(s)	Label(s)	Ref.
United States	February 25, 2002	Rhythmic contemporary; urban radio	J	
Australia	June 3, 2002	CD	J	
Denmark	June 17, 2002	CD	J	
Sweden	June 17, 2002	CD	J	
United Kingdom	July 15, 2002	12-inch vinyl; CD	J	
