= They-Say Vision =

Single by Res

from the album How I Do
- Released: 2002
- Genre: Pop rock
- Length: 3:36
- Songwriters: Doc McKinney; Santi White; Res
- Producer: Doc McKinney

Res singles chronology
"Golden Boys" (2001)	"They-Say Vision" (2002)

"They-Say Vision" is a song by American hip-hop singer Res, released as the second single from her debut studio album, How I Do (2001). A pop-rock song that was regarded as defying any genre-based radio format, the song's lyrics focus on nonconformity.

The single was commercially released in 2002, the year following the release of How I Do, and received praise from music critics both at the time and in retrospect. It became Res's first commercially successful single in the United States, entering four Billboard singles charts, and topping one of them, the Dance Club Songs chart, in May 2002. It also peaked within the top 40 of the Bubbling Under Hot 100 singles chart, an extension of the Hot 100, and the Mainstream Top 40 pop airplay chart. An accompanying music video went into rotation on MTV and VH1. The single's success was also partly credited with driving an increase in sales for How I Do almost a year after the record's release.

== Composition ==
The song has been described as a "restless, shuffling ode to nonconformity." The song's opening lyrics are "I wanna try that pill that people take/Make you believe all the things that people say."

== Critical reception ==
Upon its release, the song drew praise from contemporary music critics. In the issue of Billboard dated March 23, 2002, the song received a "Pick" designation, and critic Chuck Taylor wrote that "this is a clever track, one that resonates after the last note has faded."

In 2007, the song was the subject of a column in Entertainment Weekly, titled "Why Wasn't This a Huge Hit?" Music critic Michael Slezak hypothesized that the song's lack of commercial success could be explained by the fact that "Res’ music just didn't fit comfortably enough into any pre-approved radio format."

== Music video ==
The song's music video went into rotation on VH1 and MTV in April 2002, reaching number 29 on MTV's rotation chart and number 27 on VH1's rotation chart in the week ending April 21, 2002. In her 2016 memoirs, You Can't Touch My Hair: And Other Things I Still Have to Explain, comedian Phoebe Robinson said that the music video inspired her, writing that "As soon as I saw Res, I was like who is this kick-ass woman? This bare-midriffed, dark-chocolate-colored beauty who sang a hybrid of rock/hip-hop music all while sporting the most magnificent dreadlocks [....] She never got the praise or attention she deserved, despite being gorgeous and talented. She became an underdog hero to me."

== Chart performance ==
"They-Say Vision" achieved modest success in the United States, charting on four Billboard music charts. On April 27, 2002, the song debuted at number 24 on the Bubbling Under Hot 100 chart; the next week, it reached its peak of number 19 on that chart. In its third & final week on that chart, the song fell to number 24.

The song also gave Res her first and only entry on the Billboard Mainstream Top 40 chart. "They-Say Vision" debuted at number 40 on the chart dated April 6, 2002. On the chart dated May 4, 2002, the song peaked at number 33 on the chart. On the Billboard Dance Club Songs, the single peaked at number one on May 25, 2002. Its success was regarded as one reason that its parent album experienced a gain in popularity almost a year after its release.

== Track listings and formats ==
- US CD Single
1. "They-Say Vision" (Radio Edit) – 3:25
2. "They-Say Vision" (LP Version) – 3:36
3. "They-Say Vision" (Instrumental) – 3:36
4. "They-Say Vision" (A Capella) – 3:33
- Europe CD Single
1. "They-Say Vision" (Radio Edit) – 3:25
2. "They-Say Vision" (LP Version) – 3:36

- Japan CD Single
1. "They-Say Vision" (Album Version) – 3:36
2. "They-Say Vision" (Instrumental) – 3:36
3. "Say It Anyway" – 2:51
- US 12" promo vinyl
1. "They-Say Vision" (Robbie Rivera's Vocal Mix Part Two) – 6:52
2. "They-Say Vision" (Giuseppe D Remix) – 8:12
3. "They-Say Vision" (DJ Encore Remix) – 5:51
4. "They-Say Vision" (Robbie Rivera's Peak Tribal Session Dub) – 8:06

== Charts ==
Chart (2002)	Peak position
US Bubbling Under Hot 100 (Billboard)	19
US Dance Club Songs (Billboard)	1
US Pop Airplay (Billboard)	33
