= America's Most Wanted (album) =

Studio album by Calvin Richardson
- Released: August 31, 2010
- Length: 42:40
- Label: Shanachie
- Producer: Eric Brice; Joe Lindsay; Desmond Lockhart; Bob Perry; Calvin Richardson

Calvin Richardson chronology
Facts of Life: The Soul of Bobby Womack (2009)	America's Most Wanted (2010)	I Am Calvin (2014)

America's Most Wanted is the fifth studio album American singer-songwriter Calvin Richardson. It was released by Shanachie Records on August 31, 2010. The follow-up to his Bobby Womack tribute album Facts of Life: The Soul of Bobby Womack (2009), it debuted and peaked at number 38 on the US Top R&B/Hip-Hop Albums chart, and earned Richardson another Grammy Award nomination for Best Traditional R&B Vocal Performance at the 53rd Annual Grammy Awards.

== Critical reception ==
Professional ratings
Review scores
Source	Rating
AllMusic	3/5 stars
Billboard	4/5 stars
PopMatters	8/10

Tyler Lewis, writing for PopMatters, called America's Most Wanted "Richardson’s most consistent album to date. He is supported beautifully by real live instruments and great vocal arrangements that give the songs a texture and movement that you just don’t hear much anymore. With America’s Most Wanted Calvin Richardson shows that, five albums into a very strong career, he is really hitting his stride." SoulTracks editor L. Michael Gipson felt that "Richardson and co-producer Robert Perry have definitely crafted some solid Southern soul with a handful of urban AC songs that do indeed have more universal appeal."

Billboard noted that "there’s nothing forced or fake about Calvin Richardson‘s vocal talent; his voice naturally exudes soul. And when it comes to songwriting, Richardson definitely knows his way around a strong song." The magazine found that despite some "hiccups" such as "repetitive and formulaic selections" as "You Possess My Body" and "Thug Livin'," [...] Richardson's latest effort brings him another step closer to deservedly becoming one of America's most wanted soul singers." AllMusic editor Thom Jurek rated the album three stars out of five. He wrote that "there are some fine tracks here that move beyond Richardson's trademarked, well-traveled Southern soul revivalism. Some of the more urban AC offerings here are oriented for the summer dancefloor season [...] In sum, the pluses on America's Most Wanted outnumber the minuses and Richardson's profile should rise as a result."

== Commercial performance ==
America's Most Wanted debuted at number 38 on the US Top R&B/Hip-Hop Albums chart in the week of September 18, 2010. It marked his lowest-charting project by then. The album also reached number 49 on Billboard's Independent Albums chart.

== Track listing ==
America's Most Wanted track listing
No.	Title	Writer(s)	Producer(s)	Length
1.	"America's Most Wanted"	Arnold Mishklunig; Bob Perry; Borahm Lee; Calvin Richardson; Gintas Janusonis; Josh Werner; Wes Mingus	Perry	3:50
2.	"Never Do You Wrong"	Mishklunig; Perry; Lee; Richardson; Janusonis; Werner; Mingus	Perry	4:30
3.	"Feels Like We're Sexin'"	Mishklunig; Perry; Lee; Richardson; Janusonis; Werner; Mingus	Perry	3:51
4.	"You're So Amazing"	Richardson	Richardson; Perry^{[a]}	3:40
5.	"Thug Livin'"	Richardson; Eric Brice; Joe Lindsay	Richardson; Brice; Lindsay	4:26
6.	"Come Over"	Mishklunig; Perry; Lee; Richardson; Janusonis; Werner; Mingus	Perry	4:13
7.	"You Possess My Body"	Richardson	Richardson; Perry^{[a]}	3:46
8.	"Reach Out"	Richardson	Richardson	3:52
9.	"Adore You"	Mishklunig; Perry; Lee; Richardson; Janusonis; Werner; Mingus	Perry	3:25
10.	"Monday Morning"	Richardson	Richardson; Perry^{[a]}	3:53
11.	"Paradise"	Richardson; Desmond Lockhart	Richardson; Lockhart	3:14
Total length:				42:40

Notes

- ^{^[a]} denotes additional producer

== Personnel ==
Credits adapted from the liner notes of America's Most Wanted.

- Lorien Babajian – package design
- Eric Brice – producer
- Dave Darlington – mixing engineer
- Randall Grass – executive producer
- Scott Huffman – photography
- Joe Lindsay – producer
- Desmond Lockhart – producer
- Boy Perry – producer
- Calvin Richardson – arranger, producer, vocals
- Kevin Terrell – photography
- Robert Vosgien – mastering engineer

== Charts ==
Weekly chart performance for America's Most Wanted
Chart (2010)	Peak position
US Independent Albums (Billboard)	49
US Top R&B/Hip-Hop Albums (Billboard)	38

== Release history ==
America's Most Wanted release history
Region	Date	Format	Label	Ref(s)
United States	August 31, 2010	CD; digital download	Shanachie	
