= Awakening (Promise album) =

Studio album by Promise
- Released: June 28, 2011
- Recorded: 2010–2011
- Genre: Hip hop
- Length: 59:10
- Labels: Duck Down Music, E1 Entertainment Distribution
- Producers: E. Jones, B20, Jordan Manswell, Scena, The Arcitype, Realblazemusic, LordQuest, Ric Notes, King P, Genesis, Dave Orrett

Promise chronology
'More Than Music' (2008)	Awakening (2011)

Singles from Awakening
- 1. "Against The Odds (featuring Jhené Aiko)" Released: June 21, 2011

Awakening is the third studio album by Canadian recording artist Promise Shepherd, it was released on June 28, 2011.The album features guest appearances from The World Famous Tony Williams, Jhené Aiko, J. Ivy and others. The album was released by Duck Down Music.

== Track listing ==
No.	Title	Writer(s)	Producer(s)	Length
1.	"The Wake"	P. Shepherd, O. Lee, E. Jones	E. Jones	2:34
2.	"Clark Kent"	P. Shepherd, J. Robinson, J. Manswell	J. Manswell	3.53
3.	"Something Better"	P. Shepherd, O. Lee, B. Tombe	B20	3:57
4.	"HereAfter" (featuring Ebrahim and Greg Sczebel)	P. Shepherd, R. Miller, C. Meesan	Scena	3:40
5.	"Everyone Knows" (featuring Peter Katz and The World Famous Tony Williams)	P. Shepherd, J. Young, W. Hashmi, I. Martins, G. Munro, J. Record	Realblazemusic	3:50
6.	"Back When (Things Were Simple)"	P. Shepherd, G. Munro, J. Fulop	The Arcitype	4:05
7.	"Against The Odds" (featuring Jhené Aiko)	P. Shepherd, J. Chilombo, J. Young, W. Hashmi	Realblazemusic	4:05
8.	"Gonna Make It"	P. Shepherd, J. Fulop	The Arcitype	4:23
9.	"Somebody Else" (featuring Slakah the Beatchild)	P. Shepherd, J. Nuamah, B. Joseph, B. Tombe	LordQuest	3:04
10.	"Don't + Daddy's Girl -interlude-"	P. Shepherd, J. Young, W. Hashmi, R. Del Mundo, G. Ransome	Realblazemusic, Ric Notes	6:41
11.	"Daddy's Girl"	P. Shepherd, M. Lodge	King P	3:10
12.	"Down"	P. Shepherd, C. Connell, O Lunan	Genesis	3:26
13.	"HeartStrings"	P. Shepherd, C. Connell, Y. Watts	Genesis	3:33
14.	"Daydreamin'"	P. Shepherd, B. Tombe	B20	3:48
15.	"Memories" (featuring Liya)	P. Shepherd, C. Connell, G. Munro	Genesis	3:57
16.	"Skin Deep"	P. Shepherd, J. Richardson, G. Munro, D. Orrett	Dave Orrett	5:29
Total length:				59:10

== Personnel ==
- Executive producer: Promise Shepherd
- Recording engineer/vocal producer: Promise
- Mixing: Promise, Tariq Adi
- Mastering: Proof Of Purchase Mixing, Burlington
- Art Direction, Design and Photography: RMe, MsUnderstood Photography
- Additional Vocals: O'Sound, Regular Robb, Josh Record, Grier Munro, Liya, Brendan Philip, Omar "Oh!" Lunan, Yonatan Watts, Duane Forrest, J. Ivy, Luke Weaver

== Awards ==
- 2012 CGMA Covenant Award for Hip-Hop/Rap Album of the Year
- 2013 Glass Awards Nominee for Hip-Hop/Rap Album of the Year
