= Mahogany Soul =

Studio album by Angie Stone
- Released: October 16, 2001
- Studio: Battery, New York City (Note: Tracks 1, 3, 5, 11, 13 and 15); Chung King, New York City (Note: Tracks 1, 5, 6, 8, 12, 14–16 and 18); Jammin', New York City (Note: Tracks 1, 3, 12, 15 and 16); Skip Saylor Recording, Northridge, California (Note: Tracks 2 and 10); Enterprise, Burbank, California (Note: Track 2); The Record Plant, Hollywood, California (Note: Additional recording on track 2); The Hit Factory, New York City (Note: Tracks 3 and 4); Playground/MiniMansion, Closter, New Jersey (Note: Track 4); The Tracken Place, Hollywood, California (Note: Track 7); Motion Sound Recording, New York City (Note: Tracks 8, 14 and 18); The Studio, Philadelphia (Note: Track 9); Glowy, West Orange, New Jersey (Note: Track 10); Circle of 5ths Digital, New York City (Note: Track 13); KrucialKeys, New York City (Note: Track 17); Quad, New York City
- Genre: Neo soul; R&B
- Length: 74:58
- Label: J
- Producer: Angie Stone; Ivan "Orthodox" Barias; Rufus Blaq; Kerry "Krucial" Brothers; Warryn "Baby Dubb" Campbell; Eddie F; Carvin "Ransum" Haggins; Jason Hariston; Gerald "Da Clean Up Man" Isaac; Darren Lighty; Aaron "Freedom" Lyles; Jake and the Phatman; Andrea Martin; Ivan Matias; Ali Shaheed Muhammad; Raphael Saadiq; Swizz Beatz; Chucky T; Eran Tabib

Angie Stone chronology
Black Diamond (1999)	Mahogany Soul (2001)	Stone Love (2004)

Singles from Mahogany Soul
- 1. "Brotha" Released: September 25, 2001; 2. "Brotha Part II" Released: December 4, 2001; 3. "Wish I Didn't Miss You" Released: June 24, 2002; 4. "More Than a Woman" Released: September 24, 2002; 5. "Bottles & Cans" Released: 2003

Mahogany Soul is the second studio album by American singer Angie Stone. It was first released in the United States on October 16, 2001, by J Records. Conceived after her departure from Arista, the transition allowed Stone to exert more artistic control over the album for which she enlisted a variety of producers and songwriters, including Raphael Saadiq, Warryn Campbell, Ali Shaheed Muhammad, Chucky Thompson, Swizz Beatz, and others, though she co-wrote or produced on most of the material herself.

The album received generally positive reviews by music critics, some of whom would call it a defining moment of the neo soul movement of the early 2000s as well as Stone's masterpiece in the years after. It debuted and peaked at number 22 on the Billboard 200, reaching Gold status in the United States, and entered the top ten in Finland and the top 20 in Belgium and the Netherlands, becoming the singer's highest-charting international success. By 2004, the album has sold more than a million copies worldwide.

Mahogany Soul spawned four singles, three of which became her biggest hits, including the R&B top ten hit "Brotha" and its remix "Brotha Part II," featuring singer Alicia Keys and rapper Eve, as well as the Dance Club Songs number-one hit "Wish I Didn't Miss You" and "More Than a Woman," a duet with singer Joe that earned both singers a Grammy Award nomination for Best R&B Performance by a Duo or Group with Vocals at the 45th awards ceremony. In 2002, Stone embarked on the Mahogany Soul Tour.

== Background ==
In 1997, after years of primarily working as a songwriter and arranger, Stone signed with Arista Records and began work on her debut solo album Black Diamond. Released in September 1999, the album catapulted her to the forefront of the neo soul movement of the late-1990s to early-2000s. It produced the R&B top ten hit "No More Rain (In This Cloud)" and earned a Gold certification from the Recording Industry Association of America (RIAA), selling more than 800,000 copies domestically. In 2001, Stone followed Arista head Clive Davis to his new label J Records. The transition allowed her to exert more artistic control over her next album for which enlisted a variety of musicians to work with her, including Raphael Saadiq, Warryn Campbell, Ali Shaheed Muhammad, Chucky Thompson, and others.

Recording of the album started in September 2000. In a 2001 interview with Billboard magazine, she commented on the process: "I was dealing with a brand-new baby — a two-month-old sleeping in the studio as I played and recorded – and post-partum blues, feeling sorry for myself. This album is the grits and the gravy." Stone further described Mahogany Soul as "warmer, with more heartfeld lyrics" and called it a "well-rounded, adult album, with youthful, street sensibilities." In a 2018 interview, she cited the album as her "defining musical achievement," adding: "Mahogany Soul was mostly me. It wasn't watered down by anyone else's help. I had some lyrical help to some degree, but I started it, somebody jumped on the bandwagon and either I finished it or we finished it. But all the concepts and subject matters came from a very, very broken [...] young woman, and a very headstrong woman at the same time."

== Critical reception ==
Professional ratings
Review scores
Source	Rating
AllMusic	4/5 stars
Entertainment Weekly	B−
Los Angeles Times	4/4 stars
The New Rolling Stone Album Guide	4/5 stars
NME	5/10
Robert Christgau	(1-star Honorable Mention)
Rolling Stone	3.5/5 stars
Yahoo! Music UK	6/10

AllMusic editor Jose F. Promis called the album "one of the best R&B albums of 2001". He found that Mahogany Soul "delivers more of the organic, gritty, rootsy yet sophisticated soul which put her on the map as a solo artist. The production is great and the songs are funky, mature, and intelligent, but when she truly shines is when she actually spreads her wings and glides away from her neo-soul trappings, which she manages effortlessly." Similarly, the Los Angeles Times wrote: "There is a sense throughout of real stories, real people, real emotions – and that's as good a definition as any for true soul music. One of the year's most commanding works." Billboard remarked: "Stronger musically and lyrically, Mahogany Soul oozes with heart-warming energy that's simultaneously contemporary and old-school. Stone once again rolls her gospel-honed vocals around real-life issues and emotion-filled lyrics."

Reviewing for PopMatters in October 2001, Mark Anthony Neal hailed Mahogany Soul as "an accomplished piece of R&B music" in a year with other impressive debut albums by singers in the genre, including Alicia Keys' Songs in A Minor, Bilal's 1st Born Second, and Res's How I Do. He highlighted Stone's detailed lyrics, casually sassy "down-home" persona, and use of sophisticated samples in the context of authentic soul music. In response to the popular reception for the lead single "Brotha", Neal said he regards it as a "passionate and thoughtful defense" of African-American men, while pointing out "brutally trenchant" perspectives of men elsewhere in the album's relationship songs. Rolling Stone's Barry Walters found that "like its title suggests, Mahogany Soul isn't flashy [or] even all that catchy [...] Like D'Angelo, Stone specializes in dramatic moods expressed with mellow methods. Give her understated passion time to marinate, and Stone's soul picnic will satisfy."

Entertainment Weekly journalist Tom Sinclair felt that "too often Mahogany falls into the same artistic cul-de-sac that made D'Angelo's Voodoo more admirable than enjoyable; the preponderance of tastefully atmospheric filler topped with melismatic vocal athletics makes Mahogany more so-so than soulful." The Village Voice critic Robert Christgau was less enthusiastic, singling out "Brotha" and "Bottles and Cans" as highlights while finding the album in general to be "longer on groove than song" and "longer on song than the brothas". Stephen Dalton from NME called the album "well-made, but very boring nu-soul stuff." He found that "Stone is stranded in prematurely middle-aged MOR." Writing in 2009 for BBC Online, Daryl Easlea said Mahogany Soul "remains her masterpiece" and called it "a confident musical statement of what it means to be African-American [that] came to define the neo-soul movement of the early 21st century".

=== Year-end lists ===
Appearances on year-end lists for Mahogany Soul
Publication	Accolade	Editor	Rank	Ref.
Billboard	Critic's Choice (2001)	Staff	3	
Rolling Stone	Top Albums of 2001	Steve Knopper	7	
PopMatters	Best of 2001 – Soul	Maurice Bottomley	1	

== Chart performance ==
Mahogany Soul debuted and peaked at number 22 on the US Billboard 200 in the week of November 24, 2001, selling 71,000 copies in its first week of release. It also entered the top five of the Top R&B/Hip-Hop Albums chart, reaching number four. On February 12, 2002, it was certified Gold by the Recording Industry Association of America (RIAA) for shipments of more than 500,000 units. By June 2002, Mahogany Soul had sold 615,783 units in the US and as of September 2003 has sold 758,000 copies domestically. In July 2004, The Advocate reported that the album has sold more than a million copies worldwide.

== Track listing ==
Mahogany Soul track listing
No.	Title	Writer(s)	Producer(s)	Length
1.	"Soul Insurance"	Angie Stone; Eran Tabib	Stone; Tabib	5:00
2.	"Brotha"	Stone; Raphael Saadiq; Harold Lilly; Glenn Standridge; Robert C. Ozuna	Saadiq; Jake and the Phatman^{[a]}	4:28
3.	"Pissed Off"	Stone; Tabib; Rufus Moore; Stephanie Bolton	Stone; Tabib; Chucky T^{[b]}	4:41
4.	"More Than a Woman" (duet with Calvin)	Calvin Richardson; Balewa Muhammad; Eddie Ferrell; Darren Lighty; Clifton Lighty	Eddie F; D. Lighty	4:53
5.	"Snowflakes"	Jason Hariston; Moore; Dino Fekaris; Nick Zesses	Stone; Rufus Blaq^{[a]}; Hariston^{[c]}	3:49
6.	"Wish I Didn't Miss You"	Andrea Martin; Ivan Matias; Leon Huff; Gene McFadden; John Whitehead	Matias; Martin; Stone^{[a]}; Swizz Beatz^{[a]}	4:30
7.	"Easier Said Than Done"	Stone; Lilly; Warryn Campbell; John Smith	Warryn "Baby Dubb" Campbell	3:56
8.	"Bottles & Cans"	Gerald Isaac	Gerald "Da Clean Up Man" Isaac	3:54
9.	"The Ingredients of Love" (duet with Musiq Soulchild)	Stone; Carvin Haggins; Ivan Barias; Taalib Johnson; Freddie Hubbard	Carvin "Ransum" Haggins; Ivan "Orthodox" Barias	3:56
10.	"What U Dyin' For"	Stone; Ali Shaheed Muhammad	Muhammad	5:26
11.	"Makings of You (Interlude)"	Curtis Mayfield	Stone	2:30
12.	"Mad Issues"	Stone; Tabib; Moore	Stone; Tabib	4:49
13.	"If It Wasn't"	Stone; Aaron Burns-Lyles	Stone; Aaron "Freedom" Lyles	4:22
14.	"20 Dollars"	Isaac; Al Green	Isaac	4:42
15.	"Life Goes On"	Stone; Tabib; Petey Pablo	Stone; Tabib; Chucky T^{[b]}	3:57
16.	"The Heat (Outro)"	Stone; Tabib	Stone; Tabib	1:54
17.	"Brotha Part II" (featuring Alicia Keys and Eve)	Stone; Saadiq; Lilly; Standridge; Ozuna; Jerry Beach	Saadiq; Jake and the Phatman^{[a]}; Kerry "Krucial" Brothers^{[d]}	4:02
18.	"Time of the Month"	Isaac	Isaac	4:09
Total length:				74:58

Japanese edition bonus track
No.	Title	Writer(s)	Producer(s)	Length
19.	"Makin' Me Feel"	Saadiq; Stone; Kelvin Wooten; Standridge; Ozuna	Saadiq; Jake and the Phatman^{[a]}	4:08
Total length:				79:06

Notes

- ^{^a} signifies a co-producer
- ^{^b} signifies a programming producer
- ^{^c} signifies an associate producer
- ^{^d} signifies a remixer and additional producer

Sample credits

- "Snowflakes" contains elements from "Let's Make Love Now" by The Supremes and the Four Tops.
- "Wish I Didn't Miss You" contains elements from "Back Stabbers" by The O'Jays.
- "The Ingredients of Love" contains replayed elements from "Red Clay" by Freddie Hubbard.
- "20 Dollars" contains elements from "Simply Beautiful" by Al Green.
- "Brotha Part II" contains excerpts from "I'll Play the Blues for You" by Albert King.
- "Time of the Month" contains replayed elements from "I Can't Say No" by Natalie Cole.

== Personnel ==
Credits adapted from the liner notes of Mahogany Soul.

=== Musicians ===
- Angie Stone – vocals (all tracks); bass, percussion (track 1); background vocals (tracks 1–3, 7, 9, 10–13, 16); Rhodes piano (tracks 3, 13); arrangement (tracks 6, 11); vocal arrangement (track 9); Wurlitzer (tracks 12, 15); crowd participation (track 13)
- Sherena Wynn – background vocals (tracks 1, 11)
- Tenita Dreher – background vocals (tracks 1, 3, 11, 13)
- Stephanie Bolton – background vocals (tracks 1, 3, 11, 13)
- Eran Tabib – drum programming, keyboards (track 1); acoustic guitar (tracks 1, 12, 15); guitars (tracks 3, 13); classical guitar (track 11); drums (track 12); electric guitar (tracks 12, 15); strings (track 15); all instruments (track 16)
- Aubrey Dayle – percussion (track 1)
- Raphael Saadiq – guitars, bass (track 2)
- Harold Lilly – keyboards (track 2); background vocals (tracks 2, 7)
- Jake and the Phatman – turntables, drum programming (track 2)
- Chucky T – drums, bass (tracks 3, 15)
- Daniel Sadownick – percussion (track 3)
- Calvin – vocals (track 4)
- Clifton Lighty – background vocals (track 4)
- Balewa Muhammad – background vocals (track 4)
- Swizz Beatz – arrangement (track 6)
- Joe Kwimbee – bass, guitars (track 6)
- Andrea Martin – background vocals (track 6)
- Warryn "Baby Dubb" Campbell – all instruments (track 7)
- John "Jubu" Smith – guitar (track 7)
- Gerald "Da Clean Up Man" Isaac – arrangement (tracks 8, 14, 18)
- Jonathan DuBose Jr. – guitar (track 8)
- Dewey "Bassman" Browder – bass (track 8)
- Ray Chew – string arrangements, string conducting (track 8)
- Musiq Soulchild – vocals, background vocals, vocal arrangement (track 9)
- Carvin Haggins – vocal arrangement (track 9)
- Jamar Jones – organ, Rhodes piano (track 9)
- Frankie "Rocco" Romano – guitar (track 9)
- Ali Shaheed Muhammad – all instruments (except lead guitar) (track 10)
- Bob Power – lead guitar (track 10)
- Larry Peoples Sr. – bass (track 11); crowd participation (track 13)
- Jamal Peoples – Rhodes piano (track 11); organ (track 13)
- Larry Peoples Jr. – percussion (track 11)
- Rufus Blaq – background vocals (track 12)
- Ivan Neville – Hammond B-3 (track 12)
- Robert Eldridge – tenor saxophone (track 12)
- Reginald Hines – alto saxophone (track 12)
- Paul Litteral – trumpet (track 12)
- Aaron "Freedom" Lyles – Wurlitzer, drums, percussion, crowd participation (track 13)
- E. Serrano – crowd participation (track 13)
- Rodney Davis – additional keyboards (track 14)
- Alicia Keys – vocals (track 17)
- Eve – vocals (track 17)
- Kerry "Krucial" Brothers – all instruments (except bass), digital programming (track 17)
- Rufus Jackson – bass (track 17)
- Eric Lorde – additional keyboards (track 18)

=== Technical ===
- Angie Stone – production (tracks 1, 3, 5, 11–13, 15, 16); co-production (track 6); executive production
- Eran Tabib – production (tracks 1, 3, 12, 15, 16)
- Tim Donovan – engineering (tracks 1, 3, 12, 15, 16); recording (tracks 5, 8, 11, 13, 14); mixing (tracks 11, 13, 15, 16)
- Jon Shriver – engineering (tracks 1, 3, 12, 15, 16)
- Jeremy Mitchell – engineering assistance (tracks 1, 12, 16)
- Rowie Nameri – engineering assistance (track 1)
- Steven Maldonado – engineering assistance (track 1)
- "Prince" Charles Alexander – mixing (tracks 1, 2, 14, 18)
- Richard Furch – mixing assistance (track 1)
- Raphael Saadiq – production (tracks 2, 17)
- Jake and the Phatman – co-production (tracks 2, 17)
- Danny Romero – recording, additional recording (track 2)
- Regula Merz – recording assistance (track 2)
- Rich Palmer – recording assistance (track 2)
- Derek Carlfon – additional recording assistance (track 2)
- Chucky T – programming production (tracks 3, 15)
- Flip Osman – engineering (track 3); mixing assistance (tracks 3, 5, 6, 8, 12)
- Paul Oliveira – engineering assistance (track 3); recording assistance, mixing assistance (track 11)
- Zach Prewitt – engineering assistance (tracks 3, 12, 15, 16)
- Kyle W. – engineering assistance (track 3)
- Tony Maserati – mixing (tracks 3, 5, 6, 8, 12)
- Eddie F – production (track 4)
- Darren Lighty – production (track 4)
- "You Can Ask" Giz – recording, mixing (track 4)
- Erick Ferrell – mixing assistance (track 4)
- Kevin Perry – mixing assistance (track 4)
- Rufus Blaq – co-production (track 5)
- Jason Hariston – associate production (track 5)
- Ivan Matias – production (track 6)
- Andrea Martin – production (track 6)
- Swizz Beatz – co-production (track 6)
- Warryn "Baby Dubb" Campbell – production (track 7)
- Jan Fairchild – recording (track 7)
- Manny Marroquin – mixing (track 7)
- Farah Fima – mixing assistance (track 7)
- Sandra Campbell – project coordination (track 7)
- Gerald "Da Clean Up Man" Isaac – production, recording (tracks 8, 14, 18)
- Edwin Ramos – recording (tracks 8, 14, 18)
- Ivan "Orthodox" Barias – production (track 9)
- Carvin "Ransum" Haggins – production (track 9)
- Charles "Storm" Martinez – recording (track 9)
- Jeff Chestek – recording (track 9)
- Serban Ghenea – mixing (track 9)
- Ali Shaheed Muhammad – production (track 10)
- Claudio Cueni – recording (track 10)
- Ian Blanch – recording assistance (track 10)
- Bob Power – mixing (track 10)
- Aaron "Freedom" Lyles – production, recording (track 13)
- Michael Conrader – engineering (track 15)
- Jay Nicholas – engineering assistance (track 15)
- Halsey Quemere – engineering assistance (track 15)
- Jason Tumminello – mixing assistance (tracks 15, 16)
- Kerry "Krucial" Brothers – remix, additional production (track 17)
- Tony Black – recording, mixing (track 17)
- Peter Edge – executive production
- Breyon Prescott – executive production
- Herb Powers Jr. – mastering

=== Artwork ===
- Warwick Saint – photography
- Alli – art direction, design
- Eric Altenburger – digital imaging
- Kenny Gravillis – CD label logo and art
- Chris LeBeau – photo session production

== Charts ==
=== Weekly charts ===
Weekly chart performance for Mahogany Soul
Chart (2001–2002)	Peak position
Australian Hitseekers Albums (ARIA)	13
Australian Urban Albums (ARIA)	19
Belgian Albums (Ultratop Flanders)	15
Dutch Albums (Album Top 100)	15
Finnish Albums (Suomen virallinen lista)	5
Swedish Albums (Sverigetopplistan)	23
UK Albums (OCC)	89
UK R&B Albums (OCC)	15
US Billboard 200	22
US Top R&B/Hip-Hop Albums (Billboard)	4

=== Year-end charts ===
2001 year-end chart performance for Mahogany Soul
Chart (2001)	Position
Canadian R&B Albums (Nielsen SoundScan)	172

2002 year-end chart performance for Mahogany Soul
Chart (2002)	Position
Belgian Albums (Ultratop Flanders)	80
Canadian R&B Albums (Nielsen SoundScan)	153
Dutch Albums (Album Top 100)	90
US Billboard 200	130
US Top R&B/Hip-Hop Albums (Billboard)	22

== Certifications ==
Certifications for Mahogany Soul
Region	Certification	Certified units/sales
Netherlands (NVPI)	Gold	40,000^{^}
United Kingdom (BPI)	Gold	100,000^{^}
United States (RIAA)	Gold	758,000
^{^} Shipments figures based on certification alone.

== Release history ==
Release history and formats for Mahogany Soul
Region	Date	Label	Ref.
United States	October 16, 2001	J	
United Kingdom	November 12, 2001	Arista	
Germany	December 12, 2001	BMG	
Japan	December 12, 2001	BMG	
