= How I Do =

Studio album by Res
- Released: June 26, 2001
- Genre: Soul; pop; rock; post-punk; neo soul
- Length: 47:49
- Label: MCA
- Producer: A Kid Called Roots; Bose; Mr. Khaliyl; Doc McKinney; Santigold

Res chronology
How I Do (2001)	Black.Girls.Rock! (2009)

Singles from How I Do
- 1. "Golden Boys" Released: June 11, 2002; 2. "They-Say Vision" Released: July 15, 2002

How I Do is the debut studio album by American singer Res. It was co-written by Santi White (as the lyricist), produced by Martin "Doc" McKinney, and released by MCA Records on June 26, 2001. The album charted for nine weeks on the Billboard 200, with the singles "Golden Boys" and "They-Say Vision" also charting.

== Music and lyrics ==
The album combines elements of a number of musical styles, including hip-hop, pop, rock, and R&B. The title track is pop-oriented, while "Sittin' Back" was called "hip-hop-hued" by one critic. While The Philadelphia Inquirer's Dan DeLuca calls it a "rock-soul album", The New York Times writer Touré says its "collection of seductive post-punk" evokes "the Pretenders, with lyrics about self-empowerment that harked back to the roaring female singer-songwriters of the 70's". In "Ice King", Res details the story of a relationship with a drug dealer. "Golden Boys" comments that many popular and lauded people "aren't always what they seem".

== Marketing and sales ==
How I Do was promoted with the release of two singles, "Golden Boys" and "They-Say Vision". "Golden Boys" reached number 30 on the Billboard Dance Club Songs chart, spending nine weeks total on the tally. The album itself sold 172,000 units in the US by June 2002.

Upon its release, the album failed to enter the Billboard 200 albums chart; however, in April 2002, nearly a year after its release, the album finally reached the chart, debuting at number 200. On the chart dated May 4, 2002, the album recorded a 25 percent gain in sales in the United States, leading it to jump from number 170 to 119 on that week's Billboard 200. That week, it also rose from number 11 to number 1 on the Heatseekers Albums chart. Billboard reported that the album's gain that week was attributable in part to a sale at Best Buy stores, but that sales gains were being reported at other chains, as well. The album ultimately attained a peak of number 115 on the Billboard 200, and spent a total of nine weeks on.

== Critical reception ==
Professional ratings
Review scores
Source	Rating
AllMusic	3/5 stars
Robert Christgau	(1-star Honorable Mention)
USA Today	3/4 stars

How I Do was met with positive reviews. Billboard named it "Critic's Choice" and noted how Res "effortlessly blends elements of rock, hip-hop, and R&B into a smoothed-out, soul-satisfying set". In a review-feature on contemporary neo soul albums, the Chicago Tribune's Greg Kot said How I Do "simmers with trip-hop atmospherics and embraces rock guitars and reggae bass lines", as "cautionary tales about fame, the media and unpaid debts give Res' streetsmart grooves a deep-soul resonance that eludes many of her contemporaries." Mark Anthony Neal, writing for PopMatters, applauded Santi White's lyrics concerning image and identity in the entertainment industry, particularly from the perspective of a black woman. Rolling Stone magazine's Tracy E. Hopkins ranked it fourth on her year-end list of top albums from 2001, making note of its mix of "new wave, alt rock, and a splash of reggae and hip-hop".

Some reviewers were less enthusiastic. The Village Voice critic Robert Christgau relegated the release to the "honorable mentions" section of his "Consumer Guide" column. He singled out "Golden Boys" and "Ice King" as highlights while recommending the album merely as "something to suck on while you dream of Lauryn [Hill]". AllMusic's Richie Unterberger deemed it "a competent and accomplished, and not great, crossover of soul, pop, rock, and some hip-hop-type beats", with production largely pop-based and lyrics somewhat different from typical R&B relationship songs.

In 2016, the webzine Treble included How I Do in a list of "10 Essential Neo-Soul Albums".

== Track listing ==
Track listing and credits adapted from CD liner notes and Spotify. Except where noted, all lyrics are by Santi White.

No.	Title	Lyrics	Music	Length
1.	"Golden Boys"		Doc McKinney	4:38
2.	"They-Say Vision"		McKinney	3:35
3.	"700 Mile Situation"	Shareese Ballard; White; Kobie Eshun	McKinney	4:10
4.	"Ice King"	Ballard; McKinney; Eshun	McKinney; Acklins Dillon	4:46
5.	"Sittin' Back"		McKinney; Dillon	4:05
6.	"How I Do"		Patrick Lawrence	3:59
7.	"If There Ain't Nothing"		McKinney; Dillon	3:24
8.	"The Hustler"		Lawrence	3:48
9.	"I've Known The Garden"		Jeremy Lapinski	3:38
10.	"Let Love"		McKinney	3:53
11.	"Tsunami" (contains hidden track)		Lapinski	7:48
Total length:				47:49

=== Special edition ===
11. "Tsunami" – 4:28
12. "Toxic You"/"Say It Anyway" – 7:16
- Note: On the standard edition of the album the final track "Tsunami" has the hidden track "Say It Anyway" on the end, whereas the iTunes and special edition CD versions of the album come with "Tsunami" as an individual track and a bonus track called "Toxic You" accompanied with "Say It Anyway".

== Personnel ==
Credits adapted from CD liner notes.

Musicians

- Res – lead vocals
- A Kid Called Roots – keyboards (6, 8), programming (6, 8)
- Blaxam – backing vocals (1, 4)
- Bose – various instruments (9), bass guitar (11), guitars (11)
- Soul Fingaz – Rhodes piano (1), keyboards (3), additional keyboards (4, 7)
- Mr. Khaliyl – bass guitar (5), drums (4, 5), programming (4, 5, 7), piano (7)
- Kobe – bass guitar (1–3), backing vocals (4)
- Doc McKinney – bass guitar (1, 4, 7), guitars (1–5, 7), programming (1, 2, 4, 7, 10, 11), Rhodes piano (1), keyboards (3–5, 7), drums (4), various instruments (10)
- Paulette McWilliams – backing vocals (1)
- Steven Murray – drum programming (3)
- Chuck Treece – drums (1–3)

Technical

- A Kid Called Roots – production (6, 8)
- Bose – production (9, 11)
- Mr. Khaliyl – production (4, 5, 7)
- Doc McKinney – production (1–5, 7, 10, 11), additional production (9), recording (1, 3, 4, 7, 10)
- Santigold – co-production (3)
- Tom DeKorte – recording (1–5, 9, 11)
- Jan Fairchild – mixing (1, 5, 10, 11)
- Gene Grimaldi – mastering
- Charles McCrory – recording (3)
- Neal H Pogue – mixing (2–4, 7, 9)
- Tony Prendatt – recording (6, 8)
- Blair Robb – recording (4, 5)
- Eddie Schreyer – mastering
- Chris Taylor – mixing (6, 8)

Artwork

- Chuck Amos – hairstyling
- Lysa Cooper – styling
- Carolina Gonzales – makeup
- Soap Design Co. – design
- Tim Stedman – art direction, design
- Ellen von Unwerth – photography

== Charts ==
Chart (2002)	Peak position
US Billboard 200	115
US Heatseekers Albums (Billboard)	1
US Top R&B/Hip-Hop Albums (Billboard)	43
