= Calvin Richardson =

American R&B and soul singer-songwriter

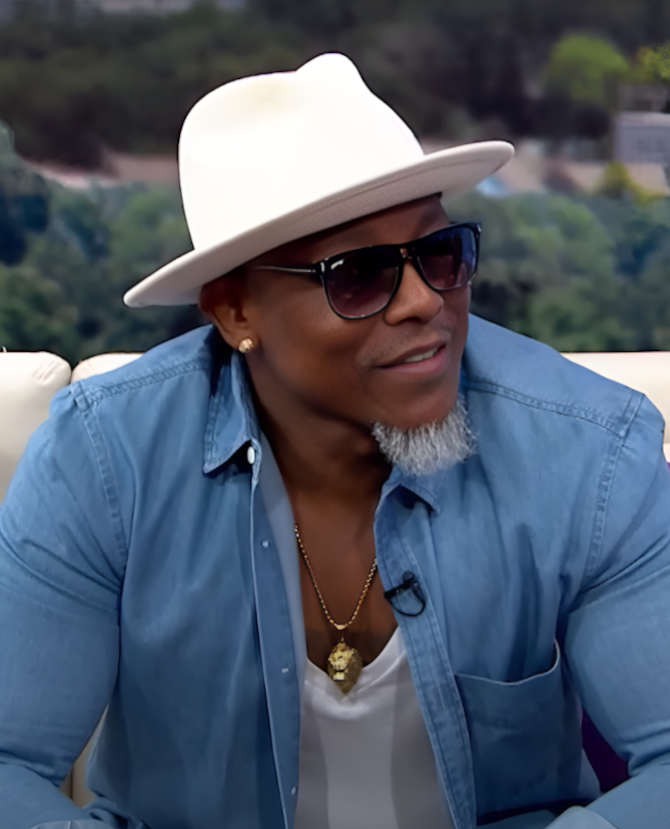
- Richardson in 2019.

Background information
- Born: Calvin Richardson; December 16, 1976 (age 49); Monroe, North Carolina, U.S.
- Origin: Charlotte, North Carolina, U.S.
- Genres: R&B, soul
- Occupations: Singer- songwriter; record producer
- Years active: 1995–present
- Labels: Tommy Boy; Universal; Hollywood; Shanachie; Jordan House; Primary Wave Music
- Website: Iamcalvinrichardson.com

Calvin Richardson (born December 16, 1976) is an American R&B singer-songwriter. He signed with Universal Records to release his debut studio album, Country Boy (1999). His second album, 2:35 PM (2003), was released by Hollywood Records and entered the Billboard 200.

== Career ==
Richardson got his start under producer Todd Ray as part of the trio Undacova. They contributed the song "Love Slave" to the soundtrack of the film New Jersey Drive. The group recorded an album for Tommy Boy Records which was later shelved. In the late 1990s, Richardson went solo and signed with Universal Records. His debut album, Country Boy, was released on August 24, 1999, selling 100,000 units. Despite this he was dropped by Universal. Shortly thereafter, he signed a contract with Hollywood Records.

On September 16, 2003, he released his second album, 2:35 PM. The album was given that name because Richardson's child was born at that time, just before completing the album. It featured the minor R&B hit "Keep On Pushin'", a song Richardson wrote and produced by himself. He originally recorded the song "More Than a Woman", a duet with Angie Stone that originally appeared on her 2001 album Mahogany Soul. Richardson would later re-record the song as a solo track for 2:35 pm. An alternate version of the song – with Richardson's vocals replaced by new ones from Joe – was nominated for Best R&B Performance by a Duo or Group with Vocal at the 2003 Grammy Awards. The album also included popular songs such as The Underdogs-produced single "Not Like This" as well as the Raphael Saadiq-produced "Falling Out". The album was produced by The Underdogs, Jake & Trevor, Young RJ, and Raphael Saadiq.

Richardson then co-wrote and performed on the track "Excuse Me", from Saadiq's 2002 Grammy Award nominated album Instant Vintage, as well as co-writing the Charlie Wilson single produced by Babyface "There Goes My Baby".

Richardson released his third album, When Love Comes, on May 27, 2008, on Shanachie Records. In 2009, he was chosen to record a tribute album to Bobby Womack, which coincided with Womack being inducted into the Rock and Roll Hall of Fame. The Grammy-nominated album was entitled Facts Of Life: The Soul Of Bobby Womack. On August 31, 2010, Richardson released his fifth album, America's Most Wanted. The lead single was "You're So Amazing".

As of 2013, he has joined the upcoming reality series "Come Back Kings" with Ed Lover, Horace Brown, David "Davinch" Chance (of Ruff Endz), Jeff Sanders, Jameio, Mr. Cheeks and Black Rob.

In January 2014, it was announced that Richardson signed a new deal with Eric Benét's label Jordan House Records with distribution and marketing from the company Primary Wave Music.

In April 2014, Richardson released the first single from his I Am Calvin album, entitled "We Gon' Love Tonite"."

On September 30, 2014, Richardson released his fifth studio album I Am Calvin on Jordan House/Primary Wave Music/BMG Rights Management.

In January 2015, following the lead single "We Gon' Love Tonite", Richardson released the second single from his album, "Hearsay".

== Artistry ==
=== Influences ===
Richardson cites Babyface as a major influence and someone who has he "learned a lot from". He also cites R. Kelly as someone who he would want to work with, admiring his creativity. Other artists that Richardson says has influenced him are Al Green, Marvin Gaye, Sam Cooke, Bobby Womack, K-Ci Hailey, and Stevie Wonder.

== Discography ==
=== Studio albums ===
Title	Album details	Peak positions		
Title	Album details	US	US R&B	US Indie
Country Boy	Released: August 24, 1999; Label: Universal Motown; Formats: CD, cassette	—	27	—
2:35 PM	Released: September 16, 2003; Label: Hollywood; Formats: CD, digital download	65	8	—
When Love Comes	Released: May 27, 2008; Label: Shanachie; Formats: CD, digital download	—	17	25
Facts of Life: The Soul of Bobby Womack	Released: August 25, 2009; Label: Shanachie; Formats: CD, digital download	—	30	50
America's Most Wanted	Released: August 31, 2010; Label: Shanachie; Formats: CD, digital download	—	38	49
I Am Calvin	Released: September 30, 2014; Label: Jordan House, Primary Wave Music; Formats: CD, digital download	—	34	—
All or Nothing	Released: September 29, 2017; Label: Music Matters; Formats: CD, digital download	—	—	—
Gold Dust	Released: October 25, 2019; Label: Shanachie; Formats: CD, digital download	—	—	—
Five Years Later...	Released: September 20, 2024; Label: Shanachie; Formats: CD, digital download	—	—	—

== Awards ==
Grammy Awards

Year	Nominee / work	Award	Result
2010	"Love Has Finally Come At Last"	Best R&B Performance by a Duo or Group with Vocals	Nominated
2010	Woman Gotta Have It	Best Traditional R&B Performance	Nominated
2011	"You're So Amazing"	Best Traditional R&B Performance	Nominated
