= List of songs recorded by Amy Winehouse =

Songs by English singer

English singer and songwriter Amy Winehouse recorded songs for three released albums, including one released posthumously. Some tracks have since remained unpublished and their existence is only known through word-of-mouth or bootleg publication. Disregarding live recordings, Winehouse is known to have over 40 released tracks alongside over a dozen unreleased.

== List of songs ==
Key
| † | Indicates song written solely by Amy Winehouse |

List of songs recorded by Amy Winehouse
| Song | Other performer(s) | Writer(s) | Original release | Year | Ref. |
|---|---|---|---|---|---|
| "A Song for You" | None | Leon Russell | Lioness: Hidden Treasures | 2011 | |
| "Addicted" | None | Amy Winehouse † | Back to Black | 2006 | |
| "Amy Amy Amy"/"Outro"/"Brother"/"Mr. Magic (Through the Smoke)" | None | Amy Winehouse; Matt Rowe; Stefan Skarbek; Salaam Remi; Earl "Chinna" Smith; Teodross Avery; Donovan Jackson; Astor Campbel; Gordon Williams; Ralph MacDonald; William Salter | Frank | 2003 | |
| "Back to Black" | None | Amy Winehouse; Mark Ronson | Back to Black | 2006 | |
| "Best Friends, Right?" | None | Amy Winehouse † | Lioness: Hidden Treasures | 2011 | |
| "Between the Cheats" | None | Amy Winehouse; Salaam Remi | Lioness: Hidden Treasures | 2011 | |
| "Body and Soul" | Tony Bennett | Edward Heyman; Robert Sour; Frank Eyton; John Green | Lioness: Hidden Treasures | 2011 | |
| "Close to the Front" | None | Amy Winehouse † | Back to Black | 2006 | |
| "Cupid" | None | Sam Cooke | Back to Black | 2006 | |
| "Fuck Me Pumps" | None | Amy Winehouse; Salaam Remi | Frank | 2003 | |
| "Half Time" | None | Amy Winehouse; Fin Greenall | Lioness: Hidden Treasures | 2011 | |
| "He Can Only Hold Her" | None | Amy Winehouse; Richard Poindexter; Robert Poindexter | Back to Black | 2006 | |
| "Help Yourself" | None | Amy Winehouse; Jimmy Hogarth | Frank | 2003 | |
| "Hey Little Rich Girl" | Zalon and Ade | Roddy Byers | Back to Black | 2006 | |
| "I Heard Love Is Blind" | None | Amy Winehouse † | Frank | 2003 | |
| "In My Bed" | None | Amy Winehouse; Salaam Remi | Frank | 2003 | |
| "Just Friends" | None | Amy Winehouse † | Back to Black | 2006 | |
| "Know You Now" | None | Amy Winehouse; Gordon Williams; Earl "Chinna" Smith; Delroy "Chris" Cooper; Astor Campbell; Donovan Jackson | Frank | 2003 | |
| "Love Is a Losing Game" | None | Amy Winehouse † | Back to Black | 2006 | |
| "Like Smoke" | Nas | Amy Winehouse; Salaam Remi; Nasir Jones | Lioness: Hidden Treasures | 2011 | |
| "Me & Mr Jones" | None | Amy Winehouse † | Back to Black | 2006 | |
| "Monkey Man" | None | Frederick Hibbert | Back to Black | 2006 | |
| "Moody's Mood for Love"/"Teo Licks" | None | Jimmy McHugh; Dorothy Fields; James Moody | Frank | 2003 | |
| "October Song" | None | Amy Winehouse; Matt Rowe; Stefan Skarbek | Frank | 2003 | |
| "Our Day Will Come" | None | Mort Garson; Bob Hilliard | Lioness: Hidden Treasures | 2011 | |
| "Rehab" | None | Amy Winehouse † | Back to Black | 2006 | |
| "Some Unholy War" | None | Amy Winehouse † | Back to Black | 2006 | |
| "Stronger Than Me [Jazz Intro]" | None | Amy Winehouse; Salaam Remi | Frank | 2003 | |
| "Take the Box" | None | Amy Winehouse; Luke Smith | Frank | 2003 | |
| "Tears Dry on Their Own" | None | Amy Winehouse; Nickolas Ashford; Valerie Simpson | Back to Black | 2006 | |
| "The Girl from Ipanema" | None | Norman Gimbel; Antônio Carlos Jobim; Vinicius de Moraes | Lioness: Hidden Treasures | 2011 | |
| "(There Is) No Greater Love" | None | Isham Jones; Marty Symes | Frank | 2003 | |
| "To Know Him Is to Love Him" | None | Phil Spector | Back to Black | 2006 | |
| "Valerie" | None | Dave McCabe; The Zutons | Version (album by Mark Ronson) | 2006 | |
| "Wake Up Alone" | None | Amy Winehouse; Paul O'Duffy | Back to Black | 2006 | |
| "What Is It About Men" | None | Amy Winehouse; Felix Howard; Paul Watson; Luke Smith; Gordon Williams; Earl "Chinna" Smith; Wilburn "Squiddley" Cole; Delroy "Chris" Cooper; Donovan Jackson | Frank | 2003 | |
| "Will You Still Love Me Tomorrow?" | None | Gerry Goffin; Carole King | Lioness: Hidden Treasures | 2011 | |
| "You Know I'm No Good" | None | Amy Winehouse † | Back to Black | 2006 | |
| "You Sent Me Flying"/"Cherry" | None | Amy Winehouse; Felix Howard; Salaam Remi | Frank | 2003 | |
| "You're Wondering Now" | None | Clement Dodd | Back to Black | 2006 | |
