= Frank (Amy Winehouse album) =

Studio album by Amy Winehouse
- Released: 20 October 2003
- Recorded: 2002–2003
- Studios: Creative Space (Miami); EMI (London); The Headquarters (New Jersey); Mayfair (London); Platinum Sound Recording (New York City)
- Genres: Jazz; R&B; soul; hip-hop; bossa nova
- Length: 58:48
- Label: Island
- Producers: Commissioner Gordon; Jimmy Hogarth; Salaam Remi; Matt Rowe; Amy Winehouse

Amy Winehouse chronology
Frank (2003)	Back to Black (2006)

Singles from Frank
- 1. "Stronger Than Me" Released: 6 October 2003; 2. "Take the Box" Released: 12 January 2004; 3. "In My Bed" / "You Sent Me Flying" Released: 5 April 2004; 4. "Pumps" / "Help Yourself" Released: 23 August 2004

Frank is the debut studio album by the English singer and songwriter Amy Winehouse. It was released on 20 October 2003, by Island Records. Production for the album took place during 2002 to 2003 and was handled by Winehouse, Salaam Remi, Commissioner Gordon, Jimmy Hogarth and Matt Rowe. Its title alludes to the nature and tone of Winehouse's lyrics on the album, as well as one of her influences, Frank Sinatra.

Upon its release, Frank received generally positive reviews from most music critics and earned Winehouse several accolades, including an Ivor Novello Award. The album has sold over one million copies in the United Kingdom and has been certified quadruple platinum by the British Phonographic Industry (BPI).

== Background ==
After playing around with her brother's guitar, Winehouse bought her own when she was 15 and began writing music a year later. Soon after, she began working for a living, including, at one time, as an entertainment journalist for the World Entertainment News Network, in addition to singing with local group the Bolsha Band. In July 2000, she became the featured female vocalist with the National Youth Jazz Orchestra; her influences were to include Sarah Vaughan and Dinah Washington, the latter whom she was already listening to at home.

Winehouse's best friend, soul singer Tyler James, sent her demo tape to an artists and repertoire (A&R) executive. Winehouse signed to Simon Fuller's 19 Management in 2002 and was paid £250 a week against future earnings. While being developed by the management company, she was kept as a recording industry secret, although she was a regular jazz standards singer at the Cobden Club. Her soon-to-be A&R representative at Island Records, Darcus Beese, heard of her by accident when the manager of The Lewinson Brothers showed him some productions of his clients, which featured Winehouse as key vocalist. When he asked who the singer was, the manager told him he was not allowed to say. Having decided that he wanted to sign her, it took several months of asking around for Beese to eventually discover who the singer was. However, Winehouse had already recorded a number of songs and signed a publishing deal with EMI by this time. She formed a working relationship with producer Salaam Remi through these record publishers.

Beese introduced Winehouse to his boss, Nick Gatfield, and the Island head shared his enthusiasm in signing her. Winehouse was signed to Island, as rival interest in Winehouse had started to build to include representatives of EMI and Virgin starting to make moves. Beese told HitQuarters that he felt the reason behind the excitement, over an artist who was an atypical pop star for the time, was due to a backlash against reality TV music shows, which included audiences starved for fresh, genuine young talent.

In a 2004 interview with The Observer, Winehouse expressed dissatisfaction with the album, stating:

Some things on this album make me go to a little place that's fucking bitter. I've never heard the album from start to finish. I don't have it in my house. Well, the marketing was fucked, the promotion was terrible. Everything was a shambles. It's frustrating, because you work with so many idiots—but they're nice idiots. So you can't be like, "You're an idiot." They know that they're idiots.

== Release and promotion ==
In the liner notes for Winehouse's 2011 album Lioness: Hidden Treasures, producer Salaam Remi wrote about the track "Half Time", an outtake from the recording sessions for Frank, and revealed that Frank's title refers partly to Frank Sinatra, an early influence on Winehouse.

Frank was first released in the United Kingdom on 20 October 2003 through Island Records. In 2004, the album was released to European countries, including Poland and Germany, as well as being released in Canada through Universal Music Group. In 2007 the album was released once again to Australia in March and the United States in November, with the latter being released via Universal Republic Records.

In 2008, the album was re-released as a deluxe edition, including an 18-track bonus disc of rare tracks, remixes, B-sides and live performances. It was first released in Germany on 9 May 2008, followed by its release in the United Kingdom on 12 May 2008 through Island Records. Over May, June and July the album was released in Australia, Canada, United States and Japan.

Following the release of the critically acclaimed documentary film about Winehouse, Amy (2015), Frank was reissued on vinyl on 31 July 2015 by Republic Records.

== Critical reception ==
Professional ratings
Aggregate scores
Source	Rating
Metacritic	78/100
Review scores
Source	Rating
AllMusic	4/5 stars
The A.V. Club	B+
Entertainment Weekly	A−
The Guardian	4/5 stars
MusicOMH	4/5 stars
Now	3/5 stars
Pitchfork	4.9/10
PopMatters	7/10
Rolling Stone	2.5/5 stars
USA Today	3.5/4 stars

Frank received mostly positive reviews from contemporary music critics. At Metacritic, which assigns a normalised rating out of 100 to reviews from mainstream publications, the album received an average score of 78, based on 11 reviews. AllMusic's John Bush called Winehouse "an excellent vocalist possessing both power and subtlety". Nate Chinen of The New York Times complimented her original lyrics and called the music a "glossy admixture of breezy funk, dub and jazz-inflected soul". The A.V. Club's Nathan Rabin commended its loose, organic songcraft and wrote that it "features languid, wide-open neo-soul grooves and jazzy vamping". Beccy Lindon of The Guardian described Winehouse's sound as "somewhere between Nina Simone and Erykah Badu ... at once innocent and sleazy". Entertainment Weekly's Chris Willman found its musical style reminiscent of Sade. MusicOMH's John Murphy said that her lyrics are "commendably feisty and, as the album title suggests, frank". Dan Cairns of The Times called Frank "a staggeringly assured, sit-up-and-listen debut, both commercial and eclectic, accessible and uncompromising". Robert Christgau, writing for MSN Music, was less enthusiastic and graded the album a "dud".

Winehouse was nominated for British Female Solo Artist and British Urban Act at the 2004 BRIT Awards, while Frank was shortlisted for the Mercury Music Prize that same year. The album earned Winehouse an Ivor Novello Award. In retrospective reviews for both Pitchfork and Rolling Stone, critic Douglas Wolk was ambivalent towards Winehouse's themes and felt that they are relevant to her public image at the time, writing in the former review, "in the light of her subsequent career, Frank comes off as the first chapter in the Romantic myth of the poet who feels too deeply and ends up killing herself for her audience's entertainment". By contrast, PopMatters writer Mike Joseph felt that the album shows that Winehouse's success is "based on pure talent rather than good producers or gimmicks". The Washington Post's Bill Friskics-Warren noted most of its content as "sultry ballads and shambling neo-soul jams", while writing that it "more than confirms what the fuss over Winehouse – then just 19 and with a lot fewer tattoos – was originally all about... her attitude and command were already there. And then some". The album was also included in the book 1001 Albums You Must Hear Before You Die. In 2019, the album was ranked 57th on The Guardian's 100 Best Albums of the 21st Century list.

== Commercial performance ==
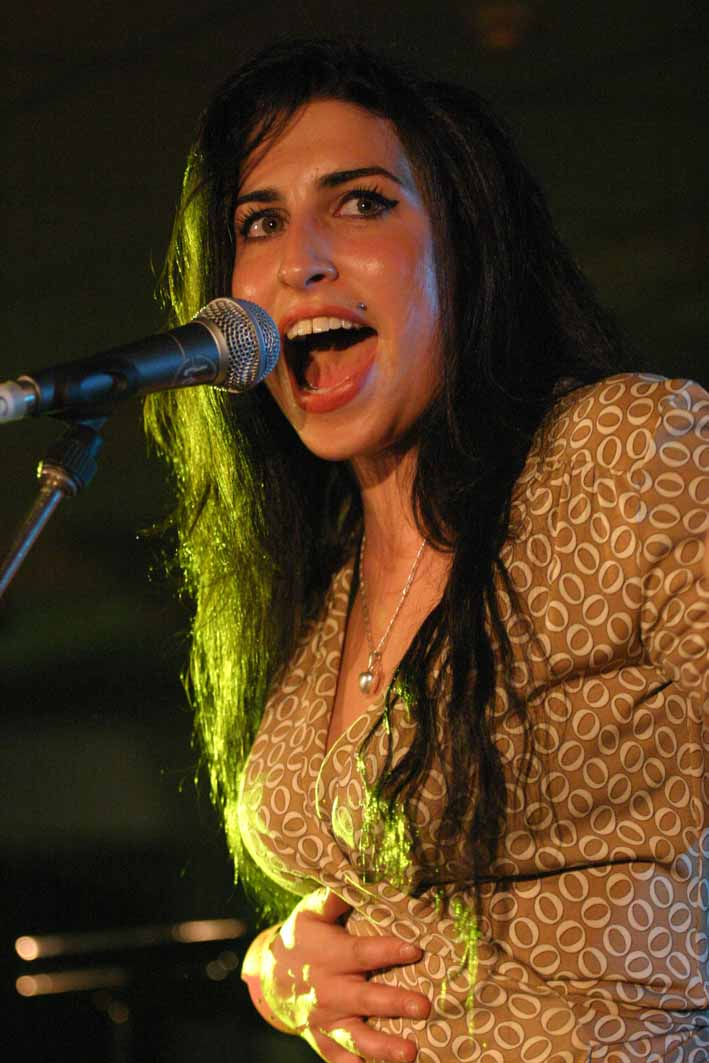
Winehouse performing in July 2004

Frank entered the UK Albums Chart at number 60 before climbing to number 13 in late January 2004. Following Winehouse's death on 23 July 2011, the album re-entered the UK chart at number five, before reaching a new peak position of number three the following week, with 19,811 copies sold. The album was certified quadruple platinum by the British Phonographic Industry (BPI) on 22 May 2026, and had sold over one million copies as of September 2014.

Frank debuted at number 61 on the Billboard 200 in the United States, selling 22,000 copies in its opening week. In the wake of Winehouse's death, the album sold 8,000 copies to re-enter the chart at number 57 on the issue dated 6 August 2011. The following week, it rose to a new peak of number 33 with sales of 12,000 copies. The album had sold 315,000 copies in the US by July 2011.

Elsewhere, the album charted inside the top five in Austria and Poland, and the top 10 in France, Germany, Ireland, Italy, Netherlands and Portugal. In late 2011, Frank was certified double platinum by the International Federation of the Phonographic Industry (IFPI) for sales in excess of two million copies across Europe.

== Track listing ==
UK edition
No.	Title	Writer(s)	Producer(s)	Length
1.	"Intro"/"Stronger Than Me"	Amy Winehouse/Winehouse; Salaam Remi	Commissioner Gordon/Salaam "The Chameleon" Remi	3:54
2.	"You Sent Me Flying"/"Cherry"	Winehouse; Felix Howard/Winehouse; Remi	Remi	6:50
3.	"Know You Now"	Winehouse; Gordon Williams; Earl "Chinna" Smith; Delroy "Chris" Cooper; Astor Campbell; Donovan Jackson	Commissioner Gordon	3:03
4.	"Fuck Me Pumps"	Winehouse; Remi	Remi	3:20
5.	"I Heard Love Is Blind"	Winehouse	Remi	2:10
6.	"Moody's Mood for Love"/"Teo Licks"	Jimmy McHugh; Dorothy Fields; James Moody/Winehouse	Remi/Commissioner Gordon	3:28
7.	"(There Is) No Greater Love"	Isham Jones; Marty Symes	Commissioner Gordon	2:08
8.	"In My Bed"	Winehouse; Remi	Remi	5:17
9.	"Take the Box"	Winehouse; Luke Smith	Winehouse; Jony Rockstar^{[a]}	3:20
10.	"October Song"	Winehouse; Matt Rowe; Stefan Skarbek	Commissioner Gordon	3:24
11.	"What Is It About Men"	Winehouse; Howard; Paul Watson; L. Smith; Williams; E. Smith; Wilburn "Squiddley" Cole; Cooper; D. Jackson	Commissioner Gordon	3:29
12.	"Help Yourself"	Winehouse; Jimmy Hogarth	Hogarth	5:01
13.	"Amy Amy Amy"/"Outro"/"Brother" (hidden track)/"Mr Magic (Through the Smoke)" (hidden track)	Winehouse; Rowe; Skarbek/Winehouse; Remi/Winehouse; E. Smith; Teodross Avery; D. Jackson; Campbell; Williams/Winehouse; Ralph MacDonald; William Salter	Rowe/Remi	13:14

Japanese edition bonus tracks
No.	Title	Writer(s)	Producer(s)	Length
14.	"Fuck Me Pumps" (Mylo Remix)	Winehouse; Remi	Remi	4:50
15.	"In My Bed" (Bugz in the Attic Vocal Mix)	Winehouse; Remi	Remi	6:00
16.	"Take the Box" (Seiji's Buggin' Mix Mix)	Winehouse; L. Smith	Winehouse; Rockstar^{[a]}	7:50

US edition
No.	Title	Writer(s)	Producer(s)	Length
1.	"Intro"/"Stronger Than Me"	Winehouse/Winehouse; Remi	Commissioner Gordon/Remi	3:54
2.	"You Sent Me Flying"/"Cherry"	Winehouse; Howard/Winehouse; Remi	Remi	6:50
3.	"Know You Now"	Winehouse; Williams; E. Smith; Cooper; D. Jackson	Commissioner Gordon	3:03
4.	"Fuck Me Pumps"	Winehouse; Remi	Remi	3:20
5.	"I Heard Love Is Blind"	Winehouse	Remi	2:10
6.	"Moody's Mood for Love"/"Teo Licks"	McHugh; Fields; Moody/Winehouse	Remi/Commissioner Gordon	3:28
7.	"(There Is) No Greater Love"	Jones; Symes	Commissioner Gordon	2:08
8.	"In My Bed"	Winehouse; Remi	Remi	5:17
9.	"Take the Box"	Winehouse; L. Smith	Winehouse; Rockstar^{[a]}	3:20
10.	"October Song"	Winehouse; Rowe; Skarbek	Commissioner Gordon	3:24
11.	"What Is It About Men"	Winehouse; Howard; Watson; L. Smith; Williams; E. Smith; Cole; Cooper; D. Jackson	Commissioner Gordon	3:29
12.	"Amy Amy Amy"/"Outro"/"Brother" (hidden track)/"Mr Magic (Through the Smoke)" (hidden track)	Winehouse; Rowe; Skarbek/Winehouse; Remi/Winehouse; E. Smith; Avery; D. Jackson; Campbell; Williams/Winehouse; MacDonald; Salter	Rowe/Remi	13:14

Australian, Brazilian, Dutch, French, German and Italian editions
No.	Title	Writer(s)	Producer(s)	Length
1.	"Intro"/"Stronger Than Me"	Winehouse/Winehouse; Remi	Commissioner Gordon/Remi	3:54
2.	"You Sent Me Flying"/"Cherry"	Winehouse; Howard/Winehouse; Remi	Remi	6:50
3.	"Fuck Me Pumps"	Winehouse; Remi	Remi	3:20
4.	"I Heard Love Is Blind"	Winehouse	Remi	2:10
5.	"(There Is) No Greater Love"/"Teo Licks"	Jones; Symes	Remi/Commissioner Gordon	2:08
6.	"In My Bed"	Winehouse; Remi	Remi	5:17
7.	"Take the Box"	Winehouse; L. Smith	Winehouse; Rockstar^{[a]}	3:20
8.	"October Song"	Winehouse; Rowe; Skarbek	Commissioner Gordon	3:24
9.	"What Is It About Men"	Winehouse; Howard; Watson; L. Smith; Williams; E. Smith; Cole; Cooper; D. Jackson	Commissioner Gordon	3:29
10.	"Help Yourself"	Winehouse; Hogarth	Hogarth	5:01
11.	"Amy Amy Amy"/"Outro"/"Moody's Mood for Love" (hidden track)/"Know You Now" (hidden track)	Winehouse; Rowe; Skarbek/Winehouse; Remi/McHugh; Fields; Moody/Winehouse; Williams; E. Smith; Cooper; D. Jackson	Rowe/Remi/Remi/Commissioner Gordon	11:03

Deluxe edition bonus disc
No.	Title	Writer(s)	Producer(s)	Length
1.	"Take the Box" (original demo)	Winehouse; L. Smith	Winehouse	3:26
2.	"You Sent Me Flying" (original demo) (UK edition only)	Winehouse; Howard	Winehouse	5:40
3.	"I Heard Love Is Blind" (original demo)	Winehouse		2:13
4.	"Someone to Watch Over Me" (original demo)	George Gershwin; Ira Gershwin	Howard; Paul Simm	4:29
5.	"What It Is" (original demo)	Winehouse	Winehouse	4:45
6.	"Teach Me Tonight" (Hootenanny)	Sammy Cahn; Gene de Paul	Alison Howe	3:22
7.	"'Round Midnight" (B-side)	Bernard D. Hanighen; Thelonious S. Monk; Charles "Cootie" Williams	Remi	3:49
8.	"Fool's Gold" (B-side)	Winehouse	Remi	3:40
9.	"Stronger Than Me" (Later... with Jools Holland)	Winehouse; Remi	Howe	3:53
10.	"I Heard Love Is Blind" (live at the Concorde, Brighton)	Winehouse	Andy Rogers; Sam Cunningham	2:29
11.	"Take the Box" (live at the Concorde, Brighton)	Winehouse; L. Smith	Rogers; Cunningham	3:33
12.	"In My Bed" (live at the Concorde, Brighton)	Winehouse; Remi	Rogers; Cunningham	5:37
13.	"Mr Magic (Through the Smoke)" (Janice Long Session)	Winehouse; MacDonald; Salter	Chris Mears	4:05
14.	"(There Is) No Greater Love" (Janice Long Session)	Jones; Symes	Mears	2:38
15.	"Fuck Me Pumps" (MJ Cole Mix)	Winehouse; Remi	Remi	5:54
16.	"Take the Box" (Seiji's Buggin' Mix)	Winehouse; L. Smith	Winehouse; Rockstar^{[a]}	7:48
17.	"Stronger Than Me" (Harmonic 33 Mix)	Winehouse; Remi	Remi	3:43
18.	"In My Bed" (CJ Mix)	Winehouse; Remi	Remi	4:36

=== Notes ===
- ^{^[a]} signifies an additional producer
- "You Sent Me Flying" is based on an original demo recorded by Felix Howard, Paul Watson and Luke Smith.
- "Help Yourself" contains elements from "You Won't Be Satisfied (Until You Break My Heart)" written by Freddy James and Larry Stock.
- On some digital editions, the "Amy Amy Amy / Outro" medley is presented as four separate tracks.

== Personnel ==
Credits adapted from the liner notes of Frank.

- Amy Winehouse – vocals, guitar, production
- 21st Century Jazz – accompaniment
- John Adams – organ, Rhodes
- Robert Aaron – flute, saxophone
- Teodross Avery – saxophone
- Ian Barter – guitar
- Rudy Bird – percussion, shaker
- Houston "House" Bowen – engineering assistance
- Ben Bryant – engineering assistance
- Errol Campbell – drums, percussion
- Wilburn "Squiddley" Cole – drums
- Commissioner Gordon – drums, effects, engineering, mixing, percussion, production, programming, turntables
- Delroy "Chris" Cooper – bass
- Tom Coyne – mastering
- Cameron Craig – mixing
- Tanya Darby – trumpet
- Tom Elmhirst – mixing
- Jeni Fujita – backing vocals
- Vincent Henry – alto flute, alto saxophone, baritone saxophone, flute, tenor saxophone
- Jimmy Hogarth – bass, drums, guitar, mixing, percussion, production, programming
- Felix Howard – backing vocals
- Stafford Hunter – trombone
- Timothy Hutton – horn
- Donovan Jackson – keyboards, organ, Rhodes
- Gregory Jackson – bass
- Kate Lower – coordinator
- Michael Nash Associates – cover design
- Charles Moriarty – cover photography
- Gary "Mon" Noble – engineering, mixing
- Steve "Esp" Nowa – engineering assistance
- Valerie Phillips – photography
- John Piretti – engineering assistance
- Bruce Purse – baritone horn, bass trumpet, flugelhorn, trumpet
- Salaam Remi – arrangement, drum programming, drums, electric bass, electric upright bass, mixing, organ, percussion, production
- Jony Rockstar – additional production
- Matt Rowe – backing vocals, production, trumpet
- Jeremy Shaw – guitar
- Stefan Skarbek – backing vocals, trumpet
- Martin Slattery – Hammond organ, horn, Wurlitzer
- Earl "Chinna" Smith – guitar
- Luke Smith – bass, keyboards, piano
- Lenny Underwood – keyboards, piano
- Richard Wilkinson – additional drums
- Brent Williams – mixing assistance
- Troy Wilson – drums

== Charts ==
=== Weekly charts ===
Chart (2003–2021)	Peak position
Australian Albums (ARIA)	23
Austrian Albums (Ö3 Austria)	5
Belgian Albums (Ultratop Flanders)	35
Canadian Albums (Nielsen SoundScan)	23
Croatian Albums (HDU)	19
Czech Albums (ČNS IFPI)	12
Danish Albums (Hitlisten)	16
Dutch Albums (Album Top 100)	7
European Albums (Billboard)	13
French Albums (SNEP)	9
German Albums (Offizielle Top 100)	9
Greek Albums (IFPI)	2
Hungarian Albums (MAHASZ)	30
Irish Albums (IRMA)	9
Italian Albums (FIMI)	7
Mexican Albums (Top 100 Mexico)	20
New Zealand Albums (RMNZ)	22
Polish Albums (ZPAV)	5
Portuguese Albums (AFP)	10
Scottish Albums (Official Charts)	4
Slovenian Albums (IFPI)	4
Spanish Albums (Promusicae)	6
Swiss Albums (Schweizer Hitparade)	16
UK Albums (Official Charts)	3
UK Jazz & Blues Albums (Official Charts)	1
US Billboard 200	33
US Top R&B/Hip-Hop Albums (Billboard)	26
US Indie Store Album Sales (Billboard)	25

Chart (2024)	Peak position
UK Albums Downloads	34

=== Year-end charts ===
Chart (2004)	Position
UK Albums (OCC)	102

Chart (2007)	Position
UK Albums (OCC)	37

Chart (2008)	Position
Austrian Albums (Ö3 Austria)	27
French Albums (SNEP)	48
German Albums (Offizielle Top 100)	37
Italian Albums (FIMI)	72
Spanish Albums (PROMUSICAE)	35
UK Albums (OCC)	60

Chart (2011)	Position
Austrian Albums (Ö3 Austria)	72
Italian Albums (FIMI)	87
Polish Albums (ZPAV)	95
UK Albums (OCC)	101

== Certifications ==
Region	Certification	Certified units/sales
Australia (ARIA)	Gold	35,000^{^}
Austria (IFPI Austria)	Gold	15,000^{*}
Belgium (BRMA)	Gold	25,000^{*}
Brazil (Pro-Música Brasil)	Gold	50,000^{*}
Denmark (IFPI Danmark)	Gold	20,000^{^}
Germany (BVMI)	Platinum	200,000^{^}
Italy (FIMI) sales since 2009	Platinum	50,000^{*}
Poland (ZPAV)	Gold	20,000^{*}
Portugal (AFP)	Gold	20,000^{^}
Russia (NFPF)	Gold	10,000^{*}
Spain (Promusicae)	Gold	50,000^{^}
Switzerland (IFPI Switzerland)	Platinum	40,000^{^}
United Kingdom (BPI)	4× Platinum	1,200,000^{‡}
Summaries
Europe (IFPI)	2× Platinum	2,000,000^{*}
^{*} Sales figures based on certification alone.^{^} Shipments figures based on certification alone.

== Release history ==
Region	Date	Edition	Label	Ref.
United Kingdom	20 October 2003	Standard	Island	
Poland	15 March 2004	Standard	Universal	
Canada	8 June 2004	Standard	Universal	
Germany	20 September 2004	Standard	Universal	
Australia	9 March 2007	Standard	Universal	
United States	20 November 2007	Standard	Universal Republic	
Japan	5 December 2007	Standard	Universal	
Germany	9 May 2008	Deluxe	Universal	
United Kingdom	12 May 2008	Deluxe	Island	
Australia	17 May 2008	Deluxe	Universal	
Canada	27 May 2008	Deluxe	Universal	
United States	3 June 2008	Deluxe	Universal Republic	
Japan	2 July 2008	Deluxe	Universal	
