= Take the Box =

Single by Amy Winehouse

from the album Frank
- B-side: "Round Midnight"
- Released: 12 January 2004
- Recorded: 2003
- Studio: EMI (London)
- Genre: Soul; jazz
- Length: 3:20
- Label: Island
- Songwriters: Amy Winehouse; Luke Smith
- Producers: Amy Winehouse; Jony Rockstar

Amy Winehouse singles chronology
| "Stronger Than Me" (2003) | "Take the Box" (2004) | "In My Bed" / "You Sent Me Flying" (2004) |

Music video
- "Take the Box" on YouTube

"Take the Box" is a song by the English singer-songwriter Amy Winehouse from her debut studio album Frank (2003). Released as the album's second single on 12 January 2004, it was the highest-charting single from Frank, peaking at number 57 on the UK Singles Chart.

The B-side of the single featured a cover of the jazz standard "'Round Midnight", written by Thelonious Monk.

The character in the song is in the process of discarding her former lover and leaving him, after discovering he is having an affair. The song details her acceptance of the fact that its over as she tells the lover to literally "take the box", including gifts of love he had previously given her. Within the narrative of the songs of her debut album...placed so as to indicate a storyline, "Take the Box" indicates the break-up of the relationship.

== Personnel ==
- Jeremy Shaw — guitar
- Richard Wilkinson — drums
- Timothy Hutton — horns
- Luke Smith — bass, piano, organ

== Music video ==
A music video was produced to promote the single. It shows Winehouse working at an empty disco hall as the last guests leave she walks into the hall that is lit by many little disco balls. The scenes intercut with her in a red dress singing with her guitar and her by the empty tables and chairs looking wistfully around at the empty stage.

== Track listings ==
UK CD
(CID 840; Released: 12 January 2004)

1. "Take the Box"
2. "Round Midnight"
3. "Stronger Than Me" (Live)

UK CD promo
(CIDDJ 840; Released: 2004)

1. "Take the Box" – 3:19

UK 12" vinyl
(12 IS 840; Released: 2004)

Side A

1. "Take the Box" (Seiji's Buggin' Mix)

Side B

1. "Take the Box" (The Headquarters Mix)

UK 12" vinyl promo
(12 ISX 840 DJ; Released: 2004)

Side A

1. "Take the Box" (Seiji's Buggin' mix)

Side B

1. "Take the Box" (Seiji's Buggin' rub)
2. "Take the Box" (The Headquarters mix)

== Charts ==
| Chart (2004) | Peak position |
|---|---|
| Scottish Singles Sales (Official Charts) | 94 |
| UK Singles (Official Charts) | 57 |
| UK Hip Hop/R&B (Official Charts) | 14 |
