= Help Yourself (Amy Winehouse song) =

Single by Amy Winehouse

from the album Frank
- A-side: "Pumps"
- Released: 23 August 2004
- Recorded: 2003
- Studio: Creative Space (Miami)
- Genre: Rhythm and blues; jazz
- Length: 5:01
- Label: Island
- Songwriters: Amy Winehouse; Jimmy Hogarth
- Producer: Jimmy Hogarth

Amy Winehouse singles chronology
"In My Bed" / "You Sent Me Flying" (2004)	"Pumps" / "Help Yourself" (2004)	"Rehab" (2006)

"Help Yourself" is a song by the English singer-songwriter Amy Winehouse from her debut studio album Frank (2003). Released as the album's fourth and final single on 23 August 2004 as a double A-side with "Fuck Me Pumps" (Pumps), it reached number 65 on the UK Singles Chart. The song was not included on the U.S. release of Frank. A radio edit was released for promotional purposes. The song samples "You Won't Be Satisfied (Until You Break My Heart)" as recorded by Doris Day in 1945.

== Personnel ==
Credits adapted from "Pumps / Help Yourself" CD liner notes

- Songwriting – Amy Winehouse, Jimmy Hogarth
- Producer – Jimmy Hogarth
- Vocals – Amy Winehouse
- Bass, drums, guitar, percussion, programming – Jimmy Hogarth
- Horn, organ – Martin Slattery
- Mixing – Cameron Craig, Jimmy Hogarth

== Track listing ==
UK CD single ("Pumps / Help Yourself")

1. "Pumps"
2. "Help Yourself"
3. "(There Is) No Greater Love" (AOL Session)

UK CD single ("Help Yourself / Pumps" special edition)

1. "Help Yourself" (radio edit) – 4:00
2. "Pumps" (clean radio edit) – 3:19

== Charts ==
Chart (2004)	Peak position
Scottish Singles Sales (Official Charts)	83
UK Singles (Official Charts)	65
UK Hip Hop/R&B (Official Charts)	19
