= Fuck Me Pumps =

"Pumps"

Single by Amy Winehouse

from the album Frank
- A-side: "Help Yourself"
- B-side: "(There Is) No Greater Love"
- Released: 23 August 2004
- Recorded: 2003
- Studio: Creative Space (Miami)
- Genre: R&B; soul
- Length: 3:20
- Label: Island
- Songwriters: Amy Winehouse; Salaam Remi
- Producer: Salaam Remi

Amy Winehouse singles chronology
"In My Bed" / "You Sent Me Flying" (2004)	"Pumps" / "Help Yourself" (2004)	"Rehab" (2006)

Music video
- "Fuck Me Pumps" on YouTube

"Fuck Me Pumps" is a song by the English singer-songwriter Amy Winehouse from her debut studio album, Frank (2003). Written by Winehouse and Salaam Remi, the song was released in the United Kingdom as the album's fourth and final single on 23 August 2004 under the title "Pumps"—with "Help Yourself" as its coupling track—reaching number 65 on the UK Singles Chart. A clean radio edit was released for promotional purposes.

The track is an R&B song with humorous lyrics about stereotypical "gold-digging" girls, and in general women who rely on their looks to get by. The term "fuck-me pumps" or "FMPs" is a slang expression for sexy women's shoes, particularly those featuring bare heels. Chris Willman from Entertainment Weekly picked "Fuck Me Pumps" as the best song from Frank. The music video for "Pumps" shows Winehouse walking the streets with a microphone wearing pumps (high-heeled shoes).

== Personnel ==
Credits adapted from "Pumps / Help Yourself" CD liner notes

- Songwriting – Amy Winehouse, Salaam Remi
- Arranging, Producing – The Chameleon
- Vocals, guitar, additional pump steps – Amy Winehouse
- Electric bass, drums, beatbox – Salaam Remi
- Clarinet, flute, saxophone – Vincent Henry
- Electric piano – John Adams
- Assistant engineering – Steve "ESP" Nowa
- Mixing, recording – Gary "Mon" Noble

== Track listing ==
UK CD single

1. "Pumps"
2. "Help Yourself"
3. "(There Is) No Greater Love" (AOL Session)

== Charts ==
Chart (2004)	Peak position
Scottish Singles Sales (Official Charts)	83
UK Singles (Official Charts)	65
UK Hip Hop/R&B (Official Charts)	19

== Certifications ==
Region	Certification	Certified units/sales
United Kingdom (BPI)	Silver	200,000^{‡}
^{‡} Sales+streaming figures based on certification alone.

== See also ==
- Fuck-me shoes
