= Rehab (Amy Winehouse song) =

2006 single by Amy Winehouse

Single by Amy Winehouse

from the album Back to Black
- B-side: "Do Me Good"; "Close to the Front"
- Released: 23 October 2006
- Studio: Daptone, Chung King (New York City); Metropolis (London, England)
- Genre: Soul; rhythm and blues
- Length: 3:34
- Label: Island
- Songwriter: Amy Winehouse
- Producer: Mark Ronson

Amy Winehouse singles chronology
"Pumps" / "Help Yourself" (2004)	"Rehab" (2006)	"You Know I'm No Good" (2007)

Audio sample
- file; help

Music video
- "Rehab" on YouTube

Alternative cover
- Remix single cover

"Rehab" is a song written and recorded by the English singer-songwriter Amy Winehouse, from her second and final studio album Back to Black (2006). Produced by Mark Ronson, the lyrics are autobiographical and address Winehouse's refusal to enter a rehabilitation clinic for alcoholics. "Rehab" was released as the lead single from Back to Black in 2006, and it peaked at number seven in the United Kingdom on its Singles Chart and number nine in the United States on the Billboard Hot 100, becoming Winehouse's only top-10 hit in the US.

"Rehab" became an international critical and commercial success, and has been referred to as Winehouse's signature song. It won three Grammy Awards at the 50th ceremony, including Record of the Year, Song of the Year, and Best Female Pop Vocal Performance. It also won an Ivor Novello Award for Best Contemporary Song. Winehouse's public battle with drug and alcohol addiction, and subsequent death, have contributed to the song's continuing popularity and appearance in the media. The song has been covered by a number of artists, including Taking Back Sunday, Justin Timberlake, Fergie, and Kanye West.

== Background ==
"Rehab" was produced by Mark Ronson and released as the album's lead single in 2006 in the UK. The song addresses Winehouse's refusal to attend an alcohol rehabilitation centre after her management team encouraged her to go. Ronson expanded on the songwriting process when interviewed by DJ Zane Lowe for the BBC Radio's Radio 1's Stories, in an episode broadcast on BBC Radio 1 on 18 July 2011, five days before her death:

I was walking down the street with Amy. We were in New York and we'd been working together for about a week and we were walking to some store. She wanted to buy a present for her boyfriend and she was telling me about a specific time in her life that was.... I feel bad, like, talking about a friend like this, but I think I've told this story enough times.... but she hit, like, a certain low and her dad came over to try and talk some sense into her. And she was like, "He tried to make me go to rehab and I was like, 'Pfft, no no no.'" And the first thing I was like, "ding ding ding ding ding." Like, I mean I'm supposed to be like, "How was that for you?" and all I'm like is, "We've got to go back to the studio."

Mitch Winehouse, Amy's father, confirms Ronson's story about the origins of the song in his biography, Amy, My Daughter (2012). He writes that Ronson and Winehouse inspired each other musically, adding that Amy had written that line in one of her notebooks years before and told him that she was planning to write a song about that day. After Ronson heard the line during his and Amy's conversation in New York, he suggested they turn it into a song. The book says that was the moment when the song "came to life".

In the film Amy, director Asif Kapadia showed an interview with Mitch in which he explained that "he didn't believe [Winehouse] needed treatment [for her drug and alcohol addiction]". In an appearance on the British talk show Loose Women, Mitch clarified the comments he made in the film, saying that Kapadia misinterpreted what he actually said to Winehouse: "[...] I say that Amy didn't need to go to rehab, right? What I actually said was – referring to 2005 – Amy didn't need to go to rehab at that point. Later on was a different story altogether, which gives a totally, completely different meaning to what I said."

"Rehab" is a soul and R&B song. In the lyrics Winehouse mentions "Ray" and "Mr. Hathaway", in reference to Ray Charles and Donny Hathaway.

== Critical reception ==
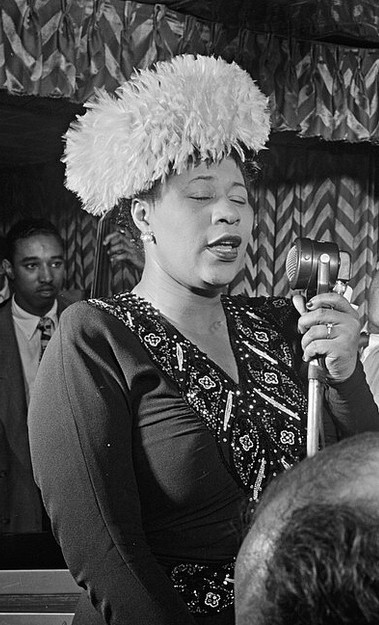
Winehouse's vocals on "Rehab" were compared to those of Ella Fitzgerald.

"Rehab" received widespread acclaim from music critics. Rolling Stone characterised it as a "Motown-style winner with a banging beat and a lovesick bad girl testifying like Etta James." People magazine called the track "instantly memorable." Billboard remarked that Winehouse's vocals on the song were "Shirley Bassey-meets-Ella Fitzgerald", calling the track "a better buzz than a double-gin martini." British trade paper Music Week called the song a "classy treat", praising Ronson's production and noting that the track's "overall effect is one of adroit skill with great hooks".

"Rehab" ranked number seven7 on Rolling Stone's list of the 100 Best Songs of 2007 and number 194 on the same magazine's updated list of The 500 Greatest Songs of All Time. This song also placed at number 92 on MTV Asia's list of Top 100 Hits of 2007. Time magazine named "Rehab" at number one on their 10 Best Songs of 2007. Writer Josh Tyrangiel praised Winehouse for her confidence, opining, "What she is is mouthy, funny, sultry, and quite possibly crazy" and, "It's impossible not to be seduced by her originality. Combine it with production by Mark Ronson that references four decades worth of soul music without once ripping it off, and you've got the best song of 2007." Entertainment Weekly put it on its end-of-the-decade, "best-of" list, saying, "Soon she'd be making headlines for all the wrong reasons. But back in 2007, we were all saying yes, yes, yes to the British belter's one-of-a-kind voice." In 2011, NME placed it at number eight on its list "150 Best Tracks of the Past 15 Years."

The song won the Ivor Novello Award for Best Contemporary Song for songwriting on 24 May 2007. In July 2007, the track won the Popjustice £20 Music Prize, which recognises the best British pop singles over the past year. In doing so, Winehouse became the third act to win the award, after Girls Aloud and Rachel Stevens. The single was voted as the best song of 2007 at The Village Voice's annual Pazz & Jop. On 10 February 2008, "Rehab" won three Grammy Awards: Record of the Year, Song of the Year and Best Female Pop Vocal Performance.

== Chart performance ==
Based solely on download sales, "Rehab" entered the UK Singles Chart at number 19, and when the physical single was released the following week, it climbed to number seven, Winehouse's highest chart position at the time by more than 50 places. By 25 October, the album was approaching five-time platinum in the UK, making it the best-selling record of 2007.

The song entered the Billboard Hot 100 at number 91 on the 31 March 2007 chart without an official single release. Winehouse's current single at the time, "You Know I'm No Good", entered one spot above, at number 90, the same week. After lingering in the bottom portions of the Hot 100 for several months, the song suddenly jumped 38 spots to number 10 on the 23 June chart, due to digital sales following Winehouse's live performance of the song on the MTV Movie Awards on 3 June 2007; sales of the official remix featuring rapper Jay-Z also had a small effect, helping it to peak in the 70s on the iTunes Top 100 in the US. After a change of rules in the UK allowing all digital downloads to be counted for the singles chart, "Rehab" re-entered the chart at number 20 for the week ending 13 January 2007, whilst "You Know I'm No Good" occupied the number 40 spot as a new entry on downloads alone.

The Ronson-produced song also topped at the top ten in more than 10 countries including Canada, Spain, Denmark, and Israel, peaking at number one in Norway and Hungary. It reached the top 20 in France, the Netherlands, Austria, Switzerland and Finland, attaining a peak position of number 23 on the European Hot 100 Singles.

Between October 2006 and June 2007, the single spent 34 consecutive weeks in the official UK top 75 and has re-entered it again several times since, most recently at number 29 on 31 July 2011 in the wake of the singer's death, giving it a current total of 59 weeks in the top 75, making it the joint 10th longest runner of all time, and 76 in the top 100.

It also became her first top ten hit on the Billboard Hot 100, peaking at number nine. The Recording Industry Association of America certified "Rehab" platinum on 11 February 2010 for sales of over 1 million copies. The song was an enduring hit throughout 2007; with UK sales of 131,415 in 2007 alone, it finished the year as the UK's fifth-sixth biggest-selling single. It is Winehouse's longest-running UK chart hit, but her Ronson collaboration "Valerie" has proven to be her biggest seller to date.

== Music video ==
The music video was directed by Phil Griffin and released in September 2006. It was shot at 33 Portland Place in London, a large Georgian residence built in 1775 and used in many music videos of the era due to its grand and largely original interior. It features Winehouse's band playing their instruments while she sings to the camera. The band members are wearing dressing gowns/bath robes throughout the video, with one member dressed similarly to Donny Hathaway. It begins with Winehouse rising from bed and then moving to the bathroom. For the second verse, Winehouse is on a chair in a psychiatrist's office, presumably explaining herself to an unseen therapist. In contrast to the lyrics, the video ends with Winehouse in rehab, sitting on a bed in a white-tiled clinical ward room with her band around her. The video was shot by director of photography Adam Frisch, FSF. On 31 May 2007, "Rehab" debuted on MTV's Total Request Live and later peaked at number one on 7 June. The music video was also nominated for Video of the Year at the 2007 MTV Video Music Awards, but lost out to Rihanna's "Umbrella."

== Live performances ==
On 12 March 2007, Winehouse performed the song live for her US television debut on the Late Show with David Letterman. For a while, she replaced "Ray" with "Blake", referring to her ex-husband, Blake Fielder-Civil, in live performances. She also replaced several times the lyrics, "I'm gonna lose my baby", with, "I'll never lose my baby".

== Track listings and formats ==
UK CD single (CD 1)
No.	Title	Length
1.	"Rehab" (Album Version)	3:36
2.	"Do Me Good"	4:20

UK CD Maxi-Single (CD 2)
No.	Title	Length
1.	"Rehab" (Album Version)	3:36
2.	"Close to the Front"	4:35
3.	"Rehab" (Desert Eagle Discs Vocal Mix)	5:00

UK digital download
No.	Title	Length
1.	"Rehab (Hot Chip Vocal Remix)" (Hot Chip Remix)	6:58
2.	"Rehab (Pharoahe Monch Remix)" (Amy Winehouse vs Pharoahe Monch)	3:36
3.	"Rehab (Vodafone Live)" (Live at TBA)	3:40

USA digital download
No.	Title	Length
1.	"Rehab (Remix)" (featuring Jay Z)	3:52
2.	"Rehab (Pharoahe Monch Remix)" (Amy Winehouse vs Pharoahe Monch)	3:36

Digital download – Remixes & B-Sides EP (2015)
No.	Title	Length
1.	"Rehab" (Demo Version)	3:38
2.	"Rehab" (Vodafone Live at TBA)	3:41
3.	"Rehab" (Hot Chip Remix)	6:58
4.	"Rehab" (Pharoahe Monch Remix)	3:36
5.	"Rehab" (featuring Jay Z)	3:52

== Charts ==
=== Weekly charts ===
2006–2008 weekly chart performance for "Rehab"
Chart (2006–2008)	Peak position
Australia (ARIA)	35
Austria (Ö3 Austria Top 40)	19
Belgium (Ultratop 50 Flanders)	10
Belgium (Ultratop 50 Wallonia)	24
Canada (Nielsen SoundScan)	4
Croatia (HRT)	5
Czech Republic (Rádio – Top 100)	49
Denmark (Tracklisten)	5
European Hot 100 Singles (Billboard)	23
Finland (Suomen virallinen lista)	15
France (SNEP)	11
Germany (GfK)	23
Hungary (Rádiós Top 40)	1
Ireland (IRMA)	21
Italy (FIMI)	9
Netherlands (Dutch Top 40)	17
Netherlands (Single Top 100)	14
New Zealand (Recorded Music NZ)	12
Norway (VG-lista)	1
Portugal Digital Songs (Billboard)	3
Scottish Singles Sales (Official Charts)	12
Slovakia (Rádio Top 100)	77
Spain Airplay (Promusicae)	2
Sweden (Sverigetopplistan)	51
Switzerland (Schweizer Hitparade)	11
UK Singles (Official Charts)	7
UK Hip Hop/R&B (Official Charts)	2
US Billboard Hot 100	9
US Adult Alternative Airplay (Billboard)	7
US Adult Pop Airplay (Billboard)	14
US Alternative Airplay (Billboard)	32
US Dance Airplay (Billboard)	3
US Hot Ringtones (Billboard)	22
US Pop 100 (Billboard)	10
US Pop Airplay (Billboard)	13
US Rhythmic Airplay (Billboard)	34

2011–2016 weekly chart performance for "Rehab"
Chart (2011–2016)	Peak position
Australia (ARIA)	27
Austria (Ö3 Austria Top 40)	32
Canadian Digital Song Sales (Billboard)	22
Denmark (Tracklisten)	33
France (SNEP)	17
Germany (Official German Charts)	27
Israel (Media Forest)	2
Netherlands (Single Top 100)	13
New Zealand (Recorded Music NZ)	13
Poland Airplay (ZPAV)	64
Scottish Singles Sales (Official Charts)	35
Spain (Promusicae)	7
Switzerland (Schweizer Hitparade)	12
UK Singles (Official Charts)	29
UK Hip Hop/R&B (Official Charts)	12
US Digital Song Sales (Billboard)	20
US R&B/Hip-Hop Digital Song Sales (Billboard)	7

2024 weekly chart performance for "Rehab"
Chart (2024)	Peak position
UK Singles Downloads (Official Charts)	73

=== Year-end charts ===
2006 year-end chart performance for "Rehab"
Chart (2006)	Position
UK Singles (OCC)	85

2007 year-end chart performance for "Rehab"
Chart (2007)	Position
Austria (Ö3 Austria Top 40)	68
Belgium (Ultratop 50 Flanders)	41
European Hot 100 Singles (Billboard)	53
Hungary (Rádiós Top 40)	16
Netherlands (Single Top 100)	70
Switzerland (Schweizer Hitparade)	38
UK Singles (OCC)	56
US Billboard Hot 100	74
US Dance/Mix Show Airplay (Billboard)	24

2008 year-end chart performance for "Rehab"
Chart (2008)	Position
Austria (Ö3 Austria Top 40)	69
Belgium (Ultratop 50 Flanders)	69
Belgium (Ultratop 50 Wallonia)	53
Hungary (Rádiós Top 40)	21
Spain (PROMUSICAE)	16
Switzerland (Schweizer Hitparade)	45
UK Singles (OCC)	200

== Certifications ==
Certifications and sales for "Rehab"
Region	Certification	Certified units/sales
Australia (ARIA)	5× Platinum	350,000^{‡}
Belgium (BRMA)	Gold	25,000^{*}
Brazil (Pro-Música Brasil)	Platinum	60,000^{‡}
Denmark (IFPI Danmark)	Platinum	15,000^{^}
Germany (BVMI)	Platinum	300,000^{‡}
Italy (FIMI)	Platinum	30,000^{*}
New Zealand (RMNZ)	3× Platinum	90,000^{‡}
Spain (Promusicae)	Platinum	60,000^{‡}
Switzerland (IFPI Switzerland)	Platinum	30,000^{^}
United Kingdom (BPI)	2× Platinum	1,200,000^{‡}
United States (RIAA)	Platinum	2,000,000
^{*} Sales figures based on certification alone.^{^} Shipments figures based on certification alone.^{‡} Sales+streaming figures based on certification alone.

== Release history ==
Release dates and formats for "Rehab"
Region	Date	Version(s)	Format(s)	Label(s)	Ref.
United Kingdom	23 October 2006	Original	CD; maxi CD	Island	
Germany	9 March 2007	Original	Maxi CD	Universal Music	
United States	22 May 2007	Original	Contemporary hit radio; rhythmic contemporary radio	Universal Republic	
United States	5 June 2007	Remix	Digital download	Universal Republic	
France	17 September 2007	Original	CD	AZ	

== Covers ==
Several musicians have released covers and alternate versions of the song.

- During live performances, New York band Taking Back Sunday often includes the chorus of a popular song in "A Decade Under the Influence" and the breakdown of "Cute Without the 'E' (Cut from the Team)", and, beginning in 2007, "Rehab" has been used.
- During his world tour in Zürich, Switzerland, in June 2007, pop singer Justin Timberlake sang the song's chorus in the third-person feminine after performing "Cry Me a River", widely reported to allude to Britney Spears.
- Besides, on 18 July 2007, American singer Fergie performed the song during a concert at Anaheim's House of Blues.
- While appearing at V Festival in Chelmsford, England on 18 August 2007, Kanye West played a tribute cover of "Rehab" for an absent Amy Winehouse, who had planned to perform at the festival but canceled due to exhaustion.
- L.A.-based Terra Naomi performed the song acoustically on YouTube in March 2008.
- Two remixes featuring American rappers Jay-Z and Pharoahe Monch were released in 2008.
- UK comedian Matt Roper in the guise of alter-ego Wilfredo covered "Rehab" at music festivals in 2008; his performance at Camden Town's Lockstock Festival in October that year can be viewed on YouTube.
- The cast of Glee covered "Rehab" on the "Pilot" episode, and reached the charts in several countries, including the US, UK, Ireland and Australia.
- French jazz pianist Jacky Terrasson covered "Rehab" on his 2012 album Gouache.
- Frankmusik has also covered the song.

== See also ==
- List of number-one songs in Norway
