= Stronger Than Me =

Single by Amy Winehouse

from the album Frank
- B-side: "What It Is"
- Released: 6 October 2003
- Recorded: 2003
- Studio: Creative Space (Miami)
- Genre: R&B; neo soul
- Length: 3:33
- Label: Island
- Songwriters: Amy Winehouse; Salaam Remi
- Producer: Salaam Remi

Amy Winehouse singles chronology
"Stronger Than Me" (2003)	"Take the Box" (2004)

Music video
- "Stronger Than Me" on YouTube

"Stronger Than Me" is a song by the English singer-songwriter Amy Winehouse from her debut studio album Frank (2003). Written by Winehouse and Salaam Remi, "Stronger Than Me" was released in the United Kingdom as the lead single on 6 October 2003, it ended up as the lowest-charting single from Frank and of Winehouse's career, peaking at number 71 on the UK Singles Chart. The song nevertheless won the Ivor Novello Award for Best Contemporary Song Musically and Lyrically in 2004.

The single for "Stronger Than Me" features an exclusive B-side, "What It Is". A rare live version of the song performed by Winehouse was featured in the documentary film biopic that's based on the life and death of Winehouse, Amy (2015) and the original version was included on the film's original soundtrack. It was said in the film that "Stronger Than Me" first sold over 800 copies a day after its initial release by Winehouse's previous guitarist, Ian Burter.

== Music video ==
A music video was produced to promote the single. The video features Winehouse entering a bar and finding her boyfriend drunk. Winehouse laments her boyfriend's failure to be the stronger and more dominant partner. The video continues as she returns her boyfriend to their apartment. Winehouse is seen being fondled by her drunken boyfriend as they struggle to exit the bar, and she looks on in disgust as he vomits in their taxi. As the video concludes, she's seen on a street struggling to get her unconscious boyfriend into their home. Failing to do so, Winehouse gives up, leaving him semi-conscious on the pavement and going inside as the song ends.

== Track listings and formats ==
UK CD single and digital download

1. "Stronger Than Me" – 3:33
2. "What It Is" – 4:44
3. "Take the Box" (The Headquarters Mix) – 3:49

UK promo CD single

1. "Stronger Than Me" (Album Version) – 3:33

UK 12" single

- Side A:
1. "Stronger Than Me" (Album Version)
2. "Stronger Than Me" (Curtis Lynch Jnr.)
- Side B:
1. "Stronger Than Me" (Harmonic 33 Remix)
2. "Stronger Than Me" (Acapella)

== Charts ==
Chart (2003–2004)	Peak position
Netherlands (Single Top 100)	87
UK Singles (OCC)	71
UK Hip Hop/R&B (OCC)	18

== Certifications ==
Region	Certification	Certified units/sales
New Zealand (RMNZ)	Gold	15,000^{‡}
United Kingdom (BPI)	Gold	400,000^{‡}
^{‡} Sales+streaming figures based on certification alone.
