= Teodross Avery =

American jazz tenor saxophonist

- Born: July 2, 1973 (age 52); Fairfield, California, U.S.
- Genres: Jazz
- Instruments: Tenor saxophone

Teodross Avery (born July 2, 1973) is an American jazz tenor saxophonist, who has released albums for the record labels including GRP Records and Impulse! Records.

A native of the San Francisco Bay Area, his 2019 album, After the Rain: A Night for Coltrane, was released on Tompkins Square Records in May that year. Harlem Stories: The Music of Thelonious Monk followed in September 2020.

== Discography ==
=== Albums ===
- In Other Words (GRP Records, 1994)
- My Generation (Impulse!, 1996)
- New Day New Groove (5th Power Records, 2001)
- Diva's Choice (CD Baby, 2009)
- Bridging the Gap: Hip Hop Jazz (BTG Music, 2011)
- Post Modern Trap Music (Katalyst Entertainment, 2017)
- After The Rain: A Night For Coltrane (Tompkins Square, 2019)
- Harlem Stories: The Music of Thelonious Monk (WJ3 Records, 2020)
