= You Won't Be Satisfied (Until You Break My Heart) =

Song
- Written: Teddy Powell; Larry Stock
- Released: 1946

"You Won't Be Satisfied (Until You Break My Heart)" is a popular song published in 1946.

It was written by Freddy James (pseudonym of Teddy Powell) and Larry Stock and published in 1946.

The biggest hit version was recorded by the Les Brown orchestra with vocalist Doris Day. This recording was released by Columbia Records as catalog number 36884. It first reached the Billboard Best Seller chart on February 14, 1946, and lasted 9 weeks on the chart, peaking at #5. Other recordings to reach the charts in 1946 were by Perry Como with The Satisfiers (No. 5) and by Ella Fitzgerald and Louis Armstrong (No. 10).

== Other versions ==
- Nat King Cole
- Dean Martin on Martin & Lewis radio show.
- Louis Prima - a 1946 single release on the Majestic label.
- Debbie Reynolds included the song on her 1959 album Debbie.
