= Luke Smith (session musician) =

- Website: http://lukesmithmusic.net

Luke Smith is a Keyboardist from Manchester, England, who has worked with numerous world class artists including George Michael, Eric Clapton, Rosie Gaines, Whitney Houston, Roy Ayers, Frank McComb, B. B. King, Phil Collins, Shaggy, Chaka Khan, Lulu, BeBe and CeCe Winans, Andrae Crouch and Noel Robinson.

In 1992 Luke spent two years with the pop group Hot Chocolate on their European tour as their main keyboard player. Smith later formed his own jazz band which supported Roy Ayres, Hugh Masekela and Earl Klugh among others.

At the beginning of 1995, Luke moved to London where he landed a job in the West End as Music Director of the sell out musical show Mama, I Want to Sing!.

Luke then went to Los Angeles on tour with the gospel choir The London Fellowship Choir, the first British choir to perform at the Gospel Music Workshop Of America.

In 2007, Luke performed with George Michael at the inaugural concert of the new Wembley Stadium.

Now based in London, Luke also plays keys for The AllStars Collective.
