= Amy Winehouse =

British singer-songwriter (1983–2011)

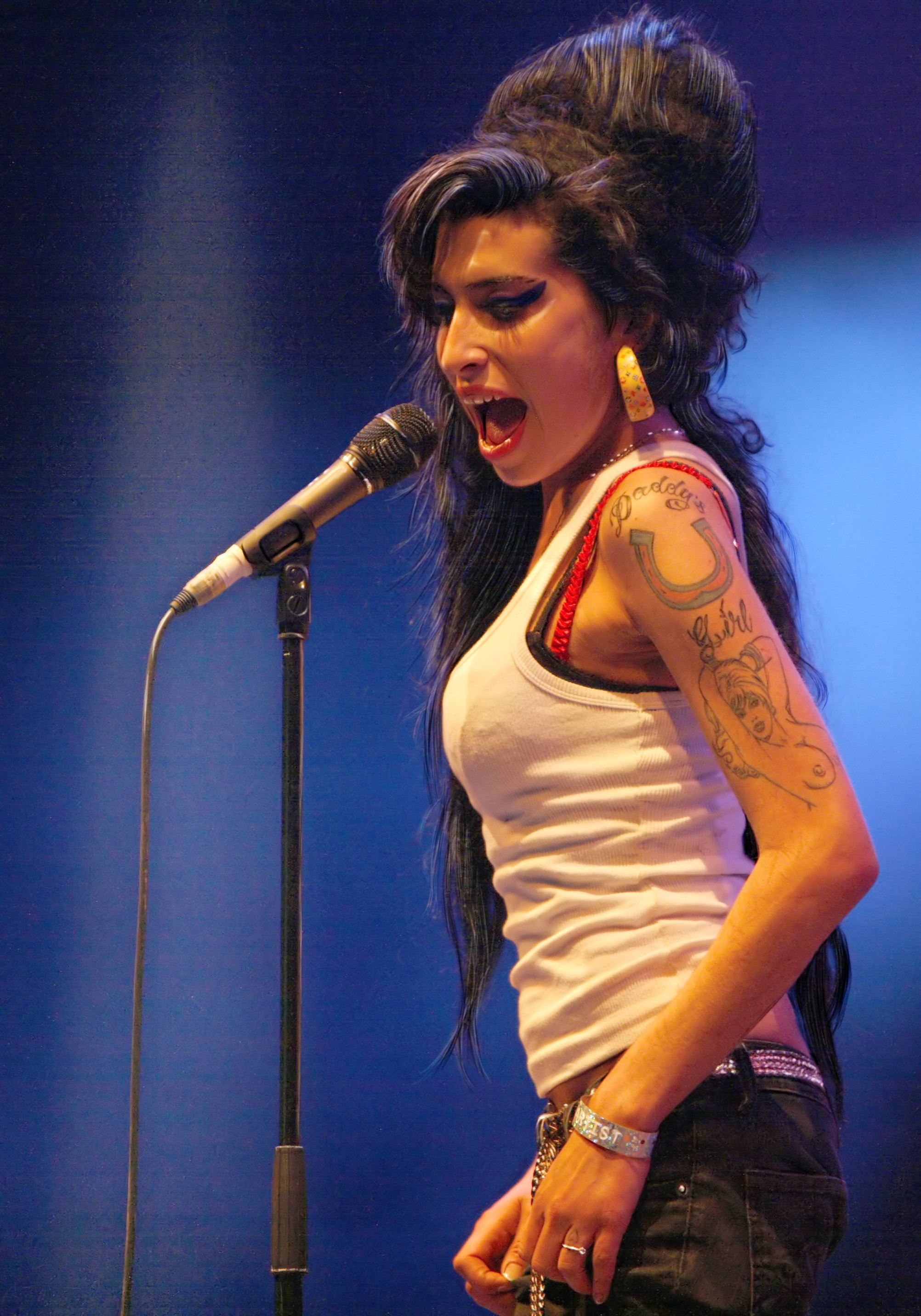
- Winehouse in 2007
- Born: Amy Jade Winehouse; 14 September 1983; Southgate, London, England
- Died: 23 July 2011 (aged 27); Camden Town, London, England
- Cause of death: Alcohol poisoning
- Resting place: Edgwarebury Cemetery, Barnet, North London
- Occupations: Singer; songwriter; businesswoman
- Years active: 2003–2011
- Works: Discography; songs recorded
- Spouse: Blake Fielder-Civil (m. 2007; div. 2009)
- Partners: Alex Clare (2006–2007); Reg Traviss (2010–2011; her death)
- Awards: Full list
- Musical career
- Origin: Camden Town, London, England
- Genres: Soul; R&B; jazz
- Instruments: Vocals; guitar
- Labels: Island; Lioness; Universal Republic; Republic
- Website: amywinehouse.com

Amy Jade Winehouse (14 September 1983 – 23 July 2011) was a British singer and songwriter. She is known for her distinctive contralto vocals, expressive and autobiographical songwriting, and eclectic blend of genres such as soul, rhythm and blues, and jazz. Her music, along with her fashion and highly publicised personal life, made her an influential figure in popular culture.

Born to a Jewish family in Enfield, London, Winehouse grew up in a jazz-influenced household. She was a member of the National Youth Jazz Orchestra in her youth, recording several songs before signing a publishing deal with EMI. After a friend passed her demo to a music executive, Winehouse signed with Island Records in 2002. She worked with producer Salaam Remi for her debut studio album, Frank (2003), which was commercially successful in the UK and drew critical acclaim for its mature songwriting and jazz-imbued production. Its lead single, "Stronger Than Me", earned the singer an Ivor Novello Award.

Inspired by 1960s girl groups and soul music, Winehouse recorded her second studio album, Back to Black (2006), with Remi, the Dap-Kings, and producer Mark Ronson. It became an international critical and commercial success and one of the best-selling albums of all time. Its lead single, "Rehab", was a worldwide top-ten song and won her a second Ivor Novello Award. At the 50th Annual Grammy Awards in 2008, Winehouse won five awards, tying the then-record for the most Grammys won by a female artist in a single night and becoming the first British woman to win five Grammys. Her wins included three of the "Big Four" categories—Best New Artist, Record of the Year, and Song of the Year for "Rehab"—along with Best Pop Vocal Album.

Winehouse's career was often overshadowed by substance abuse, mental illness, and addiction, culminating in her death from alcohol poisoning. Her brother believed that bulimia was also a factor. Winehouse's life and career were depicted in the documentary Amy (2015) and dramatised in the biopic Back to Black (2024). In 2023, Rolling Stone included Winehouse on its list of the 200 Greatest Singers of All Time. In 2025, Back to Black was preserved in the National Recording Registry by the Library of Congress.

== Early life ==
Amy Jade Winehouse was born on 14 September 1983 at Chase Farm Hospital in Gordon Hill in Enfield, London, to Jewish parents. Her father, Mitchell "Mitch" Winehouse, was an amateur singer and taxi driver, and her mother, Janis Winehouse (née Seaton), was a pharmacist. She had an older brother, Alex. Winehouse was raised in Southgate, London. When she was five, she began attending Osidge Primary School. She then started her secondary education at Ashmole School, where her grades were "surprisingly good" according to her mother. As a child, she attended a weekly cheder, a Jewish primary school. In a later interview, she said she disliked the school, recalling that she often begged her father to let her stay home and felt she "learned nothing about being Jewish" from attending.

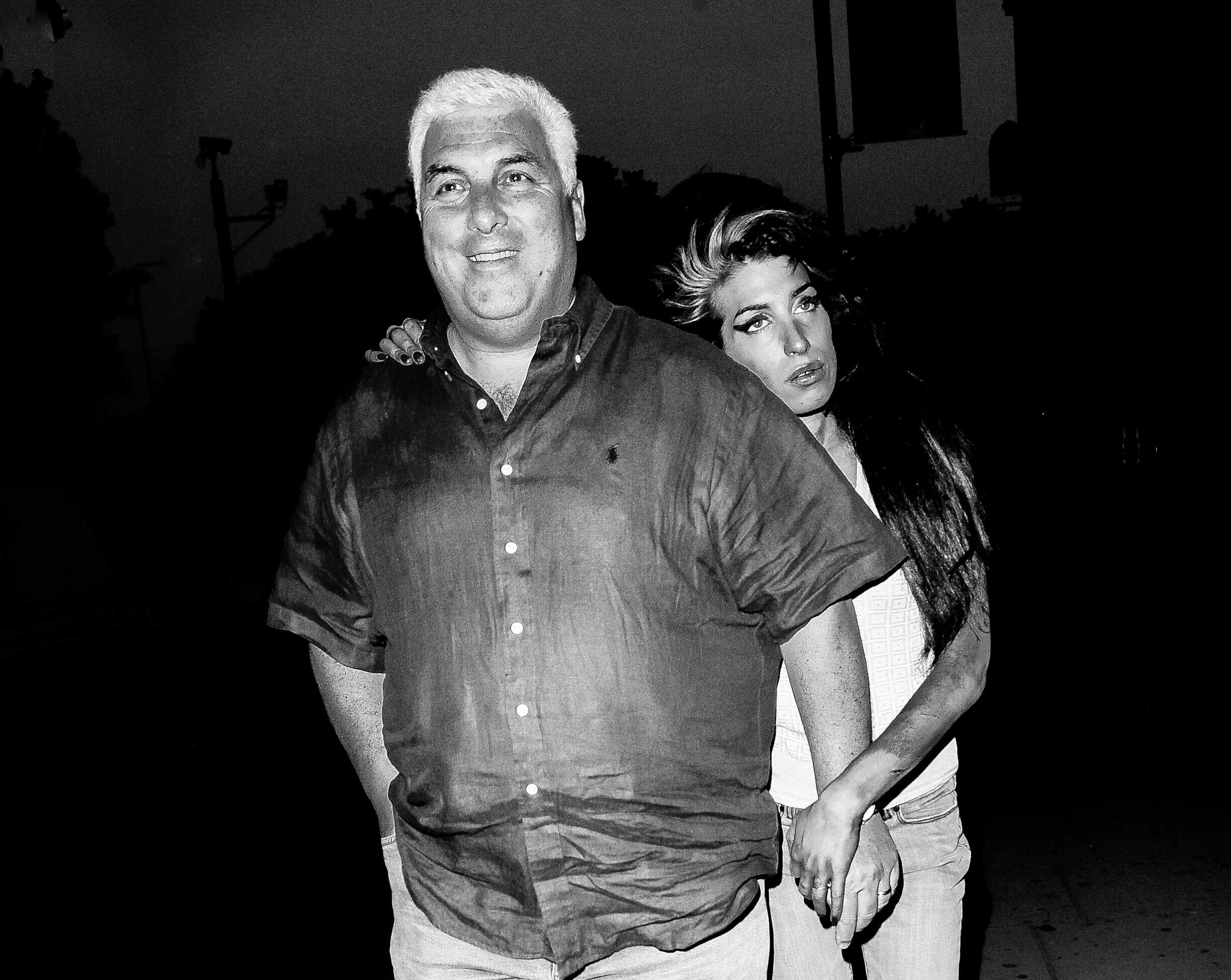
Winehouse and her father, Mitch, in 2008

Many of Winehouse's maternal uncles were professional jazz musicians. Her paternal grandmother, Cynthia, had been a singer and dated the jazz saxophonist Ronnie Scott. Cynthia, along with Winehouse's parents, nurtured her early interest in jazz. Mitch would frequently sing and play songs by musicians such as Frank Sinatra and Tony Bennett around the house. When reprimanded at school, Winehouse would sing "Fly Me to the Moon" before seeing the headmistress. Her parents separated when she was nine. She then lived with her mother and her mother's boyfriend in Whetstone, London, and spent weekends with her father and his girlfriend in Hatfield Heath, Essex.

In 1992, Cynthia encouraged Winehouse to attend the Susi Earnshaw Theatre School, where she spent Saturdays developing her singing, acting and tap dancing. With her childhood friend Juliette Ashby, she formed a short-lived rap duo called Sweet 'n' Sour. Winehouse later enrolled at the Sylvia Young Theatre School. At her audition, she sang "On the Sunny Side of the Street". Reports that she was expelled at 14 for "not applying herself" and for piercing her nose were denied by both Sylvia Young and her father, who said she simply transferred schools at 15. One of her teachers recalled her as a skilled writer, who said she could have become a novelist or journalist. She later attended the Mount School in Mill Hill and briefly went to the BRIT School in Selhurst, Croydon. After experimenting with her brother's guitar, Winehouse bought her own and soon began writing her own songs. Around the same time, she worked as an entertainment journalist for the World Entertainment News Network and was a vocalist for the National Youth Jazz Orchestra. Her best friend, the soul singer Tyler James, later sent a demo tape of hers to an A&R scout to help start her professional career.

== Career ==
=== 2002–2005: Career beginnings and Frank ===
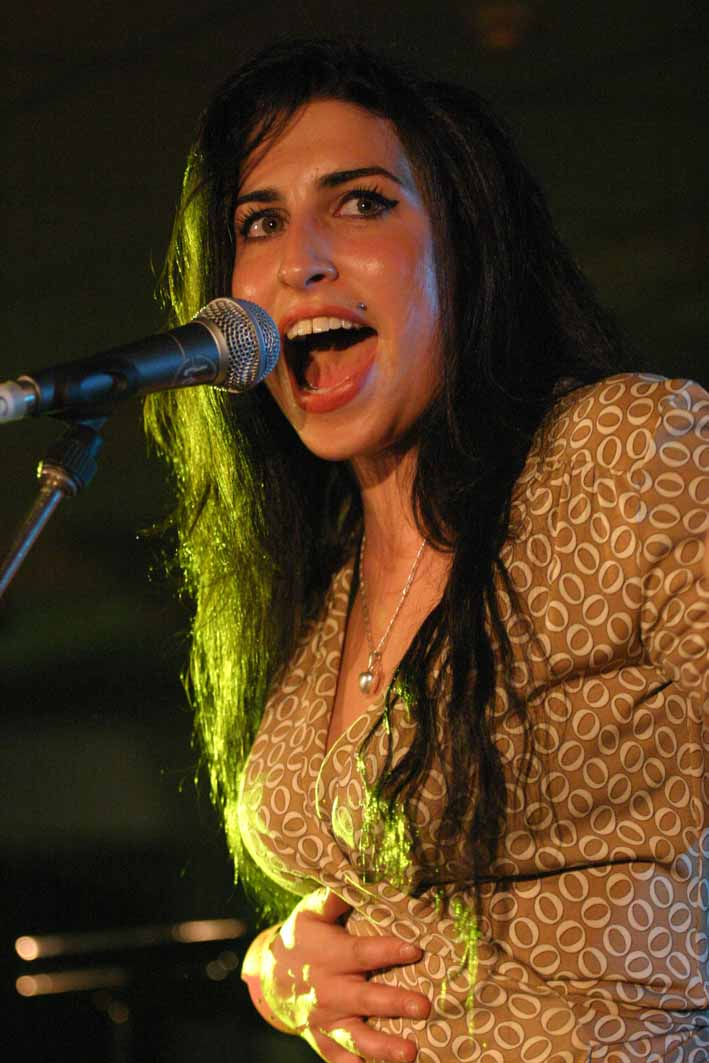
Winehouse performing live in 2004

Winehouse was signed to Simon Fuller's 19 Management in 2002 and was initially paid £250 a week against future earnings. While being developed by the management company, Winehouse was kept as a recording industry secret, although she was a regular jazz standards singer at the Cobden Club. Her future A&R representative at Island, Darcus Beese, heard of her by chance when the manager of the Lewinson Brothers showed him some productions of his clients, which featured Winehouse as key vocalist. When he asked who the singer was, the manager told him he was not allowed to say. Having decided that he wanted to sign her, it took several months of asking around for Beese to eventually discover who the singer was. By that time, Winehouse had already recorded a number of songs, signed a publishing deal with EMI, and formed a working relationship with producer Salaam Remi.

Beese introduced Winehouse to his boss, Island head Nick Gatfield, who shared his enthusiasm in signing the young artist. Winehouse was signed to Island while rival interest in her had started to build with representatives of EMI and Virgin Records starting to make moves. Beese told HitQuarters that he felt the excitement over an artist who was an atypical pop star for the time was due to a backlash against reality TV music shows, whose audiences starved for fresh, genuine young talent.

Winehouse's debut album, Frank, was released on 20 October 2003. Produced mainly by Salaam Remi, many of the songs were influenced by jazz and, apart from two covers, Winehouse co-wrote every song. The album received wide critical acclaim with compliments given to the "cool, critical gaze" in its lyrics. Winehouse's voice was compared with those of Sarah Vaughan and Macy Gray, among others.

The album entered the upper reaches of the UK Albums Chart in 2004 when it was nominated for the Brit Awards in the categories of British Female Solo Artist and British Urban Act. It went on to achieve platinum sales. Later in 2004, she and Remi won the Ivor Novello Award for Best Contemporary Song, for their first single together, "Stronger Than Me". The album was also shortlisted for the 2004 Mercury Music Prize. In the same year, she performed at the Glastonbury Festival (on the Jazz World stage), the V Festival and the Montreal International Jazz Festival. After the release of the album, Winehouse commented that she was "only 80 percent behind [the] album" because Island Records had overruled her preferences for the songs and mixes to be included.

=== 2006–2008: Back to Black and international success ===
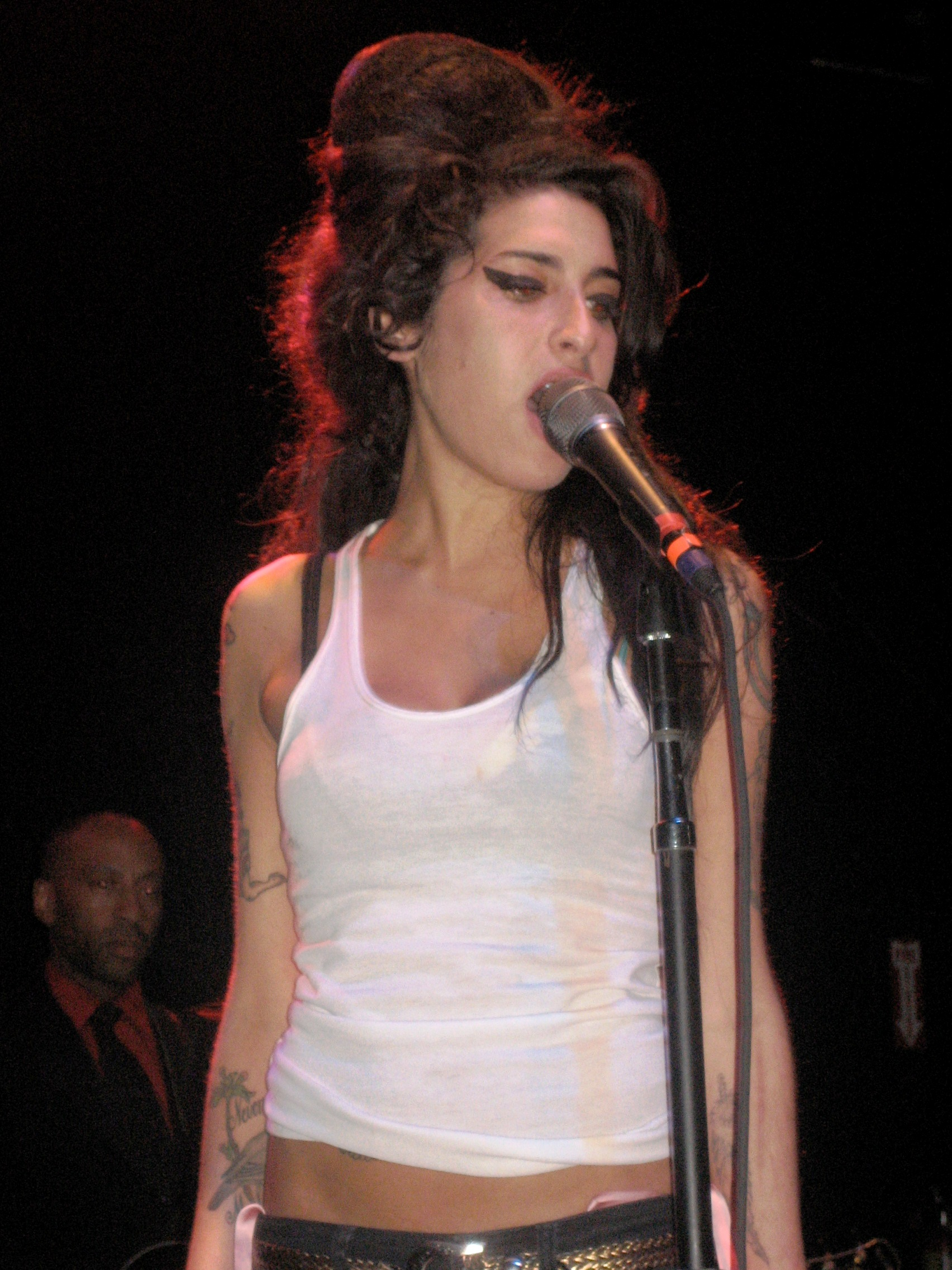
Winehouse at the Avalon in Boston, Massachusetts, in 2007

After the release of her first jazz-influenced album, Winehouse's focus shifted to the girl groups of the 1950s and 1960s. Winehouse hired New York singer Sharon Jones's longtime band, the Dap-Kings, to back her up in the studio and on tour. Mitch relates in Amy, My Daughter how fascinating watching her process was: her perfectionism in the studio and how she would put what she had sung on a CD and play it in his taxi outside to know how most people would hear her music. In May 2006, Winehouse's demo tracks such as "You Know I'm No Good" and "Rehab" appeared on Mark Ronson's New York City radio show on East Village Radio. These were some of the first new songs played on the radio after the release of "Pumps" and both were slated to appear on her second album. The 11-track album, completed in five months, was produced entirely by Salaam Remi and Ronson, with the production credits being split between them. Ronson said in a 2010 interview that he liked working with Winehouse because she was blunt when she did not like his work. She in turn thought that when they first met, he was a sound engineer and that she was expecting an older man with a beard.

Promotion of Back to Black soon began and, in early October 2006, Winehouse's official website was relaunched with a new layout and clips of previously unreleased songs. Back to Black was released in the UK on 30 October 2006. It went to number one on the UK Albums Chart for two weeks in January 2007, dropping then climbing back for several weeks in February. In the US, it entered at number seven on the Billboard 200. It was the best-selling album in the UK of 2007, selling 1.85 million copies over the course of the year. The first single released from the album was the Ronson-produced "Rehab". The song reached the top ten in the UK and the US. Time magazine named "Rehab" the Best Song of 2007. Writer Josh Tyrangiel praised Winehouse for her confidence, saying, "What she is is mouthy, funny, sultry, and quite possibly crazy" and "It's impossible not to be seduced by her originality. Combine it with production by Mark Ronson that references four decades worth of soul music without once ripping it off, and you've got the best song of 2007." The album's second single and lead single in the US, "You Know I'm No Good", was released in January 2007 with a remix featuring rap vocals by Ghostface Killah. It ultimately reached number 18 on the UK singles chart. The title track, "Back to Black", was released in the UK in April 2007 and peaked at number 25, but was more successful across mainland Europe. "Tears Dry on Their Own" and "Love Is a Losing Game" were also released as singles, but failed to achieve the same level of success.

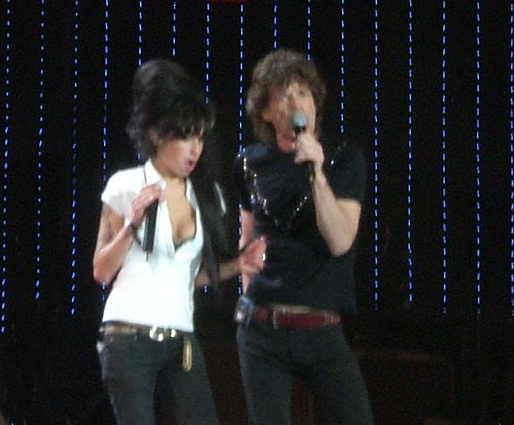
Winehouse with Mick Jagger at the Isle of Wight Festival on the Isle of Wight, England where she sang "Ain't Too Proud to Beg" with the Rolling Stones on 10 June 2007.

A deluxe edition of Back to Black was also released on 5 November 2007 in the UK. The bonus disc features B-sides, rare, and live tracks, as well as "Valerie". Winehouse's debut DVD I Told You I Was Trouble: Live in London was released the same day in the UK and 13 November in the US. It includes a live set recorded at London's Shepherd's Bush Empire and a 50-minute documentary charting the singer's career over the previous four years. Frank was released in the United States on 20 November 2007 to positive reviews. The album debuted at number 61 on the Billboard 200 chart. In addition to her own album, she collaborated with other artists on singles. Winehouse was a vocalist on the song "Valerie" on Ronson's solo album Version. The song peaked at number two in the UK upon its October single release. "Valerie" was nominated for a 2008 Brit Award for British Single of the Year. Her work with ex-Sugababe Mutya Buena, "B Boy Baby", was released on 17 December 2007. It served as the fourth single from Buena's debut album, Real Girl. Winehouse was also in talks of working with Missy Elliott for her album Block Party.

Winehouse promoted the release of Back to Black with headline performances in late 2006, including a Little Noise Sessions charity concert at the Union Chapel in Islington, London. On 31 December 2006, Winehouse appeared on Jools Holland's Annual Hootenanny and performed a cover of Marvin Gaye's "I Heard It Through the Grapevine" along with Paul Weller and Holland's Rhythm and Blues Orchestra. She also performed Toots and the Maytals' "Monkey Man". At his request, actor Bruce Willis introduced Winehouse before her performance of "Rehab" at the 2007 MTV Movie Awards in Universal City, California, on 3 June 2007. During the summer of 2007, she performed at various festivals, including Glastonbury Festival, as well as Lollapalooza in Chicago.

The rest of her tour did not go as well. In November 2007, the opening night of a 17-date tour was marred by booing and walkouts at the National Indoor Arena in Birmingham. A critic for the Birmingham Mail said it was "one of the saddest nights of my life ... I saw a supremely talented artist reduced to tears, stumbling around the stage and, unforgivably, swearing at the audience." Other concerts ended similarly, with, for example, fans at her Hammersmith Apollo performance in London saying that she "looked highly intoxicated throughout," until she announced on 27 November 2007, that her performances and public appearances were cancelled for the remainder of the year, citing her doctor's advice to take a complete rest. A statement issued by concert promoter Live Nation blamed "the rigours involved in touring and the intense emotional strain that Amy has been under in recent weeks" for the decision. Mitch wrote about her nervousness before public performances in his 2012 book, Amy, My Daughter. On 13 January 2008, Back to Black held the number-one position on the Billboard Pan European charts for the third consecutive week.

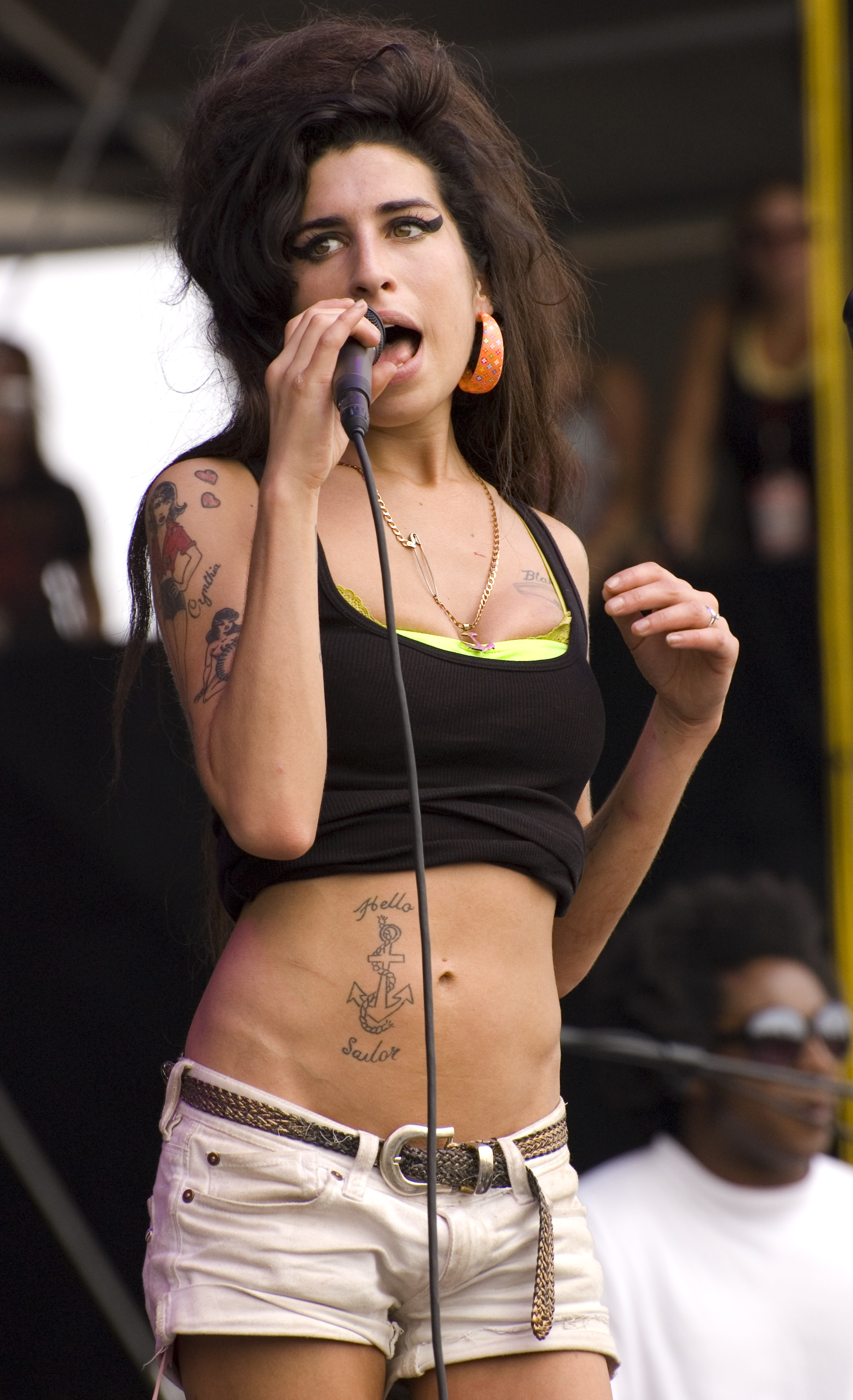
Winehouse performing at the Virgin Festival at Pimlico in Baltimore in 2007

On 10 February 2008, Winehouse received five Grammy Awards, winning in the following categories: Record of the Year, Song of the Year, Best Female Pop Vocal Performance for the single "Rehab", and Best Pop Vocal Album. The singer also earned a Grammy as Best New Artist, earning her an entry in the 2009 edition of the Guinness Book of Records for Most Grammy Awards won by a British Female Act. Additionally, Back to Black was nominated for Album of the Year. Ronson's work with her won the Grammy Award for Producer of the Year, in the non-classical category. She ended her acceptance speech for Record of the Year with, "This is for London because Camden Town ain't burning down," in reference to the 2008 Camden Market fire. Performing "You Know I'm No Good" and "Rehab" via satellite from London's Riverside Studios at 3 a.m. UK time, she could not be at the ceremony in Los Angeles as her visa approval had not been processed in time.

After the Grammys, the album's sales increased, catapulting Back to Black to number two on the US Billboard 200, after it initially peaked in the seventh position. On 20 February 2008, Winehouse performed at the 2008 Brit Awards at Earls Court in London, performing "Valerie" with Mark Ronson, followed by "Love Is a Losing Game". She urged the crowd to "make some noise for my Blake." A special deluxe edition of Back to Black topped the UK album charts on 2 March 2008. Meanwhile, the original edition of the album was ranked at number 30 in its 68th week on the charts, while Frank charted at number 35.

In Paris, she performed what was described as a "well-executed 40-minute" set at the opening of a Fendi boutique in early March. By 12 March, the album had sold a total of 2,467,575 copies—318,350 copies had been sold in the previous 10 weeks—putting the album on the UK's top-10 best-selling albums of the 21st century for the first time. On 7 April, Back to Black was in the top position of the pan-European charts for the sixth consecutive and thirteenth aggregate week. Amy Winehouse – The Girl Done Good: A Documentary Review, a 78-minute DVD, was released on 14 April 2008. The documentary features interviews with those who knew her at a young age, people who helped her achieve success, jazz music experts, and music and pop culture specialists.

At the 2008 Ivor Novello Awards in May, Winehouse became the first-ever artist to receive two nominations for the top award: Best Song Musically & Lyrically. She won the award for "Love Is a Losing Game" and was nominated for "You Know I'm No Good". "Rehab", a Novello winner for best contemporary song in 2006, also received a 2008 nomination for best-selling British song. Winehouse was also nominated for a 2008 MTV Europe Music Award in the Act of the Year category.

Although her father, manager and various members of her touring team reportedly tried to dissuade her, Winehouse performed at the Rock in Rio Lisboa festival in Portugal in May 2008. Although the set was plagued by a late arrival and problems with her voice, the crowd warmed to her. In addition to her own material she performed two Specials covers. Winehouse performed at Nelson Mandela's 90th Birthday Party concert at London's Hyde Park on 27 June 2008, and the next day at the Glastonbury Festival. On 12 July, at the Oxegen Festival in Ireland she performed a well-received 50-minute set which was followed the next day by a 14-song set at T in the Park.

On 16 August, she played at the Staffordshire leg of the V Festival, and the following day played the Chelmsford leg of the festival. Organisers said that Winehouse attracted the biggest crowds of the festival. Audience reaction was reported as mixed. On 6 September, Winehouse was Bestival's Saturday headliner, where she started 40 minutes late and was on stage for 35 minutes, before her performance was terminated because of a curfew. A clip of Winehouse's music was included in the "Roots and Influences" area that looked at connections between different artists at the Rock and Roll Hall of Fame Annex NYC, which opened in December 2008. One thread started with Billie Holiday, continued with Aretha Franklin and Mary J. Blige, and then finished with Winehouse. Back to Black was the world's seventh-biggest-selling album of 2008. The album's sales meant that the market performance of Universal Music Group's recorded music division did not drop to levels experienced by the overall music market. The album has sold more than 20 million copies worldwide, making it one of the best-selling albums of all time.

=== 2009–2011: Final projects before death ===
In a 2009 poll of U.S. residents conducted for VisitBritain by Harris Interactive, one-fifth of the participants indicated they had listened to Winehouse's music during the previous year. She performed with Rhythms del Mundo on their cover of the Sam Cooke song "Cupid" for an Artists Project Earth benefit album released in July that year.

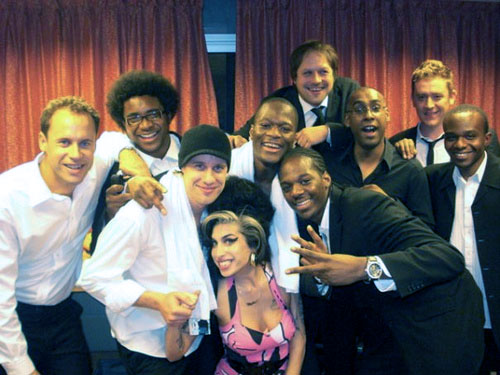
Winehouse backstage with her band in 2009

Winehouse and Ronson contributed a cover of Lesley Gore's "It's My Party" to the Quincy Jones tribute album Q Soul Bossa Nostra, released in November 2010. She had agreed to form a group with Questlove of the Roots, but her problems obtaining a visa delayed their working together. Salaam Remi had already created some material with Winehouse as part of the project. According to The Times, Universal Music pressed her for new material in 2008, but as of 2 September that year she had not been near a recording studio. In late October, Winehouse's spokesman was quoted as saying that Winehouse had not been given a deadline to complete her third album, for which she was learning to play drums.

In May 2009, Winehouse returned to performing at a jazz festival in Saint Lucia amid torrential downpours and technical difficulties. During her set, it was reported she was unsteady on her feet and had trouble remembering lyrics. She apologised to the crowd for being "bored" and ended the set in the middle of a song. During her stay in Saint Lucia, she worked on new music with Remi. On 23 August that year, Winehouse sang with the Specials at the V Festival on their songs "You're Wondering Now" and "Ghost Town".

Island claimed that a new album would be due for release in 2010. Island co-president Darcus Beese said, "I've heard a couple of song demos that have absolutely floored me." In July 2010, Winehouse was quoted as saying her next album would be released no later than January 2011, saying: "It's going to be very much the same as my second album, where there's a lot of jukebox stuff and songs that are... just jukebox, really." Ronson said at that time that he had not started to record the album. She performed "Valerie" with Ronson at a movie premiere but forgot some of the song's lyrics. In October, Winehouse performed a four-song set to promote her fashion line. In December 2010, she played a 40-minute concert at a Russian oligarch's party in Moscow, with the tycoon hand-selecting the songs.

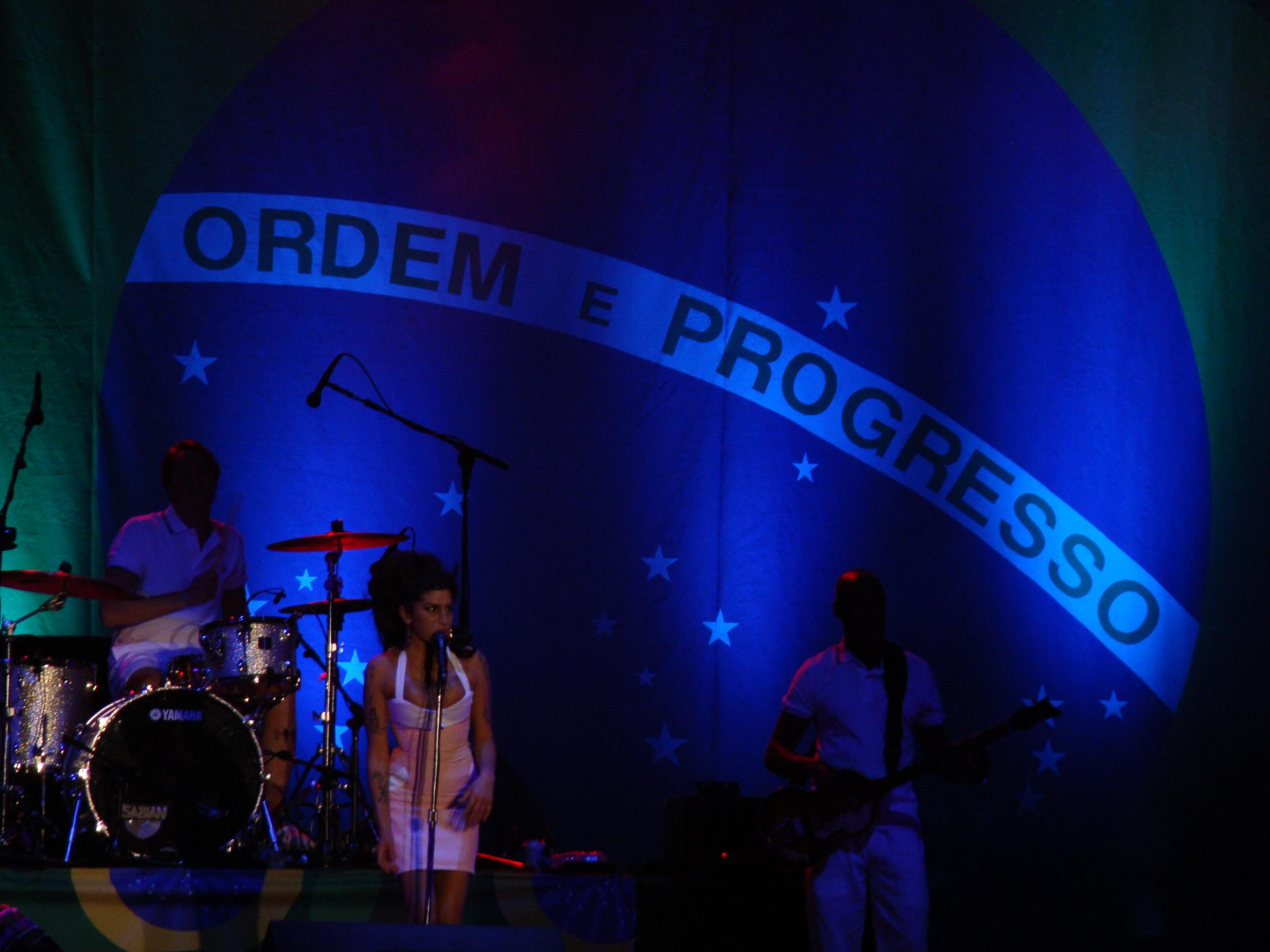
Winehouse performing in Brazil in January 2011, one of her last concerts before her death

In January 2011, Winehouse played five dates in Brazil, with opening acts of Janelle Monáe and Mayer Hawthorne. While performing in Florianópolis, Winehouse forgot the lyrics of her songs several times and had to be aided by the public and her band. During the concert, she only drank from a water bottle, but even so, on two occasions, she left the stage in the midst of the show for a period of about five minutes. Upon her return, the crowd showed strong compassion for her and praised Winehouse for continuing the performance. The following month, she cut a performance in Dubai short following booing from the audience. Winehouse was reported to be tired, distracted and "tipsy" during the performance.

On 18 June 2011, Winehouse started her 12-leg European tour in Belgrade. Local media described her performance as a scandal and disaster; she was booed off the stage due to her apparently being too drunk to perform. Serbian defence minister Dragan Šutanovac called Winehouse's performances "a huge shame and a disappointment". It was reported that she was unable to remember the city she was in, the lyrics of her songs or the names of the members of her band. She then pulled out of performances in Istanbul and Athens, which had been scheduled for the following week. On 21 June, it was announced that she had cancelled all shows of her tour and would be given "as long as it takes" to sort herself out.

Winehouse's last public appearance took place at Camden's Roundhouse on 20 July 2011, when she made a surprise appearance on stage to support her goddaughter Dionne Bromfield, who was singing "Mama Said" with the Wanted. Winehouse died three days later. Her last recording was a duet with American singer Tony Bennett for his album Duets II, released on 20 September 2011. Their single from the album, "Body and Soul", was released on 14 September 2011 on MTV and VH1 to commemorate what would have been her 28th birthday.

== Other ventures ==
=== Activism and philanthropy ===
Throughout her life, Winehouse donated her money, music and time to numerous charities and causes, particularly those concerned with children. She joined a campaign to stop a block of flats being built beside the George Tavern, a famous London East End music venue. Campaign supporters feared the residential development would end the spot's lucrative sideline as a film and photo location, on which it relies to survive. As part of a breast cancer awareness campaign, Winehouse appeared in a revealing photograph for the April 2008 issue of Easy Living magazine. In 2009, she appeared on a CD called Classics alongside musicians such as the Rolling Stones, the Killers and many Cuban musicians to raise awareness of climate change.

Winehouse loaned a vintage dress used in her video for "Tears Dry on Their Own" as well as a DVD to the British Music Experience, a new museum dedicated to the history of British pop music. The museum, located at the O_{2} Arena in London, opened on 9 March 2009. In March 2011, Winehouse donated more than £20,000 worth of clothes to a local charity shop in London. A Caribbean man, Julian Jean DeBaptiste, revealed that Winehouse had paid for his urgent surgery costing £4,000 during her stay in Saint Lucia in 2009. "I had surgery on 1 July 2009... it cost a fortune and Amy paid for the whole thing. I tried to thank her but she just hugged me and told me not to say anything. Her generosity gave me my life back."

=== Business ===
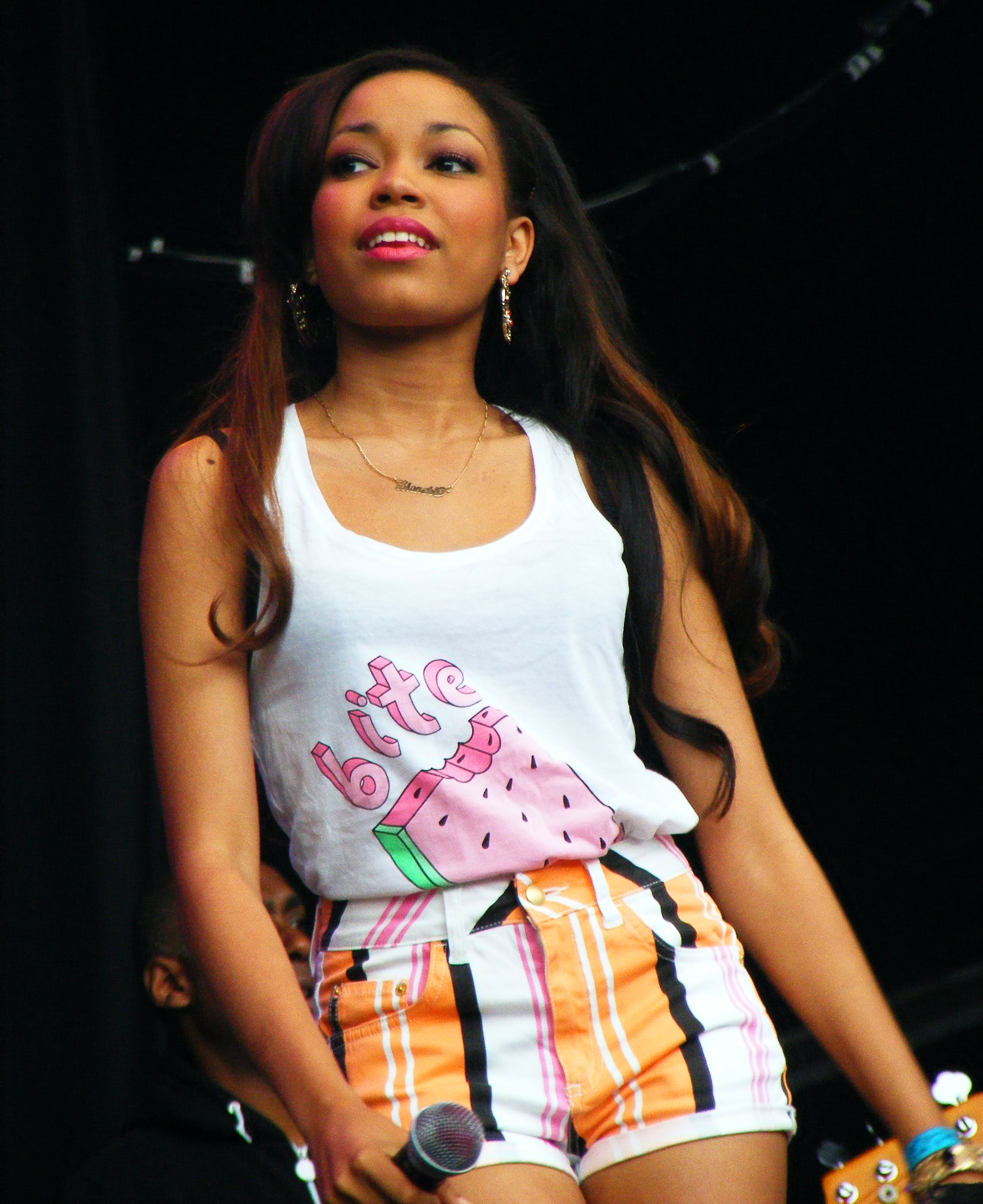
The first act on Winehouse's record label was her goddaughter Dionne Bromfield.

Winehouse had an estimated £10m fortune, tying her for tenth place in the 2008 The Sunday Times listing of the wealth of musicians under age 30. The following year her fortune had dropped to an estimated £5m. Her finances were run by her parents. It was reported she earned about £1m singing at two private parties during Paris Fashion Week as well as another £1m to perform at a Moscow Art Gallery for Russian oligarch Roman Abramovich.

In January 2009, Winehouse announced that she was launching her own record label. The first act on her Lioness Records was her 13-year-old goddaughter Dionne Bromfield. Her first album, featuring covers of classic soul records, was released on 12 October 2009. Winehouse is the backing singer on several tracks on the album and she performed backing vocals for Bromfield on the BBC's television programme Strictly Come Dancing on 10 October.

Winehouse and her family are the subject of a 2009 documentary shot by Daphne Barak titled Saving Amy. Winehouse entered into a joint venture in 2009 with EMI to launch a range of wrapping paper and gift cards containing song lyrics from her album Back to Black. On 8 January 2010, a television documentary, My Daughter Amy, aired on Channel 4. Saving Amy was released as a paperback book in January 2010.

Winehouse was a notable fan of the brand Fred Perry. She collaborated on a 17-piece fashion collection with the label, which was released for sale in October 2010. According to Fred Perry's marketing director, "We had three major design meetings where she was closely involved in product style selection and the application of fabric, colour and styling details," and gave "crucial input on proportion, colour and fit". The collection consists of "vintage-inspired looks including Capri pants, a bowling dress, a trench coat, pencil skirts, a longline argyle sweater and a pink-and-black checkerboard-printed collared shirt." At the behest of her family, three forthcoming collections up to and including autumn/winter 2012 that she had designed prior to her death were released. Following Winehouse's death, Fred Perry has donated 20% of the net revenue from the Amy Winehouse collection to the charity set up in Winehouse's name, the Amy Winehouse Foundation.

== Artistry ==
=== Musical style ===
Winehouse was known for her deep, expressive contralto vocals and her eclectic mix of musical genres, including rhythm and blues, soul, (sometimes labelled as blue-eyed soul and neo soul), and jazz. She was described as a "retro-soul" singer by Rolling Stone, The New York Times, The Nation, and Billboard. The BBC's Garry Mulholland called Winehouse "the pre-eminent vocal talent of her generation". According to AllMusic's Cyril Cordor, she was one of the UK's premier singers during the 2000s. "Fans and critics alike embraced her rugged charm, brash sense of humor, and distinctively soulful and jazzy vocals". In The Guardian, Caroline Sullivan later wrote that "her idolisation of Dinah Washington and the Ronettes distinguished her from almost all newly minted pop singers of the early 2000s, and her exceptionally-susceptible-to-heartbreak voice did the rest".

=== Image ===
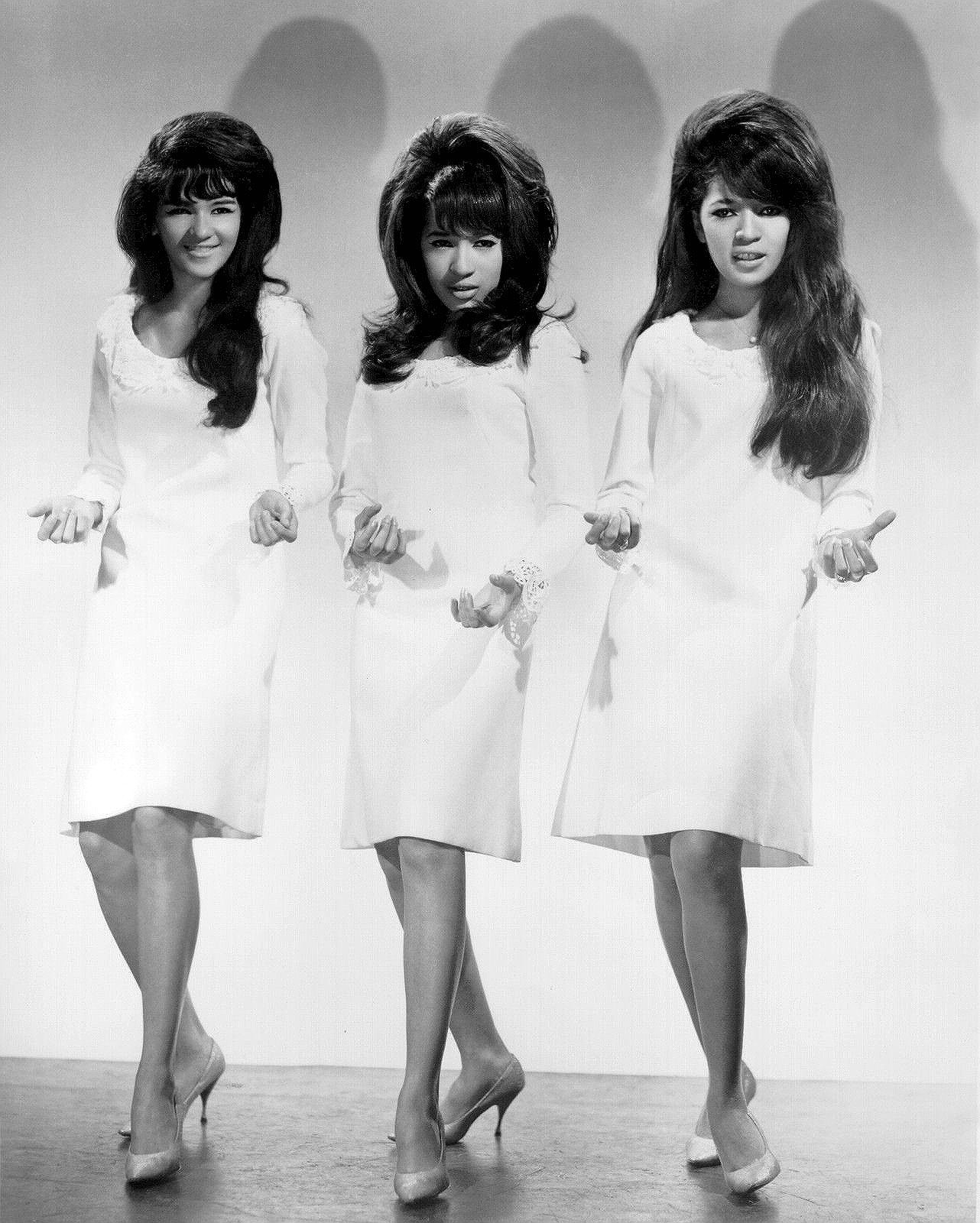
Winehouse was influenced by soul girl groups such as the Ronettes, whose look she imitated.

Winehouse's greatest love was 1960s girl groups. Her hairdresser, Alex Foden, borrowed her distinctive beehive hairdo (a weave) from the Ronettes and she borrowed her Cleopatra makeup from the same group. Her imitation was so successful that as The Village Voice reports, "Ronnie Spector—who, it could be argued, all but invented Winehouse's style in the first place when she took the stage at the Brooklyn Fox Theater with her fellow Ronettes more than 40 years ago—was so taken aback at a picture of Winehouse in the New York Post that she exclaimed, "I don't know her, I never met her, and when I saw that pic, I thought, 'That's me!' But then I found out, no, it's Amy! I didn't have on my glasses."

The New York Times style reporter Guy Trebay discussed the multiplicity of influences on Winehouse's style after her death. Trebay noted, "her stylish husband, Blake Fielder-Civil, may have influenced her look." Additionally, Trebay observed:

She was a 5-foot-3 almanac of visual reference, most famously to Ronnie Spector of the Ronettes, but also to the white British soul singer Mari Wilson, less famous for her sound than her beehive; to the punk god Johnny Thunders...; to the fierce council-house chicks... (see: Dior and Chanel runways, 2007 and 2008) ... to a lineage of bad girls, extending from Cleopatra to Louise Brooks's Lulu and including Salt-n-Pepa, to irresistible man traps that always seemed to come to the same unfortunate end.

Former Rolling Stone editor Joe Levy, who had put her on the magazine's cover, broke her look down this way:

Just as her best music drew on sampling – assembling sonic licks and stylistic fragments borrowed from Motown, Stax, punk and early hip-hop – her personal style was also a knowing collage. There was a certain moment in the '90s when, if you were headed downtown and turned left, every girl looked like Bettie Page. But they did not do what Winehouse did, mixing Bettie Page with Brigitte Bardot and adding that little bit of Ronnie Spector.

Winehouse's use of bold red lipstick, thick eyebrows and heavy eyeliner came from Latinas she saw in Miami, on her trip there to work with Salaam Remi on Back to Black. Her look was repeatedly denigrated by the British press. At the same time that the NME Awards nominated Winehouse in the categories of "Best Solo Artist" and "Best Music DVD" in 2008, they awarded her "Worst Dressed Performer". Winehouse was also ranked number two on Richard Blackwell's 48th annual "Ten Worst Dressed Women" list, behind Victoria Beckham.

== Contemporary media ==
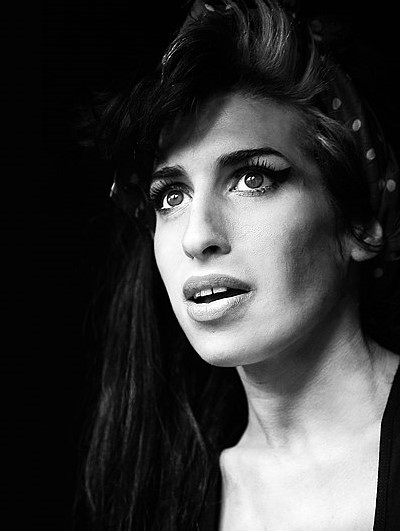
Winehouse at her Camden flat in 2008

Winehouse's dichotomous public image of critical and commercial success versus personal turmoil prompted significant media comment. The New Statesman called Winehouse "a filthy-mouthed, down-to-earth diva", while Newsweek called her "a perfect storm of sex kitten, raw talent and poor impulse control". Karen Heller with The Philadelphia Inquirer summarised the maelstrom this way:

She's only 24 with six Grammy nominations, crashing headfirst into success and despair, with a codependent husband in jail, exhibitionist parents with questionable judgement, and the paparazzi documenting her emotional and physical distress. Meanwhile, an haute designer Karl Lagerfeld appropriates her dishevelled style and eating issues to market to the elite while proclaiming her the new Bardot.

By 2008, her drug problems threatened her career. As Nick Gatfield, the president of Island Records, toyed with the idea of releasing Winehouse "to deal with her problems", he said, "It's a reflection of her status [in the US] that when you flick through the TV coverage [of the Grammys] it's her image they use." Post-Grammys, some questioned whether Winehouse should have been honoured with the awards given her recent personal and drug problems, including Natalie Cole, who introduced Winehouse at the ceremony and who herself battled substance-abuse problems while winning a Grammy for Best New Artist in 1975.

Winehouse was prevented from travelling to and performing at the Grammy Awards ceremony in the US due to failing a drug test, and the executive director of the UN Office on Drugs and Crime, Antonio Maria Costa, said that the alleged drug habits of Winehouse and other celebrities sent a bad message "to others who are vulnerable to addiction" and undermine the efforts of other celebrities trying to raise awareness of problems in Africa, now that more cocaine used in Europe passes through that continent. Winehouse's spokesperson noted that "Amy has never given a quote about drugs or flaunted it in any way. She's had some problems and is trying to get better. The U.N. should get its own house in order."

In January 2008, her record label stated it believed the extensive media coverage she had received increased record sales. In an April 2008 poll conducted by Sky News, Winehouse was named the second-greatest "ultimate heroine" by the UK population at large, topping the voting for that category of those polled under 25 years old. Psychologist Donna Dawson commented that the results demonstrated that women such as Winehouse, who had "a certain sense of vulnerability or have had to fight against some adversity in their lives", received recognition.

In July 2008, BBC Radio Scotland's head, Jeff Zycinski, stated that the BBC, and media in general, were complicit in undermining celebrities, including Winehouse. He said that public interest in the singer's lifestyle did not make her lifestyle newsworthy. Rod McKenzie, editor of the BBC Radio One programme Newsbeat, replied: "If you play [Amy Winehouse's] music to a certain demographic, those same people want to know what's happening in her private life. If you don't cover it, you're insulting young licence fee payers." In The Scotsman, English singer and songwriter Lily Allen was quoted to have said – "I know Amy Winehouse very well. And she is very different to what people portray her as being. Yes, she does get out of her mind on drugs sometimes, but she is also a very clever, intelligent, witty, funny person who can hold it together. You just don't see that side."

With the paparazzi taking photographs of her wherever they could, Winehouse obtained an injunction against a leading paparazzi agency, Big Pictures, under the Protection from Harassment Act 1997; the resultant court order issued by the High Court in 2009 banned them from following her. Photographers were also banned from following her within 100 metres of her London home and photographing Winehouse in her home or the homes of her friends and relatives. According to a newspaper report, sources close to the singer said legal action was taken out of concern for the safety of Winehouse and those close to her.

== Personal life ==
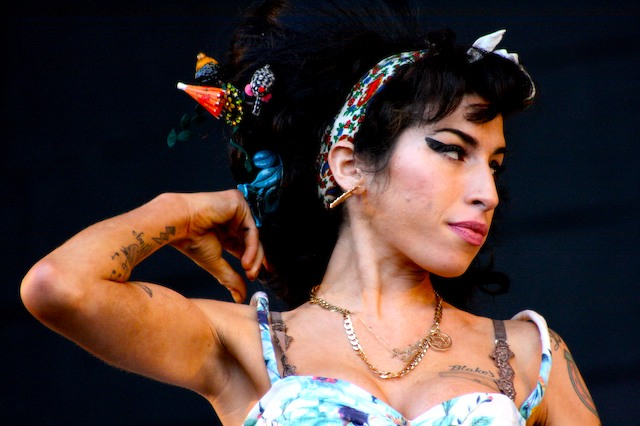
Winehouse with her Star of David medallion in 2008

Winehouse was raised Jewish and expressed pride in her heritage, although she was not religious. In one interview, she said: "[B]eing Jewish to me is about being together as a real family. It's not about lighting candles and saying a bracha." She also frequently performed wearing a Star of David medallion.

In 2013, the Jewish Museum London ran an exhibition titled "Amy Winehouse: A Family Portrait" in her memory. The museum researched her paternal great-great-grandfather's arrival from Minsk in 1890 and how the family settled in London, starting out in working-class jobs before moving into middle-class work. Winehouse had 14 known tattoos, including "Daddy's Girl" on her left arm for her father and a pin-up girl with the name "Cynthia" on her right arm in memory of her grandmother.

In 2011, there were reports that Winehouse was in the process of adopting a 10-year-old girl from St. Lucia, Dannika Augustine. According to Dannika and her family, Winehouse had formed a strong bond with the poverty-stricken girl during her lengthy stays on the island. Dannika referred to Winehouse as her mother and said they had a close, loving relationship. Her grandmother, Marjorie Lambert, said Winehouse had expressed a strong desire to adopt Dannika and was willing to move to St. Lucia to be her full-time mother. Winehouse's representative denied the claims, stating that the adoption story was not true.

=== Relationships ===
Winehouse dated chef-musician Alex Clare in 2006, while on a break from her on–off boyfriend and future husband, Blake Fielder-Civil. She and Clare lived together briefly, and Clare later sold his story to the News of the World, which published it under the headline "Bondage Crazed Amy Just Can't Beehive in Bed."

Fielder-Civil, a former video production assistant, had dropped out of Bourne Grammar School and moved to London at 16 from his native Lincolnshire. He married Winehouse on 18 May 2007 in Miami Beach, Florida. In a June 2007 interview, Winehouse admitted she could sometimes be violent toward him after drinking, saying: "If he says one thing I don't like, then I'll chin him." In August 2007, they were photographed, bloodied and bruised, in London after an alleged fight, although she said her injuries were self-inflicted. Winehouse's parents and in-laws publicly expressed concerns, the latter fearing the pair might commit suicide. Fielder-Civil's father encouraged fans to boycott Winehouse's music, and Winehouse's father said this would not help. Fielder-Civil was quoted in a tabloid as saying he introduced Winehouse to crack cocaine and heroin.

From 21 July 2008 to 25 February 2009, Fielder‑Civil was imprisoned after pleading guilty to charges of perverting the course of justice and grievous bodily harm with intent. The incident, in July 2007, involved his assault of a pub landlord that broke the victim's cheekbone, and Winehouse was briefly arrested in connection with it. According to the prosecution, the landlord accepted £200,000 as part of a deal to "effectively throw the [court] case and not turn up", and he testified that the money belonged to Winehouse. She pulled out of a meeting with the men involved in the plot to attend an awards ceremony. Her father, who managed her finances, denied the payoff came from her. During a visit with Mitch at the prison in July 2008, Fielder-Civil reportedly said that he and Winehouse would cut themselves to ease withdrawal. Winehouse also reportedly confessed to having an affair in 2008.

When Winehouse was spotted with aspiring actor Josh Bowman on holiday in Saint Lucia in early January 2009, she said she was "in love again, and I don't need drugs." She commented that her "whole marriage was based on doing drugs" and that "for the time being I've just forgotten I'm even married." On 12 January, Winehouse's spokesman confirmed that "papers have been received" for what Fielder-Civil's solicitor said were divorce proceedings based on a claim of adultery. In March, Winehouse was quoted as saying, "I still love Blake and I want him to move into my new house with me—that was my plan all along ... I won't let him divorce me. He's the male version of me and we're perfect for each other." An uncontested divorce was granted on 16 July 2009 and became final on 28 August 2009. Fielder-Civil received no money in the settlement.

Winehouse was in a relationship with the British writer and film director Reg Traviss from early 2010 until her death. According to media reports and a biography written by her father, Traviss and Winehouse had planned to marry and intended to have children. Conflicting reports state that Winehouse and Fielder-Civil had begun a relationship that same year and had discussed remarriage. In July 2008, when Rolling Stone reporter Claire Hoffman asked Winehouse if she was in a relationship with Pete Doherty, she replied, "We're just good friends", adding: "I asked Pete to do a concept EP, and he made this face, he looked at me like I'd pooed on the floor. He wouldn't do it. We're just really close." After Winehouse's death, Doherty said that he and Winehouse had been lovers at one point.

=== Substance use and mental health ===
Winehouse's substance use disorder was the subject of extensive media attention over the years. In 2005, she went through a period of drinking, heavy drug use, and weight loss. People who saw her at the end of that year and in early 2006 reported a rebound that coincided with the writing of Back to Black. Her family believes that the mid-2006 death of her grandmother, who had been a stabilising influence, set her off into addiction. In August 2007, Winehouse cancelled several shows in the UK and Europe, citing exhaustion and ill health. She was hospitalised during this period for what was reported as an overdose of heroin, ecstasy, cocaine, ketamine and alcohol. In interviews, she admitted to problems with self-harm, depression, and eating disorders. Because of her personal issues, The Washington Post pre-wrote an obituary.

Winehouse told the Los Angeles Times that drugs were to blame for her hospitalisation and said: "I really thought that it was over for me then." Soon afterwards, her father commented that when he made public statements about her problems he was using the media because it seemed the only way to get through to her. In an interview with The Album Chart Show on British television, Winehouse said she was manic depressive and not alcoholic, adding that it sounded like "an alcoholic in denial".

In December 2007, Winehouse's spokesman reported that she was in a physician-supervised programme and was channelling her difficulties by writing a lot of music. In January 2008, the British tabloid The Sun posted a video in which Winehouse appeared to be smoking crack cocaine and speaking of having taken ecstasy and Valium. The event took place on Friday 18 January in the early hours of the morning. Shortly after the alleged crack cocaine incident, her father moved in with her to keep her under "24-hour watch". In late January, Winehouse reportedly entered a rehabilitation facility for a two-week treatment programme. On 26 March, her spokesman said she was "doing well". By late April 2008, her erratic behaviour, including an allegation of assault, caused fear that her drug rehabilitation efforts had been unsuccessful. Her father and manager then sought to have her detained under the Mental Health Act of 1983. Her dishevelled appearance during and after a scheduled club night in September 2008 prompted new rumours of a relapse. Photographers said she appeared to have cuts on her arms and legs.

According to her physician, Winehouse quit using illegal substances in 2008. In an October 2010 interview, speaking of her decision to stop taking drugs, she said: "I literally woke up one day and was like, 'I don't want to do this any more.'" Alcohol then emerged as a problem, with Winehouse abstaining for a few weeks and then lapsing into alcohol use. Her physician said she was treated with Librium for alcohol withdrawal and anxiety and underwent psychological and psychiatric evaluations in 2010, but refused psychological therapy. Before her death, Winehouse was examined by a psychiatrist and psychologist, and doctors recommended dialectical behaviour therapy (DBT). DBT is based upon the biosocial theory of mental illness and is the first therapy experimentally demonstrated to be generally effective in treating borderline personality disorder.

=== Violence and legal difficulties ===
In 2006, Winehouse admitted to punching a female fan in the face after the fan criticised her relationship with Fielder‑Civil. She then attacked Fielder-Civil as he tried to calm her down, kneeing him in the crotch. In October 2007, Winehouse and Fielder-Civil were arrested in Bergen, Norway, for possession of seven grams of cannabis. They were released and fined 3850 kroner (around £350). Winehouse first appealed the fines, but later dropped the appeal. On 26 April 2008, she was cautioned after admitting to police that she had slapped a 38-year-old man in the face, a "common assault" offence. She voluntarily turned herself in and was held overnight. Police said that on her arrival, she was "in no fit state" to be interviewed.

Ten days later, Winehouse was arrested on suspicion of possessing drugs after a video of her apparently smoking crack cocaine was passed to police in January, but she was released on bail a few hours later because they could not confirm, from the video, what she was smoking. The Crown Prosecution Service considered charging her but cleared her when it could not establish that the substance in the video was a controlled drug. Some members of Parliament criticised the decision not to bring charges. Two London residents were subsequently convicted of conspiracy to supply cocaine and ecstasy to Winehouse, leading to a two-year prison sentence for one and a two-year community order for the other.

On 5 March 2009, Winehouse was arrested and charged with common assault after dancer Sherene Flash claimed Winehouse hit her in the eye at the September 2008 Prince's Trust charity ball. Winehouse's spokesperson announced the cancellation of her US Coachella Festival appearance in light of the new legal issue, and Winehouse pleaded not guilty in court on 17 March. At her trial on 23–24 July, she was charged with "deliberate and unjustifiable violence" while appearing to be under the influence of alcohol or another substance. She testified that she did not punch Flash but tried to push her away because she was scared of her. She cited her worry that Flash would sell her story to a tabloid, Flash's height advantage, and Flash's "rude" behaviour. On 24 July, Winehouse was found not guilty, with the court noting that all but two witnesses were intoxicated at the time and that medical evidence did not show "the sort of injury that often occurs when there is a forceful punch to the eye."

On 19 December 2009, Winehouse was arrested for a third time on charges of common assault and public order offence after assaulting the front-of-house manager of the Milton Keynes Theatre when he asked her to move to a different seat after noisy participation in the pantomime and advised her not to drink more. She pleaded guilty and received a conditional discharge.

=== Respiratory and other health problems ===
On 23 June 2008, Winehouse's publicist corrected earlier misstatements by Mitch that his daughter had early-stage emphysema, saying she instead had signs of what could lead to early-stage emphysema. He also said her lungs were operating at 70 percent capacity and that she had an irregular heartbeat, caused by her chain smoking crack cocaine. Mitch said doctors had warned that if she continued smoking crack cocaine she would have to wear an oxygen mask and would eventually die. In a radio interview, he said she was responding "fabulously" to treatment, which included nicotine patches. British Lung Foundation spokesman Keith Prowse noted that the condition could be managed with treatment and said it was not normal for a person her age, but that "heavy smoking and inhaling other substances like drugs can age the lungs prematurely". Norman H. Edelman of the American Lung Association explained that if she stopped smoking her lung function would decline at a normal rate, but continued smoking would lead to a more rapid decline.

Winehouse was released from the London Clinic 24 hours after returning from a temporary leave to perform at Nelson Mandela's 90th birthday celebration and at a concert in Glastonbury, and continued receiving treatment as an outpatient. In July 2008, she said she had been diagnosed with "some areas of emphysema" and said she was getting herself together by "eating loads of healthy food, sleeping loads, playing my guitar, making music and writing letters to my husband every day." She also kept a vertical tanning bed in her flat. Winehouse began precautionary testing on her lungs and chest on 25 October 2008 at the London Clinic for what was reported as a chest infection, leaving and returning at will. She returned to the hospital on 23 November 2008 due to a reported reaction to her medication.

== Death ==
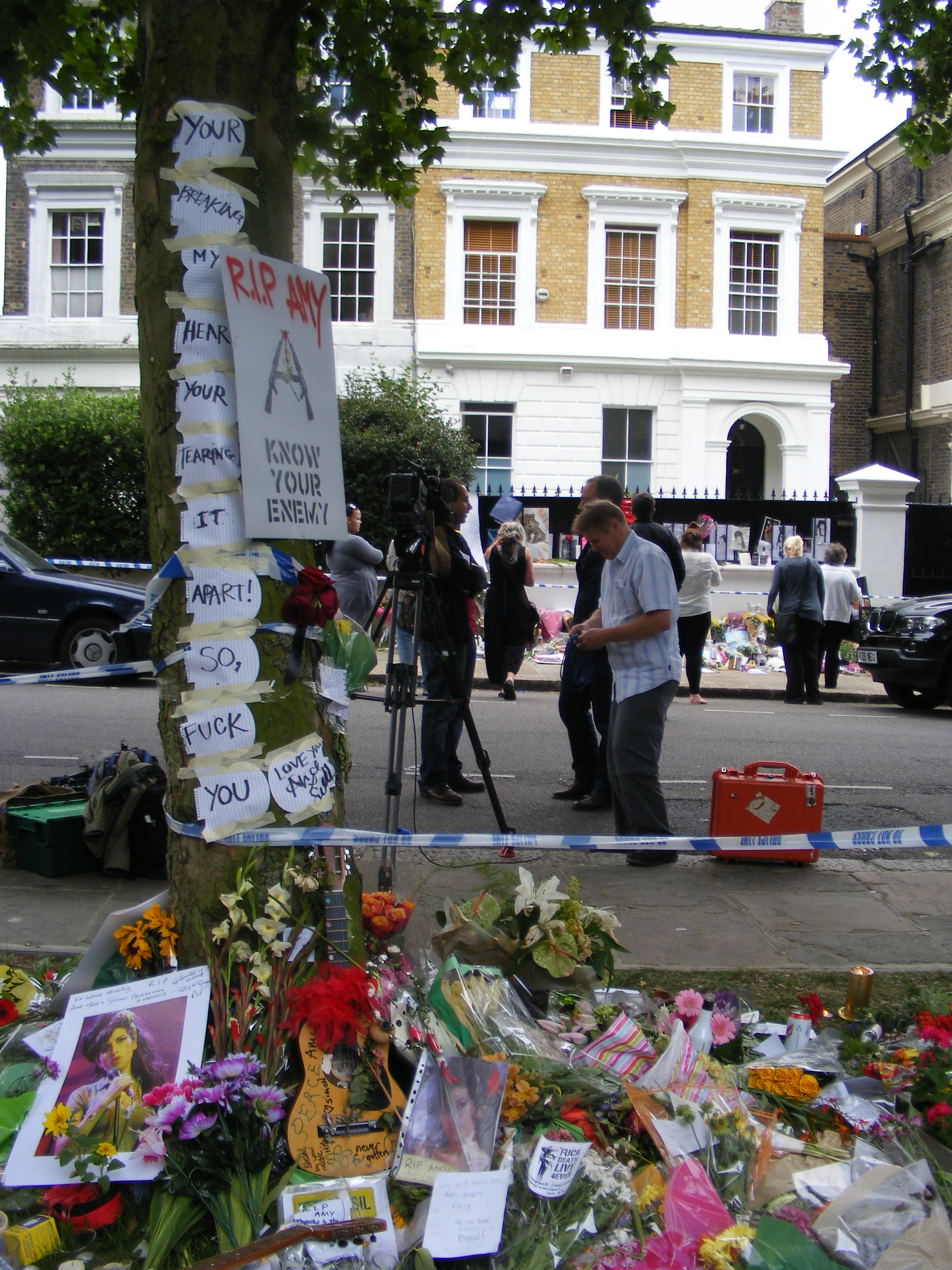
Tributes outside Winehouse's home at Camden Square in the days following her death

Winehouse's bodyguard, Andrew Morris, said he had arrived at her residence three days before her death and felt she had been somewhat intoxicated. Two days after, her mother likewise said she had acted "out of it." This was the same day Winehouse was visited by her doctor for one of her routine check-ups due to her fragile state, although no abnormalities were noted: "The doctor was happy with her condition. When he left on Friday night he had no concerns. Less than 24 hours later she was found dead." After the check-up, Winehouse called her doctor to confess her feelings regarding her codependency, stating "I don't want to die", and describing how she had attempted sobriety but could not achieve it.

Morris said he continued to observe her drinking moderately over the next few days and later recalled that she had been "laughing, listening to music and watching TV at 2 a.m. the day of her death". Another source claimed she was watching old re-runs of past performances and reminiscing. At 10 a.m. BST on 23 July 2011, Morris saw her lying on her bed and tried, unsuccessfully, to rouse her. This did not raise suspicion because she usually slept late after a night out. According to Morris, shortly after 3 p.m., he checked on her again and found her in the same position, leading to a further check in which he concluded she was not breathing and had no pulse. He said he called emergency services. At 3:54 p.m., two ambulances reached Winehouse's home in Camden, London. Winehouse was pronounced dead at the scene. Shortly afterwards, the Metropolitan Police confirmed her death.

After her death was announced, media and camera crews gathered near Winehouse's residence. Forensic investigators entered the flat as police cordoned off the street outside; they recovered one small and two large bottles of vodka from her room. After her death, Winehouse broke her second Guinness World Record for the most songs by a woman to appear simultaneously on the UK singles chart, with eight. Her record label, Universal Republic, released a statement saying: "We are deeply saddened at the sudden loss of such a gifted musician, artist and performer."

With little verified information regarding the cause of death, there was considerable speculation. Various reports suggested a fatal Class A drug, such as an ecstasy overdose, or a lethal cocktail. Winehouse's father denied these claims, saying: "Three years ago, Amy conquered her drug dependency. She was the happiest she has been for years." By August 2011, speculation about illegal drugs was disproven by a toxicology report finding no illegal substances in her system. The coroner's report, released in October 2011, stated that Winehouse's blood alcohol content was 416 mg per 100 ml (0.416%), more than five times the legal drink-drive limit. According to the coroner, the "unintended consequence" of so much alcohol was her "sudden and unexpected death", and the verdict was "death by misadventure".

On 17 December 2012, British authorities reopened the probe into Winehouse's death, after ruling that the first coroner had not been qualified for the role. The second inquest, delivered on 8 January 2013, matched the conclusions of the first. Coroner Dr. Shirley Radcliffe found that "She (Winehouse) voluntarily consumed alcohol, a deliberate act that took an unexpected turn in that it caused her death." The verdict was misadventure due to alcohol poisoning.

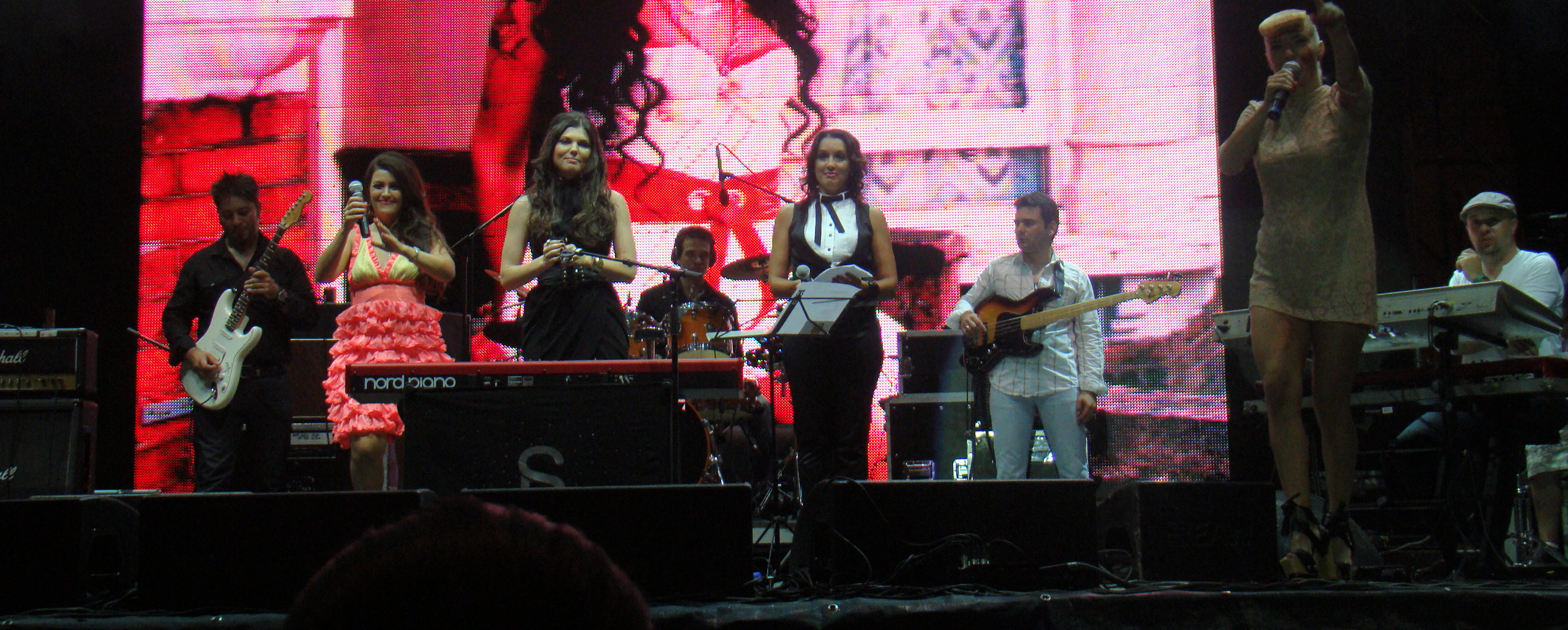
Romanian singers Rona Hartner, Paula Seling, Nico and Maria Radu performing at a memorial Amy Winehouse concert in Bucharest on 23 October 2011

Initial reports after her death stated that Winehouse had left a will, which had been altered after her divorce from Fielder-Civil; however, it later emerged that she had not left a will, and her estate, worth around £4 million, was inherited by her parents. Winehouse's death at the age of 27 prompted media comparisons to other musicians who died at that age, collectively referred to as the 27 Club. In a June 2013 interview, Winehouse's brother said he believed his sister's eating disorder and the consequent physical weakness were the primary cause of her death:

She suffered from bulimia very badly. That's not, like, a revelation — you knew just by looking at her ... She would have died eventually, the way she was going, but what really killed her was the bulimia ... I think that it left her weaker and more susceptible. Had she not had an eating disorder, she would have been physically stronger.

Winehouse's funeral, held on 26 July 2011 at Edgwarebury Lane Cemetery in North London, was a private ceremony attended by family and friends. Her mother and father, close friends Nick Grimshaw and Kelly Osbourne, producer Mark Ronson, goddaughter Dionne Bromfield and her boyfriend Reg Traviss were among those in attendance at the private service led by Rabbi Frank Hellner. Her father delivered the eulogy, saying "Goodnight, my angel, sleep tight. Mummy and Daddy love you ever so much." Carole King's "So Far Away" closed the service, with mourners singing along as it was one of Winehouse's favourite songs. She was later cremated at Golders Green Crematorium. The family planned to sit a two-day shiva. On 16 September 2012, Winehouse's ashes were buried alongside those of her grandmother at Edgwarebury Lane Cemetery.

== Legacy ==
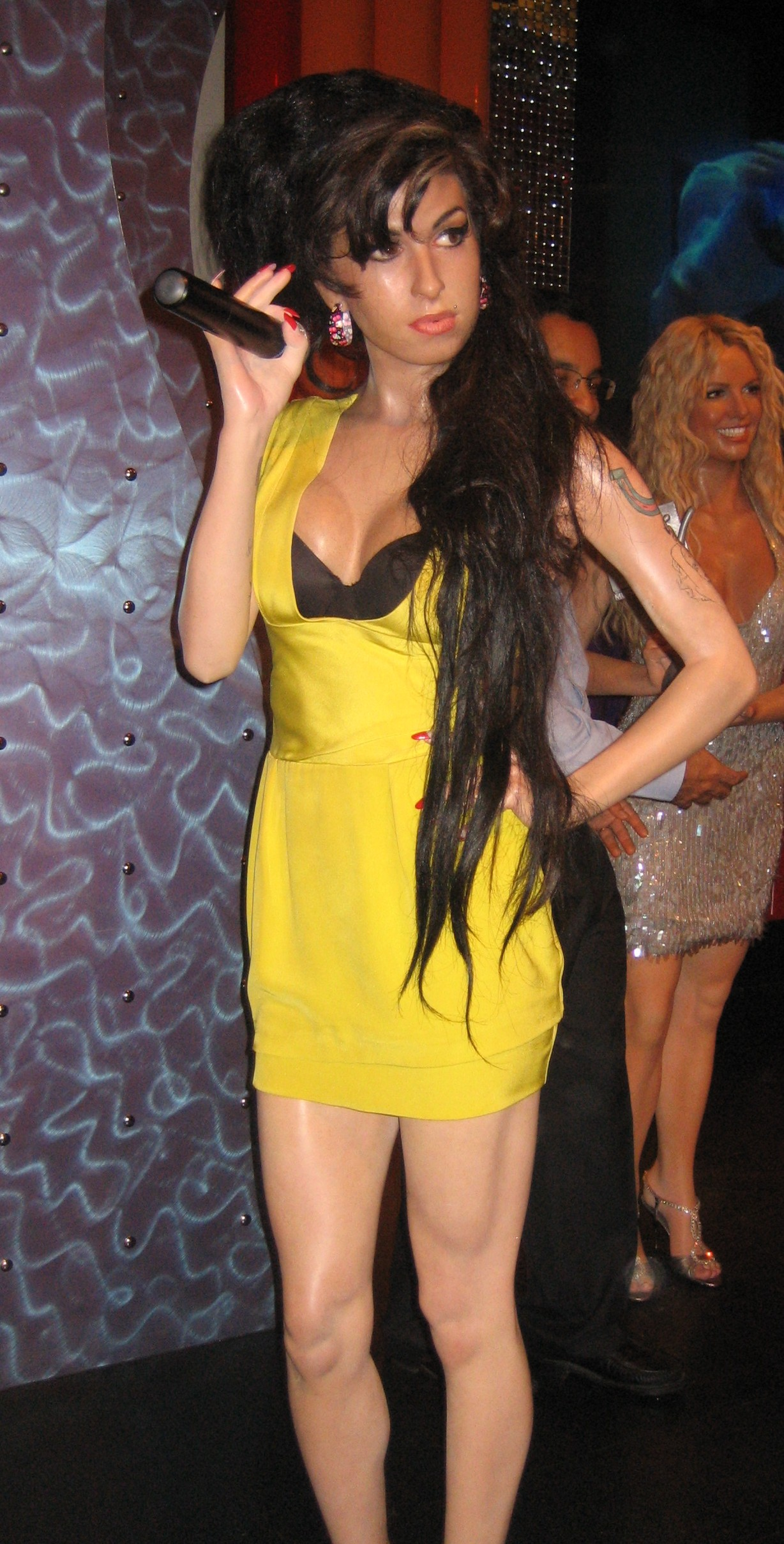
Wax figure of Winehouse at Madame Tussauds in London

Soon after Winehouse's death, a number of prominent critics assessed the singer's legacy. Maura Johnston from The Village Voice said, "When she was on, Winehouse had few peers—she wasn't an octave-jumper like other big divas of the moment, but her contralto had a snap to it that enriched even the simplest syllables with a full spectrum of emotion". Sasha Frere-Jones of The New Yorker proclaimed, "Nobody can match Winehouse's unique transitions or her utterly weird phrasings. She sounded like an original sixties soul star, developed when the landscape had no rules. But now untrammelled traditionalism is in the lead and her beautiful footnote has been cut short. American soul—through visionaries like Erykah Badu and Janelle Monáe and Jill Scott—had moved on. But Winehouse was a fine shepherd of the past."

Artists who have credited Winehouse as an influence or for paving the way for them include Adele, Duffy, Lady Gaga, Raphael Saadiq, Anthony Hamilton, John Legend, Bruno Mars, Tove Lo, Jessie J, Emeli Sandé, Victoria Justice, Paloma Faith, Lana Del Rey, Sam Smith, Florence Welch, Halsey, Alessia Cara, Estelle, Daya, Raye, Jorja Smith, Lauren Jauregui, Olivia Dean, Sienna Spiro, Billie Eilish, Remi Wolf, and Lola Young. Artists who have paid tribute to Winehouse include Nicki Minaj, M.I.A., Lady Gaga, Kelly Osbourne, Rihanna, George Michael, Adele, Dita Von Teese, Courtney Love, Patti Smith, who wrote "This Is the Girl" as an homage to Winehouse, and the rock band Green Day, who wrote a song in her tribute titled "Amy".

Winehouse's parents have each written memoirs about their daughter and donated the proceeds from both books to the Amy Winehouse Foundation. Mitch's biography, titled Amy: My Daughter, was published in 2012. Her mother published Loving Amy: A Mother's Story, in 2014. A documentary film, Amy (2015), directed by Asif Kapadia and produced by James Gay-Rees, was released on 3 July 2015. The film covers Winehouse's life, her relationships, her struggles with substance abuse both before and after her career blossomed, and her death. In 2018, a documentary film based on Winehouse's album Back to Black, Amy Winehouse – Back to Black, was released. In July 2021, a new documentary titled Reclaiming Amy aired on BBC Two to mark the 10th anniversary of Winehouse's death. The film was primarily based on the perspective and narrated by her mother and included intimate stories of those who were close to Winehouse until the end of her life, including close friends Naomi Parry (Winehouse's stylist), Catriona Gourlay and Chantelle Dusette.

On 9 October 2017, it was announced by Winehouse's father that a West End/Broadway musical on Amy is in the works. Mitch revealed the news at the Amy Winehouse Foundation Gala event in London. In July 2022, it was reported that a feature film biopic, entitled Back To Black (2024) was to be produced by StudioCanal UK, distributed by Focus Features and directed by Sam Taylor-Johnson. The script was written by Matt Greenhalgh and it was to be made with the full cooperation of Amy's father and her estate.

=== Amy Winehouse Foundation ===
After the singer's death by alcohol intoxication in July 2011, the Amy Winehouse Foundation was set up by Winehouse's family and launched on 14 September 2011 (which would have been Winehouse's 28th birthday), with her brother Alex as an employee. Its aim is to help vulnerable or disadvantaged young people, and it works with other charitable organisations to provide frontline support. Its central office is in North London, but it also has an office in New York (operating under the name 'The Amy Winehouse Foundation US'). Jon Snow is a patron for the charity, with Barbara Windsor also before she died in 2020, and ambassadors include Jess Glynne, Patsy Palmer, Jessie Wallace, Keira Chaplin and Mica Paris. In October 2015, Mark Ronson became a patron. Amy's brother Alex works full-time for the foundation, having given up his career as an online music journalist.

The charity itself works to prevent the effects of drug and alcohol misuse on young people, and it also aims to support, inform and inspire vulnerable and disadvantaged young people to help them reach their full potential. On 12 March 2013, with the help of ex-addict Russell Brand, the Foundation launched the Amy Winehouse Foundation Resilience Programme For Schools across the UK which aims to provide effective education around drugs, alcohol and dealing with emotional issues.

== Achievements ==
Winehouse has sold more than 30 million records worldwide. At the time of her death, Winehouse had sold more than 1.75 million singles and more than 3.98 million albums in the United Kingdom. Meanwhile, she had sold about 3.4 million tracks and 2.7 million albums in the United States as of the same date.

Among the awards and recognition for her debut album Frank, Winehouse earned an Ivor Novello Award from the British Academy of Songwriters for Best Contemporary Song ("Stronger Than Me"), a Brit Award nomination for Best British Female Solo Artist, and an inclusion in Robert Dimery's 2006 book, 1001 Albums You Must Hear Before You Die. Her second studio album, Back to Black, produced numerous nominations, including two Brit Awards (Best British Album, and won her Best British Female Solo Artist), six Grammy Awards (including five wins), four Ivor Novello Awards, four MTV Europe Music Awards, three MTV Video Music Awards, three World Music Awards, and it was nominated for the Mercury Prize (Album of the Year) and a MOBO Awards (Best UK Female).

On 13 February 2012, Winehouse was ranked 26th on VH1's 100 Greatest Women in Music list. In March 2017, singer-songwriter Bob Dylan said he was enjoying listening to Winehouse's last record (Back to Black), and called her "the last real individualist around". In 2023, Rolling Stone ranked Winehouse at number 83 on its list of the 200 Greatest Singers of All Time. In 2025, The Guardian included Back To Black on their list of defining events in popular culture of the 21st century. Also in 2025, Back to Black was preserved in the United States National Recording Registry by the Library of Congress.

== Discography ==
- Frank (2003)
- Back to Black (2006)

== See also ==
- List of British Grammy Award winners and nominees
- List of deaths through alcohol
