= Amy Winehouse discography =

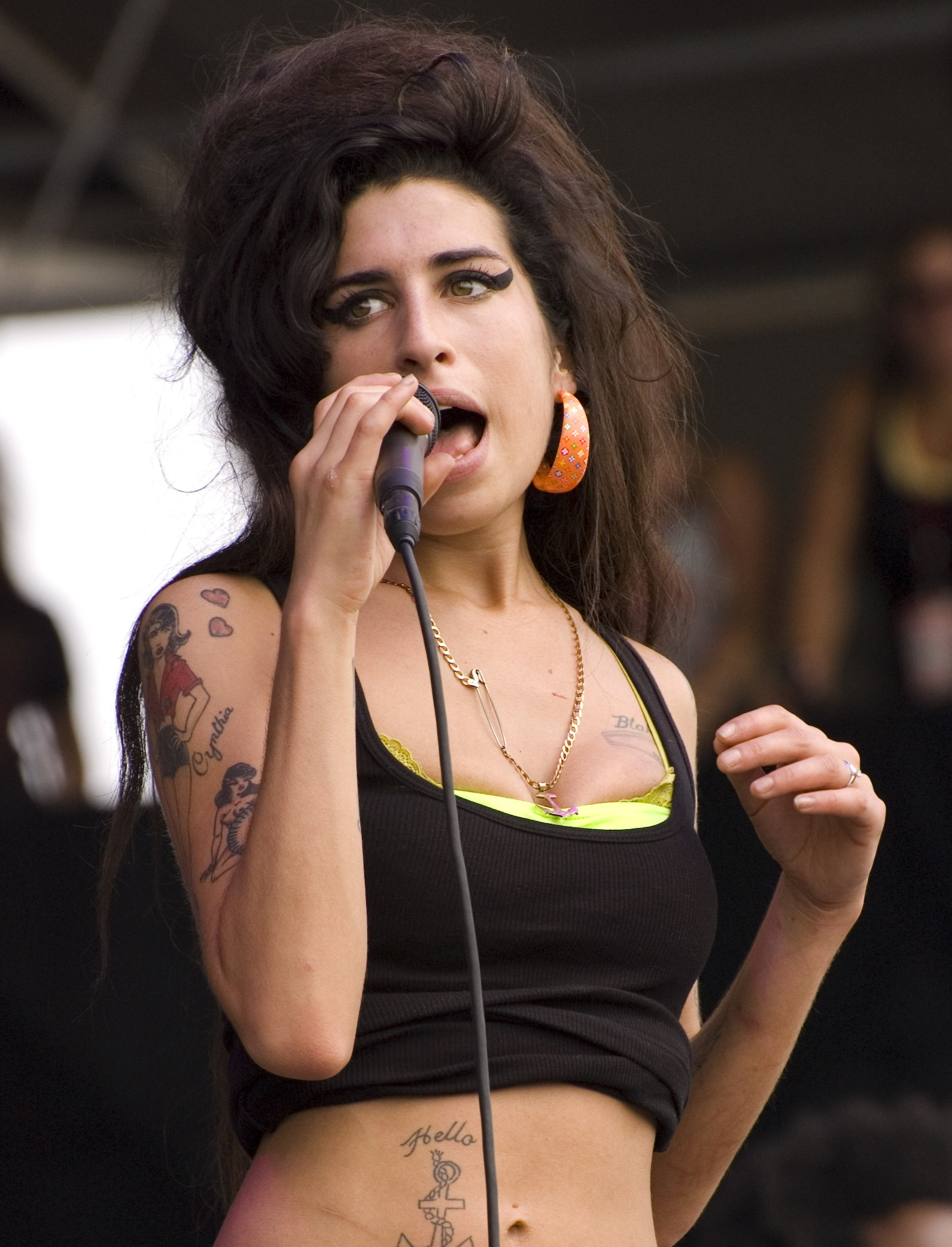
- Winehouse performing at the Virgin Festival in Pimlico, Baltimore, on 4 August 2007
- Studio albums: 2
- Extended plays: 5
- Soundtrack albums: 2
- Live albums: 2
- Compilation albums: 1
- Singles: 15
- Video albums: 3
- Music videos: 14

English singer and songwriter Amy Winehouse released two studio albums, two live albums, one compilation album, five extended plays, 15 singles (including three as a featured artist), three video albums and 14 music videos. Winehouse has sold over 30 million records worldwide, including 1.75 million singles and over 3.98 million albums in the United Kingdom. She has also sold approximately 3.4 million songs and 2.7 million albums in the United States.

Winehouse's debut album, Frank, was released in October 2003 and peaked at number three on the UK Albums Chart. However, none of the four singles released from the album managed to reach the top 50 of the UK Singles Chart. Her second album, Back to Black, was released in October 2006, reaching number one on the UK Albums Chart and number seven on the Billboard 200 in the United States. The album was certified 11-times platinum by the British Phonographic Industry (BPI) and was the best-selling album of 2007 in the UK. The first single from the album, "Rehab", peaked at number seven in the UK and at number nine on the Billboard Hot 100 in the US. The album's second single, "You Know I'm No Good", reached number 18 in the UK. Other singles included the title track, which peaked at number eight in the UK, "Tears Dry on Their Own" and "Love Is a Losing Game". A deluxe edition of the album was released in the UK in November 2007 and also topped the UK chart. By October 2018, Back to Black had sold 3.93 million copies, becoming the 13th best-selling album in the UK. It is also one of the best-selling albums of all time, with over 25 million copies worldwide.

Winehouse collaborated with other artists, as a vocalist on the song "Valerie" on Mark Ronson's solo album, Version. The song peaked at number two in the UK. She also collaborated with former Sugababes member Mutya Buena on "B Boy Baby", the final single from Buena's debut solo album, Real Girl. Winehouse's last studio recording was the song "Body and Soul", a duet with Tony Bennett. The song appears on Winehouse's posthumous compilation album Lioness: Hidden Treasures and Bennett's album Duets II. The critically acclaimed documentary film Amy (2015), which depicts the life of Winehouse, spawned an original soundtrack of the same name that includes Winehouse's well known tracks with previously unheard tracks, rare live sessions, covers and tracks created by film composer Antônio Pinto. It is Winehouse's second and final posthumous compilation album. The soundtrack peaked at number 19 on the UK Albums Chart.

== Albums ==
=== Studio albums ===
List of studio albums, with selected chart positions, sales figures and certifications
Title	Details	Peak chart positions										Sales	Certifications
Title	Details	UK	AUS	AUT	FRA	GER	IRL	NLD	NZ	SWI	US	Sales	Certifications
Frank	Released: 20 October 2003; Label: Island; Formats: CD, LP, digital download	3	23	5	9	9	9	7	22	16	33	UK: 1,000,000 (Note: Sales as of September 2014); US: 315,000 (Note: Sales as of July 2011)	BPI: 4× Platinum; ARIA: Gold; BVMI: Platinum; IFPI AUT: Gold; IFPI SWI: Platinum; RMNZ: Gold
Back to Black	Released: 27 October 2006; Label: Island; Formats: CD, LP, digital download	1	4	1	1	1	1	1	1	1	2	WW: 20,000,000 (Note: Worldwide sales as of July 2015); UK: 4,663,829 (Note: Sales as of October 2026); FRA: 1,140,000 (Note: Sales as of February 2014); US: 3,000,000 (Note: Sales as of January 2015)	BPI: 15× Platinum; ARIA: 6× Platinum; BVMI: 6× Platinum; IFPI AUT: 7× Platinum; IFPI SWI: 7× Platinum; NVPI: 2× Platinum; RIAA: 2× Platinum; RMNZ: 7× Platinum; SNEP: 2× Platinum

=== Live albums ===
List of live albums, with selected chart positions
Title	Details	Peak chart positions							
Title	Details	UK	UK R&B	AUT	FRA	GER	NLD	US R&B/HH	US Sales
Amy Winehouse at the BBC	Released: 19 November 2012; Label: Island, Lioness; Format: 2-CD + DVD set	33	10	12	27	9	41	41	60
Live at Glastonbury 2007	Released: 3 June 2022; Label: Island, UMR; Format: 2-LP	— (Note: Live at Glastonbury 2007 did not enter the UK Albums Chart but peaked at number 18 on the UK Album Sales Chart.)	4	—	129	19	—	—	48
"—" denotes a recording that did not chart or was not released in that territory.

=== Compilation albums ===
List of compilation albums, with selected chart positions, sales figures and certifications
Title	Details	Peak chart positions										Sales	Certifications
Title	Details	UK	AUS	AUT	FRA	GER	IRL	NLD	NZ	SWI	US	Sales	Certifications
Lioness: Hidden Treasures	Released: 2 December 2011; Label: Island, Lioness; Formats: CD, LP, digital download	1	8	1	2	3	4	1	2	1	5	UK: 750,000 (Note: Sales as of July 2012); US: 423,000 (Note: Sales as of July 2012)	BPI: 3× Platinum; ARIA: Platinum; BVMI: Platinum; IFPI AUT: Platinum; IFPI SWI: Platinum; IRMA: 2× Platinum; RMNZ: 2× Platinum

=== Remix albums ===
List of remix albums, with selected chart positions, sales figures and certifications
Title	Details	Peak chart positions				
Title	Details	UK	NLD	US	US R&B	US Dance
Remixes	Released: 17 July 2021; Label: Republic; Formats: 2-LP	94	96	151	15	2

=== Soundtrack albums ===
List of compilation albums, with selected chart positions and certifications
Title	Details	Peak chart positions							Certifications
Title	Details	UK	UK R&B	UK OST	NLD	SWI	US R&B/HH	US OST	Certifications
Amy	Released: 30 October 2015; Label: Island; Formats: CD, LP, digital download	19	4	1	51	57	28	11	BPI: Silver
Back to Black: Songs from the Original Motion Picture	Released: 17 May 2024; Label: Island, UMR; Formats: CD, LP, digital download	—	2	1	—	—	—	—	

=== Box sets ===
List of box sets, with selected chart positions
Title	Details	Peak chart positions							Sales
Title	Details	UK	AUS	FRA	GER	IRL	NZ	SWI	Sales
Frank / Back to Black	Released: 21 November 2008; Label: Island; Formats: 4-CD, digital download	10	18	38	—	48	16	20	UK: 66,469 (Note: Sales as of October 2026)
The Album Collection	Released: 21 September 2012; Label: Island; Format: 3-CD	—	—	109	95	—	—	86	
Amy Winehouse: At the BBC	Released: 19 November 2012; Label: Island, Lioness, UMR; Format: 3-DVD + CD, 3-LP, 3-CD, digital download, streaming	—	—	—	—	—	—	—	
The Collection	Released: 11 December 2015; Label: Island; Format: 8-LP	—	—	—	95	—	—	—	
12×7: The Singles Collection	Released: 20 November 2020; Label: Island, UMR; Format: 12-7″	—	—	—	—	—	—	—	
The Collection	Released: 27 November 2020; Label: Island, UMR; Format: 5-CD	—	—	—	—	—	—	—	
Back To Black (20th Anniversary Edition)	Released: 23 October 2026; Label: Island, UMR; Format: 3-CD, 3-LP, digital download, streaming	—	—	—	—	—	—	—	
"—" denotes a recording that did not chart or was not released in that territory.

== Extended plays ==
List of extended plays, with selected chart positions
Title	Details	Peaks
Title	Details	US
Sessions@AOL	Released: 1 June 2004; Label: Island; Format: Digital download	—
iTunes Festival: London 2007	Released: 13 August 2007; Label: Island; Format: Digital download	—
Back to Black: B-Sides	Released: 15 January 2008; Label: Universal; Format: Digital download	101
Frank (B-Sides)	Released: 13 May 2008; Label: Universal; Format: Digital download	—
I Told You I Was Trouble: Live in London	Released: 5 February 2021; Label: Island, UMR; Format: Digital download	—
"—" denotes a recording that did not chart or was not released in that territory.

== Singles ==
=== As lead artist ===
List of singles as lead artist, with selected chart positions and certifications, showing year released and album name
Title	Year	Peak chart positions										Certifications	Album
Title	Year	UK	AUS	AUT	FRA	GER	IRL	NLD	NZ	SWI	US	Certifications	Album
"Stronger Than Me"	2003	71	—	—	—	—	—	87	—	—	—	BPI: Gold; RMNZ: Gold	Frank
"Take the Box"	2004	57	—	—	—	—	—	—	—	—	—		Frank
"In My Bed" / "You Sent Me Flying"	2004	60	—	—	—	—	—	—	—	—	—		Frank
"Pumps" / "Help Yourself"	2004	65	—	—	—	—	—	—	—	—	—	BPI: Silver	Frank
"Rehab"	2006	7	27	19	11	23	21	13	12	11	9	BPI: 2× Platinum; BVMI: Platinum; IFPI SWI: Platinum; RIAA: Platinum; RMNZ: 3× Platinum	Back to Black
"You Know I'm No Good"	2007	18	89	50	17	71	39	27	—	7	77	BPI: Platinum; BVMI: Gold; IFPI SWI: Platinum; RMNZ: 2× Platinum	Back to Black
"Back to Black"	2007	8	56	3	15	8	11	18	—	8	— (Note: "Back to Black" did not enter the Billboard Hot 100, but peaked at number 55 on the Digital Songs chart.)	BPI: 4× Platinum; BVMI: 3× Gold; IFPI SWI: Platinum; RIAA: Platinum; RMNZ: 3× Platinum	Back to Black
"Tears Dry on Their Own"	2007	16	—	—	87	56	26	100	—	—	—	BPI: 3× Platinum; RMNZ: 2× Platinum	Back to Black
"Love Is a Losing Game"	2007	33	—	—	—	—	33	88	—	—	—	BPI: Platinum; RMNZ: Platinum	Back to Black
"Body and Soul" (with Tony Bennett)	2011	40	97	36	27	31	—	9	—	35	87		Lioness: Hidden Treasures
"Our Day Will Come"	2011	29	—	—	54	—	—	52	—	69	—	BPI: Silver; RMNZ: Gold	Lioness: Hidden Treasures
"—" denotes a recording that did not chart or was not released in that territory.

=== As featured artist ===
List of singles as featured artist, with selected chart positions and certifications, showing year released and album name
Title	Year	Peak chart positions										Certifications	Album
Title	Year	UK	AUT	BEL (FL)	EUR	GER	IRL	NLD	NZ	SCO	SWI	Certifications	Album
"Valerie" (Mark Ronson featuring Amy Winehouse)	2007	2	5	18	11	3	3	1	39	2	4	BPI: 5× Platinum; ARIA: 3× Platinum; BVMI: Platinum; RMNZ: 7× Platinum	Version
"B Boy Baby" (Mutya Buena featuring Amy Winehouse)	2007	73	—	—	—	—	—	—	—	—	—		Real Girl
"Cherry Wine" (Nas featuring Amy Winehouse)	2012	144	—	—	—	—	—	—	—	—	—		Life Is Good
"You're Wondering Now (live)" (The Specials featuring Amy Winehouse)	2019	—	—	—	—	—	—	—	—	—	—		Non-album single (Note: Released for Record Store Day.)
"—" denotes a recording that did not chart or was not released in that territory.

== Other charted and certified songs ==
List of other charted songs, with selected chart positions and certifications, showing year released and album name
Title	Year	Peak chart positions									Certifications	Album
Title	Year	UK	AUS	AUT	GER	IRL	NLD	NZ	SWI	US Bub.	Certifications	Album
"Me & Mr Jones"	2006	—	—	—	—	—	—	—	—	—	BPI: Gold; RMNZ: Gold	Back to Black
"Some Unholy War"	2006	—	—	—	—	—	—	—	—	—	BPI: Silver	Back to Black
"He Can Only Hold Her"	2006	—	—	—	—	—	—	—	—	—	RMNZ: Gold	Back to Black
"Valerie" (solo Live Lounge version)	2006	37	34	35	48	33	4	29	44	—	BPI: Platinum	Back to Black
"Cupid"	—	—	—	—	—	—	—	49	—			Back to Black
"Will You Still Love Me Tomorrow?" (2011)	2011	62	—	—	—	—	—	—	—	3	BPI: Silver; RMNZ: Gold	Lioness: Hidden Treasures
"—" denotes a recording that did not chart or was not released in that territory.

== Guest appearances ==
List of non-single guest appearances, with other performing artists, showing year released and album name
Title	Year	Album
"Get Over It" (JTWR featuring Amy Winehouse)	2004	1xtra & DJ Excalibah Present: We Got Next
"Will You Still Love Me Tomorrow?"	2004	Bridget Jones: The Edge of Reason
"Best for Me" (with Tyler James)	2005	The Unlikely Lad
"To Know Him Is to Love Him"	2007	The Saturday Sessions: The Dermot O'Leary Show
"I Saw Mummy Kissing Santa Claus" (live)	2008	The Best of Christmas
"It's My Party" (Quincy Jones featuring Amy Winehouse)	2010	Q: Soul Bossa Nostra
"Find My Love" (Salaam Remi featuring Nas and Amy Winehouse)	2019	Do It for the Culture 2
"So Strange" (Kristian Marr featuring Amy Winehouse)	2020	So Strange

== Videography ==
=== Video albums ===
Title	Details	Notes
Sympatico MSN Presents Amy Winehouse Live @ The Orange Lounge	Recorded: 11 May 2007; Released: 23 October 2007; Label: Universal Republic; Format: DVD	Unplugged, in-studio performances of "Back to Black", "Rehab", "You Know I'm No Good" and "Love Is a Losing Game"; Accompanied by guitarist Binky Griptite of Sharon Jones & The Dap-Kings; Recorded at the Orange Lounge Recording Studio in Toronto; Included as a bonus DVD on the Best Buy exclusive deluxe edition of Back to Black
I Told You I Was Trouble: Live in London	Recorded: 9 March 2007; Released: 5 November 2007; Label: Island; Formats: DVD, Blu-ray, LP, CD	Live concert recorded at the Shepherd's Bush Empire in London; Also includes a documentary focusing on her rise to fame
In Concert 2007	Recorded: 29 June 2007; Released: 30 August 2011; Label: Immortal; Format: DVD	Live concert recorded at the Eurockéennes festival in Belfort, France

=== Music videos ===
List of music videos, showing year released and directors
Title	Year	Director(s)
"Stronger Than Me"	2003	Enrico Zanetti
"Take the Box"	2004	Kyle Eaton
"In My Bed"	2004	Paul Gore
"Fuck Me Pumps"	2004	Marlene Rhein
"Rehab"	2006	Phil Griffin
"You Know I'm No Good"	2007	Phil Griffin
"Back to Black"	2007	Phil Griffin
"Tears Dry on Their Own"	2007	David LaChapelle
"Love Is a Losing Game" (montage version)	2007	Unknown
"Love Is a Losing Game" (live version)	2007	Unknown
"Valerie" (Mark Ronson and the Winettes)	2007	Robert Hales
"Just Friends"	2008	Anthony Mathile and Robert Semmer
"Body and Soul" (with Tony Bennett)	2011	Unjoo Moon
"Our Day Will Come"	2011	Unknown
"Cherry Wine"	2012	Jay Martin
