= List of awards and nominations received by Amy Winehouse =

Amy Winehouse awards and nominations
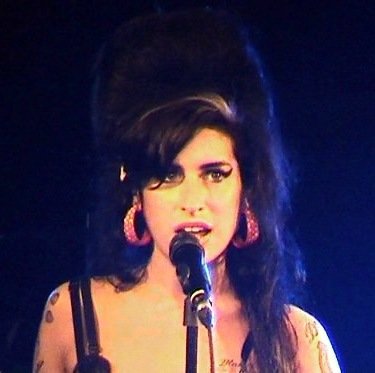
- Winehouse performing in Berlin in 2007
Awards & Nominations
Award	Won	Nominated
BRIT Awards	1	8
ECHO Awards	2	3
Elle Style Awards	1	1
Grammy Awards	6	8
Ivor Novello Awards	3	5
Mercury Prize	0	2
Meteor Music Awards	1	1
MOBO Awards	1	6
MOJO Awards	1	3
MTV Europe Music Awards	1	4
MTV Video Music Awards	0	3
mtvU Woodie Awards	0	1
NME Awards	2	6
NRJ Music Awards	0	2
Popjustice £20 Music Prize	1	1
Premios 40 Principales	0	1
Q Awards	1	1
Teen Choice Awards	0	1
Urban Music Awards	1	2
Vibe Awards	0	1
Vodafone Live Music Awards	1	2
World Music Awards	1	3
- Total number of wins and nominations
Totals	29	76
- Footnotes

Amy Winehouse was an English singer-songwriter. She was best known for her eclectic mix of various musical genres, including soul, jazz, rock and roll and R&B. Winehouse released two albums of original music: Frank (2003) and Back to Black (2006). Frank was originally released by Island Records in October 2003 in the United Kingdom and in November 2007 in the United States. Because of the success of her second album, Frank was later re-issued in the UK in May 2008 and in the US in June 2008. Back to Black was issued under Island Records in Europe, Asia, South America and Australia, and under Universal Republic in the US. Several of Winehouse' singles have charted worldwide, including "Rehab", "You Know I'm No Good", "Back to Black", "Tears Dry on Their Own", and "Valerie".

Overall, Winehouse received 29 awards from 76 nominations. Her debut album earned several awards and recognitions, including an Ivor Novello Award for Best Contemporary Song ("Stronger Than Me"), a BRIT Award nomination for Best Female Solo Artist, and an inclusion in Robert Dimery's 2006 book, 1001 Albums You Must Hear Before You Die. Back to Black produced numerous nominations, including two from the BRIT Awards (Best Female Solo Artist and Best British Album), six from the Grammy Awards, four from the Ivor Novello Awards, four from the MTV Europe Music Awards, three from the MTV Video Music Awards, one from the Southbank Awards (Best British Female Artist), three from the World Music Awards, and one each from the Mercury Prize (Album of the Year) and MOBO Awards (Best UK Female). In 2025, Back to Black was selected for preservation in the National Recording Registry by the Library of Congress for being "culturally, historically, or aesthetically significant".

== BRIT Awards ==
The BRIT Awards are the British Phonographic Industry's (BPI) annual pop music awards. Winehouse received one award from eight nominations and two that are posthumous.

Year	Nominated work	Award	Result	Ref.
2004	Amy Winehouse	British Urban Act	Nominated	
2004	Amy Winehouse	British Female Solo Artist	Nominated	
2005	Amy Winehouse	British Female Solo Artist	Nominated	
2007	Amy Winehouse	British Female Solo Artist	Won	
2007	Back to Black	British Album of the Year	Nominated	
2008	"Valerie" (with Mark Ronson)	British Single of the Year	Nominated	
2013	Amy Winehouse	British Female Solo Artist	Nominated	
2016	Amy Winehouse	British Female Solo Artist	Nominated	

== Echo Music Awards ==
The Echo Music Awards are granted every year in Germany by the Deutsche Phono-Akademie (an association of recording companies). The Echo Award is the successor to the Deutscher Schallplattenpreis (German Record Award). Each year's winner is determined by the previous year's sales. The winners in the pop category are announced in March, the winners in the classical category in October. Winehouse won two awards from three nominations. In 2012, Winehouse, alongside fellow singer Whitney Houston, was posthumously inducted into the ECHO Hall of Fame.

Year	Nominated work	Award	Result	Ref.
2008	Amy Winehouse	Best International Female Artist – Rock/Pop	Nominated	
2009	Amy Winehouse	Best International Female Artist – Rock/Pop	Won	
2009	Back to Black	Album of the Year	Won	
2012	Amy Winehouse	ECHO Hall of Fame	Inducted	

== Elle Style Awards ==
The Elle Style Awards is an awards ceremony hosted annually by French magazine Elle to honour achievement in the fields of style, design, and entertainment. Winehouse received one award from one nomination.

Year	Nominated work	Award	Result	Ref.
2007	Amy Winehouse	Best British Music Act	Won	

== GAFFA Awards ==
=== GAFFA Awards (Denmark) ===
Delivered since 1991, the GAFFA Awards are a Danish award that rewards popular music by the magazine of the same name.

Year	Nominee / work	Award	Result	Ref.
2007	Herself	Best Foreign Female Act	Won	
2007	Herself	Best Foreign New Act	Nominated	
2007	"Rehab"	Best Foreign Song	Nominated	

== Grammy Awards ==
The Grammy Awards are awarded annually by the National Academy of Recording Arts and Sciences of the United States for outstanding achievements in the record industry. Often considered the highest music honour, the awards were established in 1958. Winehouse received six awards from eight nominations, the last of which was received posthumously. Although the documentary Amy (2015) won Best Music Film at the 2016 Grammy Awards, it is credited to the director Asif Kapadia and the producer James Gay-Rees.

Year	Nominated work	Award	Result	Ref.
2008	Amy Winehouse	Best New Artist	Won	
2008	Back to Black	Album of the Year	Nominated	
2008	Back to Black	Best Pop Vocal Album	Won	
2008	"Rehab"	Record of the Year	Won	
2008	"Rehab"	Song of the Year	Won	
2008	"Rehab"	Best Female Pop Vocal Performance	Won	
2012	"Body and Soul" (with Tony Bennett)	Best Pop Duo/Group Performance	Won	
2013	"Cherry Wine" (with Nas)	Best Rap/Sung Collaboration	Nominated	

== Guinness World Records ==
The Guinness World Records is a British book published annually, which recognizes world records both of human achievements and the extremes of the natural world. Winehouse has broken one record.

Year	Record	Record holder
2009	Most Grammy Awards Won by a British Female Act	Amy Winehouse

== Ivor Novello Awards ==
The Ivor Novello Awards, named after the Cardiff-born entertainer Ivor Novello, are British awards for songwriting and composing. The "Ivors" are presented annually in London by the British Academy of Composers and Songwriters, and were first introduced in 1955. Ceremonies take place each May and are sponsored by PRS for Music (previously The Performing Right Society). They are respected worldwide as the major platform for recognizing and rewarding Britain's songwriting and composing talents. The Award itself is a solid bronze sculpture of Euterpe – the muse of lyric poetry. Winehouse received three awards from five nominations.

Year	Nominated work	Award	Result	Ref.
2004	"Stronger Than Me"	Best Contemporary Song Musically & Lyrically	Won	
2007	"Rehab"	Best Contemporary Song	Won	
2008	"You Know I'm No Good"	Best Song Musically and Lyrically	Nominated	
2008	"Love Is a Losing Game"	Best Song Musically and Lyrically	Won	
2008	"Rehab"	Best Selling Song	Nominated	

== Mercury Prize ==
The Mercury Prize, formerly the Mercury Music Prize and currently known as the Nationwide Mercury Prize for sponsorship reasons, is an annual music prize awarded for the best album from the United Kingdom or Ireland. It was established by BPI and BARD (the British Association of Record Dealers) in 1992 as an alternative to the industry-dominated BRIT Awards. The awards usually take place in September, but nominated albums are announced in July. Nominations are chosen by a selected panel of musicians, music executives, journalists and other figures in the music industry in the UK and Ireland. Winehouse received two nominations.

Year	Nominated work	Award	Result	Ref.
2004	Frank	Album of the Year	Nominated	
2007	Back to Black	Album of the Year	Nominated	

== Meteor Music Awards ==
The Meteor Music Awards are the national music awards of Ireland, held every year since 2001 and promoted by MCD Productions. Winehouse received one award from one nomination.

Year	Nominated work	Award	Result	Ref.
2008	Amy Winehouse	Best International Female	Won	

== MOBO Awards ==
The MOBO Awards (MOBO being an acronym for Music of Black Origin), established in 1995 by Kanya King MBE and Andy Ruffell (former BMX Superstar and DanceStar Awards founder who left after the show peaked in 2001), are held annually in the United Kingdom to recognize artists of any race or nationality performing black music. Winehouse received one award from six nominations.

Year	Nominated work	Award	Result	Ref.
2004	Amy Winehouse	Best Jazz Act	Nominated	
2004	Amy Winehouse	UK Act of the Year	Nominated	
2007	Amy Winehouse	Best UK Female	Won	
2007	Amy Winehouse	Best R&B	Nominated	
2007	"Rehab"	Best Song	Nominated	
2007	"Back to Black"	Best Video	Nominated	

== MOJO Awards ==
MOJO Awards are awarded by the popular British music magazine, Mojo, published monthly by Bauer. Winehouse received one award from three nominations.

Year	Nominated work	Award	Result	Ref.
2007	Amy Winehouse	Best New Act	Nominated	
2007	Back to Black	Album of the Year	Nominated	
2007	"Rehab"	Song of the Year	Won	

== MTV Europe Music Awards ==
The MTV Europe Music Awards were established in 1994 by MTV Networks Europe to celebrate the most popular music videos in Europe. Originally an alternative to the American MTV Video Music Awards, the MTV Europe Music Awards is today a popular celebration of what MTV viewers consider the best in music. Most of the awards are voted for by the viewers. The awards are presented annually and broadcast live on MTV Europe, MTV and most of the international MTV channels as well as online. Winehouse received one award from four nominations.

Year	Nominated work	Award	Result	Ref.
2007	Back to Black	Album of the Year	Nominated	
2007	"Rehab"	Most Addictive Track	Nominated	
2007	Amy Winehouse	Artist's Choice	Won	
2008	Amy Winehouse	Act of the Year	Nominated	

== MTV Video Music Awards ==
The American MTV Video Music Awards were established in the end of the summer of 1984 by MTV to celebrate the top music videos of the year. Originally beginning as an alternative to the Grammy Awards, the MTV Video Music Awards is now a respected pop culture awards show in its own right. Normally known as the Best Female Video category, in 2007 the title was briefly changed to Female Artist of the Year. Winehouse received three nominations.

Year	Nominated work	Award	Result	Ref.
2007	Amy Winehouse	Female Artist of the Year	Nominated	
2007	Amy Winehouse	Best New Artist	Nominated	
2007	"Rehab"	Video of the Year	Nominated	

== MTV Video Music Brazil ==
The MTV Video Music Brazil (VMB) was established by MTV Brasil in 1995. Amy Winehouse has received from two nominations.

Year	Nominee / work	Award	Result
2007	Amy Winehouse	International Artist	Nominated
2008	Amy Winehouse	International Artist	Nominated

== mtvU Woodie Awards ==
mtvU is a division of MTV Networks that broadcasts a 24-hour television channel that is available on more than 750 college and university campuses across the United States. A Viacom-owned channel, mtvU provides an alternative to standard music television for college students, and gives advertisers and music promotion companies access to college-age viewers, a valuable but traditionally difficult-to-reach demographic group. mtvU also has its own annual awards show, the mtvU Woodie Awards, where winners are determined by online voting. Winehouse was nominated once.

Year	Nominated work	Award	Result	Ref.
2007	Amy Winehouse	Woodie of the Year	Nominated	

== National Recording Registry ==
The American National Recording Registry was established by the Library of Congress in 2000 to preserve sound recordings that are culturally important. Winehouse has one work inducted.

Year	Nominated work	Award	Result	Ref.
2025	Back to Black	Preservation for being "culturally, historically, or aesthetically significant"	Inducted	

== NME Awards ==
The NME Awards is an annual music awards show founded by the British music magazine NME. Winehouse received two awards from six nominations.

Year	Nominated work	Award	Result	Ref.
2008	Amy Winehouse	Best Solo Artist	Nominated	
2008	Amy Winehouse	Villain of the Year	Nominated	
2008	Amy Winehouse	Worst Dressed Performer	Won	
2008	I Told You I Was Trouble: Live in London	Best Music DVD	Nominated	
2009	Amy Winehouse	Villain of the Year	Nominated	
2009	Amy Winehouse	Worst Dressed	Won	

== NRJ Music Awards ==
Winehouse was nominated twice.

Year	Nominated work	Award	Result	Ref.
2008	Amy Winehouse	International Revelation of the Year	Nominated	
2008	Back to Black	International Album of the Year	Nominated	

== Popjustice £20 Music Prize ==
The Popjustice £20 Music Prize is an annual prize awarded by a panel of judges organized by UK music website Popjustice to the singer(s) of the best British pop single of the past year. To qualify, a single must be by (a) British artist(s) and have been released within the 12 months before the award nominations in July. Winehouse received one award from one nomination.

Year	Nominated work	Award	Result	Ref.
2007	"Rehab"	Best British Pop Single of the Year	Won	

== Premios 40 Principales ==
Premios 40 Principales is an awards ceremony hosted annually by the Spanish radio channel Los 40 Principales. Winehouse was nominated once.

Year	Nominee / work	Award	Result
2008	Amy Winehouse	Best Non-Spanish International Artist	Nominated
2008	Rehab	Best Non-Spanish International Song	Nominated

== Q Awards ==
The Q Awards are the UK's annual music awards run by the music magazine Q to honour musical excellence. Winners are voted by readers of Q online, with others decided by a judging panel. Winehouse received one award from one nomination.

Year	Nominated work	Award	Result	Ref.
2007	Back to Black	Best Album	Won	

== Teen Choice Awards ==
The Teen Choice Awards is an American awards show presented annually by Fox. The programme honours the year's biggest achievements in music, movies, sports, and television, as voted on by teenagers aged 13–19. The programme usually features a high number of celebrities and musical performers. Winehouse was nominated once.

Year	Nominated work	Award	Result	Ref.
2007	Amy Winehouse	Breakout Female Artist	Nominated	

== Soul Train Music Awards ==
The Soul Train Music Awards is an American annual music awards ceremony launched in 1987 to honour the best in African-American culture, music and entertainment. Winehouse was nominated once.

Year	Nominated work	Award	Result	Ref.
2012	Our Day Will Come	Best International Performance	Nominated	

== Urban Music Awards ==
The Urban Music Awards is a British awards ceremony launched in 2003 to recognize the achievement of urban-based artists, producers, nightclubs, DJ's, radio stations, and record labels. Winehouse received one award from two nominations.

Year	Nominated work	Award	Result	Ref.
2008	Amy Winehouse	Best Neo-Soul Act	Won	
2009	Amy Winehouse	Best Female	Nominated	

== Vibe Awards ==
The Vibe Awards are sponsored annually by Vibe, an American monthly magazine launched in 1993 by founder Quincy Jones and funded by Time Inc. The publication predominantly features R&B and hip-hop music artists, actors, and other entertainers. Winehouse was nominated once.

Year	Nominated work	Award	Result	Ref.
2007	Amy Winehouse	Breakthrough Artist of the Year	Nominated	

== Virgin Media Music Awards ==
Winehouse received two awards from two nominations.

Year	Nominated work	Award	Result	Ref.
2007	Amy Winehouse	Disaster of the Year	Won	
2008	Amy Winehouse	Loser of the Year	Won	

== Vodafone Live Music Awards ==
The Vodafone Live Music Awards are awarded annually by British mobile telecommunications company Vodafone to celebrate live music. Winehouse received one award from two nominations.

Year	Nominated work	Award	Result	Ref.
2007	Amy Winehouse	Best Female	Won	
2008	Amy Winehouse	Best Female	Nominated	

== World Music Awards ==
The World Music Awards, founded in 1989, is an international awards show that annually honours recording artists based on their worldwide sales figures, which are provided by the International Federation of the Phonographic Industry (IFPI). Winehouse received one award from three nominations.

Year	Nominated work	Award	Result	Ref.
2007	Amy Winehouse	World's Best-Selling New Artist	Nominated	
2007	Amy Winehouse	World's Best-Selling Pop/Rock Female Artist	Nominated	
2008	Amy Winehouse	Best Selling Pop/Rock Female	Won	
