= Amy Winehouse at the BBC =

Live album by Amy Winehouse
- Released: 12 November 2012
- Recorded: November 2003; (The Stables); 11 July 2004; (T in the Park); 15 August 2004; (Leicester Summer Sundae); 2006; (Pete Mitchell); 3 November 2006; (Jools Holland); 10 January 2007; (Jo Whiley Live Lounge); 2009; (Big Band Special)
- Genres: R&B; neo soul; jazz; soul
- Length: 48:25
- Label: Universal

Amy Winehouse chronology
Lioness: Hidden Treasures (2011)	Amy Winehouse at the BBC (2012)	Amy (2015)

Amy Winehouse at the BBC is a posthumous live album by the English singer and songwriter Amy Winehouse. It was released on 12 November 2012 by Universal Music Group. The album, along with Winehouse's previous record Lioness: Hidden Treasures, was released in aid of the Amy Winehouse Foundation. It features live songs performed by Winehouse at BBC specials during 2004 to 2009.

The album was re-issued on vinyl and CD and added to digital retailers and streaming platforms on 7 May 2021. The new collection consists of the original album, as well as A Tribute to Amy Winehouse by Jools Holland and Amy Winehouse – BBC One Sessions Live at Porchester Hall. The latter two were previously included as DVDs in the original deluxe box set, but were made available in audio form for the first time.

== Reception ==
Professional ratings
Aggregate scores
Source	Rating
Metacritic	64/100
Review scores
Source	Rating
AllMusic	4/5 stars
BBC	Favourable
The Independent	3/5 stars
NME	6/10 stars
Pitchfork Media	3.1/10
San Francisco Chronicle	Favourable

The album was released to moderately positive critical reviews, with aggregator Metacritic assigning a positive review score of 64%, indicating generally favourable reception. Gary Mulholland of the BBC wrote that the set "stands as an alternative Best Of, showcasing her skills as a live performer."

== Track listing ==
No.	Title	Writer(s)	Length
1.	"Know You Now" (Leicester Summer Sundae 2004)	Amy Winehouse; Gordon Williams; Earl Chinna Smith; Delroy "Chris" Cooper; Astor Campbell; Donovan Jackson	3:55
2.	"Fuck Me Pumps" (T in the Park 2004)	Winehouse; Salaam Remi	3:41
3.	"In My Bed" (T in the Park 2004)	Winehouse; Remi	4:37
4.	"October Song" (T in the Park 2004)	Winehouse; Matt Rowe; Stefan Skarbek	3:41
5.	"Rehab" (Pete Mitchell 2006)	Winehouse	3:58
6.	"You Know I'm No Good" (Jo Whiley Live Lounge 2007)	Winehouse	3:26
7.	"Just Friends" (Big Band Special 2009)	Winehouse	3:17
8.	"Love Is a Losing Game" (Jools Holland 2009)	Winehouse	2:49
9.	"Tears Dry on Their Own" (Jo Whiley Live Lounge 2007)	Winehouse; Nickolas Ashford; Valerie Simpson	3:11
10.	"Best Friends, Right?" (Leicester Summer Sundae 2004)	Winehouse	3:03
11.	"I Should Care" (The Stables 2004)	Sammy Cahn; Axel Stordahl; Paul Weston	3:39
12.	"Lullaby of Birdland" (The Stables 2004)	B Y Foster; George Shearing	2:34
13.	"Valerie" (Jo Whiley Live Lounge 2007)	Sean Payne; Dave McCabe; Abi Harding; Boyan Chowdhury; Russell Pritchard	3:51
14.	"To Know Him Is to Love Him" (Pete Mitchell 2006)	Phil Spector	2:33

=== Deluxe box set ===
In addition to the live album, a box set was released on 19 November 2012. It features the album along with three extra DVDs: Arena: Amy Winehouse – The Day She Came to Dingle (which is also featured in the two-disc version of the album), A Tribute to Amy Winehouse by Jools Holland and Amy Winehouse – BBC One Sessions Live at Porchester Hall.

== Charts and certifications ==
=== Weekly charts ===
Chart (2012–13)	Peak position
US Top R&B/Hip-Hop Albums (Billboard)	41

Chart (2021–22)	Peak position
Austrian Albums (Ö3 Austria)	12
Belgian Albums (Ultratop Flanders)	12
Belgian Albums (Ultratop Wallonia)	16
French Albums (SNEP)	27
German Albums (Offizielle Top 100)	9
Italian Albums (FIMI)	76
Polish Albums (ZPAV)	41
Portuguese Albums (AFP)	39
Scottish Albums (Official Charts)	10
Swiss Albums (Schweizer Hitparade)	12
UK Albums (Official Charts)	33
UK R&B Albums (Official Charts)	1
US Top Album Sales (Billboard)	60
US Tastemakers (Billboard)	8

Chart (2024–2026)	Peak position
Greek Albums (IFPI)	11

=== Certifications ===
Region	Certification
Brazil	Gold

== Release history ==
Region	Date	Formats	Label
United States	13 November 2012	CD	Universal Republic
United Kingdom	19 November 2012	CD	Island
United Kingdom	19 November 2012	CD · DVD set	Island
Worldwide	7 May 2021	3-CD · 3-LP · digital download	Universal Music Group
