= Back to Black (soundtrack) =

2024 soundtrack albums

Back to Black (Songs from the Original Motion Picture)

Soundtrack album by Amy Winehouse and various artists
- Released: 12 April 2024
- Length: 40:13 (standard); 86:34 (extended)
- Label: Island
- Producer: Giles Martin

Amy Winehouse chronology
Amy (2015)	Back to Black (Songs from the Original Motion Picture) (2024)

Back to Black (Songs from the Original Motion Picture) is the soundtrack to the 2024 biographical film of the same name. It was released on 12 April 2024 under the Island Records label in two editions—the standard edition featuring 12 tracks and an extended edition consisting of 26 tracks. The album primarily featured original recordings by Amy Winehouse and other vocal performances from artists The Shangri-Las, Billie Holiday, Minnie Riperton, Sarah Vaughan, Dinah Washington, Thelonious Monk, The Specials, Little Anthony and the Imperials, Donny Hathaway, The Libertines, Tony Bennett and Willie Nelson. Another album consisting of the score composed by Nick Cave and Warren Ellis was also released on the same day as the film's theatrical release in the United Kingdom.

== Background ==
The soundtrack was curated with the licensing from The Amy Winehouse Estate along with the music publishing companies Universal Music Group and Sony Music Publishing. Most of the songs in the film were performed by Marisa Abela who plays Winehouse; the soundtrack, however, featured original recordings from Winehouse along with contributions from other artists. Giles Martin served as the music producer.

Cave and Ellis also composed "Song for Amy" which was included in the soundtrack. Cave also performed and arranged the song, which used piano and strings. Taylor-Johnson described the song, saying "I watched him sit at the piano and just sort of conjure up this incredible song, which is now at the end of the film. He sings it with such raw purity. It's so incredibly moving."

== Release ==
The soundtrack was announced on 20 March 2024 by Universal Music Group-owned Island Records which had published and licensed most of Winehouse's albums and singles. The soundtrack which had a 12-track standard edition and a 26-track extended edition was made available for pre-order on the same day. Both editions were released on 12 April 2024 through music streaming services and compact discs, with a vinyl edition set to be released on 17 May 2024.

== Track listing ==
Back to Black (Songs from the Original Motion Picture) – standard edition track listing
No.	Title	Artist(s)	Length
1.	"What Is It About Men"	Amy Winehouse	3:31
2.	"Stronger Than Me"	Winehouse	3:35
3.	"Know You Now"	Winehouse	3:03
4.	"Leader of the Pack"	The Shangri-Las	2:51
5.	"All of Me"	Billie Holiday	3:02
6.	"Back to Black"	Winehouse	4:01
7.	"Les Fleurs"	Minnie Riperton	3:17
8.	"Mad About the Boy"	Dinah Washington	3:01
9.	"Love Is a Losing Game"	Winehouse	2:35
10.	"Embraceable You"	Sarah Vaughan featuring Clifford Brown	4:50
11.	"Tears Dry on Their Own"	Winehouse	3:06
12.	"Song for Amy"	Nick Cave; Warren Ellis	3:21
Total length:			40:13

Back to Black (Songs from the Original Motion Picture) – extended edition track listing
No.	Title	Artist(s)	Length
1.	"Straight No Chaser"	Thelonious Monk	2:55
2.	"What Is It About Men"	Winehouse	3:30
3.	"Stronger Than Me"	Winehouse	3:35
4.	"I Heard Love Is Blind"	Winehouse	2:10
5.	"Ghost Town"	The Specials	3:39
6.	"Know You Now"	Winehouse	3:03
7.	"I'm on the Outside (Looking In)"	Little Anthony and the Imperials	3:12
8.	"Leader of the Pack"	The Shangri-Las	2:51
9.	"All of Me"	Holiday	3:02
10.	"Dressed in Black"	The Shangri-Las	2:54
11.	"I Love You More Than You'll Ever Know"	Donny Hathaway	5:23
12.	"Don't Look Back into the Sun"	The Libertines	3:00
13.	"Fuck Me Pumps"	Winehouse	3:21
14.	"Body and Soul"	Tony Bennett	4:00
15.	"Back to Black"	Winehouse	4:01
16.	"Valerie" (Live At BBC Radio 1 Live Lounge, London) (2007)	Winehouse	3:52
17.	"Les Fleurs"	Riperton	3:17
18.	"That's Life"	Willie Nelson	3:39
19.	"Mad About the Boy"	Washington	3:01
20.	"(There Is) No Greater Love"	Winehouse	2:09
21.	"Me & Mr Jones"	Winehouse	2:33
22.	"Love Is a Losing Game"	Winehouse	2:35
23.	"Rehab"	Winehouse	3:35
24.	"Embraceable You"	Vaughan featuring Brown	4:50
25.	"Tears Dry on Their Own"	Winehouse	3:06
26.	"Song for Amy"	Cave; Ellis	3:21
Total length:			86:34

== Release history ==
Release dates and formats for Back to Black (Songs from the Original Motion Picture)
Region	Date	Format(s)	Label	Ref.
Various	April 12, 2024	Digital download; streaming	Island	
Various	May 17, 2024	CD; Vinyl	Island	

== Original score ==
Back to Black (Original Motion Picture Score)

Film score by Nick Cave and Warren Ellis
- Released: 12 April 2024
- Recorded: 2023–2024
- Genre: Film score
- Length: 24:40
- Label: Back Lot Music
- Producer: Nick Cave; Warren Ellis; Giles Martin

Back to Black marked Cave and Ellis' maiden cinematic collaboration with Sam Taylor-Johnson; the duo had previously worked with the director on contributing the text for Still Lives (2015). According to Taylor-Johnson, "their sensibility as well as understanding of this story has led to a profoundly deep and moving film score". Cave and Ellis underscored around 20 minutes of the film's music for the film. The score album was released by Back Lot Music on 12 April 2024.

Back to Black (Original Motion Picture Score)
No.	Title	Length
1.	"Opening"	1:02
2.	"At the Taxi"	1:57
3.	"Park Bench"	0:52
4.	"Tattoo Parlour"	1:29
5.	"Dublin Castle"	1:22
6.	"Snooker Hall"	2:07
7.	"Sort Yourselves Out"	1:20
8.	"Soho to Glastonbury"	4:18
9.	"Holloway Prison"	2:40
10.	"The End"	2:02
11.	"Song For Amy"	3:20
12.	"Song for Amy" (Reprise)	2:13
Total length:		24:40

=== Reception ===
Anna Smith of Rolling Stone UK wrote that the score "enhances the feeling of intimacy with its impressionable young protagonist". Damon Wise of Deadline Hollywood described it as "surprisingly unobtrusive". Jonathan Romney of Screen International wrote "Nick Cave and Warren Ellis offer an uncharacteristically unobtrusive and conventional score, although there is the bonus of a sombre, lushly orchestrated new ballad that Cave sings over the end credits." Roger Graham of Little White Lies wrote "Nick Cave and Warren Ellis' score adds an aggravating wistfulness".

== Charts ==
Chart performance for Back to Black (Songs from the Original Motion Picture)
Chart (2024)	Peak position
Austrian Albums (Ö3 Austria)	51
Belgian Albums (Ultratop Flanders)	81
Croatian International Albums (HDU)	16
Portuguese Albums (AFP)	63
Swiss Albums (Schweizer Hitparade)	24
UK Compilation Albums (OCC)	18
UK R&B Albums (OCC)	2
UK Soundtrack Albums (OCC)	1
