= I Told You I Was Trouble: Live in London =

Video by Amy Winehouse
- Released: 5 November 2007
- Recorded: 29 May 2007
- Venue: Shepherd's Bush Empire, London
- Genre: Soul; R&B; jazz
- Length: 93 minutes
- Label: Island
- Director: Hamish Hamilton
- Producer: Melanie Vaughton

Amy Winehouse chronology
Back to Black (2006)	I Told You I Was Trouble: Live in London (2007)	Lioness: Hidden Treasures (2011)

I Told You I Was Trouble: Live in London is a live concert video by the English singer and songwriter Amy Winehouse, released on DVD and Blu-ray on 5 November 2007 by Island Records. It was filmed on 29 May 2007 at The Shepherd's Bush Empire in London. On 11 December 2015, the album was released on vinyl as part of an eight-disc, limited-edition vinyl box set titled The Collection. The title comes from a line in the song "You Know I'm No Good".

== Track listing ==
1. Intro/"Addicted"
2. "Just Friends"
3. "Cherry"
4. "Back to Black"
5. "Wake Up Alone"
6. "Tears Dry on Their Own"
7. "He Can Only Hold Her"/"Doo Wop (That Thing)"
8. "Fuck Me Pumps"
9. "Some Unholy War"
10. "Love Is a Losing Game"
11. "Valerie"
12. "Hey Little Rich Girl" (featuring Zalon & Ade)
13. "Rehab"
14. "You Know I'm No Good"
15. "Me & Mr. Jones"
16. "Monkey Man"
17. Outro

I Told You I Was Trouble documentary

1. "The Early Years"
2. "Life in the U.K."
3. "The U.S. Story"
4. "Back Home ... The Future"

== Personnel ==
Credits adapted from the liner notes of I Told You I Was Trouble: Live in London.

=== Musicians ===
- Amy Winehouse – vocals
- Dale Davis – musical direction, bass
- Zalon Thompson – background vocals
- Ade Omotayo – background vocals
- Robin Banerjee – guitar
- Nathan Alan – drums
- Xantoné Blacq – keys
- Henry Collins – trumpet
- James Hunt – alto saxophone
- Frank Walden – baritone saxophone

=== Technical ===
- Mike Mooney – executive production
- Ray Still – executive production
- Julie Jakobed – executive production
- Melanie Vaughton – production
- Hamish Hamilton – direction

=== Documentary ===
- John Turner – editing
- Mike Mooney – executive production
- Joe Kane – production

=== Artwork ===
- Chris Christoforou – cover photography, inlay photography
- Jack Barnes – inlay photography
- Alex Hutchinson – design

== Charts ==
=== Weekly charts ===
Chart (2007–2009)	Peak position
Belgian Music DVD (Ultratop Flanders)	3
Belgian Music DVD (Ultratop Wallonia)	7
Brazilian Music DVD (ABPD)	8
Danish Music DVD (Hitlisten)	3
Dutch Music DVD (MegaCharts)	1
German Albums (Offizielle Top 100)	95
New Zealand Music DVD (RIANZ)	3
Portuguese Music DVD (AFP)	4
Spanish Music DVD (PROMUSICAE)	2
Swiss Music DVD (Schweizer Hitparade)	3

Chart (2011)	Peak position
Australian Music DVD (ARIA)	12
Austrian Music DVD (Ö3 Austria)	2
Czech Music DVD (ČNS IFPI)	10
French Music DVD (SNEP)	1
Hungarian Music DVD (MAHASZ)	4
Irish Music DVD (IRMA)	2
Italian Music DVD (FIMI)	1
Swedish Music DVD (Sverigetopplistan)	3
UK Music Videos (OCC)	3
US Music Video Sales (Billboard)	7

=== Year-end charts ===
Chart (2007)	Position
Dutch Music DVD (MegaCharts)	43

Chart (2008)	Position
Belgian Music DVD (Ultratop Flanders)	22
Belgian Music DVD (Ultratop Wallonia)	38
Dutch Music DVD (MegaCharts)	11
French Music DVD (SNEP)	18
Spanish Music DVD (PROMUSICAE)	9

Chart (2011)	Position
French Music DVD (SNEP)	20
Italian Music DVD (FIMI)	4
Swedish Music DVD (Sverigetopplistan)	75

Chart (2012)	Position
French Music DVD (SNEP)	35

Chart (2015)	Position
Italian Music DVD (FIMI)	15

== Certifications ==
Region	Certification	Certified units/sales
Argentina (CAPIF)	2× Platinum	16,000^{^}
Australia (ARIA)	Gold	7,500^{^}
Austria (IFPI Austria)	Gold	5,000^{*}
Brazil (Pro-Música Brasil)	Diamond	125,000^{*}
France (SNEP)	Gold	5,000^{*}
Germany (BVMI)	Platinum	50,000^{^}
New Zealand (RMNZ)	Gold	2,500^{^}
Portugal (AFP)	2× Platinum	16,000^{^}
Spain (PROMUSICAE)	Gold	10,000^{^}
United Kingdom (BPI)	Platinum	50,000^{^}
^{*} Sales figures based on certification alone.^{^} Shipments figures based on certification alone.

== Release history ==
Region	Date	Format	Label	Ref.
United Kingdom	5 November 2007	DVD	Island	
Canada	6 November 2007	DVD	Universal	
Australia	9 November 2007	DVD	Universal	
France	12 November 2007	DVD	Universal	
Sweden	12 November 2007	DVD	Universal	
United States	13 November 2007	DVD	Universal Republic	
Japan	5 December 2007	DVD	Universal	
Germany	15 January 2008	DVD	Universal	
United Kingdom	27 October 2008	Blu-ray	Island	
France	24 November 2008	Blu-ray	Universal	
Germany	28 November 2008	Blu-ray	Universal	
Sweden	2 February 2009	Blu-ray	Universal	
Australia	3 April 2009	Blu-ray	Universal	
Canada	27 September 2011	Blu-ray	Universal	
Various	11 December 2015	LP	Island	
