= Amy (2015 film) =

2015 film by Asif Kapadia

- Theatrical release poster
- Directed by: Asif Kapadia
- Produced by: James Gay-Rees
- Cinematography: Matt Curtis
- Edited by: Chris King
- Music by: Amy Winehouse; Antônio Pinto
- Production companies: Film4; Krishwerkz Entertainment; On the Corner Films; Playmaker Films; Universal Music
- Distributed by: Altitude Film Distribution
- Release dates: 16 May 2015 (Cannes); 3 July 2015 (United Kingdom)
- Running time: 128 minutes
- Country: United Kingdom
- Language: English
- Budget: $3.4 million
- Box office: $23.7 million

Amy is a 2015 British documentary film directed by Asif Kapadia and produced by James Gay-Rees. The film covers English singer-songwriter Amy Winehouse's life and her struggle with substance abuse, both before and after her career blossomed, and which eventually caused her death.

In February 2015, a teaser trailer based on the life of Winehouse debuted at a pre-Grammys event. David Joseph, CEO of Universal Music UK, announced that the documentary titled Amy would be released later that year. He further stated: "About two years ago we decided to make a movie about her—her career and her life. It's a very complicated and tender movie. It tackles lots of things about family and media, fame, addiction, but most importantly, it captures the very heart of what she was about, which is an amazing person and a true musical genius."

Amy premiered in the Midnight Screenings section of the 2015 Cannes Film Festival. Distributed by the Altitude and A24, it was released theatrically on 3 July 2015. The film received critical acclaim, garnering 33 nominations and winning a total of 30 awards, including Best Documentary at the 28th European Film Awards, Best Documentary at the 69th British Academy Film Awards, Best Music Film at the 58th Grammy Awards and the Best Documentary Feature at the 88th Academy Awards. The success of Amy and the music of its soundtrack also led Winehouse to her second posthumous nomination at the 2016 BRIT Awards for British Female Solo Artist.

== Synopsis ==
The film narrative is focused on the life of singer-songwriter Amy Winehouse, who was found dead on 23 July 2011 from alcohol poisoning, at the age of 27 at her home in Camden, North London.

The film starts with a 1998 home movie depicting a 14-year-old Winehouse singing along with her long-time friend, Juliette Ashby, at the birthday party of their mutual friend, Lauren Gilbert, at a home in Southgate, London. The rest of the documentary shows the songwriter's life, in a chronological order from her early childhood, to her music career, which attained commercial success through her debut album, Frank (2003), and second, final album Back to Black (2006), to her troubled relationships, self-harm, bulimia, the controversial media attention, and her downfall with her drug and alcohol addiction, all until her death in 2011. Winehouse is featured throughout the film talking about her early influences and how she felt about fame, love, depression, family and her music career.

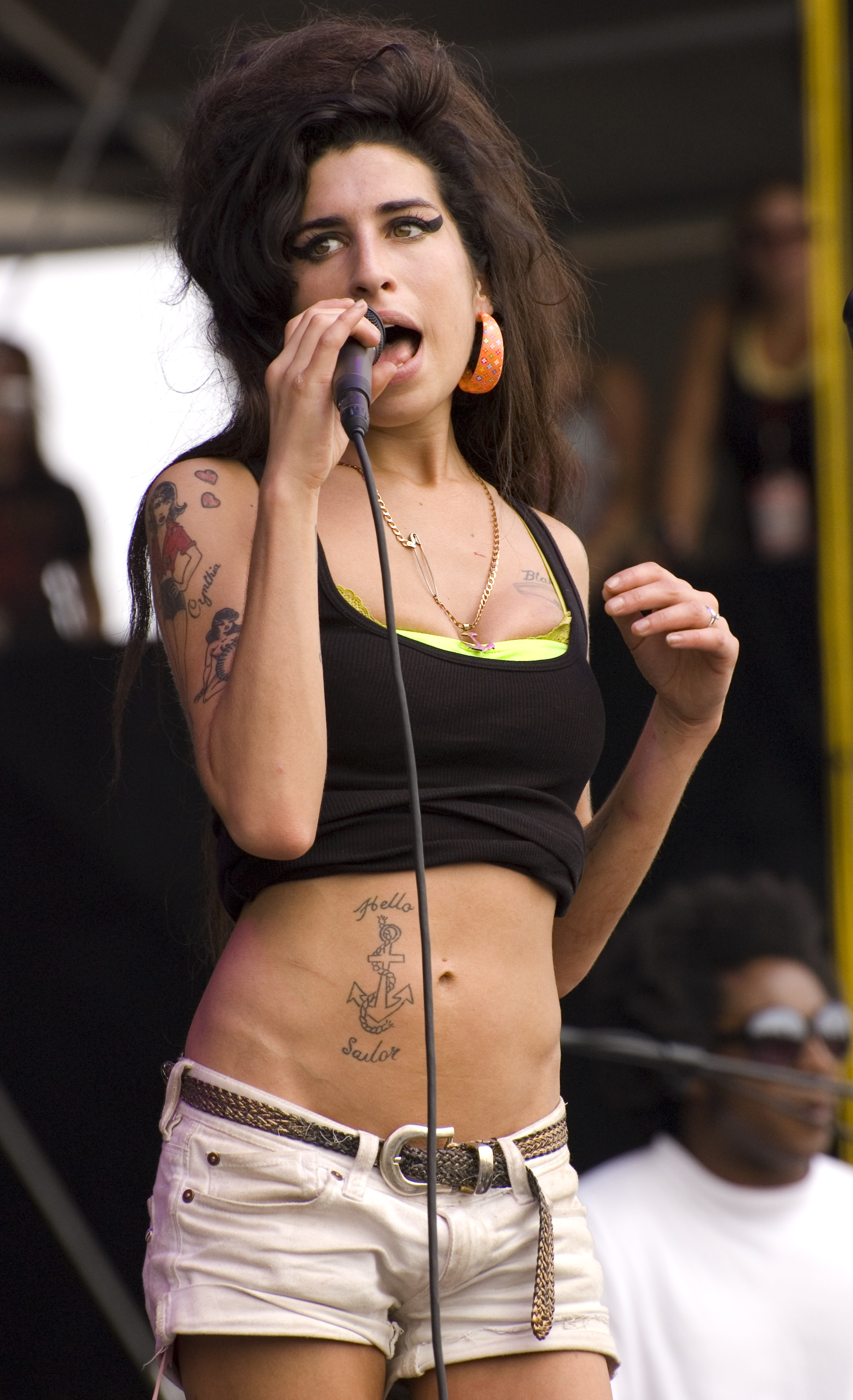
Amy Winehouse performing at the Virgin Festival, Pimlico, Baltimore in 2007

Kapadia conducted more than 100 interviews with Winehouse's friends and family that combine to provide a narrative around the star's life and is billed as "the singer in her own words." The film shows extensive unseen footage and unheard tracks Winehouse had recorded in the years before she died. Unheard tracks featured in the film are either rare live sessions, such as "Stronger Than Me", "In My Bed", "What Is It About Men?" and Donny Hathaway's "We're Still Friends", a cover of Johnny Mercer's "Moon River" from when Winehouse attended the National Youth Jazz Orchestra at the age of 16 in 2000 or never-before heard songs the star wrote, such as "Detachment" and "You Always Hurt The Ones You Love".

There are various pieces of extensive, unseen archive footage of Winehouse, such as when she is video-recorded in a cab with friend Tyler James in January 2001 and driving to tours and on her long-term friend, Lauren Gilbert's holiday tape in Majorca, Spain in August 2005. The film also shows various interviews, such as with Jonathan Ross, Tim Kash, and a video of when Winehouse is interviewed and talked to about singer Dido in 2004, when she promoted her debut album. The documentary also includes when Winehouse performed live from London on the Grammy Awards in 2008, and won the award for "Record of the Year".

The film also features footage from when she was filmed with her ex-husband Blake Fielder-Civil, various performances, and when she auditioned at Island Records in February 2003, singing "I Heard Love Is Blind". Also included is footage from when she was recording her second album in March 2006 and a duet single, "Body and Soul", with Tony Bennett in March 2011 as her last recording before her death. Some outtakes are also featured of her last shambolic performance in Belgrade, Serbia, a month before she died. The film concludes with long-term friend Juliette Ashby talking about her last phone call with Winehouse, footage of Winehouse's body being taken out of her home after her death, and Bennett stating: "Life teaches you really how to live it, if you live long enough." It then shows scenes from three days later of footage from Winehouse's funeral at Edgwarebury Cemetery and Golders Green Crematorium in North London. Closing clips end the film with videos of Winehouse from her early years until her death, with Antonio Pinto's composition, "Amy Forever".

== Contributors ==
The following heavily contributed in the documentary through archive footage and recorded interviews:

- Amy Winehouse
- Mitchell Winehouse, father
- Janis Winehouse-Collins, mother
- Raye Cosbert, manager and promoter
- Nick Shymanksy, ex-manager and friend
- Blake Fielder-Civil (credited as Blake Fielder), ex-husband
- Tyler James, friend and flatmate
- Juliette Ashby, friend and flatmate
- Lauren Gilbert, friend
- Blake Wood, friend
- Mos Def (credited as Yasiin Bey), musician
- Pete Doherty, musician
- Tony Bennett, musician
- Mark Ronson, producer
- Salaam Remi, producer
- Andrew Morris, bodyguard
- Cristina Romete, doctor
- Chip Somers, drug counsellor
- Sam Beste, pianist
- Dale Davis, musical director and bass guitarist
- Shomari Dilon, sound engineer
- 'Spiky' Phil Meynell, promoter of Trash Club
- Monte Lipman, chairman & CEO of Republic Records
- Lucian Grainge, head of Universal Music Group
- Guy Moot, UK President of Sony/ATV Music Publishing
- Nick Gatfield, president of Island Records
- Darcus Beese, A&R of Island Records

== Production ==
In 2012, Universal Music first approached film producer James Gay-Rees if the team behind the documentary film about Ayrton Senna would be interested in creating a project on Amy Winehouse.

On 25 April 2013, it was confirmed and announced that the team behind the documentary film Senna (2010), including director Asif Kapadia and Universal Music, were making a film about the late singer-songwriter. It was revealed that the film would be very similar to Senna, and that unseen footage of Winehouse would be shown. Kapadia and Gay-Rees stated: "Everyone fell under her spell. But tragically, Amy seemed to fall apart under the relentless media attention, her troubled relationships, her global success and precarious lifestyle." They introduced the project at the 2013 Cannes Film Festival, and it was said the documentary film would be released in 2015.

The film features scenes of Jelena Karleuša's 2013 Viva La Diva concert at Ušće Park erroneously presented as Winehouse's last concert at the Belgrade Fortress. Karleuša announced lawsuits against the filmmakers, before giving up on them out of respect for Winehouse.

== Music ==
The documentary features various unheard tracks Winehouse had completed from when her career began in 2003 until her death. The film includes live sessions, such as: "There Is No Greater Love", "Stronger Than Me", "In My Bed", "Rehab" and "What Is It About Men", covers of Johnny Mercer's "Moon River" from when Winehouse was 16 at the National Youth Jazz Orchestra in 2000 and Donny Hathaway's "We're Still Friends" and never-before heard songs the star wrote, such as "Detachment" and the lyrics to "You Always Hurt The Ones You Love", combined with Pinto's composition "Amy Lives". Winehouse is recorded in March 2006 when she is recording her 2007 single "Back to Black" and there are also cuts and edits of her well-known tracks, which helps unveil every piece of footage in the film.

=== Soundtrack ===
On 8 October 2015, Island Records announced that the soundtrack for the film would be released on 30 October 2015. The soundtrack includes various tracks that were included in the documentary; including classic tracks from Winehouse and compositions that were featured in the film by composer Antonio Pinto. The soundtrack was later released for the second time on vinyl in the United Kingdom and Ireland on 1 April 2016.

The 23-track album includes well-known tracks by Winehouse, such as "Stronger Than Me", "Tears Dry on Their Own", and "Back to Black", live sessions of "What Is It About Men", "Rehab", "We're Still Friends", and "Love Is a Losing Game", demo tracks; "Some Unholy War" and "Like Smoke"; a cover of The Zutons' "Valerie" performed by Winehouse and Mark Ronson and a 2011 version of "Body and Soul" performed by Winehouse and Tony Bennett. The soundtrack is also the second posthumous compilation album of Winehouse's music.

The commercial success and music behind the film earned Winehouse her second posthumous nomination at the 2016 BRIT Awards for "British Female Solo Artist", won by singer Adele and the film won a Grammy Award for "Best Music Film" at the 2016 Grammy Awards. This was the ninth indication of Amy's career to this award and the third posthumous. In December 2016, the nominations for the 2017 Grammy Awards were announced, and Amy was nominated for Grammy Award for Best Compilation Soundtrack for Visual Media.

== Release ==
Amy was released on 3 July 2015 in the United Kingdom, New York, and Los Angeles and worldwide on 10 July.

The film had its world premiere at the midnight screenings section at the 2015 Cannes Film Festival on 16 May 2015. Musicians such as HAIM, Leona Lewis, and Emeli Sandé were in attendance and gathered for the event, as well as the film crew. The film received its UK premiere at the Edinburgh International Film Festival in June 2015.

The film received a special screening in cinemas around the United Kingdom on 30 June, which was broadcast live from the London GALA Premiere at the Picturehouse. The screening provided questions from the public on Facebook, Twitter and from the audience. The film director Asif Kapadia, producer James Gay-Rees, and friend Nick Shymansky answered them and concluded with a tribute to Winehouse with her 2007 music video "Love Is a Losing Game".

=== Marketing ===
On 8 February 2015, a teaser trailer of Amy debuted at the pre-Grammy event in the build-up to the 2015 Grammy Awards. A teaser theatrical poster for the documentary film was released on 18 March 2015 on Twitter, and the first trailer was released on 2 April 2015, with receiving more than two million views Altitude Film's channel on YouTube. Footage from the teaser trailer shows Winehouse as a young woman at the beginning of her music career answering questions about how she sees herself as an artist and how she felt about fame.

Various official teaser clips from the film were released on YouTube to the buildup and throughout the documentary's release in July by Altitude Film and A24, including clips of Winehouse talking about how she felt about depression, how she thinks she would have handled fame from her early years, when she was recording her album Back to Black with her record producer Mark Ronson in March 2006 and when she was videotaped singing the "Happy Birthday" song at the fourteenth birthday party of her friend, Lauren Gilbert, in 1998 which received over one million views after 48 hours. In May 2015, the first teaser clip from the film was released. The short clip features a candid moment of Winehouse messing around with the camera and singing, while Nick Shymanksy, a member of her management team, recalls the beginning of her songwriting process; the video concludes with an unheard track Winehouse had recorded, "Detachment", which was arranged to be on her album Back To Black (2006).

On 18 May 2015, the official theatrical poster was released on the film's Twitter page. On 20 May 2015, the first official full-length trailer was released by Altitude Film. The trailer features the song "Back To Black", which was released in 2007. The video shows footage of Winehouse from her childhood to her early interviews, the rigorous media attention from the paparazzi, performances, various award winnings, her troubled relationship with her husband Blake Fielder-Civil and her statement of how she felt about him: "I fell in love with someone I would die for". The trailer also contains voices from people Winehouse knew and how they felt about her, such as Tony Bennett and Mos Def. The video concludes with "Love Is a Losing Game" with footage of Winehouse, various five star reviews, and Winehouse saying: "I don't think I'm going to be at all famous", and, "I'm not a girl trying to be a star... I'm just a girl that sings". The trailer received more than one million views after 24 hours on A24's channel on YouTube. After the film's release, a second official trailer was released that captures the controversial fame of Winehouse's celebrity lifestyle and how she struggled with it throughout her career. On 16 September 2015, another unseen clip was released of Winehouse videoed messing around with friend Nicky Shymansky in New York City in 2004, after the release of Frank (2003).

=== Home media ===
On 16 September 2015, it was announced by Universal Music that Amy would be released on DVD/Blu-ray and digital download on 2 November 2015 in the United Kingdom and Ireland. It was released in the United States on 1 December 2015. The two-disc package includes the film feature along with special features; such as a selection of previously unseen footage of Winehouse, as well as rare performances at Metropolis Studios, the film trailers and the making of the documentary. In November 2015, a special limited edition box set of Amy was released only in France, in which provides the film feature DVD, as well as a special booklet, a film poster, a selection of Amy Winehouse photographs and a T-shirt themed on the film.

== Reception ==
=== Box office ===
Amy broke the UK box office record for the highest opening weekend of a British documentary film, grossing at £519,000 from 133 cinemas three days after its release on 3 July. It also enjoyed success in the US, earning £142,000 from just six cinemas before it expanded in the following weeks. The film scored a $37,002 site average in the US in three days. The film opened with $222,015 across six sites, with a location average of $37,002 – $10,000 more than Fahrenheit 9/11 (2004) managed on its first weekend and even beating March of the Penguins (2005) 's $44,373 and the film had increased its box office peak after its initial release nationally on 10 July.

=== Critical response ===
Amy received high critical acclaim. On Rotten Tomatoes, the film has a 95% rating based on 227 reviews, with an average rating of 8.4/10. The site's consensus reads, "As riveting as it is sad, Amy is a powerfully honest look at the twisted relationship between art and celebrity—and the lethal spiral of addiction." Metacritic reports an 85 out of 100 rating based on 41 critics, indicating "universal acclaim".

Robbie Collin from The Telegraph rated the film as four out of five stars and praised the fact that "Amy Winehouse's glorious rise and heartbreaking fall is movingly documented by the director of Senna. Guy Lodge from Variety stated that: "The rise and devastating fall of the gifted British soul singer is chronicled in this deeply felt doc from 'Senna' director Asif Kapadia." Heat and Stylist both also rated the film five out of five, describing the film as "brilliant" and "unmissable". Peter Bradshaw from The Guardian gave the film five out of five, describing it as "a tragic masterpiece", and saying, "This documentary about the late British soul singer is an overwhelmingly sad, intimate—and dismaying—study of a woman whose talent and charisma helped turn her into a target". Geoffrey Macnab from The Independent also rated the documentary five out of five, reviewed it as "brilliant" and "unutterably sad", and stated: "There were many, many contributory factors to Amy Winehouse going off the rails, which are explored in the effect of Amy". According to The Guardian, Amy has been placed at no. 3 out of "The 50 Best Films of 2015 in Australia" at the end of the year and has been placed at no. 6 out of "The 50 Best 2015 Films in the UK".

=== Family's response ===
The film has been heavily criticised by Winehouse's father, Mitch Winehouse. He has distanced himself from the documentary, stating the film is "misleading" and "contains some basic untruths", according to his spokesman. On 7 May 2015, Winehouse's father Mitch appeared on This Morning and described the film as "preposterous". He further stated:

"The film is representing me in a not very good way. There is no balance, there's nothing about the foundation. It's portraying me and Amy in not a very good light."

However, he also said that the film contains "superb" and "beautiful" footage of Winehouse. He then added: "Half of me wants to say don't go see it. But then the other part of me is saying maybe go see the videos, put your headphones in and listen to Amy's music while they're watching the videos. It's the narrative that's the problem."

Universal Music instigated the documentary but they only secured the cooperation of the singer's parents, Mitch and Janis Winehouse, when they signed up Kapadia as the director for the film. Winehouse's father, who was a fan of the director's previous documentary film Senna (2010), wanted the same treatment to be given to his late daughter's documentary. However, upon watching the completed film about Winehouse, Mitch was unhappy with how the film portrayed him. Feeling he had been portrayed as the villain, Mitch threatened legal action until limited changes were made to the film. However, he has still publicly condemned the final cut of the film, claiming that Kapadia had an agenda to make him the anti-hero from the start.

Mitch requested that he wants the film to be further edited, but the film crew have declined his wish, adding: "When we were approached to make the film, we came on board with the full backing of the Winehouse family, and we approached the project with total objectivity." They said the film reflects findings from around "100 interviews with people that knew Amy". On 3 July 2015 (the day Amy was initially released), the singer's father, Mitch appeared on Loose Women to defend his place against the film and announced that he and Winehouse's former boyfriend, Reg Traviss, are making an alternative film, entitled A Letter To Amy, so it's a "more accurate" project, to "correct all the wrongs and omissions" that were in Kapadia's film. On 24 February 2016, Mitch stated on This Morning that he would prefer Adele to win the "British Female Solo Artist" award that his late daughter was posthumously nominated for at the 2016 BRIT Awards, feeling that his daughter was unfairly nominated based on the film's success.

A biopic about Winehouse's life entitled Back to Black (2024) was fully endorsed by the Winehouse estate, almost a decade after the release of Amy.

=== Accolades ===
Award	Category	Recipients and nominees	Outcome
Academy Awards	Best Documentary Feature	Asif Kapadia and James Gay-Rees	Won
ACE Eddie Awards	Best Edited Documentary	Chris King	Won
Austin Film Critics Association	Best Documentary	Amy	Nominated
Bodil Awards	Best Non-US Film	Amy	Nominated
Boston Society of Film Critics	Best Documentary Film	Amy	Won
BRIT Awards	Best British Female Solo Artist	Amy Winehouse	Nominated
British Academy Film Awards	Best Documentary	Amy	Won
British Academy Film Awards	Outstanding British Film	Amy	Nominated
British Independent Film Awards	Best British Independent Film	Amy	Nominated
British Independent Film Awards	Best Director	Asif Kapadia	Nominated
British Independent Film Awards	Best Documentary	Asif Kapadia and James Gay-Rees	Nominated
British Independent Film Awards	Producer of the Year	James Gay-Rees	Nominated
British Independent Film Awards	Outstanding Achievement in Craft	Chris King	Nominated
Broadcast Film Critics Association Awards	Best Documentary Feature	Amy	Won
Cannes Film Festival	L'Œil d'or	Amy	Nominated
Cannes Film Festival	Queer Palm	Amy	Nominated
Chicago Film Critics Association	Best Documentary	Amy	Won
Dallas–Fort Worth Film Critics Association	Best Documentary Film	Amy	Won
Detroit Film Critics Society	Best Documentary	Amy	Won
East End Film Festival	Best Documentary	Amy	Nominated
Edinburgh International Film Festival	Audience Award	Amy	Nominated
Edinburgh International Film Festival	Best Documentary Feature Film	Amy	Nominated
Empire Awards	Best Documentary	Amy	Won
European Film Awards	Best European Documentary	Amy	Won
Evening Standard British Film Awards	Best Documentary	Amy	Won
Film Club's The Lost Weekend Awards	Best Soundtrack	Amy - The Original Soundtrack	Won
Florida Film Critics Circle Awards	Best Documentary	Amy	Won
Golden Trailer Awards	Best Documentary	Amy ("Trailer 2")	Nominated
Golden Trailer Awards	Best Foreign Documentary	Amy	Won
Golden Trailer Awards	Best Foreign Graphics in a Trailer	Amy ("Teaser")	Nominated
Golden Trailer Awards	Best Foreign Teaser	Amy ("Teaser")	Nominated
Golden Trailer Awards	Most Original Foreign Teaser	Amy ("Teaser")	Nominated
Golden Trailer Awards	Best Documentary TV Spot	Amy	Nominated
Grammy Awards	Best Music Film	Asif Kapadia, James Gay-Rees	Won
Hollywood Film Awards	Documentary of the Year	Amy	Won
Houston Film Critics Society	Best Documentary Feature	Amy	Nominated
Indiewire Critics Poll	Best Documentary	Amy	Runner-up
International Documentary Association	Best Feature Award	Amy	Nominated
London Film Critics' Circle	Film of the Year	Amy	Nominated
London Film Critics' Circle	British / Irish Film of the Year	Amy	Nominated
London Film Critics' Circle	Documentary of the Year	Amy	Won
Los Angeles Film Critics Association	Best Documentary Film	Amy	Won
MTV Movie Awards	Best Documentary	Amy	Won
National Board of Review	Best Documentary Film	Amy	Won
National Film Awards	Best Director	Asif Kapadia	Won
National Film Awards	Best Documentary	Amy	Won
New York Film Critics Online	Best Documentary	Amy	Won
Online Film Critics Society	Best Documentary Film	Amy	Nominated
Producers Guild of America Award	Outstanding Producer of Documentary Theatrical Motion Pictures	James Gay-Rees	Won
San Diego Film Critics Society	Best Documentary	Amy	Nominated
San Francisco Film Critics Circle	Best Documentary	Amy	Nominated
Satellite Awards	Best Documentary Film	Amy	Won
St. Louis Film Critics Association	Best Soundtrack	Amy - The Original Soundtrack	Nominated
St. Louis Film Critics Association	Best Documentary Film	Amy	Won
Toronto Film Critics Association	Best Documentary Film	Amy	Runner-up
Vancouver Film Critics Circle	Best Documentary	Amy	Won
Washington D.C. Area Film Critics Association	Best Documentary	Amy	Won
Women Film Critics Circle Awards	Best Documentary by or About Women	Amy	Won

== See also ==
- Amy Winehouse: Back to Black (2018)
