= Amy (soundtrack) =

Film score by Amy Winehouse
- Released: 30 October 2015
- Recorded: 2002–15
- Genres: Rhythm and blues; jazz; soul; neo soul; hip-hop
- Length: 62:42
- Label: Island
- Producers: Salaam Remi; Mark Ronson

Amy Winehouse chronology
Amy Winehouse at the BBC (2012)	Amy (2015)	Back to Black (Songs from the Original Motion Picture) (2024)

Amy is an original motion picture soundtrack to the 2015 film of the same name. It was released by Island Records on 30 October 2015. It is the second posthumous compilation album by English singer and songwriter Amy Winehouse (the subject of the film). It features original tracks, covers, previously unreleased versions and demos that were included in the documentary and also features music by Brazilian composer Antônio Pinto. The Name of the Wave by British musician and producer William Orbit also makes an appearance on the soundtrack. The soundtrack peaked at number 19 on the UK Albums Chart.

Professional ratings
Aggregate scores
Source	Rating
Metacritic	59/100
Review scores
Source	Rating
The Independent	3/5 stars
NME	3.5/5 stars
Pitchfork	5.4
The Guardian	3/5 stars

== Background ==
On 8 October 2015, it was announced by Island Records that the original soundtrack for Amy would be released on 30 October 2015. On 26 October 2015, a two-minute sampler of the soundtrack was released on Facebook and Twitter. The soundtrack was later released for the second time on vinyl in the United Kingdom and Ireland on 1 April 2016.

== Description ==
The album includes well-known tracks by Winehouse, such as "Stronger Than Me", "Tears Dry on Their Own" and "Back to Black", live sessions of "What Is It About Men", "Rehab", "We're Still Friends" and "Love Is a Losing Game", a downtempo version of "Some Unholy War", a demo version of "Like Smoke", a cover of The Zutons' "Valerie" performed by Winehouse and Mark Ronson, and a 2011 version of "Body and Soul" performed by Winehouse and Tony Bennett. The soundtrack is the second posthumous compilation album by Winehouse. The album also features original compositions that were included on the documentary by Antônio Pinto.

== Accolades ==
In late October 2015, director Asif Kapadia won an award for Best Soundtrack for the original motion picture album for Amy at the Film Club's The Lost Weekend Awards. As of June 2016, the soundtrack itself has been nominated for a total of four awards; including Best Soundtrack at the St. Louis Film Critics Association and the music behind the film has led Winehouse a posthumous nomination at the 2016 BRIT Awards for British Female Solo Artist. The soundtrack would also win the Grammy Award for Best Music Film at the 2016 ceremony.

== Track listing ==
All tracks are written by Amy Winehouse and Antônio Pinto, unless otherwise noted.

Amy (Original Motion Picture Soundtrack)
No.	Title	Artist(s)	Length
1.	"Opening"	Antônio Pinto	0:58
2.	"Stronger Than Me"	Amy Winehouse	3:34
3.	"Poetic Finale"	Antônio Pinto	2:53
4.	"What Is It About Men" (Live at the North Sea Jazz Festival)	Amy Winehouse	4:45
5.	"Walk"	Antônio Pinto	1:14
6.	"Some Unholy War" (Downtempo Version)	Amy Winehouse	3:15
7.	"Holiday Texts"	Antônio Pinto	0:52
8.	"Kidnapping Amy"	Antônio Pinto	1:44
9.	"Like Smoke" (Demo)	Amy Winehouse	1:22
10.	"Tears Dry on Their Own"	Amy Winehouse	3:07
11.	"Seperação Fotos"	Antônio Pinto	0:54
12.	"The Name of the Wave" (written by William Orbit)	Strange Cargo	6:24
13.	"Back to Black" (A cappella / Album Medley)	Amy Winehouse	3:49
14.	"Cynthia"	Antônio Pinto	1:15
15.	"Rehab" (Live on Later... with Jools Holland)	Amy Winehouse	3:41
16.	"In the Studio"	Antônio Pinto	1:05
17.	"We're Still Friends" (Live at Union Chapel)	Amy Winehouse	2:56
18.	"Amy Lives"	Antônio Pinto	2:15
19.	"Love Is a Losing Game" (Live at the Mercury Awards)	Amy Winehouse	2:32
20.	"Arrested"	Antônio Pinto	1:04
21.	"Body and Soul" (written by Edward Heyman, Robert Sour, Frank Eyton and John Green)	Tony Bennett and Amy Winehouse	3:23
22.	"Amy Forever"	Antônio Pinto	2:49
23.	"Valerie" (BBC Radio 1 Live Lounge; written by Sean Payne, Dave McCabe, Abi Harding, Boyan Chowdhury and Russell Pritchard)	Amy Winehouse	3:52
Total length:			62:42

== Charts ==
Chart (2015)	Peak position
Australian Digital Albums (ARIA)	38
Belgian Albums (Ultratop Flanders)	50
Belgian Albums (Ultratop Wallonia)	93
Brazilian Albums (ABPD)	10
Czech Albums (ČNS IFPI)	30
Dutch Albums (Album Top 100)	51
Greek Albums (IFPI)	35
Irish Compilation Albums (IRMA)	5
Italian Compilation Albums (FIMI)	7
Polish Albums (ZPAV)	26
Scottish Albums (Official Charts)	23
Swiss Albums (Schweizer Hitparade)	57
UK Albums (Official Charts)	19
UK R&B Albums (Official Charts)	4
UK Soundtrack Albums (Official Charts)	1
US Soundtrack Albums (Billboard)	11
US Top R&B/Hip-Hop Albums (Billboard)	28

== Certifications ==
Region	Certification	Certified units/sales
United Kingdom (BPI)	Silver	60,000^{‡}
^{‡} Sales+streaming figures based on certification alone.

== Release history ==
Region	Date	Format	Label
Various	30 October 2015	CD; digital download	Island
Various	1 April 2016	LP	Island
