= Our Day Will Come =

1962 single by Ruby & the Romantics

Single by Ruby & the Romantics

from the album Our Day Will Come
- B-side: "Moonlight and Music"
- Released: December 1962
- Genre: R&B; bossa nova
- Length: 2:32
- Label: Kapp
- Songwriters: Bob Hilliard; Mort Garson
- Producer: Allen Stanton

Ruby & the Romantics singles chronology
"Our Day Will Come" (1962)	"My Summer Love" (1963)

"Our Day Will Come" is a popular song composed by Mort Garson with lyrics by Bob Hilliard. It was recorded by American R&B group Ruby & the Romantics in early December 1962, reaching No. 1 on the Billboard Hot 100.

== Ruby & the Romantics' original version ==
The song's composers were hoping to place "Our Day Will Come" with an established easy listening act and only agreed to let the new R&B group Ruby & the Romantics record the song after Kapp Records' A&R director Al Stanton promised that, if the Ruby & the Romantics' single failed, Kapp would record the song with Jack Jones. Stanton cut two versions of "Our Day Will Come" with Ruby & the Romantics, one with a mid-tempo arrangement and the other in a bossa nova style; the latter version, featuring a Hammond organ solo, was selected for release as a single in December 1962 and reached No. 1 on the Billboard Hot 100 the week of March 23, 1963. "Our Day Will Come" also charted at No. 11 in Australia and at No. 38 the United Kingdom. The personnel on the original recording were: Leroy Glover on organ; Vinnie Bell, Al Gorgoni and Kenny Burrell on guitars; Russ Savakus on bass; Gary Chester on drums; and George Devens on percussion.

=== Charts ===
Chart (1963)	Peak position
Australia (Kent Music Report)	11
Canada (CHUM Hit Parade)	19
New Zealand (Lever Hit Parade)	1
UK Singles (Official Charts)	38
US Billboard Hot 100	1
US Hot R&B Singles (Billboard)	1

== Frankie Valli version ==
"Our Day Will Come"

Single by Frankie Valli

from the album Our Day Will Come
- B-side: "You Can Bet (I Ain't Goin' Nowhere)"
- Released: October 1975
- Genre: Disco
- Length: 5:47 (album) 4:02 (single)
- Label: Private Stock
- Songwriters: Bob Hilliard; Mort Garson

Frankie Valli singles chronology
"Swearin' to God" (1975)	"Our Day Will Come" (1975)	"Fallen Angel" (1976)

American singer Frankie Valli recorded and released "Our Day Will Come" in 1975. His rendition features Patti Austin on accompanying vocals. Cash Box said that "minimum use of strings on top as the artist’s cutting sound and super-fine alto sax provides that icing that balances out the broad bottom indigenous to disco dance depots."

Valli's version reached No. 11 on the US Billboard Hot 100 and spent two weeks at No. 2 on the Adult Contemporary chart. Internationally, it also reached the No. 30 in Canada.

Record World called it "one of [Valli's] uniquely patented vocal workouts."

=== Charts ===
==== Weekly charts ====
Chart (1975)	Peak position
Canada Top Singles (RPM)	30
Canada Adult Contemporary (RPM)	7
US Billboard Hot 100	11
US Adult Contemporary (Billboard)	2
US Cash Box Top 100	14

==== Year-end charts ====
Chart (1975)	Position
US (Joel Whitburn's Pop Annual)	112

== Amy Winehouse version ==
"Our Day Will Come"

Single by Amy Winehouse

from the album Lioness: Hidden Treasures
- Released: November 2, 2011
- Recorded: May 2002
- Genre: Reggae
- Length: 2:50
- Label: Island
- Songwriters: Bob Hilliard; Mort Garson
- Producer: Salaam Remi

Amy Winehouse singles chronology
"Body and Soul" (2011)	"Our Day Will Come" (2011)	"Cherry Wine" (2012)

Recorded for her 2003 debut album Frank, the Amy Winehouse remake of "Our Day Will Come" was first issued on the singer's posthumous compilation album Lioness: Hidden Treasures. The song was released to UK contemporary hit radio on November 2, 2011, as the album's second single, Winehouse's first solo single release since "Love Is a Losing Game" in 2007 (a duet with Tony Bennett on "Body and Soul" had been issued as a single on September 14, 2011, which would have been her 28th birthday).

Producer Salaam Remi who had worked with Winehouse on her albums Frank and Back to Black, as well as on the posthumous compilation, stated that "Our Day Will Come" will serve as a poignant reminder of the star's talent. The music video for "Our Day Will Come": a montage of Winehouse throughout her career with clips from music videos, live performances and press coverage, was sent to UK music channels on 21 November 2011. Following the release of the music video, Winehouse's father tweeted: "I just almost watched Amy's 'Our Day Will Come' video. She is so lovely." Robert Copsey of Digital Spy gave the song four stars out of five and a positive review, stating:

That said, the thinking behind the decision to release Winehouse's rendition of Ruby and the Romantics' 1963 hit 'Our Day Will Come' quickly becomes apparent. Over a smoky melody and reggae-tinged beat she promises wistfully, "Our day will come, and we'll have everything," before professing her everlasting love for her beau. The result serves as a timely reminder that beneath the demons that plagued her final years, her raw talent was undeniable.

=== Charts ===
Chart (2011–2012)	Peak position
Belgium (Ultratop 50 Flanders)	48
Belgium (Ultratop 50 Wallonia)	48
France (SNEP)	54
Hungary (Rádiós Top 40)	27
Iceland (Tónlistinn)	14
Italy (FIMI)	31
Japan Hot 100 (Billboard)	14
Netherlands (Single Top 100)	52
Scottish Singles Sales (Official Charts)	46
Spain (Promusicae)	26
Switzerland (Schweizer Hitparade)	69
UK Singles (Official Charts)	29
UK Hip Hop/R&B (Official Charts)	25

=== Certifications ===
Region	Certification	Certified units/sales
Brazil (Pro-Música Brasil)	Gold	30,000^{‡}
New Zealand (RMNZ)	Gold	15,000^{‡}
United Kingdom (BPI)	Silver	200,000^{‡}
^{‡} Sales+streaming figures based on certification alone.
