= Justin Myers (author) =

British author and blogger

Justin Myers is a British author and blogger known for his works of romantic fiction.

Myers writes a blog called The Guyliner which started in 2010 and previously focused on his gay dating life. This formed the basis for his first book The Last Romeo. His later works The Magnificent Sons and The Fake-Up also explore LGBT relationships.

Myers continues to write the blog which periodically features a satirical reflection on The Guardian's weekly "Blind date" feature. He has also written for GQ, Gay Times and the Official Charts Company.

== Personal life ==
Myers was born on 23 December 1975 in West Yorkshire and now lives in London with his partner Paul.
