= Lioness: Hidden Treasures =

Compilation album by Amy Winehouse
- Released: 2 December 2011
- Recorded: 2002–2011
- Studios: Creative Space (Miami) (Note: Tracks 1, 8 and 10); Instrument Zoo (Miami) (Note: Tracks 1–3, 5, 7 and 12); Doghouse (Henley-on-Thames, England) (Note: Track 2); Real World (Box, England) (Note: Tracks 2 and 5); Platinum Sound (New York City) (Note: Tracks 3 and 12); Daptone's House of Soul (New York City) (Note: Track 4); EMI (London) (Note: Track 7); La Source (London) (Note: Track 9); Bennett (Englewood, New Jersey) (Note: Track 11); Amy's house (London) (Note: Track 12)
- Genres: Jazz; R&B; soul
- Length: 45:13
- Labels: Island; Lioness
- Producers: Dae Bennett; Paul O'Duffy; Phil Ramone; Salaam Remi (Note: Credited in the liner notes as "Salaamremi.com" for production duties.); Mark Ronson
- Compilers: Salaam Remi; Mark Ronson

Amy Winehouse chronology
I Told You I Was Trouble: Live in London (2007)	Lioness: Hidden Treasures (2011)	Amy Winehouse at the BBC (2012)

Singles from Lioness: Hidden Treasures
- 1. "Body and Soul" Released: 14 September 2011; 2. "Our Day Will Come" Released: 2 November 2011

Lioness: Hidden Treasures is a posthumous compilation album by the English singer and songwriter Amy Winehouse. It was released on 2 December 2011 by Island Records. It features unreleased songs, covers and demos selected by Mark Ronson, Salaam Remi and Winehouse's family, including the first single, "Body and Soul", with Tony Bennett. The album was released in aid of the Amy Winehouse Foundation. "Our Day Will Come" was released as the album's second and final single on 4 December, and was Winehouse's first solo single to be released since 2007.

== Background ==
Lioness: Hidden Treasures was announced for release on 31 October 2011 via Winehouse's official website. The album is a compilation of recordings prior to the release of Winehouse's debut studio album, Frank, in 2002, up to music she was working on in 2011. Island Records co-president Ted Cockle emphasised that Lioness is not in any way the planned follow-up to Winehouse's album Back to Black (2006). Only two songs intended for the planned follow-up had been completed prior to her death.

Producers Salaam Remi and Mark Ronson compiled the album with the consent of the Winehouse family. They worked together listening to thousands of hours of vocals by Winehouse. Remi told NME that the album would not lead to "a Tupac situation", referring to Tupac Shakur, in whose name seven posthumous studio albums have been released since his death in 1996. He stated, "A lot of people, through the other antics that were going on with her personally, didn't get that she was at the top of what she did. Coming to Miami was her escape from all of that, and her writing process could document her life, whether it was recording the pain or the loneliness or the humour. It makes no sense for these songs to be sitting on a hard drive, withering away."

Two tracks from Lioness: Hidden Treasures were premiered on BBC Radio 1 and BBC Radio 1Xtra on 3 November 2011. The Chris Moyles Show aired the first play of "Our Day Will Come", while DJ Twin B broadcast the world premiere of "Like Smoke", which features Nas. The album cover was shot by Canadian rock singer-songwriter Bryan Adams in 2007.

== Singles ==
"Body and Soul", Winehouse's final studio recording and a duet with Tony Bennett, was released as a single on 14 September 2011, in commemoration of what would have been Winehouse's 28th birthday. It was released as the first single from Lioness: Hidden Treasures and Tony Bennett's Duets II album. Profits from the release of the single were donated to the Amy Winehouse Foundation. "Our Day Will Come" was released as the second single from the album. The song was added to the BBC Radio 1 playlist on 2 November 2011, entering the C-list. It was also named BBC Radio 2's "Record of the Week" for the week beginning 5 November.

== Critical reception ==
Professional ratings
Aggregate scores
Source	Rating
AnyDecentMusic?	6.0/10
Metacritic	65/100
Review scores
Source	Rating
AllMusic	4/5 stars
The A.V. Club	C+
Entertainment Weekly	B
The Guardian	3/5 stars
The Independent	3/5 stars
Pitchfork	6.3/10
Q	3/5 stars
Rolling Stone	3.5/5 stars
Slant Magazine	2.5/5 stars
Spin	8/10

Lioness: Hidden Treasures received generally mixed to positive reviews from music critics. At Metacritic, which assigns a normalised rating out of 100 to reviews from mainstream publications, the album received an average score of 65, based on 28 reviews. Q called it "an admirable tribute if frequently deafened by the echo of its tragic catalyst." Jon Pareles of The New York Times commented that the album "ekes out all it can from the archives" and found it to be "just the scraps of what might have been." Andrew Ryce of Pitchfork wrote in his review, "There's little on Lioness: Hidden Treasures that sounds throwaway, or like it should have never been released; but there's equally little that sounds absolutely essential." AllMusic editor John Bush felt that "only the songwriting and prevalence of covers or 'original versions' reveal that this is a posthumous collection", crediting Salaam Remi and Mark Ronson for making the album "strikingly uniform".

== Commercial performance ==
Lioness: Hidden Treasures debuted at number one on the UK Albums Chart with 194,966 copies sold in its first week, marking the biggest first-week sales of Winehouse's career, as well as the fourth fastest-selling album of 2011. It was certified triple platinum by the British Phonographic Industry (BPI) on 26 June 2020, denoting shipments in excess of 900,000 copies in the United Kingdom. The album debuted at number five on the Billboard 200 with first-week sales of 114,000 units, making it Winehouse's highest-debuting album in the United States. As of July 2012, it had sold 423,000 copies in the US.

The album topped the charts in Austria, Greece, Netherlands, Portugal and Switzerland, while reaching the top five in Canada, New Zealand and several European countries, including Belgium, Denmark, France, Germany, Ireland, Italy, Spain and Sweden. Lioness: Hidden Treasures had sold 2.4 million copies worldwide by the end of 2011, becoming the 11th best-selling album of 2011, as well as the fourth best-selling album by a British artist. The International Federation of the Phonographic Industry (IFPI) certified the album platinum in late 2011, denoting sales in excess of one million copies in Europe.

== Track listing ==
No.	Title	Writer(s)	Producer(s)	Length
1.	"Our Day Will Come"	Mort Garson; Bob Hilliard	Salaam Remi	2:49
2.	"Between the Cheats"	Amy Winehouse; Remi	Remi	3:33
3.	"Tears Dry" (original version)	Winehouse; Nickolas Ashford; Valerie Simpson	Remi	4:08
4.	"Will You Still Love Me Tomorrow?" (2011)	Gerry Goffin; Carole King	Mark Ronson	4:23
5.	"Like Smoke" (featuring Nas)	Remi; Winehouse; Nasir Jones	Remi	4:38
6.	"Valerie" ('68 version)	Sean Payne; Dave McCabe; Abi Harding; Boyan Chowdhury; Russell Pritchard	Ronson	4:00
7.	"The Girl from Ipanema"	Norman Gimbel; Antônio Carlos Jobim; Vinicius de Moraes	Remi	2:47
8.	"Half Time"	Winehouse; Fin Greenall	Remi	3:51
9.	"Wake Up Alone" (original recording)	Winehouse; Paul O'Duffy	O'Duffy	4:24
10.	"Best Friends, Right?"	Winehouse	Remi	2:56
11.	"Body and Soul" (with Tony Bennett)	Edward Heyman; Robert Sour; Frank Eyton; John Green	Phil Ramone; Dae Bennett	3:19
12.	"A Song for You"	Leon Russell	Remi	4:29

== Personnel ==
Credits adapted from the liner notes of Lioness: Hidden Treasures.

=== Musicians ===
- Amy Winehouse – vocals (all tracks); guitar (tracks 7, 8, 10); acoustic guitar (track 9)
- Salaam Remi – arrangements (tracks 1–3, 5, 7, 8, 10, 12); bass, drums (tracks 1–3, 5, 7, 10, 12); guitar (tracks 1–3, 5, 12); piano (tracks 1, 2); organ, Rhodes (track 1); bells (track 2); background vocals (track 3)
- Mark Ronson – arrangements (tracks 4, 6); orchestra arrangements (track 4)
- Zalon – backing vocals arrangements (tracks 1–3, 5, 7, 8); background vocals (tracks 1–3, 5, 7, 8); additional vocals (track 8)
- Heshima Thompson – backing vocals arrangements (tracks 1–3, 5, 7, 8); background vocals (tracks 1–3, 5, 7, 8); additional vocals (track 8)
- Vincent Henry – horns (track 1); horn arrangements (tracks 1, 3, 5, 7, 10, 12); flutes (tracks 1, 3, 7, 10, 12); guitar (tracks 1–3, 5, 7, 12); saxophone (tracks 2, 3, 7, 10, 12); clarinet (tracks 10, 12)
- Bruce Purse – shotgun (track 1); trumpet (tracks 1, 10)
- Troy Auxilly-Wilson – drums (track 1)
- Glen Lewis – background vocals (track 2)
- John Adams – Wurly (tracks 2, 12); Rhodes (tracks 2, 3, 10, 12); organ, piano (tracks 3, 12); synths (tracks 3, 10); vibraphone (track 10)
- Stephen Coleman – string arrangements (track 2, 7, 12)
- Tim Davies – string arrangements (track 3, 5)
- Homer Steinweiss – drums (tracks 4, 6)
- Nick Movshon – bass (tracks 4, 6)
- Binky Griptite – guitar (tracks 4, 6)
- Thomas Brenneck – guitar (tracks 4, 6)
- Dave Guy – trumpet (tracks 4, 6)
- Ian Hendrickson-Smith – tenor saxophone (track 4); baritone saxophone (track 6)
- Cochemea Gastelum – baritone saxophone (track 4)
- Victor Axelrod – piano (track 4)
- Kevin C. Keys – background vocals (track 4)
- Saundra Williams – background vocals (track 4)
- Angela "AnGee" Blake – background vocals (track 4)
- Perry Montague-Mason – orchestra leader (track 4)
- Chris Elliott – orchestra arrangements (track 4)
- Nas – featured vocals (track 5)
- Dale Davies – bass, guitar (track 5)
- James Poyser – keyboards (track 5); synths, flutes (track 8)
- Czech Film Orchestra – strings (track 5)
- Ahmir "Questlove" Thompson – percussion (track 6); drums (track 8)
- Neal Sugarman – tenor saxophone (track 6)
- Paul O'Duffy – arrangements, bass, vibes, rhythm (track 8)
- Tony Bennett – vocals (track 11)
- Jorge Calandrelli – arrangements, conducting (track 11)
- Lee Musiker – piano (track 11)
- Marshall Wood – bass (track 11)
- Tim Cobb – bass (track 11)
- David Finck – bass (track 11)
- Harold Jones – drums (track 11)
- Gray Sargent – guitar (track 11)
- Elena Barere – concertmaster (track 11)
- Avril Brown, Sean Carney, Jonathan Dinklage, Cornelius Dufallo, Sanguen Eanet, Katherine Fong, Ming Feng Hsin, Karen Karlsrud, Yoon Kwon, Ann Leathers, Matthew Lehmann, Liz Lim Dutton, Katherine Livolsi, Laura McGinnis, Yurika Mok, Lorenza Ponce, Carol Pool, Wen Qian, Catherine Sim, Shirien Taylor Donahue, Entcho Todorov, Una Tone, Yuri Vodovoz, Xiao-Dong Wang, Nancy Wu – violin (track 11)
- Vincent Lionti, Adria Benjamin, Karen Dreyfus, Desiree Elsevier, Monica Gerard, David Gold, Todd Low, Craig Mumm, Alissa Smith, Judy Witmer – viola (track 11)
- Richard Locker, Diane Barere, Stephanie Cummins, David Eggar, Jeanne Leblanc, Ellen Westermann – cello (track 11)
- Grace Paradise – harp (track 11)
- Pamela Sklar – flute, piccolo (track 11)
- Katherine Fink – flute, piccolo (track 11)
- Diane Lesser – oboe, English horn (track 11)
- Charles Pillow – clarinet, bass clarinet (track 11)
- Marc Goldberg – bassoon (track 11)
- Philip Myers, Thomas Jöstlein, Bob Carlisle, Barbara Jöstlein Currie, Ann Scherer – French horn (track 11)
- Mike Davis – trombone (track 11)
- George Flynn – bass trombone (track 11)
- Gordon Gottlieb – percussion (track 11)
- Erik Charlston – percussion (track 11)
- Ben Herman – percussion (track 11)

=== Technical ===
- Salaam Remi – production (tracks 1–3, 5, 7, 8, 10, 12)
- Gary Noble – mixing (tracks 1–3, 5, 7, 8, 10, 12); recording (tracks 1, 5, 8, 10)
- Xavier Stephenson – mixing assistance (tracks 1–3, 5, 7, 8, 10, 12)
- Mark Ronson – production (tracks 4, 6)
- Gabriel Roth – engineering (tracks 4, 6)
- Wayne Gordon – additional engineering, tape operation (tracks 4, 6)
- Tom Elmhirst – mixing (tracks 4, 6)
- Ben Baptie – mixing assistance (tracks 4, 6)
- Stuart Hawkes – mastering
- Gleyder "Gee" Disla – recording (tracks 1–3, 5, 7, 12)
- Shomari Dillon – engineering assistance (tracks 1, 8, 10)
- Neil Dyer – engineering assistance (tracks 1–3, 5, 7, 12)
- Greg Freeman – engineering assistance (tracks 2, 5)
- Franklin Socorro – recording (tracks 3, 5, 12)
- Vaughan Merrick – Pro-Tools editing and engineering (track 4)
- Ben Jackson – recording (track 7)
- Scott McCormick – recording (track 7)
- Steven Mandel – recording (track 7)
- Paul O'Duffy – production, recording (track 8)
- Danny Bennett – executive production (track 11)
- Phil Ramone – production (track 11)
- Dae Bennett – production, recording, mixing (track 11)
- Alessandro Perrotta – mixing assistance (track 11)
- Brian Chirlo – mixing assistance (track 11)
- Adam Bancroft – mixing assistance (track 11)
- Nicolas Essig – mixing assistance (track 11)
- Bob Ludwig – mastering (track 11)
- Lee Musiker – music direction for Tony Bennett (track 11)
- Jill Dell'Abate – production management, contractor (track 11)
- Vance Anderson – production coordination (track 11)

=== Artwork ===
- Mark Ronson – liner notes
- Salaam Remi – liner notes
- Mitch Winehouse – liner notes
- Janis Winehouse – liner notes
- Bryan Adams – front cover and all booklet photography
- Ross Halfin – back cover photograph
- Alex Hutchinson – design

== Charts ==
=== Weekly charts ===
Chart (2011–2012)	Peak position
Australian Albums (ARIA)	8
Australian Urban Albums (ARIA)	1
Austrian Albums (Ö3 Austria)	1
Belgian Albums (Ultratop Flanders)	3
Belgian Alternative Albums (Ultratop Flanders)	2
Belgian Albums (Ultratop Wallonia)	6
Canadian Albums (Billboard)	5
Croatian Albums (HDU)	4
Czech Albums (ČNS IFPI)	5
Danish Albums (Hitlisten)	5
Dutch Albums (Album Top 100)	1
Finnish Albums (Suomen virallinen lista)	18
French Albums (SNEP)	2
German Albums (Offizielle Top 100)	3
Greek Albums (IFPI)	1
Hungarian Albums (MAHASZ)	12
Irish Albums (IRMA)	4
Italian Albums (FIMI)	4
Japanese Albums (Oricon)	29
Mexican Albums (Top 100 Mexico)	12
New Zealand Albums (RMNZ)	2
Norwegian Albums (VG-lista)	6
Polish Albums (ZPAV)	2
Portuguese Albums (AFP)	1
Russian Albums (2M)	3
Scottish Albums (Official Charts)	2
South Korean Albums (Gaon)	14
Spanish Albums (Promusicae)	2
Swedish Albums (Sverigetopplistan)	4
Swiss Albums (Schweizer Hitparade)	1
UK Albums (Official Charts)	1
US Billboard 200	5
US Top R&B/Hip-Hop Albums (Billboard)	1
US Indie Store Album Sales (Billboard)	2

=== Year-end charts ===
Chart (2011)	Position
Australian Albums (ARIA)	63
Australian Urban Albums (ARIA)	13
Austrian Albums (Ö3 Austria)	41
Belgian Albums (Ultratop Flanders)	100
Belgian Alternative Albums (Ultratop Flanders)	42
Danish Albums (Hitlisten)	32
Dutch Albums (Album Top 100)	12
French Albums (SNEP)	17
German Albums (Offizielle Top 100)	24
Hungarian Albums (MAHASZ)	86
Italian Albums (FIMI)	31
Mexican Albums (Top 100 Mexico)	90
New Zealand Albums (RMNZ)	10
Polish Albums (ZPAV)	30
Spanish Albums (PROMUSICAE)	22
Swedish Albums (Sverigetopplistan)	67
Swiss Albums (Schweizer Hitparade)	33
UK Albums (OCC)	11
Worldwide Albums (IFPI)	11

Chart (2012)	Position
Australian Urban Albums (ARIA)	19
Austrian Albums (Ö3 Austria)	29
Belgian Albums (Ultratop Flanders)	38
Belgian Albums (Ultratop Wallonia)	64
Canadian Albums (Billboard)	20
Dutch Albums (Album Top 100)	42
French Albums (SNEP)	54
German Albums (Offizielle Top 100)	83
Hungarian Albums (MAHASZ)	64
Italian Albums (FIMI)	38
New Zealand Albums (RMNZ)	32
Russian Albums (2M)	23
Spanish Albums (PROMUSICAE)	24
Swedish Albums (Sverigetopplistan)	99
Swiss Albums (Schweizer Hitparade)	17
UK Albums (OCC)	66
US Billboard 200	65
US Top R&B/Hip-Hop Albums (Billboard)	9

Chart (2013)	Position
Australian Urban Albums (ARIA)	48

Chart (2015)	Position
Australian Urban Albums (ARIA)	47

=== Decade-end charts ===
Chart (2010–2019)	Position
UK Albums (OCC)	64

== Certifications and sales ==
Region	Certification	Certified units/sales
Australia (ARIA)	Platinum	70,000^{‡}
Austria (IFPI Austria)	Platinum	20,000^{*}
Belgium (BRMA)	Platinum	30,000^{*}
Brazil (Pro-Música Brasil)	Platinum	40,000^{*}
Colombia (ASINCOL)	Gold	
Denmark (IFPI Danmark)	Platinum	20,000^{^}
France	—	215,000
Germany (BVMI)	Platinum	200,000^{^}
Ireland (IRMA)	2× Platinum	30,000^{^}
Italy (FIMI)	Platinum	60,000^{*}
Mexico (AMPROFON)	Gold	30,000^{^}
New Zealand (RMNZ)	2× Platinum	30,000^{‡}
Poland (ZPAV)	Platinum	20,000^{*}
Portugal (AFP)	Platinum	15,000^{^}
Russia (NFPF)	Gold	5,000^{*}
Spain (Promusicae)	Platinum	40,000^{^}
Switzerland (IFPI Switzerland)	Platinum	30,000^{^}
United Kingdom (BPI)	3× Platinum	900,000^{‡}
Summaries
Europe (IFPI)	Platinum	1,000,000^{*}
^{*} Sales figures based on certification alone.^{^} Shipments figures based on certification alone.^{‡} Sales+streaming figures based on certification alone.

== Release history ==
Region	Date	Label	Ref.
Australia	2 December 2011	Universal	
Germany	2 December 2011	Universal	
Ireland	2 December 2011	Island; Lioness	
United Kingdom	5 December 2011	Island; Lioness	
France	5 December 2011	Universal	
Poland	5 December 2011	Universal	
Canada	6 December 2011	Universal	
Italy	6 December 2011	Universal	
United States	6 December 2011	Universal Republic	
Sweden	7 December 2011	Universal	
Japan	14 December 2011	Universal	
