= Back to Black (song) =

2007 single by Amy Winehouse

Single by Amy Winehouse

from the album Back to Black
- B-side: "Valerie"; "Hey Little Rich Girl"
- Released: 26 April 2007
- Studio: Daptone (New York City); Chung King (New York City); Metropolis (London)
- Genre: R&B; soul
- Length: 4:00
- Label: Island
- Songwriters: Amy Winehouse; Mark Ronson
- Producer: Mark Ronson

Amy Winehouse singles chronology
"You Know I'm No Good" (2007)	"Back to Black" (2007)	"Tears Dry on Their Own" (2007)

Audio sample
- file; help

Music video
- "Back to Black" on YouTube

"Back to Black" is a song by the English singer and songwriter Amy Winehouse, released on 26 April 2007 by Island Records as the third single from her second and final studio album of the same name (2006). The song was written by Winehouse and Mark Ronson, and produced by the latter. "Back to Black" was inspired by Winehouse's relationship with Blake Fielder-Civil, who had left her for an ex-girlfriend.

"Back to Black" received widespread acclaim from music critics, who generally praised Winehouse's lyrics and vocal performance, and its throwback sound to girl groups from the 1960s. It was included on several compiled year and decade-end lists of the best in music and was further considered to be one of Winehouse's signature songs. The single peaked at number eight on the UK Singles Chart in the United Kingdom and is Winehouse's third best-selling single in that country. Many artists recorded covers of the song; most notably, Beyoncé and André 3000 covered it for the soundtrack of the 2013 film adaptation of the novel The Great Gatsby (1925).

A documentary film based on the life and death of Winehouse, Amy (2015), features footage of Winehouse recording the song with Mark Ronson in March 2006. An a cappella version of the song was featured on the film's soundtrack.

== Background and composition ==
"Back to Black" was written by Amy Winehouse and Mark Ronson with the latter also serving as its producer. The track was recorded in three studios – Chung King Studios and Daptone Studios located in New York City and Metropolis Studios in London.

"Back to Black" was inspired by her relationship with Blake Fielder-Civil. He had left Winehouse for an ex-girlfriend, leaving her going to "black," which the listener may take to be drinking and depression. "Black" has sometimes been considered as a reference to heroin, but this is inaccurate as Winehouse's heroin use did not begin until after her later marriage to Fielder-Civil (May 2007), as confirmed in the Asif Kapadia documentary.

"Back to Black" is written in the key of D minor. The song explores elements of old school soul music. Its sound and beat have been described as similar to girl groups from the 1960s. Its production was noted for its Wall of Sound. Winehouse expresses feelings of hurt and bitterness for a boyfriend who has left her; however, throughout the lyrics she "remains strong" exemplified in the opening lines, "He left no time to regret, Kept his dick wet, With his same old safe bet, Me and my head high, And my tears dry, Get on without my guy". The song's lyrical content consists of a sad goodbye to a relationship with the lyrics being frank. Slant Magazine writer Sal Cinquemani suggested that the protagonist's lover may be committed to cocaine instead of another woman. John Murphy of musicOMH compared the song's introduction to the Martha and the Vandellas' "Jimmy Mack" (1967) – noting, that "Back to Black" goes to a "much darker place".

== Critical reception ==
"Back to Black" received universal critical acclaim. A writer from the website 4Music awarded the song ten stars out of ten in a review saying it was as good as the 1960s girl group classics that influenced it. The writer praised the "thoroughly modern Amy, who writes her own songs about love and sex and drugs and knows her own mind, but still gets hurt in a way only grown-ups can get hurt". Matt Harvey from BBC felt that the song owed to the "sonic heritage" of singers Phil Spector and Scott Walker and called it "a tortured monster of a track - Amy displaying the sort of vocal depth that Marc Almond has always dreamed of". AllMusic writer John Bush found universality in the song and opined that even Joss Stone could take it to the top of the music charts. Alex Denney from the website Drowned in Sound found "grit and gravitas" in Back to Black best shown in its title song with a "heart-stopping shuffle" and lyrics about a man's philander.

In 2007, the song was ranked number 39 on Popjustice's list of the year's best in music. Slant Magazine also mentioned it in their respective list of the best singles of the year, with Sal Cinquemani writing, "[It] is not only the singer's finest moment but producer Mark Ronson's as well". Writers of Rolling Stone magazine placed "Back to Black" at number 98 on their list of the 100 best songs of the '00s, praising Winehouse's trademark "stormily soulful" vocals and the updated sensibility, and prior to its 2021 article, the track is placed at number 79 on their lists of "500 Greatest Songs Of All Time." NME editors listed it at 61 on an eponomyous list for the magazine, writing that the song proved the album's real depth and added, "Hard faced and broken-souled, its knowing wallowing spoke to anyone who'd ever had a bunnyboiler moment". "Back to Black" was further considered one of Winehouse's signature songs. Justin Myers wrote for the Official Charts Company that it was the singer's most "anguished" song while also being "[h]eartbreakingly autobiographical". Tim Chester of NME also wrote that "Back to Black" was a song by which the singer should be remembered following her death, with Motown influence in her trademark vocal performance along with its powerful lyrics.

In July 2019 the song was the subject of the BBC Radio 4 programme Soul Music. The episode included contributions from Donald Brackett, the author of Back to Black: Amy Winehouse's Only Masterpiece.

== Commercial performance ==
Pre-release, the song charted in the UK Singles Chart on downloads alone for five consecutive weeks, peaking at number 40. The single charted at number 25 in 2007 once it had been released in physical format, which became its peak position in that country. The song has spent 34 non-consecutive weeks on the UK Singles Chart to date. It has re-entered with "Rehab" together on the chart. The song featured on BBC Radio 1's The B List Playlist during the week commencing 2 May. With sales of 96,000, "Back to Black" finished as the UK's 85th biggest-selling single of 2007. On 31 July 2011, following her death, the song re-entered the UK Singles Chart at 8, also giving the song a new peak position and second top ten hit in UK. As of September 2014, "Back to Black" has sold 340,000 copies in the UK and is Winehouse's third best-selling single in that country. In America, due to strong digital sales of the single over the years, "Back to Black" was certified platinum for over one million digital sales by the RIAA in January 2015.

== Music video ==
The music video was directed by Phil Griffin and features a funeral procession in which Winehouse mourns over a grave that reads "R.I.P. the Heart of Amy Winehouse". The shot of the headstone was edited out after the singer's death in 2011. The video was primarily shot near Gibson Gardens and Chesholm Road in Stoke Newington, London. The graveyard scenes were filmed at Abney Park Cemetery in northeast London. According to the official Winehouse website, "Amy's sultry new video for Back in Black [sic] is both beautifully and artistically shot in black-and-white and compares in imagery a doomed love affair with that of a funeral." At the 2007 Music of Black Origin Awards (MOBO), the music video was nominated for Best Video but lost to Kanye West's "Stronger" (2007). Myers of the Official Charts Company deemed the clip "super-sad" and felt it went further on the song's main theme of goodbye. As of October 2025, the video has over more than 1.3 billion views on YouTube.

== Track listings and formats ==
UK CD single

1. "Back to Black" – 4:00
2. "Valerie" (Jo Whiley Live Lounge) – 3:53
3. "Hey, Little Rich Girl" – 3:33
4. "Back to Black" (Video)

UK limited edition white 7" single

- Side A:
1. "Back to Black" – 4:00
- Side B:
1. "Back to Black" (The Rumble Strips Remix) – 3:48

UK 12" maxi single

- Side A:
1. "Back to Black" (Steve Mac Vocal) – 6:12
2. "Back to Black" (Steve Mac Smack Dub) – 6:15
- Side B:
1. "Back to Black" – 4:00
2. "Back to Black" (Mushtaq Vocal Remix) – 4:03

Digital single

1. "Back to Black" (Original Demo)

Digital download – Remixes & B-Sides EP (2015)

1. "Back to Black" (The Rumble Strips Remix) – 3:49
2. "Back to Black" (Mushtaq Vocal Remix) – 4:03
3. "Back to Black" (Original Demo) – 3:01
4. "Back to Black" (Vodafone Live at TBA) – 3:53
5. "Back to Black" (Steve Mac Vocal) – 6:03

== Credits ==
- Amy Winehouse – vocals, background vocals
- Mark Ronson – tambourine, band arrangements, production, recording
- Nick Movshon – bass guitar
- Homer Steinweiss – drums
- Thomas Brenneck – guitar
- Binky Griptite – guitar
- Victor Axelrod – piano
- Vaughan Merrick – claps, recording
- Perry Montague-Mason – violin, orchestra leader
- Chris Elliot – orchestral arrangements, orchestra conducting
- Isobel Griffiths – orchestra contractor
- Chris Tombling, Mark Berrow, Warren Zielenski, Liz Edwards, Boguslaw Kostecki, Peter Hanson, Jonathan Rees, Tom Pigott-Smith, Everton Nelson – violin
- Jon Thorne, Katie Wilkinson, Bruce White, Rachel Bolt – viola
- Anthony Pleeth, Joely Koos, John Heley – cello
- Andy Macintosh – alto saxophone
- Chris Davies – alto saxophone
- Jamie Talbot – tenor saxophone
- Dave Bishop – baritone saxophone
- Frank Ricotti – percussion
- Gabriel Roth – band arrangements
- Tom Elmhirst – mixing
- Dom Morley – recording engineering assistance
- Jesse Gladstone – recording assistance
- Mike Malowski – recording assistance
- Stuart Hawkes – mastering

== Charts ==
=== Weekly charts ===
2007–2008 weekly chart performance for "Back to Black"
Chart (2007–2008)	Peak position
Austria (Ö3 Austria Top 40)	3
Belgium (Ultratop 50 Flanders)	32
Belgium (Ultratip Bubbling Under Wallonia)	12
Czech Republic Airplay (ČNS IFPI)	79
Denmark (Tracklisten)	38
European Hot 100 Singles (Billboard)	69
Germany (GfK)	8
Greece (IFPI)	1
Ireland (IRMA)	33
Italy (FIMI)	12
Scottish Singles Sales (Official Charts)	20
Spain (Promusicae)	49
Switzerland (Schweizer Hitparade)	10
UK Singles (Official Charts)	25
UK Hip Hop/R&B (Official Charts)	5

2011–2026 weekly chart performance for "Back to Black"
Chart (2011–2026)	Peak position
Australia (ARIA)	56
Austria (Ö3 Austria Top 40)	23
Brazil Hot 100 (Billboard)	44
Canadian Digital Song Sales (Billboard)	59
Euro Digital Song Sales (Billboard)	8
France (SNEP)	15
Germany (GfK)	18
Global 200 (Billboard)	171
Greece International (IFPI)	18
Hungary (Single Top 40)	33
Ireland (IRMA)	11
Israel International Airplay (Media Forest)	6
Italy (FIMI)	3
Netherlands (Dutch Top 40)	18
Netherlands (Single Top 100)	18
Poland (Polish Streaming Top 100)	91
Portugal (AFP)	135
Scottish Singles Sales (Official Charts)	13
Spain (Promusicae)	10
Switzerland (Schweizer Hitparade)	8
UK Singles (Official Charts)	8
UK Hip Hop/R&B (Official Charts)	4
US Digital Song Sales (Billboard)	55
US R&B/Hip-Hop Digital Song Sales (Billboard)	19

=== Year-end charts ===
2007 year-end chart performance for "Back to Black"
Chart (2007)	Position
UK Singles (OCC)	85

2008 year-end chart performance for "Back to Black"
Chart (2008)	Position
Austria (Ö3 Austria Top 40)	13
European Hot 100 Singles (Billboard)	97
Germany (Official German Charts)	48
Switzerland (Schweizer Hitparade)	33
UK Singles (OCC)	165

2011 year-end chart performance for "Back to Black"
Chart (2011)	Position
Italy (Musica e dischi)	76

2024 year-end chart performance for "Back to Black"
Chart (2024)	Position
France (SNEP)	118

== Certifications ==
Certifications and sales for "Back to Black"
Region	Certification	Certified units/sales
Australia (ARIA)	6× Platinum	420,000^{‡}
Brazil (Pro-Música Brasil)	Diamond	250,000^{‡}
Denmark (IFPI Danmark)	Platinum	90,000^{‡}
Germany (BVMI)	3× Gold	450,000^{‡}
Italy sales in 2007	—	65,000
Italy (FIMI) sales since 2009	2× Platinum	100,000^{‡}
New Zealand (RMNZ)	3× Platinum	90,000^{‡}
Portugal (AFP)	3× Platinum	75,000^{‡}
Spain (Promusicae)	3× Platinum	180,000^{‡}
Spain (Promusicae) Ringtone	Gold	10,000^{*}
Switzerland (IFPI Switzerland)	Platinum	30,000^{^}
United Kingdom (BPI)	4× Platinum	2,400,000^{‡}
United States (RIAA)	Platinum	1,000,000^{‡}
Streaming
Greece (IFPI Greece)	4× Platinum	8,000,000^{†}
^{*} Sales figures based on certification alone.^{^} Shipments figures based on certification alone.^{‡} Sales+streaming figures based on certification alone.^{†} Streaming-only figures based on certification alone.

== Release history ==
Release dates and formats for "Back to Black"
Region	Date	Format(s)	Label(s)	Ref.
United Kingdom	26 April 2007	7-inch vinyl	Island	
United Kingdom	30 April 2007	12-inch vinyl; maxi CD	Island	
United States	27 November 2007	Rhythmic contemporary radio	Universal Republic	
Germany	7 March 2008	CD	Universal Music	

== Other versions ==
- Lightspeed Champion included a cover of this song as a B-side to their 2008 single "Tell Me What It's Worth". His version was a stripped-down rendition, from a different gender perspective. Priya Elan of NME considered his cover to be one of the best covers by a song by Winehouse classifiying it as "suitably distraught and heartbroken".
- "Back to Black" was covered thrice on the Live Lounge segment of BBC Radio 1's The Jo Whiley Show, first by Elbow on 5 June 2008 and later by both Glasvegas on 1 September 2008 and Sam Fender on 13 February 2020. Elbow's version contained a string accompaniment which backed the lead singer's vocals. Fender's rendition was later released digitally to music streaming services on 26 March 2020.
- The song appeared on French singer Amanda Lear's 2009 album, Brief Encounters. The cover was also released as a single on 13 December 2012 containing three versions of the song; the album version, an acoustic version and a "Dance Amanda's Vino Della Casa Mix". The writers of the website Idolator, described her cover as "one of the strangest Amy Winehouse covers".
- On 29 July 2011, during a performance at I Want My MTV Ibiza, Mark Ronson covered "Back to Black" with Charlie Waller as a tribute to Winehouse, several days after her death. He revealed that the song was one of the first songs they had written together. He also told the crowd that Waller's inclusion for the performance was due to Winehouse's positive reaction after hearing his cover of "Back to Black" with the Rumble Strips. A writer of MTV UK praised his performance, saying that it was sending "a tingle down the spine and causing the hairs on the back of your neck to stand on end".
- Ronnie Spector, who was a major influence on Winehouse, began covering "Back to Black" during concerts in 2008 and released her cover as a single in tribute to Winehouse in 2011.
- "Back to Black" was performed by English singer Florence Welch during the VH1 Divas concert at Hammerstein Ballroom on 18 December 2011 in New York City. Welch performed the song as a tribute to Winehouse after her death. Mark Graham of VH1 praised Welch's performance of the song, noting that thanks to it Winehouse's musical legacy was cemented.
- On 25 June 2012, Ronson played a previously unheard and unmastered version of the song on BBC Radio 6.
- "Back to Black" was performed by Ronson and Miley Cyrus during the Glastonbury Festival 2019.
- In 2020, New Zealand singer Benee covered the song as part of Deezer's InVersions compilation album.

== Beyoncé and André 3000 version ==
"Back to Black"

Song by Beyoncé featuring André 3000

from the album The Great Gatsby: Music from Baz Luhrmann's Film
- Released: 6 May 2013
- Recorded: 2012–2013
- Genre: Alternative R&B
- Length: 3:21
- Label: Interscope
- Songwriters: Amy Winehouse; Mark Ronson
- Producer: Hollywood Holt

"Back to Black" was covered by American singer Beyoncé and American rapper André 3000 for the soundtrack of the 2013 film The Great Gatsby. Jay Z, who served as an executive producer for the soundtrack, suggested the song to its producer Baz Luhrmann. It was the final song recorded for the album and was included after the producers wanted a darker moment on The Great Gatsby: Music from Baz Luhrmann's Film. The song premiered in April 2013 after several snippets of it appeared online and it was used in the trailer for the film.

Amy Winehouse's father Mitchell Winehouse reported that Beyoncé had not informed him about covering the song, and requested that the income coming from it should be donated to his Amy Winehouse Foundation. When the song was released, Winehouse criticized André 3000's singing, saying that it should have been covered only by Beyoncé. However, Mark Ronson, the original producer of the song, revealed that he was flattered and honored by the cover version.

Beyoncé and André 3000's cover is slower than the original with several lyrical modifications. It features a darker production with heavier instrumentation complete with a guitar and synthesizers, chopped and screwed elements and electronic beats. Upon its release, the song received mixed reviews from music critics who noted that the original version was already perfect to be further reworked; several critics praised its reworked arrangement while others criticized the singers' vocal performance, calling it the most controversial song on the soundtrack.

=== Background and development ===
On 1 April 2013 E! Online announced that American singer Beyoncé would cover the song with André 3000 for The Great Gatsby soundtrack, set to be released on 7 May 2013. Baz Luhrmann, the director of the film, revealed that "Back to Black" was the final song to be included on the album. The song was suggested for the soundtrack by Beyoncé's husband and rapper Jay Z, who also served as its executive producer. "We were looking for, 'How do we have a darker moment?' and he said have a listen to this and he played it", commented Luhrmann, who, after a few spins, confirmed it should appear on the album. Anton Monsted, who served as a producer for the soundtrack, talked about the placement of the cover of "Back to Black" on the track listing during an interview with The Hollywood Reporter:

We have to thank Jay Z for bringing this into the overall thinking. He worked with us on the second party in the movie. The first party is a gaudy, rich, Venus flytrap of a celebration designed to attract Daisy's interest by physically bringing the entire city of New York to Long Island. The second party is one that Daisy does attend, but at this point in the story, we were looking for a musical direction that alluded to darker things beneath the surface. We were looking for a song that would speak to the almost 'Sid and Nancy' addictive love that Gatsby and Daisy have found themselves re-engaging in. Everybody knows the Amy Winehouse version of this song, and I think this is a very interesting interpretation. It plunges you further into this particular kind of lovesickness. I think it works very well in the film, where it blends between a jazz recording that The Bryan Ferry Orchestra did and the version on the album with Beyoncé and André 3000. That combination helps to deepen the resonance of what the song is telling us.

On 2 April 2013, Amy Winehouse's father, Mitchell Winehouse, used his Twitter profile to reveal that Beyoncé had not informed him of her plans to cover the song and that he wanted income from the song to go to his Amy Winehouse Foundation. He wrote, "I don't know about this but what if Beyoncé gave £100,000 to the foundation? Do you know how many kids that would help? Just putting it out there." He later added, "Let me repeat. This is the first I have heard of Beyoncé doing Amy's [sic] song." Kia Makarechi of The Huffington Post noted that Beyoncé did not use the song as a personal record and thus it was "slightly curious" for Winehouse to request for her to pay out. Winehouse later tweeted, "I like Beyoncé's cover and have no probs." However, upon hearing the full-length track, he wrote on his Twitter profile, "I just heard the André part of 'Back to Black'. Terrible. He should have let Beyoncé do it all."

=== Release ===
On 4 April 2013 a new trailer for the film featured previews of three songs from the soundtrack; a thirty-second preview of the cover of "Back to Black" was among those songs. Chris Payne of Billboard magazine praised the cover, which according to him was made unique with the downtempo and EDM wobble. A ninety-second snippet of the song also appeared online on 21 April 2013 and was made available for streaming through the iTunes Store. The full version of the song premiered on Mark Ronson's East Village Radio show on 26 April 2013. Upon its release, Ronson, who co-wrote the original song, commented that it was a "wonderful take on our song" and added: "I'm flattered and I know Amy would be too."

=== Composition ===
The cover version of "Back to Black" has a slower tempo than the original. It features a darker production and chopped and screwed elements with a dark, twisted mood and a hypnotizing dub beat. Charley Rogulewski of Vibe magazine commented that the cover version was like a heroin-laced outtake off of the Trainspotting soundtrack. Eschewing the 1960s Wall of Sound style of the original, the remake takes a minimalist, synth-heavy approach, with an occasional, echoing guitar twang. Melinda Newman of the website HitFix noted that the cover version was more solemn than the original, with the guitar in the song "adding to the loneliness". Logan Smithson of the online magazine PopMatters commented that it also features heavier instrumentation. The 1960s pop string orchestration of the first version is exchanged for a "meatier, keyboard-fueled, big beat groove", as stated by Keith Murphy of Vibe magazine. Glenn Gamboa of Newsday noted that the cover was stripped down practically to an electronic pulse which he further compared with the "sweeping, dramatic, icy electronic music" that Luhrmann used in his film Romeo + Juliet.

The lyrics of the song were modified; they were reversed so it could function better as a duet. It opens with André 3000 rapping his verses on a scratchy, bare beat and dissonant instrumentation further playing with the rhythm of the lyrical phrasing. Beyoncé continues singing her part at the first minute and thirty seconds of the song. Instead of belting her verse out, she whispers with seductive and sultry vocals, while André 3000 "buzzes" and raps over a nostalgic Aquemini leaky faucet beat as stated by Rogulewski from Vibe. Newman of the website HitFix commented that Beyoncé's vocal performance contrasted André 3000's spoken lyrics.

=== Critical reception ===
Upon its release, the collaboration of "Back to Black" received mixed reviews by music critics. Critics discussed that the song was already "perfect" to be reworked. Describing the cover as "distinguishable", Logan Smithson of PopMatters commented, "Though the cover doesn't top Winehouse's original, it is good in its own right and feels right at home on Gatsby. Besides, who doesn't love hearing André 3000's voice?". Kelly Dearmore from the American Songwriter described the cover as "synthy [and] trippy", writing that the singers turn it into a "wondrously hypnotic effect".

AllMusic's David Jeffries however called the song an "icy cold reading" of the original. Noting that it had a "lavish-yet-empty feeling", Aisha Harris from Slate magazine wrote in her review: "The song has the feel of a blurry stupor—fitting... for the dark undertones of The Great Gatsby, but not terribly satisfying outside that context. Winehouse's vocals had a visceral, emotional punch, whereas here, there's little connection between the sound of the voices and the meaning of the lyrics. 'Life is like a pipe/ And I'm a tiny penny rolling up the walls inside' doesn't feel as meaningful coming from Beyoncé as it did from Winehouse." Thomas Conner from the Chicago Sun-Times wrote that Beyoncé surprises by downshifting into "indie-chanteuse mode" for the cover, which he noted "approaches a torch song but never ignites it". Newman from the website HitFix wrote in her review that the original version was much stronger than the cover and added that it felt like it was a song by André 3000 featuring Beyoncé as the song mainly featured his vocals. She finished her review by grading the cover with a B-side and wrote, "André 3000 and Beyoncé aren't afraid to rework the track and make it their own, but their remake won't make anyone forget Amy's version." Jim Farber of New York Daily News wrote in his review that "unfortunately" Beyoncé only makes a cameo appearance in the song while André 3000 dominates with a "rank rap and a woeful vocal". Writing that it sounded "dull", Cameron Adams of Herald Sun added: "it's got nice guitar work but the minimal remake is worth it only to hear Beyoncé sing, 'I love blow and you love puff'". Paste magazine's Philip Cosores wrote that "'Back to Black' sees Jay Z sticking his wife with a pretty raw deal, with the male half of the duet getting the opening verse and the chorus virtually to himself, leaving her with scraps at the end."

Mark Beech from Bloomberg L.P. gave a negative review of the cover, writing that Beyoncé and André 3000 "murdered" the original version and noted that F. Scott Fitzgerald, the author of the novel The Great Gatsby on which the film was based, would be "baffled" by it. Kathy McCabe from The Daily Telegraph wrote that the song was the most controversial musical moment from the soundtrack and added that it seemed "unrecognisable from the original, darker and so cut and pasted, it gives you the jitters after a couple of minutes". Keith Murphy of Vibe magazine described the cover version as the soundtrack's "weakest link". He added that Beyoncé sounds "way too pristine" on it and wrote, "Please avoid covering the late Amy Winehouse if you are unable to project her heartbreaking anguish." Stacy Lambe of VH1 panned the cover of "Back to Black" as "the biggest disappointment on the soundtrack". Another writer of the same website also gave it a negative review, saying "I think the arrangement of this is sleepy and practically smothers the angst out of the song. Also, Beyoncé can't convey the same bitter pain in her voice that Amy could."
