= Amy Winehouse Foundation =

UK registered charity

- Amy Winehouse Foundation logo (2011–present)
- Formation: 14 September 2011
- Type: Charity
- Legal status: Foundation
- Purpose: Drug & Alcohol Addiction, Mental Health Issues
- Location(s): London, N12; United Kingdom
- Official language: English
- Leader: Mitchell Winehouse
- Website: amywinehousefoundation.org

The Amy Winehouse Foundation is a registered charity in England and Wales (number 1143740), set up in memory of English singer-songwriter Amy Winehouse (1983–2011).

After Amy Winehouse's death, on 23 July 2011 from alcohol poisoning at the age of 27, the foundation was set up by Winehouse's family and launched on 14 September 2011 (which would have been Winehouse's 28th birthday). Its aim is to help vulnerable or disadvantaged young people and it works with other charitable organisations to provide frontline support. Its central office is in North London, but it also has an office in New York (operating under the name 'The Amy Winehouse Foundation US'). Jon Snow and Mark Ronson are patrons for the charity, and ambassadors include Jess Glynne, Kiera Chaplin and Mica Paris. The late Barbara Windsor was also a patron.

== Focus ==
The Foundation's work focuses on three core areas:

1. To inform and educate young people about the effects of drug and alcohol misuse, as well as to support those seeking help for their problems and those needing on-going support in their recovery
2. To provide support for those most vulnerable, including those who are disadvantaged through circumstance or at high risk of substance misuse.
3. To support the personal development of disadvantaged young people through music.

The Foundation was established with royalties from the sales of 2011's Lioness: Hidden Treasures album (with £1 per album going to the charity), and also the sales of Amy - My Daughter, a biography of Winehouse written by her father, Mitch Winehouse. As of 2012/13, the charity relies on donations from the general public and fundraising events to continue its work. Such events include the auction of the iconic polka dot chiffon dress worn by Winehouse on the cover of her critically acclaimed second album Back to Black, with a winning bid of £36,000.

== The Amy Winehouse Resilience Programme ==
On 12 March 2013, the Foundation launched the Amy Winehouse Foundation Resilience Programme For Schools with the help of ex-addict Russell Brand. The programme aims to provide effective education around drugs, alcohol and dealing with emotional issues to secondary schools across the UK. On 4 June 2013, the Mayor of Camden Town, Jonathan Simpson, wrote an article for the Huffington Post in support of the programme.

== Amy's Yard ==
One of the Amy Winehouse Foundations' main areas of focus is "to support the personal development of disadvantaged young people through music". Since the Foundation began it has had many talented young people who are held back by not being able to access professional studio time due to the costs and lack of provision. The Foundation therefore decided to develop Amy's studio and share it with some of the young people from the partner organizations it works with.

On 14 September 2015 (which would have been Winehouse's 32nd birthday), the Amy Winehouse Foundation released their first album Amy's Yard - The Sessions: Volume 1 in partnership with Island Records. The album features tracks completed by young artists who have been involved within "Amy's Yard Programme".

== Patrons ==
- Barbara Windsor (until 2020)
- Jon Snow
- Mark Ronson
- Nas
- Monte Lipman

== Trustees ==
- Mitchell Winehouse
- Janis Winehouse
- Jane Winehouse
- Richard Collins
- Jonathan Simpson
- Barry Yin
- Yogesh Dewan
- Professor Stephen Lee
- Michael Winehouse
- Melissa Rice

== Events ==
Since its launch on 14 September 2011, the Amy Winehouse Foundation have done a series of events on every birthday of Amy Winehouse. In 2013 (when it would have been Winehouse's 30th birthday), the charity celebrated the birthday by doing an exhibition at the Jewish Museum in Camden Town, creating a shop that was for a limited amount of time, named Amy's Pop-Up Shop in Camden Town, a picture gallery entitled as For You I Was A Flame at the Proud Gallery and various performances took place from people involved with the foundation.

In 2014, a Statue of Amy Winehouse was unveiled at Stables Market in Camden Town, done by Scott Eaton. Winehouse's parents Mitch and Janis were in attendance for the event, as well as Winehouse's friend, Barbara Windsor.

In 2015, an album was released on Winehouse's birthday, entitled as Amy's Yard - The Sessions: Volume 1. The project sees young people with a musical talent mentored to become self-sustaining music artists. They are given time in Amy's own studio and are guided by producer Urban Monk who has worked with the likes of Giggs, Wiley, Plan B, Ghetts, Lily Allen and Mr Hudson.
