= Tears Dry on Their Own =

2007 single by Amy Winehouse

Single by Amy Winehouse

from the album Back to Black
- B-side: "You're Wondering Now"
- Released: 13 August 2007
- Studio: Instrument Zoo (Miami)
- Genre: Pop; soul
- Length: 3:05
- Label: Island
- Songwriters: Amy Winehouse; Nickolas Ashford; Valerie Simpson
- Producer: Salaam Remi

Amy Winehouse singles chronology
"Back to Black" (2007)	"Tears Dry on Their Own" (2007)	"Valerie" (2007)

Amy Winehouse U.S. singles chronology
"Rehab" (2007)	"Tears Dry on Their Own" (2007)	"Back to Black" (2007)

Music video
- "Tears Dry on Their Own" on YouTube

"Tears Dry on Their Own" is a song by the English singer and songwriter Amy Winehouse from her second and final studio album, Back to Black (2006). It was released on 13 August 2007 as the album's fourth single. While the melody and lyrics are composed by Winehouse, the music behind her voice is an interpolation of Marvin Gaye and Tammi Terrell's 1967 song "Ain't No Mountain High Enough", penned by Ashford & Simpson. The original ballad version of the track is featured on the posthumous album Lioness: Hidden Treasures (2011). The song was featured in the documentary film based on the life and death of Winehouse, Amy (2015) and was also included on the film's soundtrack.

In October 2023, Skepta released "Can't Play Myself (A Tribute to Amy)", which samples "Tears Dry on Their Own".

In August 2026, an alternative demo of "Tears Dry on Their Own", titled "Tears Dry (Alternative Demo)", was released on streaming platforms and as a visualiser on YouTube, created by artist João Pombeiro. On 23 October 2026, the recording was included on the 20th anniversary expanded edition of Back To Black, alongside other demos and alternative versions of songs from the album, offering an additional version of the track from the album's recording period.

== Composition ==
"Tears Dry on Their Own" has been described by NME as a "Motown-influenced pop song", while Billy Hamilton of Drowned in Sound believed the song to be a soul song. The song was originally written in the key of E major.

== Music video ==
Tears Dry on Their Own's music video was shot in Los Angeles, and directed by David LaChapelle on 22 May 2007. Featuring Winehouse making her way down Hollywood Blvd and in a dim motel room, the video features the Grand Motel at 1479 S La Cienega Blvd, in Los Angeles. The hotel room is a nod to the ones she would stay in while waiting for her to-be-husband, Blake Fielder-Civil to arrive. The music video for this song was the second to last filmed before Winehouse's death on 23 July 2011.

== Chart performance ==
"Tears Dry on Their Own" became Winehouse's fourth consecutive single to chart inside the top 40 of the UK Singles Chart, when it entered at number 37 on 5 August 2007. It also became her eighth UK R&B top 40 hit. The single spent four weeks at number one on the UK Airplay Chart during August. After the song's physical release, the single climbed into the top 20, peaking at number 16. Therefore, "Tears Dry on Their Own" is Winehouse's second highest-charting single behind "Rehab" and the fourth consecutive top 30 hit from her second album. To date, it has spent 19 non-consecutive weeks on the UK Singles Chart, making it her fourth longest-running hit behind "Rehab" (57 weeks), "Valerie" (39 weeks), and "Back to Black" (34 weeks).

With sales of 84,750, "Tears Dry on Their Own" went on to become the UK's 93rd best-selling single of 2007.

On 31 July 2011, the song re-entered the UK Singles Chart at 27 after Winehouse's death.

== Track listings and formats ==
UK CD single

1. "Tears Dry on Their Own" – 3:09
2. "You're Wondering Now" – 2:31
3. "Tears Dry on Their Own" (Alix Alvarez Sole Channel Mix) – 6:42
4. "Tears Dry on Their Own" (Al Usher Remix) – 7:00
5. "Tears Dry on Their Own" (Video)

UK limited edition clear 7" single

- Side A:
1. "Tears Dry on Their Own" – 3:05
- Side B:
1. "Tears Dry on Their Own" (NYPC's Fucked Mix) – 4:39

UK 12" single

- Side A:
1. "Tears Dry on Their Own" (Alix Alvarez Sole Channel Mix) – 6:42
- Side B:
1. "Tears Dry on Their Own" (Al Usher Remix) – 7:00
2. "Tears Dry on Their Own" – 3:05

Digital download – Remixes & B-Sides EP (2015)

1. "Tears Dry on Their Own" (Vodafone Live at TBA) – 3:23
2. "Tears Dry on Their Own" (Alix Alvarez Sole Channel Mix) – 5:35
3. "Tears Dry on Their Own" (NYPC's Fucked Mix) – 4:39
4. "Tears Dry on Their Own" (Al Usher Remix) – 6:59
5. "Tears Dry on Their Own" (Kardinal Beats Remix) – 3:21

== Official versions and remixes ==
- Album Version – 3:05
- Al Usher Remix – 7:00
- Alix Alvarez Sole Channel Mix – 6:42
- Kardinal Beats Remix – 3:20
- NYPC's Fucked Mix – 4:39
- Original Version – 4:09

== Personnel ==
"Tears Dry on Their Own"

- Recorded by Franklin Socorro
- Mixed by Tom Elmhirst
- Producer – Salaam Remi
- Recorded by Gleyder "Gee" Disla, Shomari "Sho" Dillon
- Bass, piano, guitar – Salaam Remi
- Written by Amy Winehouse
- Drums, tambourine – Troy Auxilly-Wilson
- Mixed by Matt Paul
- Trumpet (bass), trumpet, flugelhorn – Bruce Purse
- Saxophone (baritone, tenor and alto), flute, clarinet, piano, celesta (celeste), guitar – Vincent Henry
- Backing vocals – Amy Winehouse

"You're Wondering Now"

- Recorded by Jon Moon
- Featuring – Ade*, Zalon*
- Written by Nickolas Ashford and Valerie Simpson*, Clement Dodd

== Charts ==
=== Weekly charts ===
Chart (2007–2008)	Peak position
Belgium (Ultratip Bubbling Under Flanders)	3
Belgium (Ultratip Bubbling Under Wallonia)	15
Europe (European Hot 100 Singles)	49
Germany (GfK)	56
Hungary (Dance Top 40)	38
Ireland (IRMA)	26
Netherlands (Tipparade)	14
Scottish Singles Sales (Official Charts)	17
Sweden (Sverigetopplistan)	24
UK Singles (Official Charts)	16
UK Hip Hop/R&B (Official Charts)	6
US Adult R&B Songs (Billboard)	40

Chart (2011)	Peak position
Belgium Back Catalogue Singles (Ultratop Flanders)	8
Belgium Back Catalogue Singles (Ultratop Wallonia)	23
France (SNEP)	87
Germany (GfK)	81
Ireland (IRMA)	44
Netherlands (Single Top 100)	100
Scottish Singles Sales (Official Charts)	32
UK Singles (Official Charts)	27
UK Hip Hop/R&B (Official Charts)	11

Chart (2016)	Peak position
UK Singles Downloads (Official Charts)	84

Chart (2024)	Peak position
UK Singles Downloads (Official Charts)	93
UK Singles (Official Charts)	49

=== Year-end charts ===
Chart (2007)	Position
UK Singles (Official Charts Company)	93

== Certifications ==
Region	Certification	Certified units/sales
Australia (ARIA)	3× Platinum	210,000^{‡}
Brazil (Pro-Música Brasil)	Diamond	250,000^{‡}
Denmark (IFPI Danmark)	Gold	45,000^{‡}
Italy (FIMI)	Gold	50,000^{‡}
New Zealand (RMNZ)	2× Platinum	60,000^{‡}
Spain (Promusicae)	Gold	30,000^{‡}
United Kingdom (BPI)	3× Platinum	1,800,000^{‡}
^{‡} Sales+streaming figures based on certification alone.
