= Love Is a Losing Game =

2007 single by Amy Winehouse

Single by Amy Winehouse

from the album Back to Black
- Released: 7 December 2007 (Ireland); 10 December 2007 (UK)
- Recorded: 2006
- Studio: Daptone (New York City); Chung King (New York City); Metropolis (London)
- Genre: Blue-eyed soul
- Length: 2:35
- Label: Island
- Songwriter: Amy Winehouse
- Producer: Mark Ronson

Amy Winehouse singles chronology
"Valerie" (2007)	"Love Is a Losing Game" (2007)	"B Boy Baby" (2007)

Music video
- "Love Is a Losing Game" on YouTube

"Love Is a Losing Game" is a song written and performed by the English singer Amy Winehouse from her second and final studio album Back to Black (2006). It was chosen as the fifth and final single from Back to Black and was also the final single released in Winehouse's lifetime. The song was added to BBC Radio 1's playlist on 7 November 2007. It was released as a single on 10 December in the United Kingdom.

== Release and response ==
George Michael named the song as one of his eight choices on the Radio 4 programme Desert Island Discs. When asked which of his eight choices he would pick if he had to choose one, he opted for "Love Is a Losing Game". Prince began performing the song live, and he sent an invitation to Winehouse. On 21 September 2007, Winehouse joined Prince at the final aftershow of his 21-gig marathon at The O2, and they performed the song together.

The song was the lowest-charting of Winehouse's Back to Black singles, peaking at number 46 on the UK Singles Chart and spending four weeks on the UK Top 100. Following her death, the song re-entered the chart, reaching a new peak of 33.

Winehouse performed "Love Is a Losing Game" live when she appeared at the 2007 Mercury Prize. She later performed it at the 2008 BRIT Awards. The song won the award for Best Song Musically and Lyrically at the 2008 Ivor Novello Awards on 22 May 2008, Winehouse's third award at the event.

Sam Smith recorded a cover of the song on the 2014 album In the Lonely Hour (Drowning Shadows Edition).

A documentary film biopic, directed by film maker Asif Kapadia was released; that depicts the life and death of Winehouse, entitled Amy (2015). Winehouse's performance of the single at the Mercury Prize in 2007 was included in the film and was also featured on the original soundtrack.

A recording of Winehouse's original demo of the song is available on the Back to Black deluxe edition bonus disc. Winehouse sings the demo accompanied only by her guitar. On completion, asks the engineer whether it is a good take.

== Music video ==
Two alternate music videos were released: the first is a montage video, which includes photographs of Winehouse alongside live performance clips of the song, and the second is an entirely live video, taken from her I Told You I Was Trouble live performance DVD.

== Track listing ==
CD

1. "Love Is a Losing Game" – 2:35
2. "Love Is a Losing Game" (Kardinal Beats remix) – 3:22
3. "Love Is a Losing Game" (Moody Boyz Original Ruffian Badboy remix) – 7:12
4. "Love Is a Losing Game" (Truth and Soul remix) – 3:55
5. "Love Is a Losing Game" (enhanced video) – 2:35

== Awards ==
Year	Award	Category	Title	Result
2008	Ivor Novello Awards	Best Song Musically and Lyrically	"Love Is a Losing Game"	Won

== Charts ==
Chart (2007–2008)	Peak position
Belgium (Ultratip Bubbling Under Flanders)	16
Scottish Singles Sales (Official Charts)	31
UK Singles (Official Charts)	46
UK Hip Hop/R&B (Official Charts)	6

Chart (2011)	Peak position
Ireland (IRMA)	33
Netherlands (Single Top 100)	88
Scottish Singles Sales (Official Charts)	41
UK Singles (Official Charts)	33
UK Hip Hop/R&B (Official Charts)	15

== Certifications ==
Region	Certification	Certified units/sales
Brazil (Pro-Música Brasil)	2× Platinum	120,000^{‡}
Denmark (IFPI Danmark)	Gold	45,000^{‡}
Italy (FIMI)	Gold	15,000^{‡}
New Zealand (RMNZ)	Platinum	30,000^{‡}
Spain (Promusicae)	Gold	30,000^{‡}
United Kingdom (BPI)	Platinum	600,000^{‡}
^{‡} Sales+streaming figures based on certification alone.

== Media usage ==
- The song was used in the first part of the episode "Coup de Grace" of the BBC series Silent Witness.
