= Lioness Records =

British vanity record label founded by Amy Winehouse

- Founded: 2009
- Founder: Amy Winehouse
- Status: Active
- Genre: Soul; blue-eyed soul; neo soul; rhythm and blues; jazz
- Country of origin: UK
- Location: London
- Official website: lionessrecords.com

Lioness Records is a British record label, founded in 2009 by British singer Amy Winehouse. Winehouse stated she was inspired by Berry Gordy's Motown Records, and The Specials' 2 Tone Records to create her own label.

== Formation ==
Lioness Records was formed in 2009, due to Winehouse's wish of signing Dionne Bromfield. Winehouse stated that "the first time I heard Dionne sing, I couldn't believe what I was hearing, such an amazing voice from such a young cat. She’s so much better than I was at her age. I'm just so proud of her". The name Lioness Records comes from a necklace, given to Winehouse from her grandmother, Cynthia, bearing a pendant featuring a lioness. Winehouse died in 2011, although her father, Mitchell Winehouse, has remained an active director.

== Roster ==
Act	Year signed	Lioness Records Albums
Dionne Bromfield	2009	2
Juliette Ashby	2010	—
Liam Bailey	2010	1
Zalon	2011	—

== Release history ==
=== Albums ===
Year	Information	UK
2009	Dionne Bromfield – Introducing Dionne Bromfield: Released: 12 October 2009; Singles: "Mama Said", "Ain't No Mountain High Enough"; BPI certification: (uncertified)	33
2011	Dionne Bromfield – Good for the Soul: Released: 4 July 2011; Singles: "Yeah Right", "Foolin'"; BPI certification: (uncertified)	7
2011	Liam Bailey – Out of the Shadows: Released: 12 September 2011; Singles: "It's Not the Same"; BPI certification: (uncertified)	—
"—" denotes a title that did not chart, or was not released in that territory.

=== Singles ===
==== 2010s ====
Release date	Artist	Title	UK	Hungary	Bulgaria Top 40
17 October 2011	Dionne Bromfield	"Ouch"	—	—	—
23 September 2011	Dionne Bromfield	"Spinnin For 2012"	—	—	—
30 July 2011	Liam Bailey	"It's Not the Same"	—	—	—
17 June 2011	Dionne Bromfield	"Foolin"	—	—	7
21 February 2011	Dionne Bromfield	"Yeah Right"	36	20	36
"—" denotes a title that did not chart, or was not released in that territory.

==== 2000s ====
Release date	Artist	Title	UK
20 December 2009	Dionne Bromfield	"Ain't No Mountain High Enough"	—
1 November 2009	Dionne Bromfield	"Mama Said"	43
"—" denotes a title that did not chart, or was not released in that territory.
