= Introducing Dionne Bromfield =

Studio album by Dionne Bromfield
- Released: 12 October 2009
- Recorded: 2009
- Genre: R&B
- Length: 32:58
- Label: Lioness

Dionne Bromfield chronology
| Introducing Dionne Bromfield (2009) | Good for the Soul (2011) |

Singles from Introducing Dionne Bromfield
- 1. "Mama Said" Released: 1 November 2009; 2. "Ain't No Mountain High Enough" Released: 20 December 2009

Professional ratings
Review scores
| Source | Rating |
|---|---|
| Allmusic | 3/5 stars |

Introducing Dionne Bromfield is the debut album by British singer Dionne Bromfield. She recorded it when she was thirteen for Lioness Records, the label of her godmother, Amy Winehouse.

The album was released on 12 October 2009 and reached number 33 on the UK album charts. Bromfield released "Mama Said" and "Ain't No Mountain High Enough" as singles. She performed on Strictly Come Dancing with Winehouse on backing vocals, at the Young Voices concert at the M.E.N. Arena in 2009, and at the O2 Arena in 2011.

== Singles ==
Although not officially released as a single, a video for Dionne's cover of "Foolish Little Girl" was released 23 September 2009.

Dionne's debut single, her cover of The Shirelles' song "Mama Said", was released 1 November 2009. The EP consists of the album version, Vito Benito remix and a b-side, "Dancing in the Street." The music video was released 14 October 2009.

Her second single, "Ain't No Mountain High Enough," was released 20 December 2009. Both that music video and a promotional video for its b-side "I Saw Mummy Kissing Santa Claus" were released 4 December 2009.

== Track listing ==
| No. | Title | Length |
|---|---|---|
| 1. | "Tell Him" | 2:51 |
| 2. | "Mama Said" | 2:24 |
| 3. | "Foolish Little Girl" | 2:24 |
| 4. | "My Boy Lollipop" | 2:28 |
| 5. | "Beachwood 45789" | 2:09 |
| 6. | "Two Can Have a Party" | 2:56 |
| 7. | "He's So Fine" | 3:16 |
| 8. | "With a Child's Heart" | 2:07 |
| 9. | "Until You Come Back to Me" | 3:25 |
| 10. | "Ain't No Mountain High Enough (feat. Zalon)" | 2:46 |
| 11. | "Am I the Same Girl" | 3:28 |
| 12. | "Oh Henry" | 2:44 |

== Charts ==
| Chart (2009) | Peak position |
|---|---|
| UK Albums Chart | 33 |

== Release history ==
| Region | Date | Label | Format |
|---|---|---|---|
| United Kingdom | 12 October 2009 | Lioness / Island | CD, digital download |
| Brazil | 9 January 2012 | Universal Records | CD, digital download |
