= Amy Winehouse: Back to Black =

- DVD cover
- Directed by: Jeremy Marre
- Starring: Amy Winehouse (archive footage); Mark Ronson; Salaam Remi; Tom Elmhirst; Darcus Beese
- Music by: Amy Winehouse
- Country of origin: United Kingdom
- Original language: English

Production
- Producer: Jeremy Marre
- Editor: Sheryl Sandler
- Running time: 91 minutes
- Production companies: BBC Studios; Eagle Rock Films

Original release
- Network: BBC Four
- Release: 14 September 2018

Amy Winehouse: Back to Black is a 2018 documentary film about English singer Amy Winehouse and the making of her second studio album, Back to Black (2006). It contains new interviews, as well as archive footage.

Directed by Jeremy Marre, the film was first broadcast on BBC Four on 14 September 2018 (on what would have been Winehouse's 35th birthday) as part of the Classic Albums documentary series. It was released on DVD, Blu-ray and digitally on 2 November 2018 by Eagle Vision.

The film is accompanied by An Intimate Evening in London, featuring footage of a performance by Winehouse at Riverside Studios in London in February 2008.

== Contributors ==
- Amy Winehouse (archive footage)
- Mark Ronson
- Salaam Remi
- Tom Elmhirst
- Darcus Beese
- Nick Shymansky
- Juliette Ashby
- Dionne Bromfield
- Ronnie Spector

== An Intimate Evening in London ==
The documentary film is accompanied by An Intimate Evening in London, consisting of previously unseen footage of a performance by Winehouse at Riverside Studios in London in February 2008. It was a private show given for family, friends and record company executives on the night she won five Grammy Awards.

== See also ==
- Amy (2015)
