= Back to Black =

2006 studio album by Amy Winehouse

- Standard edition cover (Note: Physically used in all countries and digitally in the United States and Japan)

Studio album by Amy Winehouse
- Released: 27 October 2006
- Recorded: 2005–2006
- Studios: Instrument Zoo (Miami) (Note: Tracks 3, 4, 7, 9 and 11); Daptone (New York City) (Note: Tracks 1, 2, 5, 6, 8 and 10); Allido (New York City) (Note: Track 10); Chung King (New York City) (Note: Tracks 1, 2, 5, 6 and 8); Metropolis (London)
- Genres: Soul; rhythm and blues; contemporary R&B; neo soul; pop
- Length: 34:56
- Label: Island
- Producers: Mark Ronson; Salaam Remi

Amy Winehouse chronology
| Frank (2003) | Back to Black (2006) | I Told You I Was Trouble: Live in London (2007) |

Alternative cover
- Physical US and Japanese cover

Singles from Back to Black
- 1. "Rehab" Released: 23 October 2006; 2. "You Know I'm No Good" Released: 8 January 2007; 3. "Back to Black" Released: 30 April 2007; 4. "Tears Dry on Their Own" Released: 13 August 2007; 5. "Love Is a Losing Game" Released: 10 December 2007

Back to Black is the second and final studio album by the English singer-songwriter Amy Winehouse, released on 27 October 2006 by Island Records. Winehouse predominantly based the album on her tumultuous relationship with Blake Fielder-Civil, who temporarily left her to pursue an ex-girlfriend. Their brief separation spurred Winehouse to create an album that explores themes of guilt, grief, infidelity, heartbreak and trauma in a relationship.

Influenced by the pop and soul music of 1960s girl groups, Winehouse collaborated with producers Salaam Remi and Mark Ronson, along with Sharon Jones' band The Dap-Kings, to assist her on capturing the sounds from that period while blending them with contemporary R&B and neo-soul music. Between 2005 and 2006, she recorded the album's songs with Remi at Instrumental Zoo Studios in Miami and then with Ronson and the Dap-Kings at Chung King Studios and Daptone Records in New York. Tom Elmhirst mixed the album at Metropolis Studios in London. The album was promoted with five singles: "Rehab", "You Know I'm No Good", "Back to Black", "Tears Dry on Their Own" and "Love Is a Losing Game".

Back to Black sold over 25 million copies worldwide, becoming one of the best-selling albums of all time and the UK's second best-selling album of the 21st century. It received widespread acclaim from music critics, who praised Winehouse's songwriting, emotive singing style, and Remi and Ronson's production. At the 2008 Grammy Awards, Back to Black won Best Pop Vocal Album and was also nominated for Album of the Year. At the same ceremony, Winehouse won four additional awards, tying her with five other artists as the second-most awarded female in a single ceremony. The album was also nominated at the 2007 Brit Awards for MasterCard British Album and was short-listed for the 2007 Mercury Prize, among other accolades.

Recognized as a key recording in the widespread popularity of British soul throughout the late 2000s, Back to Black established Winehouse as a cultural icon and appears in numerous lists of the greatest albums of all time. In 2025, it was selected by the Library of Congress for preservation in the National Recording Registry as a "culturally, historically, or aesthetically significant" work.

== Background ==
After signing with Island Records in 2002, Winehouse released her debut album, Frank, on 20 October 2003. She dedicated the album to her ex-boyfriend, Chris Taylor, as she gradually lost interest in him. Produced mainly by Salaam Remi, many songs were influenced by jazz, and apart from two cover versions, every song was co-written by Winehouse. The album received positive reviews, with compliments over the "cool, critical gaze" in its lyrics, while her vocals drew comparisons to Sarah Vaughan, Macy Gray and others. The album reached number 13 on the UK Albums Chart at the time of its release, and has been certified triple Platinum by the British Phonographic Industry (BPI). In 2004, Winehouse was nominated for British Female Solo Artist and British Urban Act at the Brit Awards, while Frank made the shortlist for the Mercury Prize. That same year, the album's first single, "Stronger Than Me", earned Winehouse and Remi an Ivor Novello Award for Best Contemporary Song. In a 2004 interview with The Observer, Winehouse expressed dissatisfaction with the album, stating that "some things on [the] album [made her] go to a little place that's fucking bitter". She further notes that the marketing was "fucked", the promotion was "terrible", and everything was "a shambles".

In 2005, Winehouse dated Blake Fielder-Civil, who was an assistant on music video sets. Around the same time, she rediscovered the 1960s music she loved as a girl, stating in a 2007 Rolling Stone interview: "When I fell in love with Blake, there was Sixties music around us a lot." In 2005, the couple spent a lot of time in a local Camden bar, and during their time there, Winehouse would listen to blues, '60s girl groups, and Motown artists, explaining that "it was [her] local" and "spent a lot of time there [...] playing pool and listening to jukebox music." The music heard in the bar appealed to Winehouse when she was writing songs for her second album.

Around the same year, she went through a period of drinking, heavy drug use, and weight loss. People who saw her during the end of that year and early 2006 reported a rebound that coincided with the writing of Back to Black. Her family believes that the mid-2006 death of her grandmother, who was a stabilising influence, set her off into addiction. Fielder-Civil then left Winehouse to revert to his previous girlfriend. During their break, she would write the bulk of the album on the state of her "relationship at the time with Blake [Fielder-Civil]" through themes of "grief, guilt, and heartache". Winehouse dated musician Alex Clare briefly in 2006, and would later return to and marry Fielder-Civil in the following year.

== Recording and production ==
Most of the songs on Back to Black were solely written by Winehouse, as her primary focus of the album's sound shifted more towards the style of the girl groups from the 1950s and 1960s. Winehouse worked with New York singer Sharon Jones's longtime band, the Dap-Kings, to back her up in the studio and on tour. Her father, Mitch Winehouse, relates in his memoir, Amy, My Daughter, how fascinating watching her process was, especially with witnessing her perfectionism in the studio. She would also put out what she had sung on a CD and play it in his taxi outside to know how most people would hear her music.

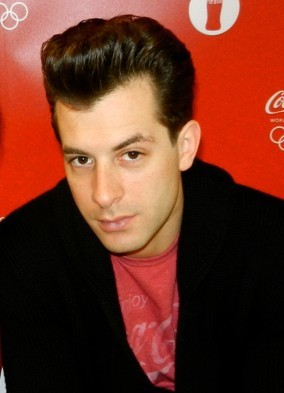
Mark Ronson (pictured above) was one of the main co-producers for the album.

In 2005, Winehouse returned to Miami (as she went there previously to produce her debut album) to record five songs at Salaam Remi's Instrumental Zoo Studios: "Tears Dry on Their Own", "Some Unholy War", "Me & Mr Jones", "Just Friends", and "Addicted". The recording process of Remi's album portion was "intimate", consisting of Winehouse singing while on guitar and Remi adding the other instruments played mostly by himself (chiefly played the piano and the main/bass guitars on the album), or by instrumentalist Vincent Henry (primarily played the saxophone, the flute, and the clarinet). Winehouse and producer Mark Ronson both shared a publishing company, which encouraged a meeting between the two. They conversed in March 2006 in Ronson's New York studio that he used to have. They worked on six tracks together: "Rehab", "Back to Black", "You Know I'm No Good", "Love Is a Losing Game", "Wake Up Alone", and "He Can Only Hold Her". Ronson said in a 2010 interview with The Guardian that he liked working with Winehouse because she was blunt when she did not like his work. She in turn thought that when they first met, he was a sound engineer and that she was expecting an "older man with a beard".

Ronson wrote "Back to Black" the night after he met Winehouse, explaining in a 2010 Mojo interview:

I just thought, 'Let's talk about music, see what she likes.' She said she liked to go out to bars and clubs and play snooker with her boyfriend and listen to the Shangri-Las. So she played me some of those records ... I told her that I had nothing to play her right now but if she [lets] me work on something overnight she could come back tomorrow. So I came up with this little piano riff, which became the verse chords to 'Back to Black.' Behind it I just put a kick drum and a tambourine and tons of reverb.

Mark Ronson later recalled the Back to Black recording sessions in a 2015 The FADER interview:

Amy was so serious about her words. Working on "Back to Black", when she first sang the chorus, she said, We only said goodbye in words/ I died a hundred times. My producer instinct went off and I said, "Hey, sorry, it's got to rhyme. That's weird. Can you fix that?" And she just looked at me like I was crazy, like, "Why would I fix that? That's what came out." They're some of the most unlikely lyrics you could ever imagine on a massive pop single.

Winehouse's father later recalled the formulation of "Rehab" in his memoir:

One day [Ronson and Winehouse] decided to take a quick stroll around the neighborhood because Amy wanted to buy [her then-boyfriend] Alex Clare a present ... on the way back Amy began telling Mark about being with Blake [Fielder-Civil, her ex], then not being with Blake and being with Alex instead. She told him about the time at my house after she'd been in hospital when everyone had been going on at her about her drinking: 'You know they tried to make me go to rehab, and I told them, no, no, no.' 'That's quite gimmicky,' Mark replied. 'It sounds hooky. You should go back to the studio and we should turn that into a song.'

"She was in Miami only for ten days for Back to Black. Her vocals were quick. She'd give a couple takes that were effortless and honest, and we'd have it. People think of studio sessions as all-nighters, but we'd get there at 10 a.m. to set up; she'd come at noon. By 8 or 9 at night, we were done and we'd be back up in the morning getting it done in the daylight."

— Frank Socorro, sound engineer for Back to Black

The majority of the songs produced by Ronson were completed at Daptone Records—along with the instrumental help of The Dap-Kings—in Brooklyn, New York. Three of the horn players from the group played a baritone saxophone, a tenor saxophone, and a trumpet. Ronson recorded the trio to create the "'60s-sounding metallics" on the album. The drums, piano, guitar, and bass were all done together in one room, with the drums being recorded with one microphone. There was also much spill between the instruments. Additional production of the album was located at Chung King and Allido Studios in New York City, and at Metropolis Records in London. In the Allido studio, Ronson used synthesisers and vintage keyboards to display the sound landscape for the album, including the Wurlitzer electric piano. In May of that year, Winehouse's demo tracks such as "You Know I'm No Good" and "Rehab" appeared on Mark Ronson's New York radio show on East Village Radio. These were some of the first new songs played on the radio after the release of "Pumps" and both were slated to appear on her second album. The 11-track album, completed in five months, was produced entirely by Remi and Ronson, with the production credits being split between them.

Tom Elmhirst, who mixed the single "You Know I'm No Good", was enlisted to help with the mixing of the album at Metropolis Records. He first received Ronson's original mix, which he described as being "radical in terms of panning, kind of Beatlesque". He continued, "The drums, for instance, were all panned to one side". He attempted to mix "Love Is a Losing Game" in the same manner he did with "Rehab", but felt it was not right to do so. Elmhirst mixed "Rehab", but when he first received the multitrack of the song, many tracks remained unused. Therefore, Ronson went to London to record strings, brass and percussion in one of Metropolis' tracking rooms. After these instruments were added, the song had garnered a "retro, '60s soul, R&B" feel to it. Elmhirst added a contemporary sound to the song as well, while Ronson wanted to keep the mix sparse and not overproduced. The album was mastered by Stuart Hawkes at Metropolis.

== Music and lyrics ==
=== Composition and sound ===
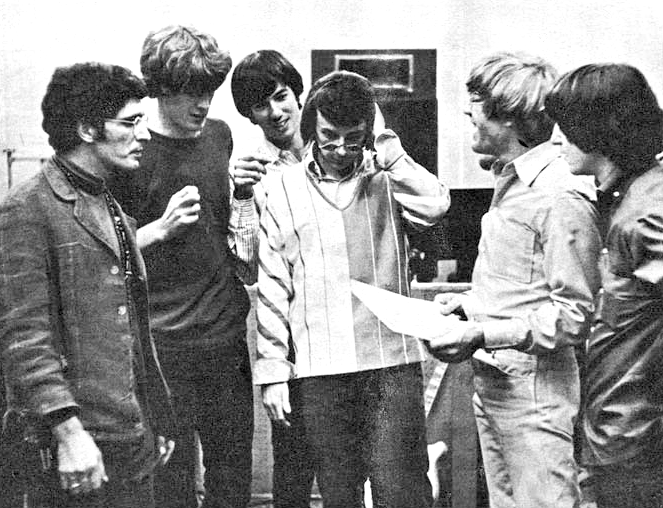
The album is noted to resemble Phil Spector's Wall of Sound.

Back to Black has been cited to have musical stylings of contemporary R&B, neo soul, reggae, classic R&B, and 1960s "pop and soul". According to AllMusic's John Bush, Back to Black finds Winehouse "deserting jazz and wholly embracing contemporary R&B". David Mead of Paste also viewed it as a departure from Frank and said that it sets her singing to Salaam Remi and Mark Ronson's "synthetic Motown-style backdrop". Meanwhile, Ann Powers from NPR Music characterised Back to Black as "a full embrace of classic rhythm and blues." Music journalist Chuck Eddy credits Ronson and Remi's production for resembling Phil Spector's Wall of Sound technique and surrounding Winehouse with brass and string sections, harp, and the Wurlitzer. PopMatters writer Christian John Wikane said that its "sensibilities of 1960s pop and soul" are contradicted by Winehouse's "blunt" lyrics and felt that "this particular marriage of words and music mirrors the bittersweet dichotomy that sometimes frames real relationships". The staff of The A.V. Club emphasized on "the record's status as the pinnacle of the Brit neo-soul wave it ushered in".

=== Songs 1–6 ===
The album's first song and single, "Rehab", is an upbeat, contemporary, and autobiographical song about Winehouse's past refusal to attend an alcohol rehabilitation centre after a conversation she had with her father, Mitch Winehouse. Previously, her management team prodded her to go to one. The song also contains "spring reverbs" on the lead vocals and drums to obtain a "retro feel", live "handclaps", timpanis, bells, and "slight vintage effects" on the piano and bass. Winehouse mentions "Ray" and "Mr. Hathaway", in reference to Ray Charles and Donny Hathaway. However, for some time during live performances, she replaced "Ray" with "Blake", referring to her ex-husband, Blake Fielder-Civil, who served time in prison for charges relating to grievous bodily harm.

"You Know I'm No Good" is an uptempo song about Winehouse cheating on a "good man that loves her", and therefore cheating herself out of a healthy relationship. The lyrics also entail Winehouse as being "helpless" while trying to understand and resist her own self-destructive compulsions.

In the jazz and reggae-influenced "Me and Mr Jones" song, Winehouse sings about accepting that she never made it to a Slick Rick concert, but yet refuses to skip a Nas show as they were both close friends (Nas' last name is Jones). The song's title plays off the 1972 "Me and Mrs. Jones" by Billy Paul. In a 2011 XXL interview, Nas recollects: "I don't really remember if Salaam, who was really close to her [Winehouse], who introduced us, if he told me about it ["Mr Jones" being based on Nas] or not [...] But, I heard a lot about it before I even heard the song." Winehouse cursed about the relationship between her and Nas in the song's first chorus ("What kind of fuckery is this?" / "You made me miss the Slick Rick gig") and in later ones as well. In a Genius commentary, Island Records president Darcus Beese added that the original track was titled "Fuckery" from both Remi and Winehouse. He then continues, "I remember saying to Amy and Salaam, "You can't call this song 'Fuckery' [...] Salaam was more of the grown up of the two but Amy was like, 'Well, why can't I?' [...] That's why I always say, you have to give everything you're thinking and give people something that's exciting."

The fourth song on the album, "Just Friends", is about "[a woman] trying to pull away from an illicit affair", with lyrics indicating, "The guilt will kill you if she don't first". It is a "ska-soul" song with a "pulsing reggae groove" throughout the track. Jon Pareles of The New York Times elaborates that Winehouse makes songs such as "Just Friends" into "games of tone and phrasing [...] withholding a line and then breezing through it, stretching out a note over [her backing band]'s steady beat".

The title track "Back to Black" explores elements of old-school soul music. The song's sound and beat have been described as similar to vintage girl groups from the 1960s. Its production was noted for its Wall of Sound. Winehouse expresses feelings of hurt and bitterness for a boyfriend who has left her; however, throughout the lyrics she "remains strong", exemplified in the opening lines, "He left no time to regret, Kept his dick wet, With his same old safe bet, Me and my head high, And my tears dry, Get on without my guy". The song was inspired by her relationship with Fielder-Civil, who had left Winehouse for an ex-girlfriend. The breakup left her going to "black", which to the listener may appear to refer to drinking and depression. "Black" has sometimes been considered a reference to heroin, but this is inaccurate as Winehouse's heroin use did not begin until after her marriage to Blake Fielder-Civil (mid 2007), as confirmed in the Asif Kapadia documentary. The song's lyrical content consists of a sad goodbye to a relationship with the lyrics being frank. John Murphy of MusicOMH compared the song's introduction to the Martha and the Vandellas song "Jimmy Mack", adding that it continues to a "much darker place".

"Love Is a Losing Game" is a sentimental ballad that invokes Winehouse's chosen metaphor as a pastime that could be "addictive and destructive". Alexis Petridis of The Guardian further explains, "Over a solitary electric guitar and subtle drums, [Winehouse's] voice takes centre stage to [set] out her resigned viewpoint that, as with gambling, you can only love for so long before ending up the loser".

=== Songs 7–11 ===
"Tears Dry on Their Own"
The main chord progression of the song's chorus interpolates Marvin Gaye and Tammi Terrell's 1967 song "Ain't No Mountain High Enough".

The song "Tears Dry on Their Own" samples the main chord progression from Marvin Gaye and Tammi Terrell's 1967 song "Ain't No Mountain High Enough". Remi stated that he thought the album needed something "up-tempo" and suggested to Winehouse that she procure a "slower, sadder conception" of the song. Laura Barton of The Guardian explicated the track as Winehouse giving herself a stern "talking-to" with lyrics such as, "I cannot play myself again, I should be my own best friend" and "Not fuck myself in the head with stupid men".

The HelloBeautiful staff views "Wake Up Alone", written by Winehouse and Paul O'Duffy, as another sentimental ballad that "chronicles [the] time right after a breakup [and] when you're trying not to think of the person by keeping busy." They add, "[B]ut when night time comes, so do [the] thoughts of said person." Winehouse spent a month in O'Duffy's North London studio working on tracks of the album, and "Wake Up Alone" was the first song recorded during the sessions and the only tune that made it onto the album. A "one-take" demo of the song recorded in March 2006 by O'Duffy later appeared on Winehouse's posthumous album, Lioness: Hidden Treasures.

Nick Shymansky, Winehouse's first manager, revealed that the inspiration of "Some Unholy War", a mid-tempo soul song, came into fruition after Winehouse heard a radio broadcast on the War in Afghanistan. As she heard the term "holy war", a war being primarily caused or justified by differences in religion, Winehouse immediately thought of an idea to spin the religious conflict into her own personal issues with Fielder-Civil. The idea is further bolstered with the song's opening lines, "If my man was fighting some unholy war, I would be behind him". Usually in live performances, she would start with the slower version of the song before proceeding into a more uptempo version.

"He Can Only Hold Her" interpolates "(My Girl) She's a Fox" by brothers Robert and Richard Poindexter. Joshua Klein of Pitchfork describes Winehouse in the song as "an objective observer, [and] able to see her personal issues for what they are". The chorus goes, "So he tries to pacify her, 'cause what's inside her never dies". Klein assumes that from "this new vantage [,] Winehouse has moved on". John Harrison, the original demo producer of "He Can Only Hold Her", explained at a BIMM London masterclass that he was "introduced to '(My Girl) She's a Fox' by his sister". He then played the song for Winehouse and, when she expressed interest, made a backing track for her. Harrison was not originally given a writing credit on Back to Black, so he sued Winehouse for copyright infringement. They had a settlement over the song, and eventually, his name was added to the track. The initial Back to Black liner notes only said: "Original demo produced by P*Nut [John Harrison's nickname]."

"Addicted", a bonus track included on the expanded versions of Back to Black, pertains to Winehouse's experiences with marijuana. "I used to smoke a lot of weed", the singer told Rolling Stone in 2007. "I suppose if you have an addictive personality [,] then you go from one poison to the other."

== Release and promotion ==
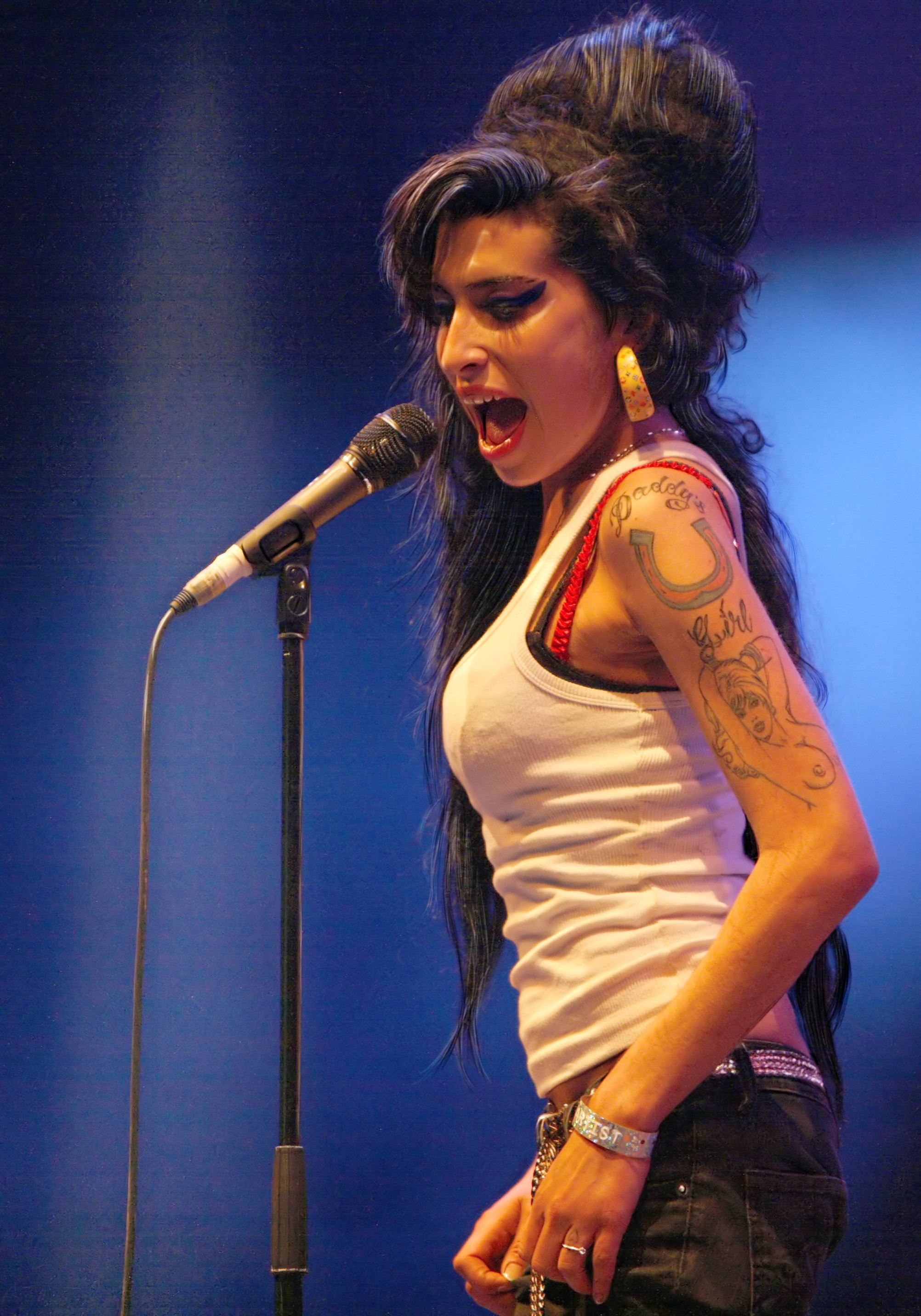
Winehouse performing at the Eurockéennes festival in France in 2007

Back to Black was released on 27 October 2006. A deluxe edition of Back to Black was released in mainland Europe in November 2007 and in the United Kingdom on 3 December 2007. The reissue features the original studio album remastered as well as a bonus disc containing various B-sides and live tracks, including Winehouse's solo rendition of the single "Valerie" on BBC Radio 1's Live Lounge; the song was originally available in studio form on Ronson's Version album. Winehouse's debut DVD I Told You I Was Trouble: Live in London was released in the UK on 5 November and in the US on 13 November. It includes a live set recorded at London's Shepherd's Bush Empire and a 50-minute documentary chronicling the singer's career over the previous four years.

The first single released from the album on 23 October 2006 was "Rehab". On 22 October 2006, based solely on download sales, it entered the UK Singles Chart at number 19, and when the physical single was released the following week, it climbed to number seven. Following a performance of "Rehab" at the 2007 MTV Movie Awards on 3 June 2007, the song rose to number 10 on the US Billboard Hot 100 for the week of 23 June, peaking at number nine the following week.

"You Know I'm No Good" was released on 8 January 2007 as the album's second single, reaching number 18 on the UK Singles Chart. Back to Black was released in the United States in March 2007, with a remix of "You Know I'm No Good" featuring rap vocals by Ghostface Killah as its lead single. A third UK single, "Back to Black", was released on 30 April 2007. Having previously peaked at number 25 on the UK chart, the track climbed to number eight in late July 2011, following Winehouse's death. Two further singles were released from the album: "Tears Dry on Their Own" was released on 13 August 2007, and peaked at number 16 in the UK, while "Love Is a Losing Game", released on 10 December 2007, reached number 33.

=== Touring ===
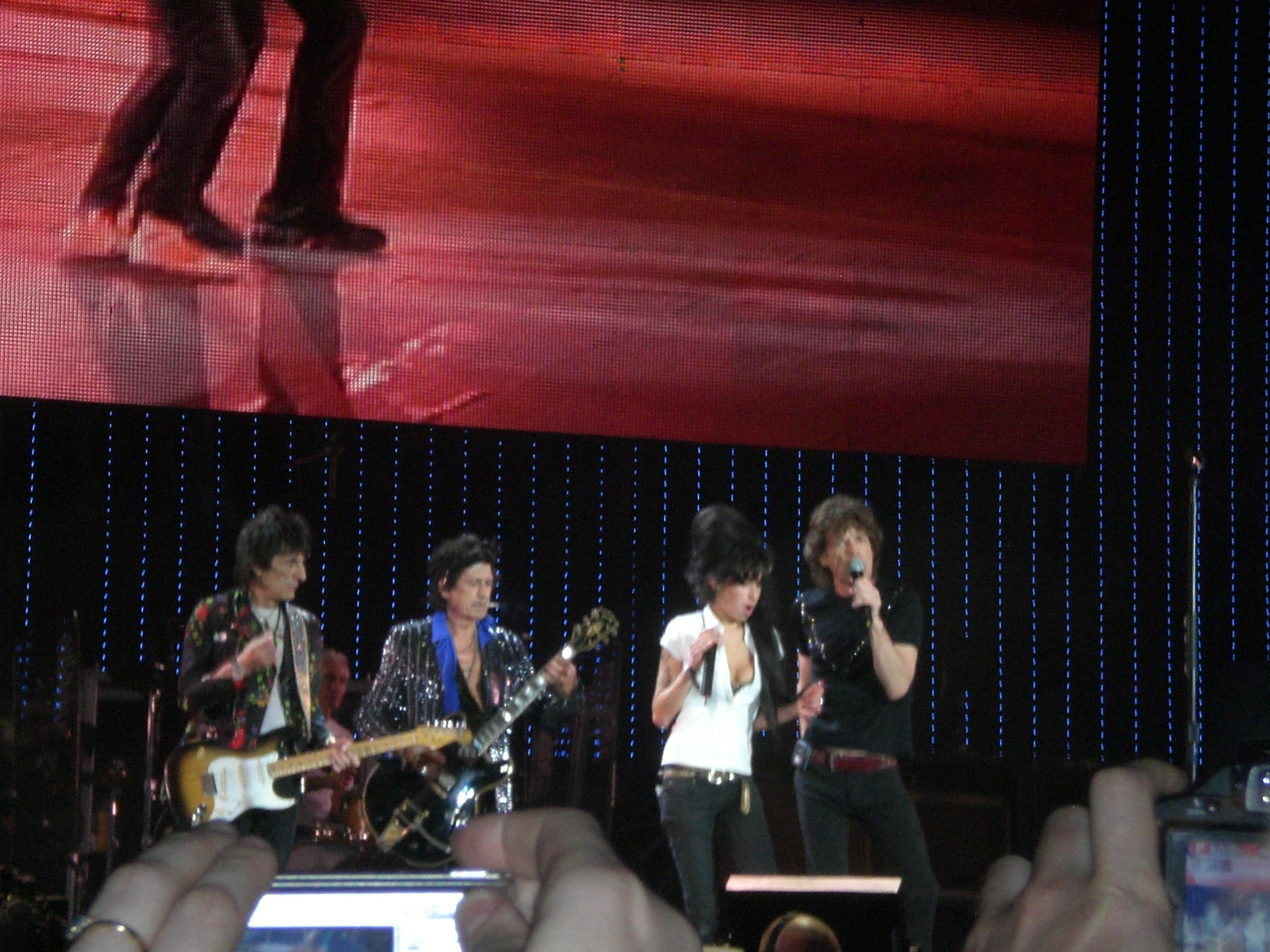
Winehouse performing with the Rolling Stones at the Isle of Wight Festival 2007

Winehouse promoted the release of Back to Black with headline performances in late 2006, including a Little Noise Sessions charity concert at the Union Chapel in Islington, London. On 31 December 2006, Winehouse appeared on Jools Holland's Annual Hootenanny and performed a cover of Marvin Gaye's "I Heard It Through the Grapevine" along with Paul Weller and Holland's Rhythm and Blues Orchestra. She also performed Toots and the Maytals' "Monkey Man". At his request, actor Bruce Willis introduced Winehouse before her performance of "Rehab" at the 2007 MTV Movie Awards in Universal City, California, on 3 June 2007. During the summer of 2007, she performed at various festivals, including Glastonbury Festival, Lollapalooza in Chicago, Belgium's Rock Werchter, and Virgin Festival in Baltimore.

In November 2007, the opening night of a 17-date tour was marred by booing and walkouts at the National Indoor Arena in Birmingham. A critic for the Birmingham Mail said it was "one of the saddest nights of my life [...] I saw a supremely talented artist reduced to tears, stumbling around the stage and, unforgivably, swearing at the audience." Other concerts ended similarly, with, for example, fans at her Hammersmith Apollo performance saying that she "looked highly intoxicated throughout", until she announced on 27 November 2007 that her performances and public appearances were cancelled for the remainder of the year, citing her doctor's advice to take a complete rest. A statement issued by concert promoter Live Nation blamed "the rigours involved in touring and the intense emotional strain that Amy has been under in recent weeks" for the decision. Mitch Winehouse wrote about her nervousness before public performances in his 2012 book, Amy, My Daughter.

== Critical reception ==
Professional ratings
Aggregate scores
| Source | Rating |
|---|---|
| Metacritic | 81/100 |
Review scores
| Source | Rating |
| AllMusic | 5/5 stars |
| The A.V. Club | A− |
| Entertainment Weekly | A− |
| The Guardian | 4/5 stars |
| The Independent | 5/5 stars |
| The Observer | 4/5 stars |
| Pitchfork | 6.4/10 |
| Q | 4/5 stars |
| Rolling Stone | 3/5 stars |
| The Times | 4/5 stars |

Back to Black was widely acclaimed by critics. At Metacritic, which assigns a normalised rating out of 100 to reviews from mainstream publications, the album received an average score of 81, based on 26 reviews. AllMusic writer John Bush lauded Winehouse's musical transition from her debut record: "All the best parts of her musical character emerge intact, and actually, are all the better for the transformation from jazz vocalist to soul siren." Dorian Lynskey of The Guardian called Back to Black "a 21st-century soul classic". Sal Cinquemani of Slant Magazine said that Winehouse and her producers are "expert mood-setters or crafty reconstructionists". The New Yorker's Sasha Frere-Jones praised Winehouse's "mush-mouthed approach [on the album]". Nathan Rabin, writing in The A.V. Club, was impressed by "the incongruity between Winehouse's trifling lyrical concerns and Back To Black's wall-of-sound richness". Entertainment Weekly's Will Hermes felt that her "smartass" lyrics "raise [the album] into the realm of true, of-the-minute originality". Douglas Wolk, writing for Blender, said that the album "sounds fantastic—partly because the production nails sample-ready '60s soul right down to the drum sound [...] Winehouse is one hell of an impressive singer, especially when she's not copping other people's phrasing".

Some reviewers were more critical of the album. In a mixed review, Rolling Stone's Christian Hoard stated: "The tunes don't always hold up. But the best ones are impossible to dislike." Robert Christgau gave it an "honorable mention" in his consumer guide for MSN Music, citing "You Know I'm No Good" and "Rehab" as highlights and writing, "Pray her marriage lasts—she's observant, and it would broaden her perspective". Pitchfork critic Joshua Klein criticised Winehouse's "defensive", subjective lyrics concerning relationships, but added that "Winehouse has been blessed by a brassy voice that can transform even mundane sentiments into powerful statements".

=== Accolades ===
Back to Black was named one of the 10 best albums of 2006 and 2007 by several publications on their year-end albums lists, including Time (number one), Entertainment Weekly (number two), Billboard (number three), The New York Times (number three), The Austin Chronicle (number four), Slant Magazine (number four), and Blender (number eight). The album was placed at number 40 on Rolling Stone's list of The Top 50 Albums of 2007. Entertainment Weekly critic Chris Willman named Back to Black the second best album of 2007, commenting that "Black will hold up as one of the great breakthrough CDs of our time." He adds, "In the end, the singer's real-life heartache over her incarcerated spouse proves what's obvious from the grooves: When this lady sings about love, she means every word."

At the 2007 Brit Awards, Winehouse won British Female Solo Artist, and Back to Black was nominated for MasterCard British Album. In July 2007, the album was shortlisted for the 2007 Mercury Prize, but lost out to Klaxons' Myths of the Near Future. This was the second time that Winehouse was nominated for the Mercury Prize; her debut album Frank was shortlisted in 2004. Back to Black won numerous awards at the 50th Annual Grammy Awards on 10 February 2008, including Record of the Year and Song of the Year for "Rehab"; while the album received nominations for Album of the Year and Best Pop Vocal Album, winning the latter. Winehouse herself, for the album, was presented the Grammy for Best New Artist, while Ronson earned the 2008 Grammy Award for Producer of the Year, Non-Classical.

== Commercial performance ==
Back to Black debuted at number three on the UK Albums Chart on 5 November 2006 with first-week sales of 43,021 copies. The album reached number one for the first time during the week ending 20 January 2007, its 11th week on the chart, selling over 35,500 copies. The following week, it remained at number one with nearly 48,000 copies sold. Five weeks later, it returned for a third week atop the UK chart, selling 47,000 copies. Back to Black was the best-selling album of 2007 in the UK, having sold 1.85 million copies. The BPI certified the album 15-times Platinum on 28 March 2025, denoting shipments of 4.5 million copies in the UK, making it the UK's second best-selling album of the 21st century so far, as well as the joint 11th best-selling album in the UK of all time.

Back to Black debuted at number seven on the Billboard 200 in the United States with first-week sales of 51,000 copies, becoming the highest debut entry for an album by a British female solo artist at the time—a record that would be broken by Joss Stone's Introducing Joss Stone, which debuted at number two on the Billboard 200 the following week. Following Winehouse's multiple wins at the 50th Annual Grammy Awards, the album jumped from number 24 to a new peak of number two on the Billboard 200 chart issue dated 1 March 2008 with sales of 115,000 copies. The album was certified double-Platinum by the Recording Industry Association of America (RIAA) on 12 March 2008, and has since sold nearly three million copies in the US.

Back to Black topped the European Top 100 Albums chart for 13 non-consecutive weeks, while reaching number one in several European countries such as Austria, Belgium, Germany, Greece, Ireland, and Switzerland. The album was certified eight-times Platinum by the International Federation of the Phonographic Industry (IFPI) in late 2011, denoting sales of eight million copies across Europe.

Following Winehouse's death on 23 July 2011, sales of Back to Black drastically increased across the world. The album rose to number one on several iTunes charts worldwide. On 24 July 2011, with fewer than seven hours sales after the announcement of her death counting towards the respective week's chart figures, the album re-entered the UK Albums Chart at number 49 with 2,446 copies sold. The following week, it soared back to number one, marking the fourth time the album had reached the top of the chart. Back to Black held the top spot for two additional weeks. On 26 July 2011, Billboard reported that the album had re-entered the Billboard 200 chart dated 6 August 2011 at number nine with sales of 37,000 copies, although that week's chart only tracked the first 36 hours of sales after her death was announced. The following week, it climbed to number seven with 38,000 copies sold after a full week's worth of sales. In Canada, the album re-entered the Canadian Albums Chart at number 13 on sales of 2,500 copies. It rose to number six the following week, selling an additional 5,000 copies. In continental Europe, Back to Black returned to the number-one spot in Austria, Croatia, Germany, the Netherlands, Poland and Switzerland, while reaching number one for the first time in Italy. As of July 2015, Back to Black had sold 20 million copies worldwide.

== Legacy ==
=== Influence ===
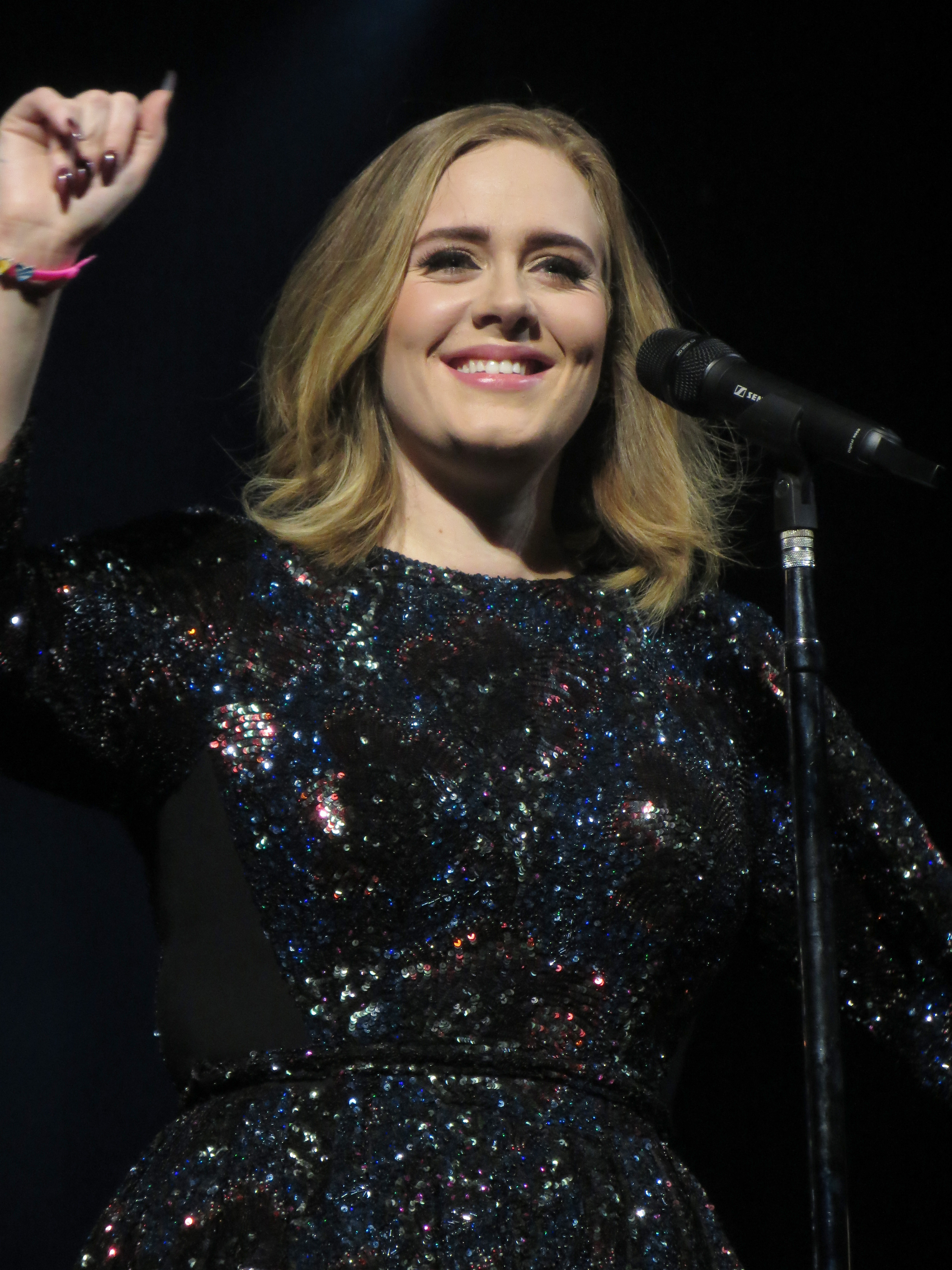
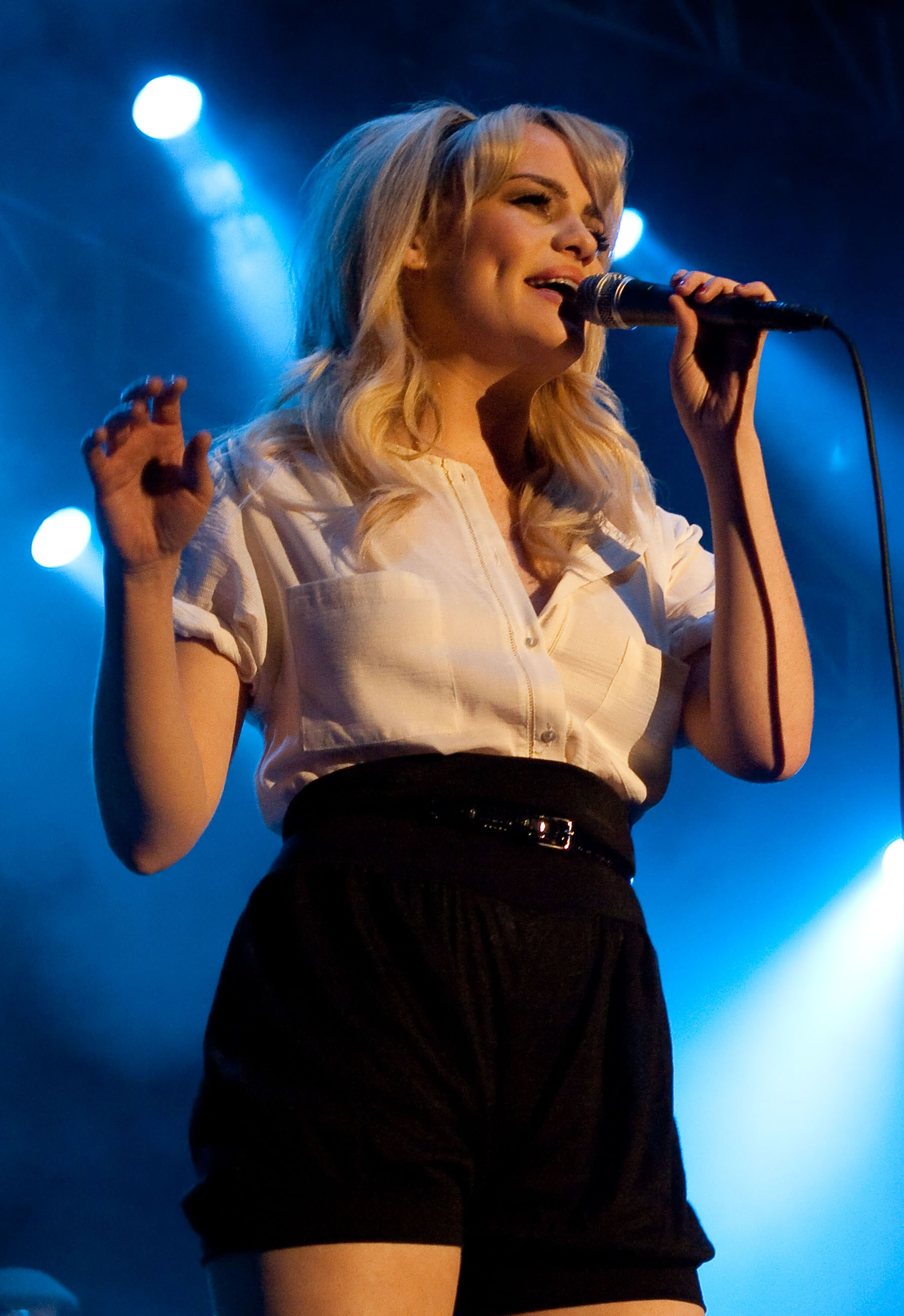
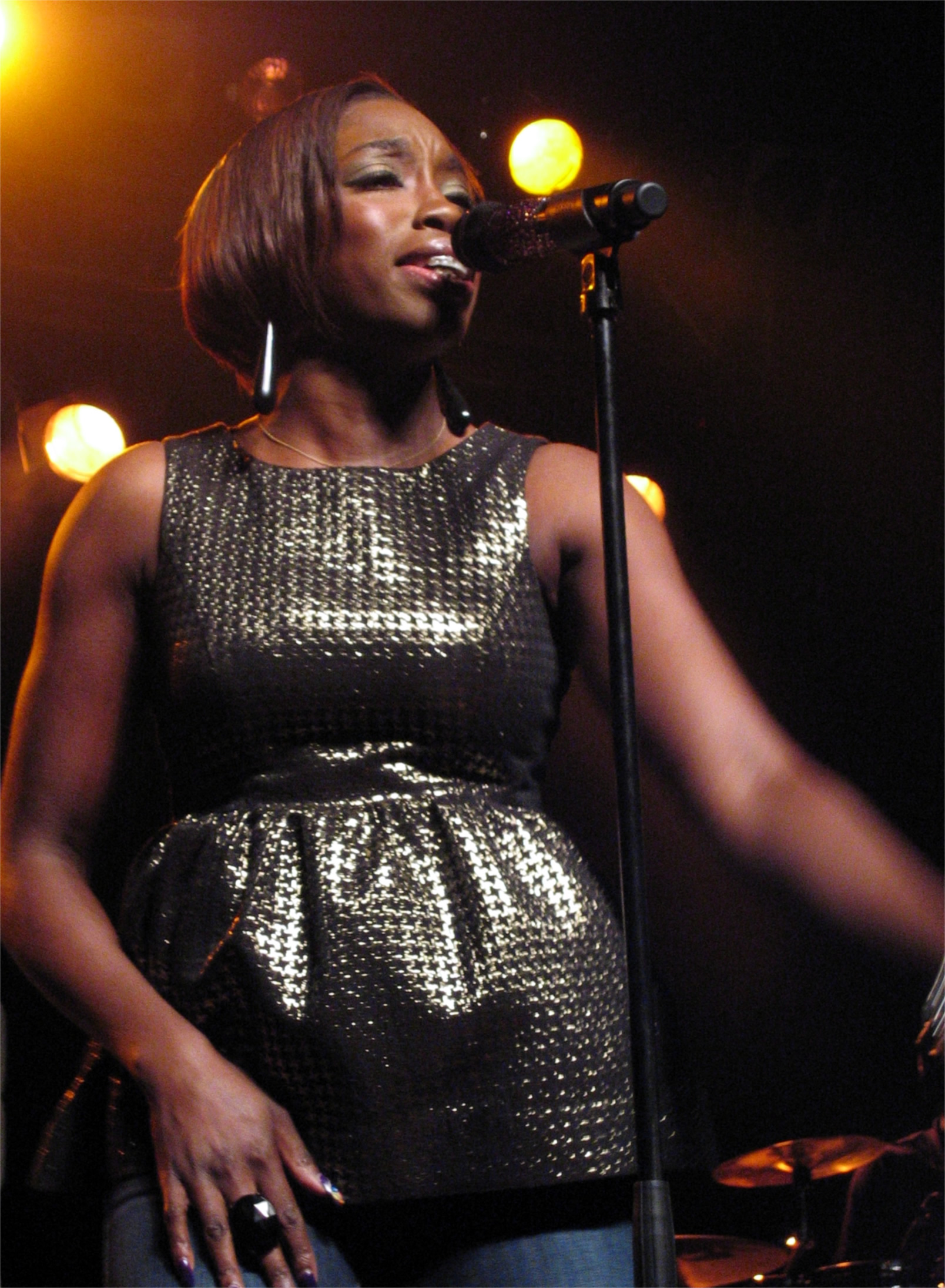
Back to Black's success helped popularise the female British soul wave in the mid-late 2000s, paving the way for prominent artists such as Adele, Duffy, and Estelle.

After the release of Back to Black, record companies sought out more experimental female artists. Other female artists signed to major labels included Adele, Duffy, V V Brown, Florence and the Machine, La Roux and Little Boots. In the years after Back to Black was released, Dan Cairns of The Sunday Times noted that there was a "notion [by A&R executives, radio playlisters and the public] that women are the driving commercial force in pop". In March 2011, the New York Daily News ran an article attributing the continuing wave of British female artists that have been successful in the United States to Winehouse and her absence. Spin magazine music editor Charles Aaron was quoted as saying, "Amy Winehouse was the Nirvana moment for all these women [...] They can all be traced back to her in terms of attitude, musical styles or fashion." According to Keith Caulfield, chart manager for Billboard, "Because of Amy, or the lack thereof, the marketplace was able to get singers like Adele, Estelle and Duffy [...] Now those ladies have brought on the new ones, like Eliza Doolittle, Rumer and Ellie [Goulding]." Linda Barnard of The Toronto Star finds Winehouse to be among "the British women who claimed chart-topping ownership [...] with powerful voices" and that her "impressive" five Grammy wins for Back to Black put her at the "pinnacle of pop music".

In 2011, Rolling Stone ranked the album at number 20 on its list of the 100 Best Albums of the 2000s; the same publication ranked the album at number 33 on its list 500 Greatest Albums of All Time list. The album was also included in the book 1001 Albums You Must Hear Before You Die. In a retrospective review by the same publication in 2010, Douglas Wolk gave the album four-and-a-half out of five stars and referred to it as "an unlikely marvel, a desperately sad and stirring record whose hooks and production (by Remi and Mark Ronson) are worthy of the soul hall-of-famers she namedrops—'Tears Dry on Their Own' is basically 'Ain't No Mountain High Enough' recast as self-recrimination". In a 2019 poll of music writers conducted by The Guardian, Back to Black placed first in a ranking of the best albums of the 21st century, and the same publication included the album on their 2025 list of defining events in popular culture of the 21st century. Also in 2025, the album was deemed "culturally, historically, or aesthetically significant" by the Library of Congress and selected for preservation in the National Recording Registry.

=== Films ===
In September 2018, a documentary film based on Back to Black, titled Amy Winehouse: Back to Black, was released. It contains new interviews, as well as archival footage. It was made by Eagle Vision, produced by Gil Cang, and released on DVD on 2 November 2018. The film features interviews by producers Mark Ronson and Salaam Remi, who worked half and half on the album, along with the Dap-Kings, Remi's music team, Ronettes singer Ronnie Spector, and close friends of Winehouse, including Nick Shymansky, Juliette Ashby, and Dionne Bromfield. The film is accompanied by An Intimate Evening in London, footage of a show Winehouse gave at Riverside Studios in London in 2008. The Sam Taylor-Johnson-directed biographical film Back to Black (2024), based on Winehouse's life, was named after the album. The movie delves into the creation and background of the album of the same name.

=== 20th Anniversary ===
In October 2026, Back to Black was commemorated with a series of releases and events marking the album's 20th anniversary. On 23 October, an expanded edition was released through Universal Music Recordings and Island Records in 3LP, 3CD and digital formats. The release included the original album alongside B-sides, bonus tracks, and four previously unreleased demos; "I'm No Good", "Fuckery", "I've Been Drinkin'" and "Tears Dry". The edition also included a previously unreleased complete recording of Winehouse's performance at Paradiso in Amsterdam on 8 February 2007.

On 21 October, Amy Winehouse: Back to Black at 20, a commemorative concert celebrating the album, took place at Camden Town's Roundhouse. Curated by the album's producers Mark Ronson and Salaam Remi, the event featured The Amy Winehouse Band performing the album in full, accompanied by guest vocalists including Corinne Bailey Rae, Sasha Keable, Nia Smith, Skye Newman, Yebba, Terri Walker, Lianne La Havas, Baby Rose, Jorja Smith, FLO and Jessie Reyez. The concert was subsequently aired on BBC Two and BBC iPlayer on 24 October and broadcast on BBC Radio 2 on 26 October.

== Track listing ==
All tracks are written by Amy Winehouse, except where noted.

| No. | Title | Writer(s) | Producer(s) | Length |
|---|---|---|---|---|
| 1. | "Rehab" | | Mark Ronson | 3:34 |
| 2. | "You Know I'm No Good" | | Ronson | 4:17 |
| 3. | "Me & Mr. Jones" | | Salaam Remi | 2:33 |
| 4. | "Just Friends" | | Remi | 3:13 |
| 5. | "Back to Black" | Winehouse; Ronson | Ronson | 4:01 |
| 6. | "Love Is a Losing Game" | | Ronson | 2:35 |
| 7. | "Tears Dry on Their Own" | Winehouse; Nickolas Ashford; Valerie Simpson | Remi | 3:06 |
| 8. | "Wake Up Alone" | Winehouse; Paul O'Duffy | Ronson | 3:42 |
| 9. | "Some Unholy War" | | Remi | 2:22 |
| 10. | "He Can Only Hold Her" | Winehouse; Richard Poindexter; Robert Poindexter | Ronson | 2:46 |
| 11. | "Addicted" | | Remi | 2:45 |
| Total length: | | | | 34:56 |

US edition
| No. | Title | Writer(s) | Producer(s) | Length |
|---|---|---|---|---|
| 10. | "He Can Only Hold Her" (has 31 seconds of silence at the end) | Winehouse; Richard Poindexter; Robert Poindexter | Ronson | 3:19 |
| 11. | "You Know I'm No Good" (remix, featuring Ghostface Killah) | | Ronson | 3:22 |
| 12. | "Rehab" (Hot Chip remix) (iTunes Store bonus track) | | Ronson; Hot Chip^{[a]} | 6:58 |
| Total length: | | | | 45:47 |

Japanese edition bonus tracks
| No. | Title | Writer(s) | Producer(s) | Length |
|---|---|---|---|---|
| 12. | "Close to the Front" | Winehouse; Felix Howard; Paul Simm | Howard; Simm | 4:35 |
| 13. | "Hey Little Rich Girl" (featuring Zalon and Ade) | Rod Byers | | 3:35 |
| 14. | "Monkey Man" | Frederick Hibbert | | 2:56 |
| 15. | "Back to Black" (The Rumble Strips remix) | Winehouse; Ronson | Ronson; The Rumble Strips^{[a]} | 3:48 |
| 16. | "You Know I'm No Good" (remix, featuring Ghostface Killah) | | Ronson | 3:22 |
| Total length: | | | | 53:12 |

German limited edition bonus tracks
| No. | Title | Writer(s) | Length |
|---|---|---|---|
| 11. | "Rehab" (live at Kalkscheune / Berlin) | | 3:37 |
| 12. | "Love Is a Losing Game" (live at Kalkscheune / Berlin) | | 2:45 |
| 13. | "Tears Dry on Their Own" (live at Kalkscheune / Berlin) | Winehouse; Ashford; Simpson | 3:15 |
| 14. | "Take the Box" (live at Kalkscheune / Berlin) | Winehouse; Luke Smith | 3:39 |
| 15. | "Valerie" (live at Kalkscheune / Berlin) | Sean Payne; Dave McCabe; Abi Harding; Boyan Chowdhury; Russell Pritchard | 4:14 |
| Total length: | | | 52:26 |

Deluxe edition bonus disc
| No. | Title | Writer(s) | Producer(s) | Length |
|---|---|---|---|---|
| 1. | "Valerie" | Payne; McCabe; Harding; Chowdhury; Pritchard | Ronson | 3:53 |
| 2. | "Cupid" | Sam Cooke | | 3:49 |
| 3. | "Monkey Man" | Hibbert | | 2:56 |
| 4. | "Some Unholy War" (down tempo) | | Remi | 3:17 |
| 5. | "Hey Little Rich Girl" (featuring Zalon and Ade) | Byers | | 3:35 |
| 6. | "You're Wondering Now" (UK, Australian, and Japanese editions only) | Clement Dodd | | 2:33 |
| 7. | "To Know Him Is to Love Him" | Phil Spector | Sam Gregory | 2:24 |
| 8. | "Love Is a Losing Game" (original demo) | | Ronson | 3:43 |
| Total length: | | | | 26:10 |

Best Buy exclusive deluxe edition bonus DVD
| No. | Title | Length |
|---|---|---|
| 1. | "International Electronic Press Kit" | 23:01 |
| 2. | "Intro / Back to Black" (live @ The Orange Lounge) | 2:40 |
| 3. | "Rehab" (live @ The Orange Lounge) | 3:30 |
| 4. | "You Know I'm No Good" (live @ The Orange Lounge) | 3:11 |
| 5. | "Love Is a Losing Game" (live @ The Orange Lounge) | 2:37 |
| Total length: | | 34:59 |

Dutch limited edition bonus disc: Live from Paradiso, Amsterdam, 8 February 2007
| No. | Title | Writer(s) | Length |
|---|---|---|---|
| 1. | "Just Friends" | | 3:20 |
| 2. | "Back to Black" | Winehouse; Ronson | 3:55 |
| 3. | "I Heard Love Is Blind" | | 3:13 |
| 4. | "Rehab" | | 3:33 |
| 5. | "You Know I'm No Good" | | 4:17 |
| 6. | "Love Is a Losing Game" | | 2:47 |
| Total length: | | | 21:05 |

20th anniversary edition bonus tracks (disc two and vinyl two – B-Sides, Bonus Tracks & Demos)
| No. | Title | Writer(s) | Producer(s) | Length |
|---|---|---|---|---|
| 1. | "Valerie" (Live at BBC Radio 1 Live Lounge) | Payne; McCabe; Harding; Chowdhury; Pritchard |
| 2. | "Cupid" | Cooke | | 3:49 |
| 3. | "Monkey Man" | Hibbert | | 2:56 |
| 4. | "Hey Little Rich Girl" (featuring Zalon and Ade) | Byers | | 3:35 |
| 5. | "You're Wondering Now" | Dodd | | 2:33 |
| 6. | "To Know Him Is to Love Him" | Spector | Gregory | 2:24 |
| 7. | "You Know I'm No Good" (remix, featuring Ghostface Killah) | | Ronson | 3:22 |
| 8. | "Do Me Good" |
| 9. | "Close to the Front" | Winehouse; Felix Howard; Simm | Howard; Simm | 4:35 |
| 10. | "Rehab" (Demo) |
| 11. | "I'm No Good" ("You Know I'm Good" – Original Demo) |
| 12. | "Fuckery" ("Me & Mr. Jones" – Original Demo) |
| 13. | "I've Been Drinkin'" ("Just Friends" – Alternative Version) |
| 14. | "Back to Black" (Original Demo) |
| 15. | "Love Is Like a Losing Game" (Original Demo) |
| 16. | "Tears Dry" (Alternative Demo) |
| 17. | "Some Unholy War" (Down Tempo) |

20th anniversary edition bonus tracks (disc three and vinyl three - Live from Paradiso Amsterdam/February 8, 2007)
| No. | Title | Writer(s) | Length |
|---|---|---|---|
| 1. | "Addicted" |
| 2. | "Just Friends" | | 3:20 |
| 3. | "Tears Dry on Their Own" | Winehouse; Ashford; Simpson |
| 4. | "Cherry" | Winehouse; Howard; Remi |
| 5. | "Fuck Me Pumps" | Winehouse; Remi |
| 6. | "He Can Only Hold Her/Doo Wop (That Thing)" |
| 7. | "I Heard Love Is Blind" | | 3:13 |
| 8. | "Wake Up Alone" | Winehouse; O'Duffy |
| 9. | "Back to Black" | Winehouse; Ronson | 3:55 |
| 10. | "You Know I'm No Good" | | 4:17 |
| 11. | "Me & Mr. Jones" |
| 12. | "Rehab" | | 3:33 |
| 13. | "Love Is a Losing Game" | | 2:47 |
| 14. | "Valerie" | Payne; McCabe; Harding; Chowdhury; Pritchard |

=== Notes ===
- ^{^[a]} signifies a remixer
- "Addicted" is only included on UK and Irish pressings of the standard album, while appearing as a bonus track on all deluxe editions of the album.

=== Sample credits ===
- "Tears Dry on Their Own" contains an interpolation of "Ain't No Mountain High Enough", written by Nickolas Ashford and Valerie Simpson.
- "He Can Only Hold Her" contains an interpolation of "(My Girl) She's a Fox", written by Richard and Robert Poindexter, and performed by Lonnie Youngblood and Jimi Hendrix.
- "Fuckery ("Me & Mr. Jones" - Original Demo) contains a sample of "La Di Da Di" by performed by Doug E. Fresh and Slick Rick.

== Personnel ==
Credits adapted from the liner notes of Back to Black.

=== Musicians ===
- Amy Winehouse – vocals (all tracks); guitar (tracks 3, 4, 9, 11); background vocals (tracks 3, 7, 9, 11)
- Nick Movshon – bass guitar (tracks 1, 2, 5, 6, 8, 10)
- Homer Steinweiss – drums (tracks 1, 2, 5, 6, 8, 10)
- Thomas Brenneck – guitar (tracks 1, 2, 5, 6, 8, 10)
- Binky Griptite – guitar (tracks 1, 2, 5, 6, 8, 10)
- Victor Axelrod – piano (tracks 1, 2, 5, 6, 8, 10); Wurlitzer, claps (tracks 1, 2)
- Dave Guy – trumpet (tracks 1, 2, 10)
- Neal Sugarman – tenor saxophone (tracks 1, 2, 10, 11)
- Ian Hendrickson-Smith – baritone saxophone (tracks 1, 2)
- Mark Ronson – claps (track 1); band arrangements (tracks 1, 2, 5, 6, 8); tambourine (track 5); snaps (track 10)
- Vaughan Merrick – claps (tracks 1, 2, 5, 6, 8, 10)
- Perry Montague-Mason – violin, orchestra leader (tracks 1, 5, 6)
- Chris Tombling – violin (tracks 1, 5, 6)
- Mark Berrow – violin (tracks 1, 5, 6)
- Warren Zielinski – violin (tracks 1, 5, 6)
- Liz Edwards – violin (tracks 1, 5, 6)
- Boguslaw Kostecki – violin (tracks 1, 5, 6)
- Peter Hanson – violin (tracks 1, 5, 6)
- Jonathan Rees – violin (tracks 1, 5, 6)
- Tom Pigott-Smith – violin (tracks 1, 5, 6)
- Everton Nelson – violin (tracks 1, 5, 6)
- Bruce White – viola (tracks 1, 5, 6)
- Jon Thorne – viola (tracks 1, 5, 6)
- Katie Wilkinson – viola (tracks 1, 5, 6)
- Rachel Bolt – viola (tracks 1, 5, 6)
- Anthony Pleeth – cello (tracks 1, 5, 6)
- Joely Koos – cello (tracks 1, 5, 6)
- John Heley – cello (tracks 1, 5, 6)
- Helen Tunstall – harp (tracks 1, 6)
- Steve Sidwell – trumpet (tracks 1, 6)
- Richard Edwards – tenor trombone (tracks 1, 6)
- Andy Mackintosh – alto saxophone (tracks 1, 5, 6)
- Chris Davies – alto saxophone (tracks 1, 5, 6)
- Jamie Talbot – tenor saxophone (tracks 1, 5, 6)
- Mike Smith – tenor saxophone (tracks 1, 6)
- Dave Bishop – baritone saxophone (tracks 1, 5, 6)
- Frank Ricotti – percussion (tracks 1, 5, 6)
- Gabriel Roth – band arrangements (tracks 1, 2, 5, 6, 8)
- Chris Elliott – orchestra arrangements, orchestra conducting (tracks 1, 5, 6)
- Isobel Griffiths – orchestra contractor (tracks 1, 5, 6)
- Salaam Remi – upright bass (track 3); drums (tracks 3, 9, 11); piano (tracks 3, 7); bass (tracks 4, 7, 9, 11); guitar (tracks 7, 9)
- Vincent Henry – baritone saxophone, tenor saxophone (tracks 3, 7); guitar (tracks 3, 4, 7, 9, 11); clarinet (tracks 4, 7); bass clarinet (track 4); alto saxophone, flute, piano, celeste (track 7); saxophone (track 11)
- Bruce Purse – bass trumpet, flugelhorn (tracks 3, 4, 7, 11); trumpet (tracks 4, 7, 11)
- Troy Auxilly-Wilson – drums (tracks 4, 7, 11); tambourine (track 7)
- John Adams – Rhodes (tracks 4, 11); organ (tracks 4, 9, 11)
- P*Nut – original demo production (track 10)
- Sam Koppelman – percussion (track 10)
- Cochemea Gastelum – baritone saxophone (track 10)
- Zalon – background vocals (track 10)
- Ade – background vocals (track 10)

=== Technical ===
- Mark Ronson – production (tracks 1, 2, 5, 6, 8, 10); recording (tracks 1, 2, 5, 6, 8)
- Tom Elmhirst – mixing (tracks 1, 2, 5–8, 10)
- Matt Paul – mixing assistance (tracks 1, 2, 5–8, 10); recording (track 10)
- Salaam Remi – production (tracks 3, 4, 7, 9, 11)
- Franklin Socorro – recording (tracks 3, 4, 7, 9, 11)
- Gleyder "Gee" Disla – recording assistance (tracks 3, 4, 7, 9, 11)
- Shomari "Sho" Dillon – recording assistance (tracks 3, 4, 7, 9, 11)
- Gary "G Major" Noble – mixing (tracks 3, 4, 9, 11)
- James Wisner – mixing assistance (tracks 3, 4, 9, 11)
- Dom Morley – recording engineering assistance (tracks 1, 5, 6, 10); recording (track 10)
- Vaughan Merrick – recording (tracks 1, 2, 5, 6, 8, 10)
- Jesse Gladstone – recording assistance (tracks 1, 2, 5, 6, 8)
- Mike Makowski – recording assistance (tracks 1, 2, 5, 6, 8)
- Gabriel Roth – recording (track 10)
- Derek Pacuk – recording (track 10)
- Stuart Hawkes – mastering (Note: Stuart Hawkes is only credited in the liner notes of select vinyl pressings of Back to Black.)

=== Artwork ===
- Mischa Richter – photography
- Harry Benson – centre page photography
- Alex Hutchinson – design

== Charts ==
=== Weekly charts ===
Weekly chart performance for Back to Black
| Chart (2006–2011) | Peak position |
|---|---|
| Australian Albums (ARIA) | 4 |
| Austrian Albums (Ö3 Austria) | 1 |
| Belgian Albums (Ultratop Flanders) | 1 |
| Belgian Albums (Ultratop Wallonia) | 2 |
| Canadian Albums (Billboard) | 4 |
| Croatian Albums (HDU) | 1 |
| Czech Albums (ČNS IFPI) | 4 |
| Danish Albums (Hitlisten) | 1 |
| Dutch Albums (Album Top 100) | 1 |
| European Albums (Billboard) | 1 |
| Finnish Albums (Suomen virallinen lista) | 2 |
| French Albums (SNEP) | 1 |
| German Albums (Offizielle Top 100) | 1 |
| Greek Albums (IFPI) | 1 |
| Hungarian Albums (MAHASZ) | 3 |
| Irish Albums (IRMA) | 1 |
| Italian Albums (FIMI) | 1 |
| Japanese Albums (Oricon) | 23 |
| Mexican Albums (Top 100 Mexico) | 6 |
| New Zealand Albums (RMNZ) | 1 |
| Norwegian Albums (VG-lista) | 1 |
| Polish Albums (ZPAV) | 1 |
| Portuguese Albums (AFP) | 1 |
| Russian Albums (2M) | 7 |
| Scottish Albums (Official Charts) | 1 |
| Slovenian Albums (IFPI) | 3 |
| Spanish Albums (Promusicae) | 1 |
| Swedish Albums (Sverigetopplistan) | 4 |
| Swiss Albums (Schweizer Hitparade) | 1 |
| Taiwanese Albums (Five Music) | 2 |
| UK Albums (Official Charts) | 1 |
| UK R&B Albums (Official Charts) | 1 |
| US Billboard 200 | 2 |
| US Top Alternative Albums (Billboard) | 2 |
| US Top R&B/Hip-Hop Albums (Billboard) | 4 |
| US Indie Store Album Sales (Billboard) | 3 |

2024–2026 weekly chart performance for Back to Black
| Chart (2024–2026) | Peak position |
|---|---|
| Argentine Albums (CAPIF) | 2 |
| Croatian International Albums (HDU) | 8 |
| German Pop Albums (Offizielle Top 100) | 2 |
| UK Albums | 22 |

=== Year-end charts ===
2006 year-end chart performance for Back to Black
| Chart (2006) | Position |
|---|---|
| UK Albums (OCC) | 69 |

2007 year-end chart performance for Back to Black
| Chart (2007) | Position |
|---|---|
| Australian Albums (ARIA) | 29 |
| Austrian Albums (Ö3 Austria) | 30 |
| Belgian Albums (Ultratop Flanders) | 5 |
| Belgian Albums (Ultratop Wallonia) | 40 |
| Dutch Albums (Album Top 100) | 4 |
| European Albums (Billboard) | 2 |
| Finnish Albums (Suomen virallinen lista) | 19 |
| French Albums (SNEP) | 6 |
| German Albums (Offizielle Top 100) | 17 |
| Hungarian Albums (MAHASZ) | 65 |
| Irish Albums (IRMA) | 2 |
| Italian Albums (FIMI) | 26 |
| New Zealand Albums (RMNZ) | 29 |
| Swedish Albums (Sverigetopplistan) | 18 |
| Swiss Albums (Schweizer Hitparade) | 3 |
| UK Albums (OCC) Standard edition | 1 |
| UK Albums (OCC) Deluxe edition | 57 |
| US Billboard 200 | 24 |
| US Top R&B/Hip-Hop Albums (Billboard) | 31 |
| Worldwide Albums (IFPI) | 2 |

2008 year-end chart performance for Back to Black
| Chart (2008) | Position |
|---|---|
| Australian Albums (ARIA) | 24 |
| Austrian Albums (Ö3 Austria) | 1 |
| Belgian Albums (Ultratop Flanders) | 4 |
| Belgian Albums (Ultratop Wallonia) | 8 |
| Brazilian Albums (ABPD) | 11 |
| Croatian Albums (HDU) | 4 |
| Danish Albums (Hitlisten) | 12 |
| Dutch Albums (Album Top 100) | 1 |
| European Albums (Billboard) Standard edition | 1 |
| European Albums (Billboard) Deluxe edition | 37 |
| Finnish Albums (Suomen virallinen lista) | 60 |
| French Albums (SNEP) | 7 |
| German Albums (Offizielle Top 100) | 1 |
| Greek Albums (IFPI) | 25 |
| Greek International Albums (IFPI) | 4 |
| Hungarian Albums (MAHASZ) | 35 |
| Irish Albums (IRMA) | 13 |
| Italian Albums (FIMI) | 8 |
| Mexican Albums (Top 100 Mexico) | 85 |
| New Zealand Albums (RMNZ) | 5 |
| Spanish Albums (PROMUSICAE) | 3 |
| Swedish Albums (Sverigetopplistan) | 25 |
| Swiss Albums (Schweizer Hitparade) | 1 |
| UK Albums (OCC) Standard edition | 57 |
| UK Albums (OCC) Deluxe edition | 14 |
| US Billboard 200 | 43 |
| US Top Alternative Albums (Billboard) | 8 |
| US Top R&B/Hip-Hop Albums (Billboard) | 42 |
| Worldwide Albums (IFPI) | 7 |

2009 year-end chart performance for Back to Black
| Chart (2009) | Position |
|---|---|
| European Albums (Billboard) | 85 |
| Spanish Albums (PROMUSICAE) | 35 |
| UK Albums (OCC) | 146 |

2011 year-end chart performance for Back to Black
| Chart (2011) | Position |
|---|---|
| Australian Albums (ARIA) | 77 |
| Austrian Albums (Ö3 Austria) | 29 |
| Belgian Albums (Ultratop Flanders) | 42 |
| Belgian Albums (Ultratop Wallonia) | 69 |
| Brazilian Albums (ABPD) | 20 |
| Dutch Albums (Album Top 100) | 25 |
| German Albums (Offizielle Top 100) | 35 |
| Italian Albums (FIMI) | 30 |
| Mexican Albums (Top 100 Mexico) | 67 |
| New Zealand Albums (RMNZ) | 26 |
| Polish Albums (ZPAV) | 19 |
| Swiss Albums (Schweizer Hitparade) | 41 |
| UK Albums (OCC) | 32 |
| US Billboard 200 | 169 |
| US Catalog Albums (Billboard) | 13 |
| Worldwide Albums (IFPI) | 28 |

2012 year-end chart performance for Back to Black
| Chart (2012) | Position |
|---|---|
| Belgian Albums (Ultratop Flanders) | 86 |
| Dutch Albums (Album Top 100) | 76 |
| Italian Albums (FIMI) | 73 |
| UK Albums (OCC) | 148 |
| US Catalog Albums (Billboard) | 44 |

2015 year-end chart performance for Back to Black
| Chart (2015) | Position |
|---|---|
| Italian Albums (FIMI) | 92 |
| UK Albums (OCC) | 62 |

2016 year-end chart performance for Back to Black
| Chart (2016) | Position |
|---|---|
| Italian Albums (FIMI) | 96 |
| Polish Albums (ZPAV) | 32 |
| UK Albums (OCC) | 46 |
| US Catalog Albums (Billboard) | 35 |

2017 year-end chart performance for Back to Black
| Chart (2017) | Position |
|---|---|
| UK Albums (OCC) | 76 |

2018 year-end chart performance for Back to Black
| Chart (2018) | Position |
|---|---|
| UK Albums (OCC) | 80 |

2019 year-end chart performance for Back to Black
| Chart (2019) | Position |
|---|---|
| Belgian Albums (Ultratop Flanders) | 40 |
| Belgian Albums (Ultratop Wallonia) | 123 |
| Polish Albums (ZPAV) | 70 |
| UK Albums (OCC) | 96 |
| US Top Alternative Albums (Billboard) | 49 |

2020 year-end chart performance for Back to Black
| Chart (2020) | Position |
|---|---|
| Belgian Albums (Ultratop Flanders) | 49 |
| Belgian Albums (Ultratop Wallonia) | 84 |
| Irish Albums (IRMA) | 50 |
| UK Albums (OCC) | 66 |
| US Top Alternative Albums (Billboard) | 47 |

2021 year-end chart performance for Back to Black
| Chart (2021) | Position |
|---|---|
| Belgian Albums (Ultratop Flanders) | 37 |
| Belgian Albums (Ultratop Wallonia) | 89 |
| UK Albums (OCC) | 54 |
| US Top Alternative Albums (Billboard) | 33 |

2022 year-end chart performance for Back to Black
| Chart (2022) | Position |
|---|---|
| Australian Albums (ARIA) | 99 |
| Belgian Albums (Ultratop Flanders) | 51 |
| Belgian Albums (Ultratop Wallonia) | 116 |
| Dutch Albums (Album Top 100) | 39 |
| UK Albums (OCC) | 86 |

2023 year-end chart performance for Back to Black
| Chart (2023) | Position |
|---|---|
| Belgian Albums (Ultratop Flanders) | 66 |
| Belgian Albums (Ultratop Wallonia) | 119 |
| Dutch Albums (Album Top 100) | 54 |

2024 year-end chart performance of Back to Black
| Chart (2024) | Position |
|---|---|
| Belgian Albums (Ultratop Flanders) | 43 |
| Belgian Albums (Ultratop Wallonia) | 61 |
| Dutch Albums (Album Top 100) | 19 |
| German Albums (Offizielle Top 100) | 83 |
| Swiss Albums (Schweizer Hitparade) | 52 |
| UK Albums (OCC) | 47 |

2025 year-end chart performance of Back to Black
| Chart (2025) | Position |
|---|---|
| Belgian Albums (Ultratop Flanders) | 51 |
| Belgian Albums (Ultratop Wallonia) | 109 |
| Dutch Albums (Album Top 100) | 31 |
| UK Albums (OCC) | 86 |

=== Decade-end charts ===
2000s decade-end chart performance for Back to Black
| Chart (2000–2009) | Position |
|---|---|
| UK Albums (OCC) | 3 |

2010s decade-end chart performance for Back to Black
| Chart (2010–2019) | Position |
|---|---|
| UK Albums (OCC) | 54 |
| UK Vinyl Albums (OCC) | 2 |

== Certifications and sales ==
Certifications for Back to Black
| Region | Certification | Certified units/sales |
|---|---|---|
| Argentina (CAPIF) | Gold | 20,000^{^} |
| Australia (ARIA) | 6× Platinum | 420,000^{‡} |
| Austria (IFPI Austria) | 7× Platinum | 210,000^{*} |
| Belgium (BRMA) | 3× Platinum | 150,000^{*} |
| Brazil (Pro-Música Brasil) | Diamond | 250,000^{*} |
| Canada (Music Canada) | Platinum | 100,000^{^} |
| Denmark (IFPI Danmark) | 9× Platinum | 180,000^{‡} |
| Finland (Musiikkituottajat) | Platinum | 33,884 |
| France (SNEP) | 2× Platinum | 1,140,000 |
| Germany (BVMI) | 6× Platinum | 1,200,000^{^} |
| Greece (IFPI Greece) | Platinum | 15,000^{^} |
| Hungary (MAHASZ) | Platinum | 6,000^{^} |
| Italy sales in 2008 | — | 100,000 |
| Italy (FIMI) sales + streams since 2009 | 5× Platinum | 250,000^{‡} |
| Japan (RIAJ) | Gold | 100,000^{^} |
| Netherlands (NVPI) | 2× Platinum | 140,000^{^} |
| New Zealand (RMNZ) | 7× Platinum | 105,000^{‡} |
| Norway (IFPI Norway) | Platinum | 40,000^{*} |
| Poland (ZPAV) | 2× Platinum | 40,000^{*} |
| Portugal (AFP) | 2× Platinum | 40,000^{^} |
| Portugal (AFP) re-release | Gold | 3,500^{‡} |
| Russia (NFPF) | 2× Platinum | 40,000^{*} |
| Spain (Promusicae) | 7× Platinum | 560,000^{^} |
| Sweden (GLF) | Platinum | 40,000^{^} |
| Switzerland (IFPI Switzerland) | 7× Platinum | 210,000^{^} |
| Turkey (Mü-Yap) | Gold | 5,000^{*} |
| United Kingdom (BPI) | 15× Platinum | 4,663,829 |
| United States (RIAA) | 2× Platinum | 2,000,000^{^} / 3,000,000 |
Summaries
| Europe (IFPI) | 8× Platinum | 8,000,000^{*} |
| Worldwide | — | 20,000,000 |
^{*} Sales figures based on certification alone.^{^} Shipments figures based on certification alone.^{‡} Sales+streaming figures based on certification alone.

== Release history ==
Release history for Back to Black
| Region | Date | Edition | Label | Ref. |
|---|---|---|---|---|
| Ireland | 27 October 2006 | Standard | Island | |
| United Kingdom | 30 October 2006 | Standard | Island | |
| Poland | 20 November 2006 | Standard | Universal | |
| Germany | 21 November 2006 | Standard | Universal | |
| Canada | 12 December 2006 | Standard | Universal | |
| France | 28 January 2007 | Standard | Universal | |
| Italy | 2 February 2007 | Standard | Universal | |
| Australia | 24 February 2007 | Standard | Universal | |
| United States | 13 March 2007 | Standard | Universal Republic | |
| Germany | 15 June 2007 | Limited | Universal | |
| Netherlands | 13 July 2007 | Limited | Universal | |
| Japan | 5 September 2007 | Standard | Universal | |
| Canada | 13 November 2007 | Deluxe | Universal | |
| Australia | 17 November 2007 | Deluxe | Universal | |
| Ireland | 23 November 2007 | Deluxe | Island | |
| Germany | 30 November 2007 | Deluxe | Universal | |
| United Kingdom | 3 December 2007 | Deluxe | Island | |
| Japan | 6 February 2008 | Deluxe | Universal | |
| Italy | 29 February 2008 | Deluxe | Universal | |

== See also ==
- Amy Winehouse: Back to Black (2018)
- Back to Black (2024)
- List of European number-one hits of 2008
- List of number-one albums of 2007 (Poland)
- List of number-one albums of 2008 (Ireland)
- List of number-one albums of 2008 (New Zealand)
- List of number-one albums of 2008 (Spain)
- List of number-one albums of 2011 (Poland)
- List of number-one hits of 2007 (France)
- List of number-one hits of 2008 (Austria)
- List of number-one hits of 2008 (Germany)
- List of number-one hits of 2011 (Austria)
- List of number-one hits of 2011 (Germany)
- List of number-one hits of 2011 (Italy)
- List of number-one hits of 2011 (Switzerland)
- List of UK Albums Chart number ones of the 2000s
- List of UK Albums Chart number ones of the 2010s
- List of best-selling albums
- List of best-selling albums by women
- List of best-selling albums in the United Kingdom
