= You Know I'm No Good =

2007 single by Amy Winehouse

- CD single cover

Single by Amy Winehouse

from the album Back to Black
- B-side: "Monkey Man"
- Released: 8 January 2007
- Recorded: 2006
- Studio: Daptone (New York City); Chung King (New York City); Metropolis (London)
- Genre: Blues; hip-hop; soul
- Length: 4:16 (album version); 3:36 (radio edit)
- Label: Island
- Songwriter: Amy Winehouse
- Producer: Mark Ronson

Amy Winehouse singles chronology
"Rehab" (2006)	"You Know I'm No Good" (2007)	"Back to Black" (2007)

Alternative cover
- Maxi CD single and digital EP cover

Music video
- "You Know I'm No Good" on YouTube

"You Know I'm No Good" is a song written and performed by the English singer Amy Winehouse from her second and final studio album, Back to Black (2006). "You Know I'm No Good" was released as the second single from Back to Black on 8 January 2007. Originally recorded as a solo track, it was remixed with guest vocals from the Wu-Tang Clan member Ghostface Killah. The original appeared on Winehouse's album, while the version with Ghostface Killah appears on his album More Fish. On the recap of The Best Songs of 2007 by Entertainment Weekly magazine, this song ranked at number two.

== Music video ==
The music video, directed by Phil Griffin (who also directed the video for her previous hit "Rehab"), was released to music channels in late November 2006. The video features Winehouse in numerous settings including a bar, a bedroom, and a bathtub. The plot is based around Winehouse's fictional character's relationship with the male character in the video. Video was shot by director of photography Adam Frisch and the sets were built at 3 Mills Studios in East London.

The video premiered on VH1 during the weekend of 3 March 2007. Following its VH1 premiere, it was placed on MTV's Big 10 rotation as of 5 March 2007 and was premiered on TRL the same day. The song was heard on a sneak preview of AMC's original series Mad Men.

== Release ==
The single was released in the UK on 8 January 2007. The track made it onto BBC Radio 1's A-list playlist. A UK edit of the remix featuring Ghostface Killah was also sent to radio, and to download services, and the original full-length US version, featuring Ghostface Killah name-checking Kelly Clarkson amongst others, also received airplay in the United States, where it was added to numerous Rhythmic radio stations.

Following Winehouse's success at the 50th Grammy Awards, the song was re-released in the US in mid-February 2008.

A documentary film based on the life and death of Winehouse was released, Amy (2015) and a performance of Winehouse performing "You Know I'm No Good" at 45th at Night, in 2007 was featured.

For the 20th anniversary of Back to Black in 2026, an original demo of "You Know I'm No Good", titled "I'm No Good (You Know I'm No Good – Original Demo)", was included on the expanded edition of the album, released on 23 October 2026. The recording appeared on the second disc, alongside other previously unreleased demos, alternative versions and B-sides from the album's recording period.

== Reception ==
Critical response to the single was positive. For the week of 16 January 2007, the track was chosen as the Single of the Week on the US iTunes Store as a free download. Newsweek also chose the song as its Pick of the Week for 15 January of the same year. Billboard found that the track—"in original form—could be no better"; however, it acknowledged that the Ghostface Killah remix added a "ferocious discordant sputter at the midsection." People magazine called the track "instantly memorable." Prior to this, Winehouse had not seen any success in the US, as her debut album Frank was not released there until November 2007. On the Billboard Hot 100, "You Know I'm No Good" debuted at number 91 spot ahead of "Rehab", which also debuted on the chart the same week. The single peaked on the UK Singles Chart at number 18 for the week ending 14 January 2007 in an excellent week for Winehouse that saw Back to Black achieve a new UK peak of number one, previous single "Rehab" return to the UK top 20, and Frank re-enter the UK chart at number 62 more than three years after its first release. To date, the single, which spent a total of 11 consecutive weeks on the UK Singles Chart, has sold 53,272 copies in the UK.

Winehouse performed the song at the 50th Annual Grammy Awards ceremony while in London, along with her hit single "Rehab". The performance was broadcast internationally via satellite. The song's performance on the awards ceremony subsequently led to an increase in digital downloads, notably on iTunes, where the song re-entered the Top Songs chart at number 55 in the United States. This resulted in a new peak for the song on the Billboard Hot 100, of number 77, one spot ahead of its previous peak. Arctic Monkeys performed a cover of the song on their 2007 tour.

A remix by Ghostface Killah appears on the reissue of Back to Black, featuring one verse by Ghostface, and a second remix, featuring more Ghostface verses, appears on his album More Fish.

English actor Roger Moore jokingly said he had no idea why Winehouse chose to include him in the lyrics, unless she wanted a word that rhymed with "door", or could not find one that rhymed with "Connery".

Following her death, the song re-entered the UK Singles Chart at number 37.

== Track listings ==
- UK CD 1
1. "You Know I'm No Good" (radio edit) – 3:36
2. "To Know Him Is to Love Him" (NapsterLive Session)
- UK CD 2
1. "You Know I'm No Good" – 4:16
2. "Monkey Man"
3. "You Know I'm No Good" (Skeewiff Mix)
- European CD single
1. "You Know I'm No Good" – 4:16
2. "You Know I'm No Good" (radio edit) – 3:36

"You Know I'm No Good" (featuring Ghostface Killah)

1. "You Know I'm No Good" (Skeewiff Mix)
- German 12-inch promotional single

A1. "You Know I'm No Good" (Skeewiff Mix)
A2. "You Know I'm No Good" – 4:16
A3. "You Know I'm No Good" (Instrumental) – 4:16
B1. "You Know I'm No Good" (Ghostface Killah Version)
B2. "You Know I'm No Good" (Fettes Brot Remix)
B3. "You Know I'm No Good" (A Cappella)

- US 12-inch single (Universal Republic B0008491-11)

A1. "You Know I'm No Good" – (radio edit) – 3:36
A2. "You Know I'm No Good" (featuring Ghostface Killah) – 3:22
B1. "Rehab" – 3:32
B2. "Rehab" (Hot Chip Remix) – 6:58

- Digital download – Remixes & B-Sides EP (2015)
1. "You Know I'm No Good" (featuring Ghostface Killah) (Ghostface UK Version) – 3:23
2. "You Know I'm No Good" (Skeewiff Mix) – 5:45
3. "You Know I'm No Good" – 4:16
4. "You Know I'm No Good" (Vodafone Live at TBA) – 4:21
5. "You Know I'm No Good" (Fettes Brot Remix) – 3:52

== Charts ==
=== Weekly charts ===
2007–2008 weekly chart performance for "You Know I'm No Good"
Chart (2007–2008)	Peak position
Austria (Ö3 Austria Top 40)	50
Belgium (Ultratip Bubbling Under Flanders)	2
Belgium (Ultratip Bubbling Under Wallonia)	19
Canada (Canadian Hot 100)	54
Canadian Digital Song Sales (Billboard) Remix	37
Denmark (Tracklisten)	23
European Hot 100 Singles (Billboard)	47
France (SNEP)	17
Germany (GfK)	77
Ireland (IRMA)	39
Mexico (Top 20 – Inglés)	12
Netherlands (Tipparade)	2
Netherlands (Single Top 100)	40
Norway (VG-lista) Remix	12
Romania (Romanian Top 100)	39
Scottish Singles Sales (Official Charts)	24
Slovakia Airplay (ČNS IFPI)	29
Switzerland (Schweizer Hitparade)	7
UK Singles (Official Charts)	18
UK Hip Hop/R&B (Official Charts)	1
US Billboard Hot 100	77
US Adult Alternative Airplay (Billboard)	2
US Hot R&B/Hip-Hop Songs (Billboard)	87

2011 weekly chart performance for "You Know I'm No Good"
Chart (2011)	Peak position
Australia (ARIA)	89
France (SNEP)	34
Germany (GfK)	71
Netherlands (Single Top 100)	27
Scottish Singles Sales (Official Charts)	45
Spain (Promusicae)	48
Switzerland (Schweizer Hitparade)	24
UK Singles (Official Charts)	37
UK Hip Hop/R&B (Official Charts)	17
US R&B/Hip-Hop Digital Song Sales (Billboard) Remix	17

=== Year-end charts ===
2007 year-end chart performance for "You Know I'm No Good"
Chart (2007)	Position
UK Singles (OCC)	107

2008 year-end chart performance for "You Know I'm No Good"
Chart (2008)	Position
Switzerland (Schweizer Hitparade)	53

== Certifications ==
Certifications and sales for "You Know I'm No Good"
Region	Certification	Certified units/sales
Denmark (IFPI Danmark)	Platinum	90,000^{‡}
Germany (BVMI)	Gold	150,000^{‡}
Italy (FIMI)	Gold	25,000^{‡}
New Zealand (RMNZ)	2× Platinum	60,000^{‡}
Spain (Promusicae)	Platinum	60,000^{‡}
Switzerland (IFPI Switzerland)	Platinum	30,000^{^}
United Kingdom (BPI)	Platinum	600,000^{‡}
United States	—	729,000
^{^} Shipments figures based on certification alone.^{‡} Sales+streaming figures based on certification alone.

== Release history ==
Release dates and formats for "You Know I'm No Good"
Region	Date	Format(s)	Label(s)	Ref.
United Kingdom	8 January 2007	CD; maxi CD	Island	
United States	13 February 2007	12-inch vinyl	Universal Republic	
Germany	11 May 2007	CD; maxi CD	Universal Music	
France	21 January 2008	CD	AZ	

== The Rolling Stones version ==
The Rolling Stones covered the song on their 2026 album Foreign Tongues.

=== Charts ===
Chart performance
Chart (2026)	Peak position
Uruguay Anglo Airplay (Monitor Latino)	13
