= Good for the Soul (album) =

Studio album by Dionne Bromfield
- Released: 4 July 2011
- Genres: R&B; soul; neo soul
- Length: 52:13 (standard edition); 78:09 (deluxe edition)
- Labels: Lioness Records, Island Records

Dionne Bromfield chronology
Introducing Dionne Bromfield (2009)	Good for the Soul (2011)

Singles from Good for the Soul
- 1. "Yeah Right" Released: 21 February 2011; 2. "Foolin'" Released: 17 June 2011; 3. "Spinnin' for 2012" Released: 23 September 2011

Professional ratings
Review scores
Source	Rating
Allmusic	3.5/5 stars
BBC	(positive)
The Guardian	3/5 stars
NME	(negative)
The Daily Telegraph	3/5 stars

Good for the Soul is the second album from English singer Dionne Bromfield. It was released on 4 July 2011 in the United Kingdom. The album was preceded by two singles, "Yeah Right" and "Foolin'".

== Singles ==
Though not the lead single, "Good for the Soul" was released as a double a-side 7" vinyl promo with "Time Will Tell" on 5 January 2011.

"Yeah Right" was released as the album's lead single, which features Diggy Simmons. It was released on 21 February 2011, and peaked at number 36 on the UK Singles Chart.

"Foolin'" was released as the album's second single. The track features Lil Twist and was released on 17 June 2011. It did well in Bulgaria, reaching number eight in the top 40.

"Spinnin' for 2012", which features Tinchy Stryder, was released as the third single from the album on 23 September 2011. It will also serve as the official 2012 Summer Olympics torch relay theme song, as announced on 1 July 2011. The lyrics for the song, originally written and recorded by Speech Debelle, have been re-written by Tinchy and Bromfield.

A remix of "Ouch That Hurt", renamed "Ouch" and featuring Mz Bratt, was released as a promotional single for the 2011 film Demons Never Die on 17 October 2011. A music video was made to accompany the track, and it was directed by filmmaker Arjun Rose, who also wrote and directed the film.

"We've revamped the tune a bit as it's featuring in a new Brit horror film called Demons Never Die." - Bromfield.

== Track listing ==
No.	Title	Writer(s)	Producer(s)	Length
1.	"Yeah Right" (featuring Diggy Simmons)	Francis White	Paul O'Duffy	4:05
2.	"Good for the Soul"	Steve Booker, Dionne Bromfield	Steve Booker	3:56
3.	"Sweetest Thing"	Booker, Bromfield	Steve Booker	3:44
4.	"Foolin'" (featuring Lil Twist)	White, Bromfield	Paul O'Duffy	3:13
5.	"Too Soon to Call It Love"	Booker, Bromfield	Steve Booker	4:01
6.	"Ouch That Hurt"	Colin Campsie, Mads Hauge, Phil Thornalley	Mads Hauge, Phil Thornalley	2:52
7.	"If That's the Way You Wanna Play"	Paul O'Duffy, Bromfield	Paul O'Duffy	3:34
8.	"A Little Love"	Bromfield, Ina Wroldsen, Josef Svedlund, Andreas Romdhane	Quiz & Larossi	3:19
9.	"Time Will Tell"	Booker, Bromfield, Wayne Hector	Steve Booker	3:32
10.	"Get Over It"	Bromfield, Hauge, Thornalley	Mads Hauge, Phil Thornalley	3:34
11.	"Remember Our Love"	O'Duffy, Bromfield	Paul O'Duffy	3:37
12.	"In Your Own World"	Gregg Pagani, Lance Tolbert, Lauren Evans, Bromfield	Gregg Pagani	3:55
13.	"Don't Make It True"	Booker, Hector, Bromfield	Steve Booker	3:41
14.	"Move a Little Faster"	Howie Payne, Jimmy Hogarth	Jimmy Hogarth	3:01
15.	"Spinnin' for 2012" (with Tinchy Stryder [UK Bonus Track])	Michael Lewis Lindsay, Speech Debelle, Dwayne Jason Richards, Patrick Marks, Kwasi Danquah III & TMS	TMS	2:52

iTunes Deluxe edition bonus tracks
No.	Title	Writer(s)	Producer(s)	Length
15.	"Lost In Love"	Booker, Bromfield		3:05
16.	"Spinnin' for 2012" (with Tinchy Stryder)	Lindsay, Elliott, Richards, Marks, Danquah & TMS	TMS	2:52
17.	"Yeah Right" (Live)			3:46
18.	"Good for the Soul" (Live)			3:52
19.	"Sweetest Thing" (Live)			3:44
20.	"Foolin'" (Live)			3:27
21.	"Get Over It" (Live)			3:11
22.	"Yeah Right" (Music video)			4:13

== Charts ==
Chart (2011–2012)	Peak position
Swiss Albums Chart	96
UK Albums Chart	53

== Release history ==
Region	Date	Label
United Kingdom	4 July 2011	Lioness Records
Brazil	18 September 2011	Universal Music
