= Foolin' (Dionne Bromfield song) =

Single by Dionne Bromfield featuring Lil Twist

from the album Good for the Soul
- Released: 17 June 2011
- Genre: Soul, Hip Hop
- Length: 3:27 (Radio Edit) (feat. Lil Twist); 3:11 (Album Version Edit); 3:28 (Original Version) (feat. Lil Twist); 3:12 (Original Version Edit)
- Label: Lioness, Island
- Songwriter(s): Dionne Bromfield, Eg White
- Producer(s): White

Dionne Bromfield singles chronology
"Yeah Right" (2011)	"Foolin'" (2011)

Music video
- "Foolin'" on YouTube

"Foolin'" is the second single from British singer Dionne Bromfield's second studio album, Good for the Soul. The song features American rapper Lil Twist and was released 5 June 2011 and a new release 7 July 2011. It reached 7 on the Bulgarian Top 40, however it failed to enter the UK Singles Chart.

== Music video ==
The music video was filmed in the United Kingdom by UK director Trudy Bellinger.

Dionne Bromfield in the scene where she is sitting by a swimming pool in the music video for "Foolin".

=== Synopsis ===
The scenes in the video sees Bromfield with three different alter ego's sitting on chairs in a Bar before the scene switches to her sitting by a swimming pool, where she is later accompanied by a male.

The video also features Chris and Wes, winners of the 2011 season of Sky1's show Got to Dance, as her backup dancers.

In just over three weeks, the video went past one million views on YouTube, making it Bromfield's most-viewed video to date. It was uploaded to YouTube on 18 May 2011 at a total length of three minutes and twenty-two seconds.

== Track listings and formats ==
CD single
No.	Title	Length
1.	"Foolin" (Original Version feat. Lil Twist)	3:29
2.	"Foolin" (Original Version)	3:13
Total length:		06:43

Digital bundle – New Release
No.	Title	Length
1.	"Foolin" (Radio Edit UK Album Version feat. Lil Twist)	3:27
2.	"Foolin" (Seamus Haji Remix)	3:37
3.	"Foolin" (Bellatrax Remix)	3:12
4.	"Foolin" (UK Album Version Edit)	3:11
Total length:		13:27

Digital bundle – First Release (7digital.com)
No.	Title	Length
1.	"Foolin" (Radio Edit Original Version feat. Lil Twist)	3:28
2.	"Foolin" (Seamus Haji Remix)	3:37
3.	"Foolin" (Bellatrax Remix)	3:12
4.	"Foolin" (Original Version Edit)	3:12
Total length:		13:29

== Chart performance ==
Chart	Peak position
UK Radio Airplay	25
Bulgaria Top 40	7

== Release history ==
Region	Date	Format	Label
United Kingdom	17 June 2011	Digital download	Lioness Records
