= Spinnin' for 2012 =

Single by Dionne Bromfield and Tinchy Stryder

from the album Good for the Soul
- Released: 23 September 2011
- Recorded: 2011
- Genre: Pop-rap; bass; soul
- Length: 2:52
- Label: Lioness Records & Universal Island Records
- Songwriters: Dionne Bromfield, Kwasi Danquah III, Corynne Elliott

Music video
- "Spinnin' for 2012" on YouTube

"Spinnin' for 2012" is a song by British soul singer-songwriter Dionne Bromfield and rapper Tinchy Stryder. It was released on 23 September 2011 to Amazon and iTunes as a digital download in the United Kingdom. It is the Official Olympic Torch Relay Song for the London 2012 Olympic Games. The song appears on Bromfield's album Good for the Soul.

== Background ==
The song is a reworked version of a Speech Debelle original, with both Stryder and Bromfield rewriting the track's lyrics. Joking about being unsuccessful in obtaining Olympic 2012 tickets, Stryder told The Sun: "I didn't get any tickets in the end, like loads of other people. I tried but had no luck. I'm hoping that this song will get us a few, though." He went on to say, "I must be in with a chance, surely. I'm desperate to see some of the events. It will be massive. I'd love to watch the men's 100m final."

== Live performances ==
Dionne Bromfield and Tinchy Stryder performed the song live on ITV entertainment programme Born to Shine. The song was also scheduled to be performed on another ITV program Lorraine on Tuesday, 27 September 2011, but this did not proceed.

== Music video ==
The music video was filmed in London, UK by US director Dale "Rage" Resteghini, who is also known to be the favorite music video director for Soulja Boy. The video was premiered on Dionne Bromfield's YouTube channel on Thursday, 21 July 2011, at a total length of two minutes and fifty-six seconds.

=== Synopsis ===
The video sees Tinchy Stryder and Dionne Bromfield in a black colored Mini Convertible driving around City of London and past Tower Bridge, then the scene switches to them both in a dark place, standing on a stage, where Bromfield and Stryder begin to dance on the stage surrounded by lighted torches. Bromfield is first dressed in a Union Jack decorated sleeveless shirt, before later having a change of clothing, she then proceeds to sing, with Stryder following up with pop rap rhymes over post-dubstep beats about success, he leaves out multisyllabic rhymes in this song in order to accommodate the purpose of the song. The last scene in the video sees Bromfield in two different outfits singing in front of dancers in front of a wall, then Stryder reappears in the scene and him and Bromfield strike a pose, before dap greeting, then proceeding back to the black colored Mini Convertible and driving away.

== Track listing ==
Digital single
No.	Title	Length
1.	"Spinnin' for 2012" (Radio Version)	2:52
2.	"Spinnin' for 2012" (Extended Rap Version)	2:52
Total length:		5:04

Digital EP
No.	Title	Length
1.	"Spinnin' for 2012" (Radio Version)	2:52
2.	"Ouch That Hurt" (Live)	2:55
3.	"Get Over It" (Live)	3:13
4.	"Spinnin' for 2012" (Extended Rap Version)	2:52
Total length:		11:52

== Release history ==
Region	Date	Format	Label
United Kingdom	23 September 2011	Digital Download	Lioness Records & Universal Island Records
Ireland	23 September 2011	Digital Download	Lioness Records & Universal Island Records
