= Willie Denson =

American singer

Willie Denson (23 November 1936 in Columbus, Georgia – 1 July 2006) was an American songwriter, most notably for the Shirelles, and a singer under the name Denny Denson.

He wrote or co-wrote with Luther Dixon five songs for the Shirelles, including "Mama Said," a number 4 hit, "Stop the Music," "The Things I Want to Hear (Pretty Words)," "Love Is a Swingin' Thing," and "Blue Holiday." His own singles as Denny Denson including "Too Long" / "Bills" (1962). In 2001, Denson won $3 million in the Georgia lottery. He died of lung cancer on 1 July 2006, at age 69.
