= Jeremy Marre =

British film director (1943–2020)

Jeremy Marre (7 October 1943 – 15 March 2020) was an English television director, writer and producer who founded Harcourt Films and made films around the world. Much of his work focused on musical subjects.

His reputation was made with the Beats of the Heart series, which introduced elements of what is now called world music, and its performers, to the Western world. Rhythms of Resistance, a film in the series, was where Paul Simon first saw Ladysmith Black Mambazo, who played a prominent role on Simon's Graceland album. The New York Times said of Beats of the Heart: "It can make your jaw drop regularly with astonishment." He has run director courses for the National Film and Television School, sat on the advisory boards for the British Library Sound Archive and the Arts Council of England, has broadcast widely on BBC radio, has written for The Times, New York Post and The Independent.

There have been retrospectives of his music films at the Florence Film Festival and on Channel 4.

In 2016, Marre was the first recipient of a new lifetime achievement award bestowed jointly by Arizona State University and Arizona Humanities.

== Biography ==
Marre grew up and was educated in London. He read law and began training as a lawyer, before studying film at the Slade School and the Royal College of Art. He was married with two sons.

== Career ==
In 1986, the New York Times wrote: “Somehow, the director Jeremy Marre manages to document musical events that most outsiders wouldn't even hear about, much less be allowed to attend.”

Marre's most recent completed work is a profile of Count Basie in 2019. In 2018, he directed Amy Winehouse: Back to Black, first shown on BBC4. In his review for The Arts Desk, Mark Kidel wrote of the film: "Jeremy Marre has consistently been making first-class music documentaries since the 1970’s: he knows how to tell a story, and allows enough space for the music to speak for itself." Before that, Marre made Marc Bolan, "Cosmic Dancer", for BBC to mark the 40th anniversary of the singer's death. The film is described by the Sunday Times as "fascinatingly ambiguous" and premiered in the UK on Friday 15 September 2017.

Marre's previous film was the feature-length documentary, "The Heart of Country" a history of the Nashville music scene. In 2013, he produced and directed "Key to the Highway", telling the story of Blues legend Big Bill Broonzy with interviews from Keith Richards, Ray Davies and Pete Seeger.

"Youssou N'Dour: Voice of Africa" was first shown on BBC Four on Friday 30 August 2013. Before that, "Otis Redding: Soul Ambassador" was the first documentary on the life of the soul singer Otis Redding.

Marre also made "Angels and Demons: the Carlos Santana Story", a feature-length biography based around an intimate interview with Santana.

In 2011 he was responsible for the BBC's acclaimed Reggae Britannia, a history of reggae music in the UK, premiered in February 2011. The film won the UNESCO Award for best feature documentary at the Jamaica Reggae Festival 2011, jointly with Fire in Babylon.

On the death of Malcolm McLaren in 2010, Marre's tribute show was broadcast on BBC2. He has also produced the series Latin Music USA, a transatlantic co-production about the history of Latin American music and its influence on popular music in general.

Other highlights of his work in the last decade include directing a documentary on the American prison gang The Aryan Brotherhood; acting as series producer of the BBC Music series Soul Britannia examining the history and influence of soul music in Britain; writing and directing Marvin Gaye: What's Going On?, a biography for the PBS series American Masters and BBC; and The Real Phil Spector, a one-hour biography of the reclusive music producer recently found guilty of murder, for Channel 4.

Previously, Marre has worked with James Brown on Soul Survivor – The James Brown Story, a 90-minute biography featuring extended interviews, rehearsal, and performance by James Brown, also featuring Little Richard, Chuck D and Dan Aykroyd.

His award-winning documentary Ladyboys, was shown on Channel 4 and abroad. His 90-minute movie Rebel Music about the life of Bob Marley earned him a Grammy Award nomination (Bob Marley's first), as well as winning the CINE Golden Eagle prize.

Earlier work included the BAFTA nominated (2002) opening one-hour film for the BBC series Walk on By; an eight-hour Channel 4 series Chasing Rainbows, a part-dramatised story of British popular music and the 3-part series Nature of Music (Channel 4) about ritual and music around the world; Forbidden Image, with an original score by Ravi Shankar, for ITV.

Marre collaborated with Derek Bailey on the four-part Channel 4 series about musical improvisation around the world, On the Edge.

He has made several of the BBC series Classic Albums, worked with Gerald Durrell on a 12-part series entitled Ourselves and Other Animals, and written, produced and directed programmes for the South Bank Show which won the Milan Grand Prix and Golden Harp awards.

Beats of the Heart was his 14-hour series on world music that was networked several times on British television, accompanied by his book of the same name and 14 videos/DVDs. The films include Roots, Rock, Reggae (Jamaican music) and Rhythm of Resistance on black music as resistance to apartheid in South Africa. His work for cinema includes Way of the Sword and Soul of the Samurai.

=== Harcourt films ===
Harcourt Films is a UK-based independent television production company founded by Jeremy Marre.

Partial production filmography

- Beats of the Heart: Roots Rock Reggae (1977) (TV)
- Beats of the Heart: Salsa (1979) (TV)
- Beats of the Heart: Rhythm of Resistance (1979) (TV)
- Beats of the Heart: Chase the Devil – Religious Music of the Appalachian Mountains (1983) (TV)
- Beats of the Heart: Two Faces of Thailand – A Musical Portrait (1983)
- Beats of the Heart: Sukiyaki and Chips – The Japanese Sounds of Music (1984) (TV)
- Enemies of Silence (1991) (TV)
- On the Edge: Improvisation in Music – Nothin' Premeditated (1992) (TV)
- On the Edge: Improvisation in Music – A Liberating Thing (1992) (TV)
- On the Edge: Improvisation in Music – Movement in Time (1992) (TV)
- Ladyboys (1995) (TV)
- Grateful and the Dead (1996) (TV)
- Lie Detectors (1997) (TV)
- A Roll of the Dice: The Capeman on Broadway (1998) (TV)
