= Yeah Right (Dionne Bromfield song) =

Single by Dionne Bromfield featuring Diggy Simmons

from the album Good for the Soul
- Released: 21 February 2011
- Genre: Soul; neo soul
- Length: 3:31 min. (Radio Version); 4:05 min. (Album Version); 3:14 min. (No Rap Version)
- Label: Lioness; Island
- Songwriter: Eg White
- Producer: Paul O'Duffy

Dionne Bromfield singles chronology
"Ain't No Mountain High Enough" (2009)	"Yeah Right" (2011)	"Foolin'" (2011)

Diggy Simmons singles chronology
"Yeah Right" (2011)	"Copy, Paste" (2011)

Music video
- "Yeah Right" on YouTube

"Yeah Right" is a song by British singer Dionne Bromfield featuring American rapper Diggy Simmons released as the first single from her second album, Good for the Soul (2011).

== Background ==
"With 'Yeah Right', I just wanted to make something that was catchy, and write about something that we say in everyday life. This was the song that decided the direction of the album, because it created the exact vibe I was going for - old school for today's generation." - Bromfield.

== Music video ==
The music video was directed by Emil Nava (known also as a director of Jessie J's "Do It Like a Dude", "Price Tag" and "Nobody's Perfect").

=== Synopsis ===
It is set in a hotel where Bromfield contemplates her relationship, described in the song, with Simmons. She is seen in various rooms. Firstly, in the lobby getting her suitcase pulled in for her; then, she is in one of the bedrooms singing about what Diggy may have done.

She, then, makes her way into the hall, waves her hand in anger and starts dancing while two cleaners dance, as well. She has a change of clothes and makes her way to a dining hall where two moppers are mopping the floor and sits next to a piano.

In the next scene, she is in the bedroom with Diggy ignoring him and pushing him away. She is back to the first scene in the bedroom, then walks into the kitchen while the chefs start juggling and spinning kitchen utensils.

She is, then, in a main hall with all the workers dancing. Soon after, she makes it into the lobby while the bell boy and a man starts dancing. The bell boy shakes his head repetitively. They are back into the main hall. Throughout the second verse, Diggy is near a black car with two dancing women. One being Alternative artist FKA Twigs.

Emil stated in the behind-the-scenes video that the concept of the video is that Dionne injects life wherever she goes.

== Track listings and formats ==
Promo single
No.	Title	Length
1.	"Yeah Right" (Radio Edit - No Rap)	3:13

Digital bundle
No.	Title	Length
1.	"Yeah Right" (Radio Edit)	3:31
2.	"Yeah Right" (Club Junkies Remix - Radio Edit)	3:23
3.	"Yeah Right" (Dave Doyle Remix - Radio Edit)	3:12
4.	"Yeah Right" (Mario Basanov Remix - Radio Edit)	4:06
5.	"Yeah Right" (SoundBwoy Remix)	3:30
Total length:		17:42

== Charts ==
Chart (2011)	Peak position
Hungary (Rádiós Top 40)	20
UK Singles (Official Charts Company)	36
