= Mama Said (The Shirelles song) =

Single by the Shirelles

from the album the Shirelles Sing to Trumpets and Strings
- B-side: "Blue Holiday"
- Released: April 1961
- Studio: Bell Sound (New York City)
- Genre: R&B
- Length: 2:11
- Label: Scepter
- Songwriter(s): Luther Dixon, Willie Denson
- Producer(s): Luther Dixon

The Shirelles singles chronology
"Will You Love Me Tomorrow" (1960)	"Mama Said" (1961)	"A Thing of the Past" / "What a Sweet Thing That Was" (1961)

"Mama Said" is a song performed by the Shirelles, written by Luther Dixon and Willie Denson. It became a top-ten hit, on both the pop and R&B charts, when it was released as a single in 1961. "Mama Said" went number four on the Billboard Hot 100 and number two on the R&B chart and has been covered by American Spring, Melanie, Dusty Springfield, the Stereos, the Growlers, and a young Dionne Bromfield. It was also the inspiration for "Days Like This" by Van Morrison. Nick Lowe covered it on his 2001 album, The Convincer.

"Mama Said" was featured during the closing of the third season Orange is the New Black episode, "Fake it Till You Fake it Some More" and also appeared in the seventh season of Adventure Time at the end of the eponymous episode "Mama Said". In Canada, a version by Little Eva reached #96 in 1970.

Billboard named the song number 44 on their list of 100 Greatest Girl Group Songs of All Time.

== Charts ==
Chart (1961)	Peak position
Canada (CHUM Chart)	13
U.S. Billboard Hot 100	4
U.S. Billboard Hot R&B Sides	2

== Dionne Bromfield version ==
"Mama Said" was covered by Dionne Bromfield for her album Introducing (2009). It made number 43 on the UK Singles Chart.
