= Dionne Bromfield =

British singer (born 1996)

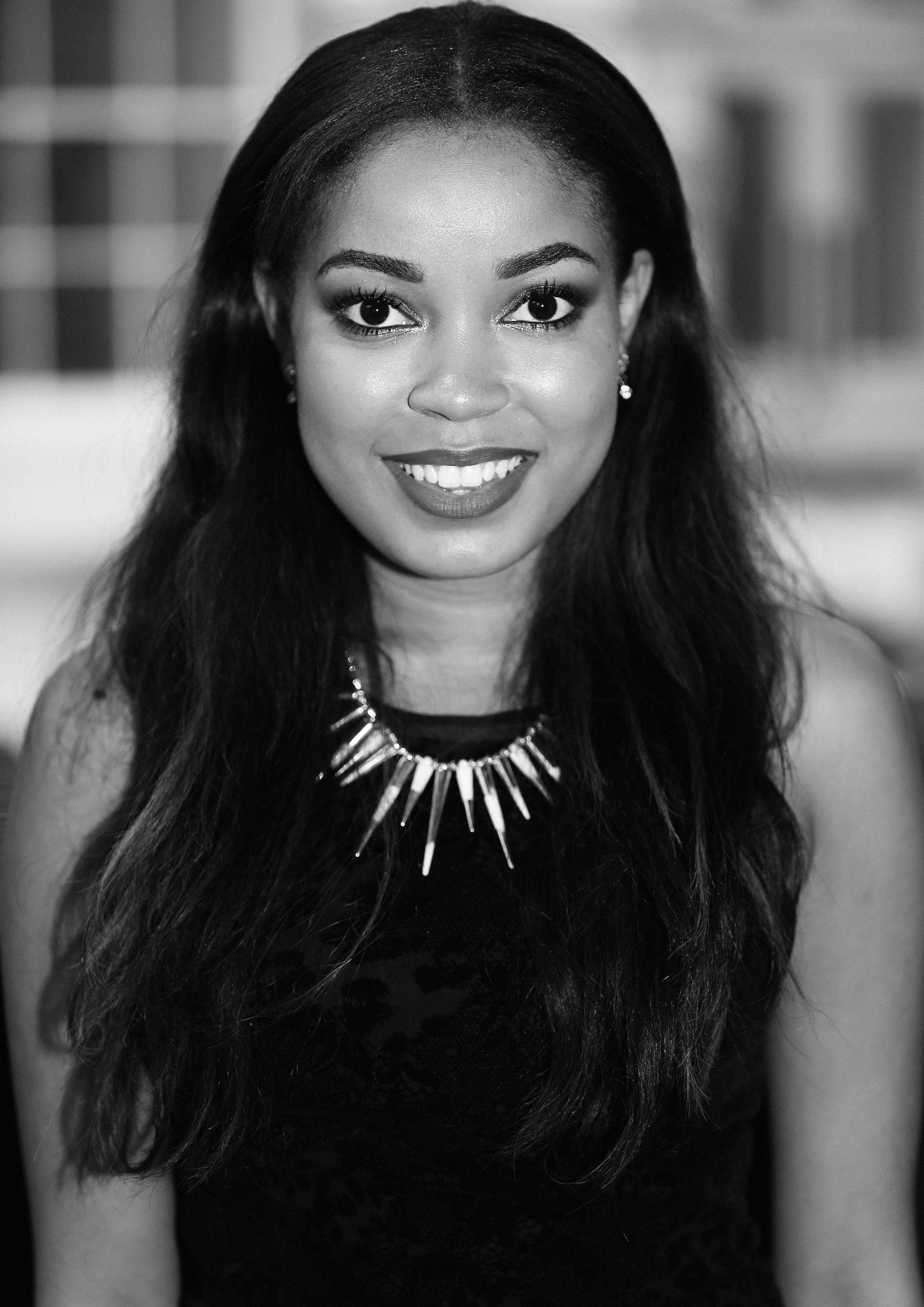
- Bromfield in 2013

Background information
- Born: Dionne Julia Bromfield; 1 February 1996 (age 30); Tower Hamlets, London, England
- Genres: Neo-soul, R&B
- Occupations: Singer; TV presenter; television personality
- Years active: 2009–present
- Labels: Lioness; Island; Universal Republic; Republic
- Website: dionnebromfieldmusic.com

Dionne Julia Bromfield (born 1 February 1996) is a British soul music singer, television presenter and television personality. Her debut album, Introducing Dionne Bromfield, was released in 2009 by Amy Winehouse's Lioness Records label.

She first came to public attention after performing on the British TV show Strictly Come Dancing with Amy Winehouse on backing vocals. On 15 July 2021, Bromfield released the single "Silly Love", nearly 10 years after the death of her godmother Amy Winehouse.

Between 2011 and 2014, she co-hosted CBBC magazine series Friday Download.

== Life and career ==
=== 1996–2009: Early life and musical beginnings ===
Bromfield was born on 1 February 1996 in Tower Hamlets, East London to an English mother and a Jamaican father. She has two brothers. Bromfield grew up in Chislehurst, South London, and attended Gatehouse School in Victoria Park, London and later Beaverwood School for Girls in Chislehurst until 2009. Bromfield first appeared on YouTube singing a cover of Alicia Keys song "If I Ain't Got You" with (her godmother) Amy Winehouse.

Bromfield attended the Sylvia Young Theatre School in Westminster.

In September 2009, Bromfield was the first artist to be signed to Winehouse's record label, Lioness Records. On 25 September 2009, Bromfield performed alongside Winehouse at the Prince's Trust End of the Summer Ball and, on 10 October, Bromfield performed a cover of The Shirelles' 1960s hit "Mama Said", while Winehouse appeared as a backing singer on the British television show Strictly Come Dancing.

=== 2009–2011: Introducing Dionne Bromfield and Good for the Soul ===
Her debut album, Introducing Dionne Bromfield, was released on 12 October 2009, and the first single, "Mama Said", was released on 3 November 2009. On 10 December 2010, Bromfield performed at the Young Voices concerts at the Manchester M.E.N. Arena, on 12 January 2011 in London at the O2 Arena and at the Motorpoint Arena in Sheffield. The album also features the song "Foolish Little Girl", as well as the second single, "Ain't No Mountain High Enough", which was released as a digital download featuring the b-side "I Saw Mummy Kissing Santa Claus". This album consisted of cover songs and contained no original material.

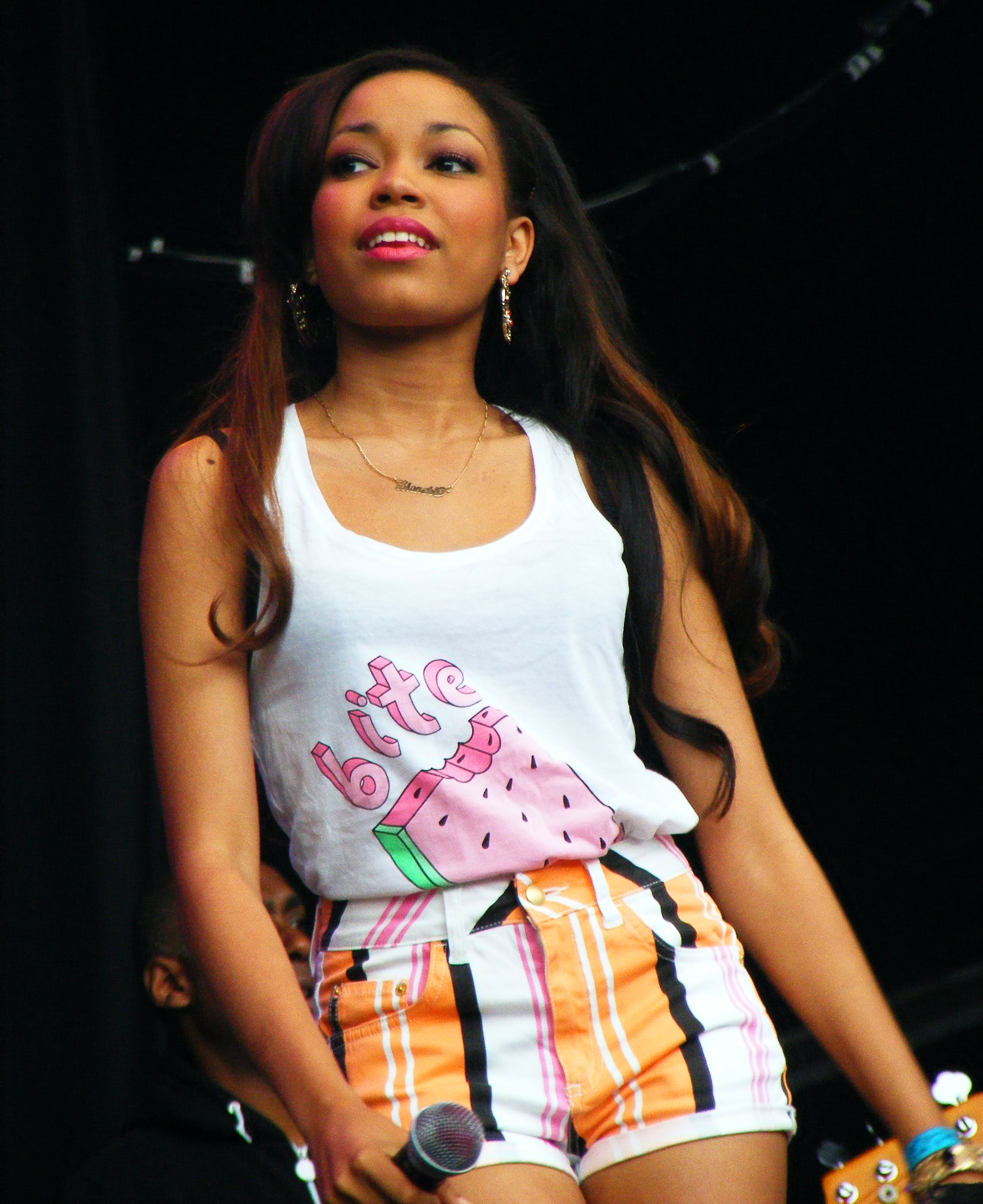
Bromfield performing at Bingley Music Live in 2011

On 28 January 2011, it was announced that Bromfield had recorded a new single called "Yeah Right", co-written with Eg White, which features Diggy Simmons. The single, which was released as a digital download on 4 March and peaked at number 36 in the UK Singles Chart, is the lead single from her second album Good for the Soul, which was released on 4 July 2011. The album is composed completely of original material, written by Bromfield and many songwriters. A second single featuring Lil Twist, "Foolin'", was released on 17 June. This album has been promoted by Bromfield appearing on television shows such as Blue Peter and Fern. Dionne has been the new face of Gio-Goi jeans since 2011.

Bromfield has uploaded two episodes of a web show with Will Manning called Down With Dionne on YouTube. Episode 1 – The first episode was uploaded to YouTube on 6 April 2011. In this episode, Will helps Bromfield hunt down her fashion favourites, and she performs an impromptu performance of her hit single "Yeah Right" on Oxford Street. Episode 2 – The second episode was uploaded to YouTube on 15 April 2011. In this episode, Bromfield is challenged to hunt the pockets of witting Londoners, she meets Jessie J, and Will does an Irish Jig.

It was announced that she would present a show called Friday Download on CBBC, which premiered from 6 May to 5 August. The 13-part series will address themes such as music, dance, TV, comedy, movies, and lifestyle. Bromfield said, "I did the audition and there were loads of well-known actresses auditioning, too. I didn't think I stood a chance. I'd forgotten all about it until my mum came in to tell me I'd got the job! I didn't believe her at first! It's so exciting, and I can't wait to get started!"

On 1 July 2011, Dionne Bromfield and Tinchy Stryder's collaboration, "Spinnin' for 2012", was confirmed as the first official song for the 2012 Summer Olympics. The lyrics for the song, originally written and recorded by Speech Debelle, have been re-written by Tinchy and Bromfield. The song was released 23 September 2011.

On 20 July 2011, while performing at London's Roundhouse with The Wanted, Bromfield was joined on stage by Amy Winehouse. This was Winehouse's last public performance before her death on 23 July 2011, aged 27. On 23 July, two hours after the announcement of Winehouse's death, Bromfield sang at Ponty's Big Weekend in Pontypridd, supporting The Wanted. Bromfield sang for 20 minutes, only slightly short of the scheduled half-hour set and left Wales immediately after the concert.

On 5 October 2011, in her first award nomination, Bromfield was nominated for Best R&B/Soul act, at the 2011 MOBO Awards (Music of Black Origin), as well as performing in the Amy Winehouse tribute, singing "Love Is A Losing Game" at the awards ceremony. On 17 October 2011, a remix of "Ouch That Hurt" – as featured on the soundtrack to the film Demons Never Die and featuring rapper Mz Bratt – was released in the UK.

On 24–26 January 2012, Bromfield performed for the first time outside the UK, at the Summer Soul Festival, at São Paulo and Rio de Janeiro, in Brazil. That was the same festival that on 2011 brought Winehouse to Brazil. Her song "Move A Little Faster", from her second studio album Good for the Soul, was featured as the opening track for the Hawaii Five-0 episode "Lapa'au" ("Healing").

=== 2012–present: Treat Me Right ===
Bromfield recorded a new track, named 'Black Butterfly', in honour of Amy Winehouse. She told Sunday Mirror, "I want to continue Amy's legacy. It's an awful lot of pressure but it's also a massive compliment to think that I can. I was the last person she was with on stage and automatically people felt like that was saying something... There was a black butterfly that flew in at Amy's funeral and it landed on Kelly Osbourne's shoulder. It stayed there for the whole service then flew out as soon as the service had finished. It's probably the best song I've ever written, and I was crying when I recorded it." Winehouse's father, Mitch Winehouse, has also written about seeing the same butterfly in Amy, My Daughter.

In November 2015, she supported US girl group Fifth Harmony on their UK gigs in London and Manchester.

In 2021, Bromfield featured in the documentary Amy Winehouse & Me: Dionne's Story in regard to the tenth anniversary of Amy Winehouse's death. She also released a single called Silly Love.

In 2026, she released single Green Light, writing on Instagram: "I love this one so much and hope you guys do too."

== Discography ==
=== Studio albums ===
Album Title	Album details	Chart positions
Album Title	Album details	UK
Introducing Dionne Bromfield	Released: 12 October 2009; Label: Lioness / Island (2720319); Formats: CD, Digital Download	33
Good for the Soul	Released: 4 July 2011; Label: Lioness / Island; Formats: CD, Digital Download	53

=== Singles ===
Year	Single	Chart positions			Album
Year	Single	UK	HUN	BULGARIA TOP 40	Album
2009	"Mama Said"	43	—	—	Introducing Dionne Bromfield
2009	"Ain't No Mountain High Enough" (feat. Zalon)	—	—	—	Introducing Dionne Bromfield
2011	"Yeah Right" (feat. Diggy Simmons)	36	20	—	Good for the Soul
2011	"Foolin'" (feat. Lil Twist)	—	—	7	Good for the Soul
2011	"Spinnin' for 2012" (with Tinchy Stryder)	—	—	—	Good for the Soul
2021	"Silly Love"	—	—	—	Non-album single

=== Other songs ===
Year	Single	Chart positions	Album
Year	Single	UK	Album
2009	"Foolish Little Girl"	—	Introducing Dionne Bromfield
2011	"Good for the Soul"	—	Good for the Soul
2011	"Get Up Offa That Thing"	—	non-album track

=== Soundtrack appearances ===
Year	Single	Chart positions	Movie
Year	Single	UK	Movie
2011	"Ouch" (feat. Mz Bratt)	—	Demons Never Die
2012	"Who Says You Can't Have It All"	—	StreetDance 2

== Videography ==
=== Music videos ===
List of music videos, showing year released and director
Title	Year	Director(s)	Artist(s)	Ref.
"Mama Said"	2009	Ben Jones	Dionne Bromfield	
"Foolish Little Girl"	2009	Jon Moon	Dionne Bromfield	
"Ain't No Mountain High Enough"	2009	Jon Moon	Dionne Bromfield (feat. Zalon)	
"Yeah Right"	2011	Emil Nava	Dionne Bromfield (feat. Diggy Simmons)	
"Foolin'"	2011	Trudy Bellinger	Dionne Bromfield	
"Spinnin' for 2012"	2011	Dale "Rage" Resteghini	Dionne Bromfield (with Tinchy Stryder)	
"Ouch"	2011	Arjun Rose	Dionne Bromfield (feat. Mz Bratt)	

== Filmography ==
Television
Year	Title	Role	Notes
2009	Strictly Come Dancing	Performer	Dionne Bromfield performed her 2009 single "Mama Said"
2011–2014	Friday Download	Co-presenter	Friday Download premiered as a 13-part series CBBC children television show from 6 May 2011 to 5 August 2011. Bromfield continued to present the show when it resumed on CBBC in 2012. The show had finished as of 2014.
2011	OK! TV	Guest and performer	Bromfield was interviewed by presenters Matt Johnson and Kate Walsh. She also performed her 2011 single "Yeah Right"
2011	Blue Peter	Performer	Bromfield performed her 2011 single "Yeah Right"
2011	Freshly Squeezed	Guest	Bromfield was interviewed by Matt Edmondson
2011	Fern	Guest and performer	Bromfield was interviewed by Fern Britton and performed her 2011 single "Yeah Right"
2011	Born to Shine	Performer	Bromfield and Tinchy Stryder performed their 2011 song and official 2012 Summer Olympics torch relay theme song, "Spinnin' for 2012"
2011	Lorraine	Guest	Bromfield was interviewed by Lorraine Kelly
2011	The Big Performance	Guest	
2011	Taniec z Gwiazdami	Performer	Bromfield performed her 2011 single "Foolin'"
2015	Up All Night	Dionne	
2021	Amy Winehouse & Me: Dionne's Story	Herself	MTV documentary commemorating the tenth anniversary of Amy Winehouse's passing.
2021	Backstage 2021	Herself	A 'Best of the Year' entertainment news clip show, hosted by Katie Spencer, broadcast over the festive period on Sky News. Bromfield was interviewed earlier in the year, by Sky News reporters, about her godmother at the Amy Winehouse exhibition.

== Awards and nominations ==
Year	Award	Category	Result	Ref
2011	MOBO Awards	Best R&B / Soul act	Nominated	

Year	Award	Category	Result	Ref
2012	BAFTA Awards	Best Children's Entertainment Programme	Won	
