= Zalon =

British musician and producer (born 1983)

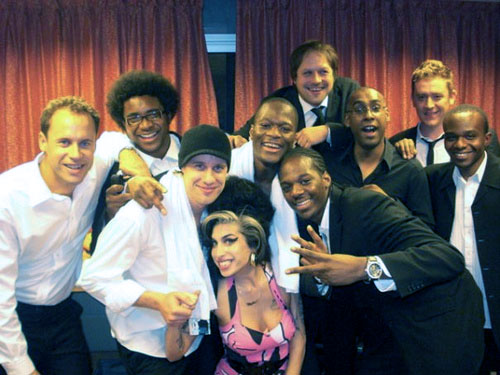
Zalon, fifth from left, with Amy Winehouse and her band backstage, 2007

Zalon Thompson (born 1 December 1983) is a British pop singer, songwriter and record producer. He is widely known for his backing vocals with Amy Winehouse on her Grammy Award-winning Back to Black album and tour.

== Early life ==
Born at Park Royal Hospital in London, Zalon Thompson, son of reggae singer Dr Alimantado and brother of fellow backing vocalist Heshima. Zalon attended Furness Primary School and then went to Hampstead School in Cricklewood to advance his education.

Zalon Thompson went to Hammersmith and West London College and studied Popular Music which covered all bases of the music industry and learned to play drums and guitar.

== Career ==
Zalon and his brother Heshima, then aged 16 and 20, began touring the UK live circuit with the American soul singer Freddie Lee as part of his production shows in 2003. Zalon has attributed his performance technique to these years of live performance with Freddie Lee. A few years later, promoter Patrick Alan approached Zalon to sing backing vocals and duets with his guests at his regular Monday night spot at the 10 Rooms, and through this Zalon met Amy Winehouse.

Winehouse asked Zalon to tour with her for her Back to Black album which was only scheduled to last for 3 months, but the tour was so successful they ended up touring for a further three years and collected five Grammy Awards. Zalon went on to feature on the deluxe version of the platinum selling album, and I Told You I Was Trouble DVD, with the songs "Hey Little Rich Girl", "Monkey Man" and "You're Wondering Now". He also sang backing vocals on Winehouse's track "He Can Only Hold Her" which appeared on Back to Black and the BBC Radio One session, "Cupid".

Zalon performs Marvin Gaye and Tammi Terrell's hit "Ain't No Mountain High Enough" with Dionne Bromfield on her debut album.

== Television appearances ==
- 10 October 2009: Strictly Come Dancing (BBC One)
- 28 October 2009: This Morning (ITV1)

== Discography ==
=== Albums ===
- Amy Winehouse
  - 2006: Back to Black
- Zalon
  - 2017: Liquid Sonic Sex Vol 1

=== Singles ===
- Dionne Bromfield
  - 2009: "Ain't No Mountain High Enough"
