= Prost–Senna rivalry =

Formula One rivalry between Alain Prost and Ayrton Senna

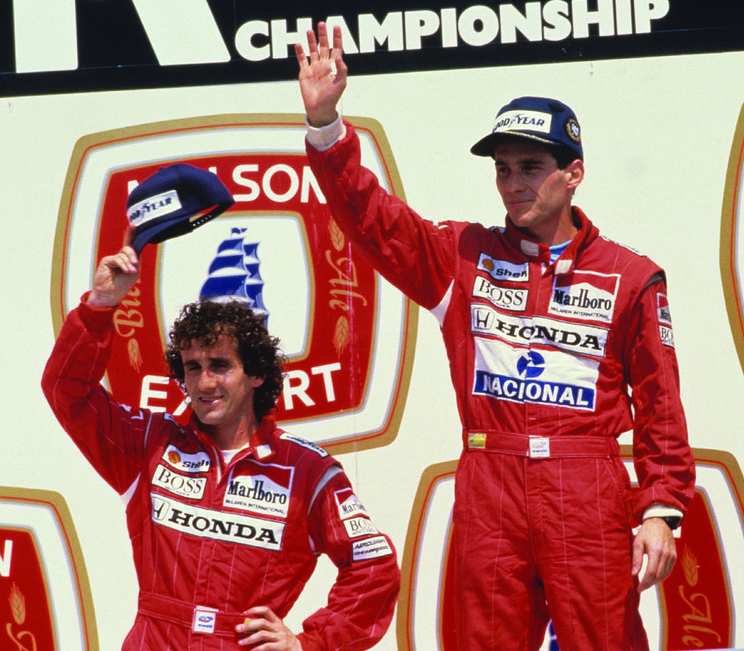
Alain Prost (left) and Ayrton Senna (right) at the Canadian Grand Prix in 1988; they won 15 of 16 Grands Prix that season with McLaren, driving the Honda-powered MP4/4.

The Prost–Senna rivalry, or Senna–Prost rivalry, was a Formula One rivalry between French racing driver Alain Prost and Brazilian racing driver Ayrton Senna. Widely regarded as one of the fiercest rivalries in Formula One history, (Note: Per several sources:) Prost and Senna together won seven of nine Formula One World Drivers' Championship titles between 1985 and 1993, including two whilst teammates at McLaren from 1988 to 1989.

The rivalry peaked during their two-year period as teammates, as well as Prost's first year at Ferrari in 1990, with the pair finishing 1–2 in each championship. Whilst teammates, Prost and Senna won 25 of 32 Grands Prix—including 11 consecutively from the start of 1988—with Senna winning the former title and Prost winning the latter. Senna led Prost 14–11 in race wins and 26–4 in pole positions; Prost held a 12–6 lead in fastest laps, 25–18 in podium finishes, and 163–150 in championship points. (Note: In the 1981 to 1990 points system, each driver's best 11 results counted towards the Drivers' Championship. With all results counted, Prost scored 186 points to Senna's 154.) Their rivalry culminated in title-deciding collisions at Suzuka in 1989 and 1990, despite Prost's move to Ferrari in the latter, with Prost winning the former championship and Senna taking the following. They again finished 1–2 in the championship standings in 1993, with Prost winning the title for Williams.

Whilst competing together in Formula One, both drivers traded accusations of dishonourable conduct and of receiving preferential treatment from external sources. Nonetheless, they held mutual respect for their driving abilities, and both admitted that they used the rivalry as motivation for success. Prost retired at the end of the 1993 season, three races before Senna's death at the 1994 San Marino Grand Prix. At the end of their respective careers, Prost held the records for most wins (51), fastest laps (41), and podium finishes (106), whilst Senna held the record for most pole positions (65); Prost won four World Drivers' Championships—three with McLaren and one with Williams—and Senna won three, all with McLaren.

== Overview ==
The Prost–Senna rivalry is widely regarded as one of the fiercest rivalries in Formula One history. Formula One has described it as the competition's "defining rivalry." Prost and Senna are two of only eleven drivers with three or more World Drivers' Championships. They drove some of the most dominant cars in Formula One history, including the McLaren MP4/4, the McLaren MP4/5, and the Williams FW15C. Their rivalry was renowned for not only their success on track, but also their contrasting driving styles and personalities. Although various rating services have attempted to compare Prost and Senna, a 2022 meta-analysis found that "approaches that are more mathematical tend to favour Prost", while "there is a clear tendency towards Senna" in critic rankings and driver/fan polls.

=== Driving styles ===
Prost fans would carefully construct their case: was it Prost who almost put his team-mate into the pitwall at Estoril in 1988? Was it Prost who manoeuvred Derek Warwick out of a drive? Was it Prost who struck a deal with a driver from another team to compromise his main rival’s race? Valid point piled upon valid point.

But all Senna fans had to do to bring this edifice tumbling down was point out that their man was the faster. And Prost fans, being Prost fans, knew this to be true. And it hurt. There was no answer to that speed, that messianic commitment.

— Paul Fearnley (Motor Sport)

Senna was arguably the fastest single-lap driver in Formula One history. He had a "tendency to go flat out all the time," and was renowned for his "high-revving, curb-clipping, crowd-pleasing school of automobile racing, pitching [his] cars around corners and braking hard on hairpins." However, he lost several wins (most notoriously, the 1988 Monaco Grand Prix) because he disliked slowing down even when he was in the lead. By contrast, Prost employed a smooth, relaxed style behind the wheel, which allowed him to get the most out of his engines without driving them to failure. His mantra was to "win as slowly as possible." On and off track, the relentless nature of Senna's driving style sharply contrasted with the calculated nature of Prost's style. Prost recalled that "Ayrton didn't want to beat me, he wanted to destroy me."

The two rivals were also distinguished by their attitudes towards risk. Senna charmed the crowd with risky overtakes and aggressive defense; McLaren's website writes that he "made it evident that he'd rather crash than give way." By contrast, Prost disliked taking risks on track, especially as he grew older; he particularly hated driving in the rain, which was one of Senna's greatest strengths. It is said that "Senna's highly aggressive, in-your-face style of driving almost rewrote the rules about racing in Formula One." Some of Senna's more controversial moves are now considered ordinary today. After the 1993 San Marino Grand Prix, Senna confronted Damon Hill about his weaving defense. Hill (who was just six months younger than Senna) irreverently responded "that I was driving the way I had learned from watching him."

Even Prost and Senna's religious faith was dragged into the rivalry. Both drivers were Catholics, but Senna was said to have been more devout. Prost once quipped that on track, "I don't rely entirely on God, I rely on Prost." He theorized that Senna was willing to risk his life on track because he believed that if he died on track, he would go to heaven. Annoyed by the jibe, Senna replied that his faith "doesn’t mean I’m immortal ... I am as scared as anyone of getting hurt."

Although Prost and Senna clashed on track, their strengths complemented each other as teammates. Because of Senna's single-lap dominance, Prost essentially conceded qualifying to Senna and focused on setting up his car for race day, a strategy he had learned from his years racing against Niki Lauda. Senna respected Prost's ability to set up a car and sometimes instructed his race engineers to copy Prost's setup on race day. Off track, Senna's ability to provide detailed technical feedback and willingness to spend long hours in the briefing room with his race engineers helped McLaren and Honda upgrade both drivers' cars.

=== Personalities ===
Senna cultivated a public image of "an inward-looking, aloof driver who is hard to get along with." With respect to his fellow drivers, this image was largely correct: unlike Prost, Senna distanced himself from most other racers, as he believed they were his competition. (A notable exception was Gerhard Berger, who developed a close rapport with Senna after Berger replaced Prost at McLaren.) After Senna joined McLaren in 1988, Prost invited him to his house for lunch, but Senna "slept [at Prost's house] for two hours" and "hardly spoke at all," an act that a Honda employee thought was intentional. However, Senna helped other drivers in times of great need. He risked his own life to help save that of Érik Comas following the latter's crash during practice for the 1992 Belgian Grand Prix. He also sought to help Martin Donnelly after Donnelly suffered career-ending injuries at the 1990 Spanish Grand Prix.

Off track, Senna displayed a greater natural charisma than Prost, especially when he was in his native Brazil. Even in his early days at Lotus, he worked hard to build a good relationship with his engineers. At McLaren, Senna remembered minor details of even junior employees' lives and sent Christmas cards to every staffer on the team. McLaren acknowledged that Senna was Honda's "favourite child" (Prost was not), but explained that it was "not just because he worked so hard for [Honda employees] but because [he] made every effort to understand them." Senna wept on camera when Honda announced its withdrawal from Formula One in late 1992. Decades later, Honda F1 director Masashi Yamamoto remarked that Honda admired Max Verstappen because, like Senna, Verstappen "pays respect to Honda" and publicly shared credit with Honda after winning the 2019 Austrian Grand Prix.

== Background ==
=== Junior racing careers ===
Senna and Prost did not compete on track during their junior careers. Prost reached Formula One by winning the French senior karting championship and the 1979 European Formula Three titles. Senna won the South American karting championship before moving to England, where he won the 1983 British Formula Three title.

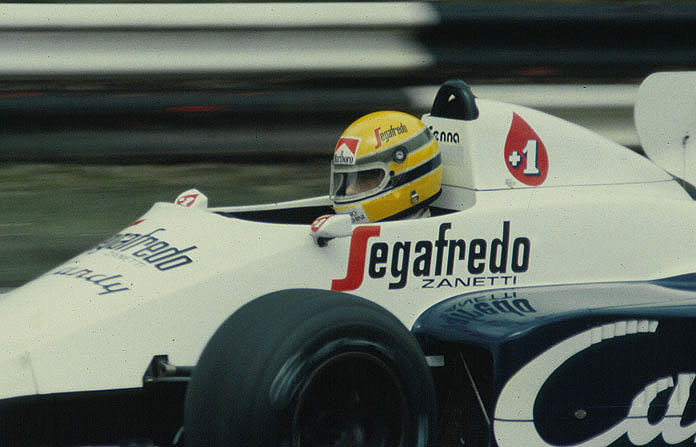
Senna piloted his Toleman to a third-place finish at the 1984 British Grand Prix. He scored the only three podiums in team history.

Prost and Senna were highly touted prospects, and both skipped directly from Formula Three to Formula One. Even as rookies, they patiently looked for slots on title-contending teams. During the 1979, Prost was offered late-season Formula One auditions at McLaren, Brabham, and Ligier, but declined them, hoping for the right opportunity to make a good first impression. He debuted with McLaren in 1980. Senna came close to debuting with a title contender in the 1984 season, but was unlucky and ended up with backmarker Toleman.

Due to competition for race seats, Senna's first clash with Prost actually came off track, as McLaren needed a second driver to partner Niki Lauda in 1984. In 1982, Senna had previously declined an offer to become a McLaren junior driver because Ron Dennis asked for a long-term commitment. Dennis granted him a test drive for the end of October 1983, but Renault unexpectedly fired Prost, the 1983 runner-up, in mid-October. Prost beat Senna to the punch and joined McLaren within a week. Senna tested for McLaren anyway, but without a drive at stake.

Senna salvaged a drive for 1984, though not without some difficulty. In November 1983, he tested with Brabham, the team of reigning Drivers' Champion (and fellow Brazilian) Nelson Piquet. Although he impressed team boss Bernie Ecclestone, Piquet and Brabham's lead sponsor Parmalat both vetoed Senna from the team. Senna also tested with Williams as a courtesy, as Frank Williams already had two drivers for 1984 but was sympathetic to Senna's situation. Already eyeing his next move, Senna joined Toleman because it set a reasonable release clause of £100,000.

Senna's first opportunity to race Formula One champions in equal machinery came at a May 1984 exhibition race, the Nürburgring Race of Champions, which Mercedes-Benz had arranged to showcase the new 190 E 2.3-16. Although some of the racers took the race more seriously than others, Prost and Senna wanted to win and qualified first and third, respectively. Senna punted Prost off track in the early laps and held off Niki Lauda for the win.

=== Engine deals ===
Prost and Senna were two of the most skilled drivers in Formula One history, but they also raced in an era where the car was very important. The sport was dominated by Honda and Renault, two wealthy engine suppliers that claimed every Constructors' Championship from 1986 to 1997. Unlike the previous dominant engine manufacturer, Ford Cosworth (which sold the Cosworth DFV to anyone who could foot the bill), Honda and Renault practised a works-team system and carefully limited the number of teams with access to their engines. This meant that for most of the Prost-Senna era, only one team was a serious title contender in any given year. Prost and Senna's careers were defined by their struggles to get into that team.

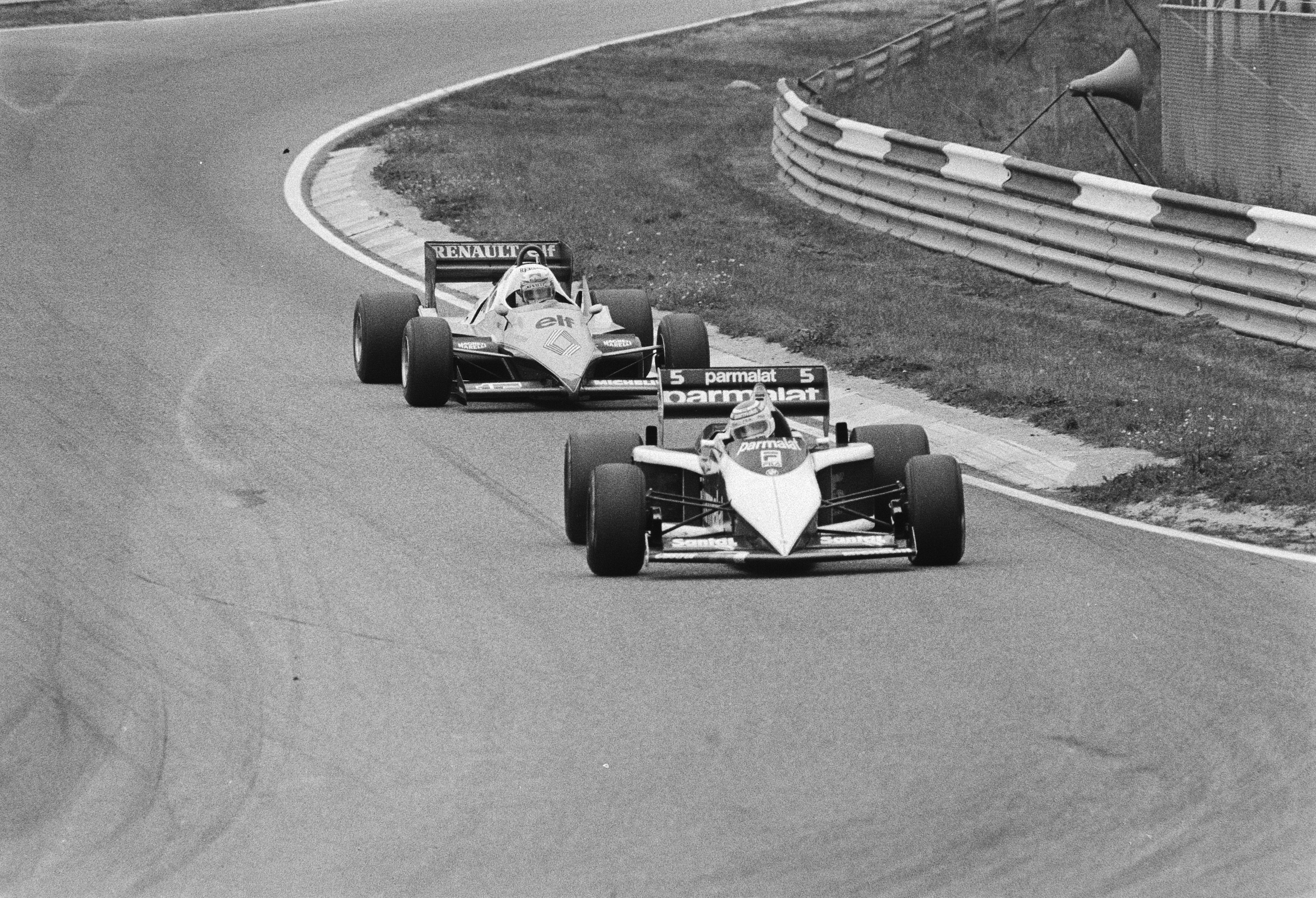
In 1983, Alain Prost (back) nearly beat Nelson Piquet (front) for his first world title. Prost led Piquet by 14 points with three races to go, but lost the title after his Renault suffered two engine failures in three races.

Once Prost and Senna proved their mettle on track, they wasted no time finding better cars. Each driver left his original team within a year. (Prost joined Renault's works team in 1981, and Senna joined Lotus-Renault in 1985.) They both dealt ruthlessly with their rookie teams. Prost left McLaren with two years remaining on his contract, "leaving [McLaren and Renault] to sort out the legal niceties." Senna violated his Toleman contract by secretly negotiating with Lotus in mid-season, prompting Toleman to suspend him for one race.

As Senna and Prost became established drivers, their strategies shifted. Senna built a lasting relationship with Lotus' new engine supplier Honda, which rewarded him by brokering his move to McLaren in 1988. By contrast, Prost jumped from team to team, and always seemed to land in a title-contending car. After three years in a fast but unreliable Renault, Prost rejoined McLaren right as the British team signed a works deal with Porsche-TAG. Prost also joined Ferrari and Williams when both teams were on the upswing.

Both drivers went on to great success. Senna won three titles with Honda power, and his superior relationship with Honda effectively maneuvered Prost out of McLaren, leaving Senna as the unquestioned number one driver of the unquestioned best team in 1990 and 1991. However, his loyalty to Honda possibly cost him the 1992 and 1993 championships, as that loyalty compelled him to decline a job offer from Williams-Renault, the greatest team of the 1990s. By contrast, Prost frequently clashed with his teams; Formula One's website notes that he "left teams acrimoniously on four occasions." However, he posted only two winless seasons in his career, and his 1993 move to Williams allowed him to finish his career with four titles to Senna's three.

=== The rise of Honda ===
Japanese auto manufacturer Honda began building Formula One engines in the 1983 season and developed into the competition's dominant force. After signing Williams as its works team in 1984, Honda won two Constructors' Championships (1986 and 1987) and one Drivers' Championship (1987). Honda continued to succeed after leaving Williams, winning six consecutive Constructors' Championships between 1986 and 1991, often by crushing margins.

The Williams-Honda relationship began deteriorating in 1986. Honda, which valued the South American car market, wanted Williams to sign a Brazilian driver. To facilitate this, it bought out Nelson Piquet's Brabham contract and paid most of his Williams salary. Because Honda preferred a clear hierarchy of drivers that would not compete too aggressively with each other on track, Frank Williams verbally promised to make Piquet the number one driver, giving Piquet the first pick of equipment and personnel. However, Frank Williams spent much of the season in a coma after a car accident. Interim team principal Patrick Head did not know of the deal and gave Nigel Mansell the same treatment as Piquet until Williams regained consciousness. Mansell fought Piquet for the title until the end of the season, which helped McLaren's Alain Prost narrowly beat Piquet to the 1986 title. Honda blamed Head for Piquet's loss. After the season, it asked Williams to replace Mansell with Honda test driver Satoru Nakajima for 1987, but Williams declined.

To obtain Honda engines, Lotus agreed to sign Nakajima to pair with its star driver, Ayrton Senna. During 1987, Honda developed a strong relationship with Senna. In 1987, Honda-powered teams swept the top three places in the Drivers' Championship. Piquet claimed his third Drivers' Championship, and Senna finished third, eleven points ahead of the fourth-placed Prost. However, Piquet's Williams contract expired at the end of the season, and Honda indicated that it would consider other options in 1988.

== Teammates at McLaren (1988–1989) ==
=== 1988 ===
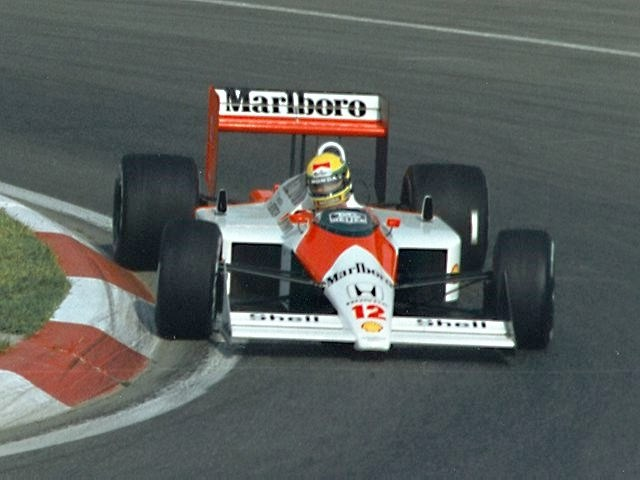
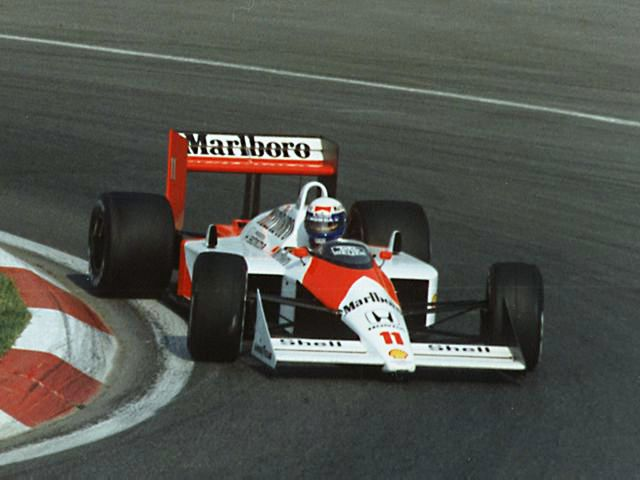
Ayrton Senna (in yellow helmet) and Alain Prost (in white helmet)

Ahead of the 1988 season, it was understood that any team that wanted Honda engines would have to sign either Piquet or Senna. Senna reached out to McLaren team boss Ron Dennis, telling him that if McLaren signed him, he would use his influence with Honda to sway Honda towards McLaren. Honda offered to re-sign with Williams if it accepted the Piquet-Nakajima pairing, but Williams declined the offer, sensing that even though Piquet was the reigning world champion, Senna – not Piquet – was already Honda's top priority.

Always on the lookout for a better engine, Prost consented to signing one of the two Brazilians. When Dennis asked him for his opinion, Prost backed Senna, preferring the youthful Senna to his experienced rival Piquet. However, he came to regret the decision. In a concession to Prost, a two-time world champion, Honda allowed McLaren to announce that Prost and Senna would compete on equal terms.

McLaren-Honda dominated 1988, winning 15 of 16 races and taking the Constructors' Championship with a then-record 199 points. Despite a gearbox failure in the season opener, Senna recorded 8 wins and 13 pole positions. Prost recorded 7 wins and 2 pole positions. Due to a scoring system that rewarded Senna's wins over Prost's consistency, Senna won the Drivers' Championship.

Senna and Prost generally raced cleanly on track in 1988. However, it eventually became clear that because of the dominance of the McLaren-Honda's car, Senna and Prost were not racing against the field, but each other. Tensions flared at the Portuguese Grand Prix, when Senna led Prost by just three points with four races left in the season. On lap 2, Prost was about to overtake Senna but Senna dangerously swerved towards Prost at around 280 km/h (174 mph) and nearly sideswiped Prost's car into the pit wall. Prost only avoided a collision by coming so close to the wall that he nearly hit March's Ian Phillips. At one point the cars were so close that Prost's front wheel was directly behind that of Senna. Nonetheless, Prost refused to yield and overtook Senna into the first corner. Although Prost won (Senna finished a distant sixth), he remained angered by Senna's manoeuvre, complaining that "If that's how [Senna] wants to win the championship, I'm not interested. I don't want any part of it." Senna later apologised to Prost. In 2019, a reporter commented that "by today's standards, [Senna's] move was quite tame, but in 1988 Senna's swerve ... [was] well beyond the accepted norm, especially when the move was against a teammate."

Over the course of the 1988 season, Prost began to suspect that Honda was trying to make Senna McLaren's number one driver, in violation of McLaren's promise to treat the two drivers equally. In November of that year, Prost met in Geneva with Nobuhiko Kawamoto, the head of Honda's R&D department and F1 racing program. He expressed his feelings that Honda was giving Senna preferential treatment. In Prost's view, Kawamoto confirmed Prost's fears, explaining that the Honda engineers liked Senna's panache and "samurai"-like driving. Kawamoto convinced Prost that he would deliver Prost equal machinery in 1989, but following the 1988 season, Honda promoted Kawamoto to a position at Honda headquarters.

=== 1989 ===
In 1989, McLaren-Honda comfortably won its second straight Constructors' Championship. Although turbochargers were banned, many of the auto manufacturers that entered Formula One during the turbo era opted to remain. Most importantly, Honda continued pouring money into its engine program. Ferrari occasionally challenged the powerful Honda V10 McLarens, but there was no real question that one of Prost or Senna would win the title: the second-placed McLaren driver finished the season 20 points clear of third.

Alain Prost won his third Drivers' Championship, with Senna in close pursuit. They traded wins throughout the season, but Prost established a comfortable lead after Senna suffered a spate of mechanical retirements at Phoenix, Montreal, Paul Ricard, Silverstone, and Monza. Going into the penultimate race at Suzuka, Prost would win the title unless Senna won the final two races of the season. Although most of the race proceeded without incident, Prost and Senna crashed with seven laps to go, handing Prost the title. The crash, and Senna's subsequent restart, win, and disqualification, were immensely controversial. As Prost later acknowledged, it was widely believed that Prost intentionally turned into Senna's path, hoping for a crash.

==== Prost's deteriorating relationship with Honda ====
Prost continued to suspect unequal treatment from Honda. His suspicions were inflamed when Honda sent McLaren an engine crate marked "Special - For Ayrton." He noted that although he scored only four pole positions during 1988 and 1989, two of these pole positions were at the French Grand Prix, implying that Honda was merely allowing him to win these races to please his hometown crowd. Former Williams-Honda drivers Nigel Mansell (who suspected that Honda had given Piquet better engines than him as part of Piquet's number one driver status) and Keke Rosberg publicly agreed that Prost was not getting equal treatment.

After the Mexican Grand Prix, Prost publicly called out McLaren and Honda, as his car was noticeably less powerful on the straights than Senna's even though Prost had set up his car for more top speed than Senna. (On two occasions, Senna out-powered Prost on the straights when Prost had a tow and when Prost was on fresh tyres.) Mansell backed up Prost at Monza, reminding the press that Senna was 5 km/h faster than Prost on the straights in qualifying, albeit with a better qualifying set-up. After Prost threatened to join a rival team at the end of the season, Ron Dennis publicly backed Prost against Honda, "declar[ing] that the team had found consistent differences" between the engines that Honda assigned to Senna and Prost. To accommodate Prost's concerns, Dennis randomly allocated engines between the two drivers.

Prost and Dennis' public criticisms forced Honda's Osamu Goto to give an interview before the race at Hockenheim, where he claimed that Senna's driving style was better suited to Honda's machinery. According to Goto, Senna's foot-tapping style with the accelerator helped keep the RA109-E's revs up in the engine's mid-range where most of the power was, while Prost's smoother style dropped the engines into low revs where they had a pick-up problem. However, Motor Sport magazine noted that while Goto called Prost by his last name, he called Senna by his first name. (Per Japanese customs, addressing a person by their first name rather than the surname shows a much higher degree of familiarity and confidentiality.)

Ahead of the Canadian Grand Prix, Goto temporarily mollified Prost by giving him the same computer chips Senna was getting; previously, the two drivers had been using different technology. Prost retired from that race with a suspension failure but picked up his first pole position of the year. However, Prost publicly rejected Goto's assurances after Senna trounced Prost in qualifying at the Italian Grand Prix. Insulted, Honda threatened to withdraw its engines from Prost's car unless Prost apologized, which he did.

==== Tensions within the team ====
Senna accused Prost, a Frenchman, of getting favourable treatment from his countryman Jean-Marie Balestre, the president of the FISA. Prost had previously persuaded Balestre to write to Honda insisting that Prost receive equal treatment. Balestre publicly speculated that Senna's Honda engines had a 20-horsepower advantage over Prost's.

Prost also accused Senna of reneging on an agreement they had made in advance of the San Marino Grand Prix. The drivers agreed that whoever won the start would not be challenged by the other going into the first turn. Prost kept to the agreement after Senna won the first start, but the race was red-flagged after Gerhard Berger's Ferrari crashed. Prost won the restart, but Senna promptly passed him, believing that the agreement did not apply to the restart. Prost disclosed the agreement to a French journalist, who publicly humiliated Senna by publishing the story (purportedly against Prost's wishes). Senna publicly denied that any such agreement existed, but eyewitness John Hogan backed up Prost. Although Ron Dennis forced Senna to apologise to Prost, Senna was furious at Prost for taking their dispute public.

Ahead of the 1989 Italian Grand Prix, Prost announced that he would leave McLaren and join Ferrari in 1990. Prost would go on to win the Italian GP after Senna's engine blew up while in the lead. After receiving his winner's trophy, Prost dropped the trophy into the cheering crowds of Ferrari tifosi, to Ron Dennis' fury. (The policy at McLaren is that driver trophies must be handed over to the team in exchange for replicas.) Although Senna opportunistically encouraged McLaren to fire Prost immediately, McLaren allowed Prost to finish the season with the team in exchange for a public, written apology. Prost was 20 points ahead of Senna in the Drivers' Championship standings at the time, and McLaren's concession eliminated the possibility that Prost would clinch the 1989 title in a Ferrari car.

==== Decisive clash at Suzuka ====
Despite Honda's suspected support for Senna, Prost enjoyed one of the most consistently dominant seasons of his career and looked set to cruise to the title. He went into the Japanese Grand Prix (the second-to-last race of the season) with a comfortable 16-point lead over Senna. Senna needed to win the next two races to claim the title, while a Senna crash would automatically clinch the title for Prost.

The 1989 Japanese Grand Prix remains one of the most infamous races in Formula One history. Senna took pole position, with Prost in second. Prost jumped Senna at the start and was leading into turn one. On lap 46, Prost was in the lead and was just seven laps away from clinching the title in the normal fashion. Desperate to pass Prost to keep his championship hopes alive, Senna attempted a daring inside overtake at the slow-speed Casio chicane. Prost squeezed Senna on the inside and did not leave room for Senna to make the overtake. Senna was either unable or unwilling to brake in time to avoid a collision. Both cars rolled onto the escape road. Although Prost protested that he simply played on Senna's tendency to risk crashes while overtaking, many felt that Prost was more interested in causing a crash than defending his lead. His turning angle was abnormally aggressive and he missed the natural racing line. Keke Rosberg quipped that "You could tell Alain had never done anything like that before ... because he did it so badly!"

Prost got out of the car and walked away, thinking he had won the title. However, Senna refused to give up. He waved over the marshals to give him a bump-start – within the rules if a car is deemed to be parked in a dangerous position, although Motor Sport opined that once the car was in the escape road, that rule no longer applied. Senna re-entered the race, pitted for a new front wing, and won the race. Had the result stood, the championship would be decided at the season finale at Adelaide. Senna would clinch the title with a win, while Prost would clinch the title as long as Senna did not win. (Note: Under Formula One's byzantine scoring system, Senna would clinch the title with a victory at Adelaide, regardless of how well Prost did.: Senna could only pass Prost with a win. Had Senna's win at Suzuka stood, he would have trailed Prost 76-69 with one race to go. A win, worth nine points, would have put Senna ahead 78-76. A second-place finish, worth six points, would leave Senna behind 76-75.; Prost could only increase his score by finishing first or second. Only Prost's best eleven results counted towards the Drivers' Championship. Prost's eleventh-best result was a third-place finish at Jerez, worth four points. This rule did not apply to Senna, who was in no danger of reaching eleven scoring results.; If Senna won and Prost finished second, Senna would win the title. The two racers would be tied 78-78, and Senna held the tiebreaker of total wins.)

Because of the unusual circumstances, the race stewards did not allow Senna to celebrate on the podium. Following the race, Senna was formally disqualified for illegally re-entering the track and cutting the chicane, ending his title chase. The stewards did not rule on the legality of the bump-start. Senna appealed to FISA, the sport's top regulator, noting that drivers had missed chicanes on several occasions that season without penalty. However, FISA's Balestre dismissed his case, fined him US$100,000 for "dangerous driving", and imposed a suspended six-month ban.

Senna indignantly threatened to retire, but Ron Dennis persuaded him to continue, saying "If you stop, they've won." Balestre threatened to ban him from competing in 1990 unless Senna apologised for his critical remarks. To forestall further action, Honda and McLaren pressured Senna into signing a conciliatory statement. At the end of the 1990 season, Senna received some vindication when Nelson Piquet criticised the 1989 ruling at the Japanese Grand Prix pre-race drivers' briefing. Piquet told the room that it was dangerous for a driver, having gone off track, to turn around—potentially into oncoming traffic—to return to the original track position. After many drivers voiced their support, Senna got up and left in protest. Senna promptly disavowed the conciliatory statement after Balestre lost control of FISA in late 1991.

== Later careers (1990–1993) ==
=== 1990: Second clash at Suzuka ===
In 1990, the Ferrari 641, piloted by Prost and Nigel Mansell, was the first car to seriously threaten McLaren-Honda's stranglehold on the Constructors' Championship. Ferrari came within 11 points of the Constructors' Championship, and Prost finished second in the Drivers' Championship.

In an intense back-and-forth battle, Senna won three of the first five races, but Prost responded with three wins at a row at Mexico City, Paul Ricard, and Silverstone. Senna eventually pulled ahead, but at Jerez, a quick pit stop allowed Prost to pass Senna, who eventually retired with a mechanical failure. Ironically, Prost's win put him in the same position as Senna in 1989, where Prost needed to win the remaining two races to take the title, while Senna just needed Prost to crash out of a single race. Once again, the title was decided at Suzuka, but this time, Senna drove into Prost at the first turn of the first lap, ending both drivers’ races. At the post-race press conference, Prost insisted that Senna had intentionally taken him out. He concluded that Senna "tries to represent himself to the world as a man he is not. He has no value."

[I]f you get [expletive] every single time you're trying to do your job cleanly and properly, by the system, by other people taking advantage of it, what should you do? ... You should fight for what you think is right ... I was [expletive] from the year before, I was [expletive] in the winter, I was [expletive] in the qualifying ... it was again a result of a decision, a bad decision, influenced by Balestre. ... It was not my responsibility. I did contribute to it, yes. But it was not my responsibility.

— Senna explaining why he wrecked Prost in 1991

Senna was not penalized for the incident. The evidence generally supported Prost, as Honda telemetry showed that Senna kept his foot on the throttle all the way through turn one, and Ron Dennis (who reviewed the condition of Senna's brake and throttle after the race) privately concluded the same. However, video evidence was not conclusive, and opinions about Senna's guilt were initially "divided into two roughly equal camps." Senna spent the next year defending his innocence and taunting "all the people who fought against me last year." He famously lectured three-time Drivers' Champion Jackie Stewart that a true racer would never let Prost through the first corner, rationalizing that "if you no longer go for a gap that exists you are no longer a racing driver."

Senna admitted that he intentionally wrecked Prost after Max Mosley replaced Jean-Marie Balestre as the head of FISA in October 1991. A longtime critic of Balestre, Mosley thought Balestre had "fixed" Senna's 1989 appeal in Prost's favour. (Balestre had previously cost Prost the 1983 title by declining to disqualify Nelson Piquet's Brabham, whose fuel octane rating technically exceeded the regulatory limit.) Senna was delighted by the change, praising Mosley's "no bullshit" attitude and telling the media that Mosley "was sensible, intelligent, and ... fair." Although he conceded that crashing Prost out of the race was "a [expletive]" way to end the season, he stood by his actions for three reasons: (1) he wanted to get even with Prost for the Frenchman's "unforgiveable" conduct in 1989; (2) he believed that Balestre had exhibited favouritism towards his countryman Prost for years; and (3) before the 1990 race, Balestre had rejected Senna's request, as the polesitter, to start on the clean side of the track, even though the year before, Prost had used the clean side of the track to overtake Senna into turn one.

In Mosley's view, Senna's premeditated crash ordinarily would have merited disqualification from the 1990 title race. However, he sympathized with Senna because of the events of 1989, which he considered "absolutely outrageous." After Senna agreed to issue a statement that "at no time did I deliberately collide with Alain," Mosley declined to punish him. Prost declined to comment at the time, although he later responded that Senna had not complained about the dirty side of the track in 1989.

=== 1991–1992: Alleviation of tensions ===
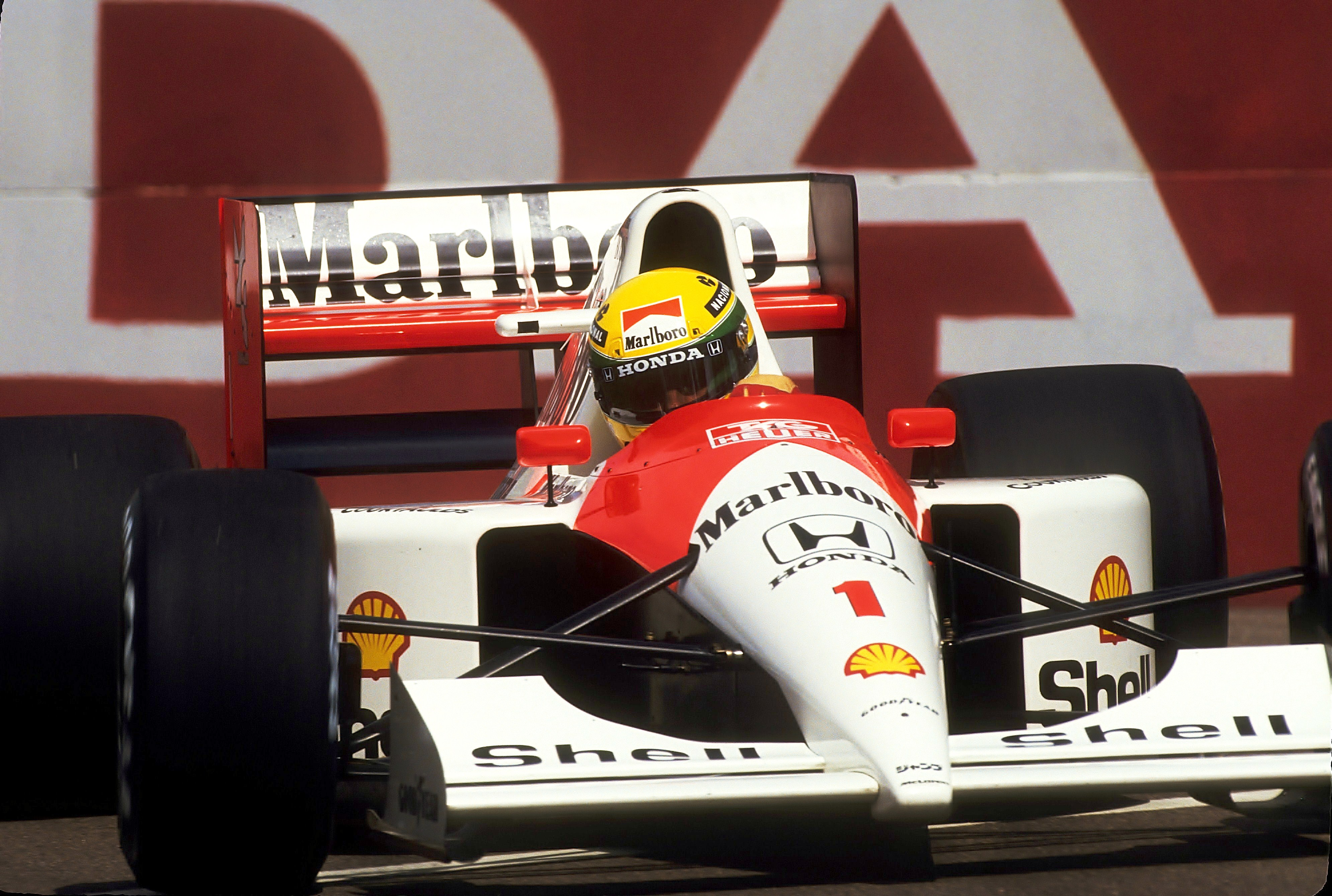
Ayrton Senna driving during the 1991 United States Grand Prix

Unbeknownst to Prost and Senna, 1990 was the last year that their rivalry would be primarily fueled by on-track conflict. After 1990, the two drivers would never seriously compete for the title at the same time.

Senna and Gerhard Berger led McLaren-Honda to another dominant season in 1991. Senna won his third and final Drivers' Championship, McLaren won its fourth consecutive Constructors' Championship, and Honda won its sixth consecutive Constructors' Championship. Although Williams' Nigel Mansell mounted a creditable challenge, Senna effectively clinched the title before the halfway mark of the season, and finished with 96 points to Mansell's 72.

Prost fell out of the title picture, as the Ferrari 642 was not a competitive car, and a mid-season switch to the Ferrari 643 produced short-term improvements but no lasting results. Prost posted his first winless season since his rookie year. Frustrated, he began publicly criticizing the team again. Ferrari fired him after he compared the Ferrari car to a "truck"; reportedly, his specific complaint was that "the steering locks up completely in big curves," and "a good truck driver with [a] big arm could have done just as well." Ferrari paid Prost a large severance package to sit out the 1992 season.

The one flash point in 1991 came at Hockenheim, when Senna ran Prost off the track and onto the escape road. After the race, Prost furiously said that "If I find him doing the same thing again I will push him off, that's for sure." Senna retorted that "I think everybody knows Prost by now. He is always complaining about the car or the team or the circuit or the other drivers. It's never his fault." Following the race, the FISA ordered Senna and Prost to sit down together to cool tensions and prevent further incidents.

Before the start of the 1992 season, Senna turned down a job offer from Williams out of loyalty to Honda. However, his timing was poor, as that year, Williams-Renault became the dominant force in the sport. Renault engines won six consecutive Constructors' Championships from 1992 to 1997, matching Honda's win streak. Despite winning three races, Senna could only manage fourth place in the 1992 standings, and champion Nigel Mansell more than doubled his points tally. Honda left Formula One at the end of the year, removing Senna's greatest backer from the picture.

=== 1993: Prost returns ===
==== Williams driver controversy ====
The 1993 season saw Prost return to the grid and win his fourth world championship with Williams-Renault. Prost lauded the Williams FW15C car, calling it "absolutely unbelievable." He estimated that it was "a good second [per lap], minimum" faster than the rest of the grid. Senna finished a relatively distant (by his standards) second place, driving a customer Ford-Cosworth engine with 60 fewer horsepower than Prost's Renault. Armed with the best car on the grid, Prost outqualified Senna like Senna once outqualified Prost; the Frenchman crushed Senna 15-1 in qualifying, scoring 13 pole positions in 16 races. McLaren tried to replace Honda with Renault engines, and even considered buying the entire Ligier team (the only other team with Renault power) to acquire its engine contract. However, all these efforts failed, leaving Williams alone at the top of the grid.

Due to the lopsided dominance of the Williams-Renault combination, most of the drama happened before the season. Going into 1993, Williams had two open seats and no shortage of suitors, although it was expected that Mansell would return to defend his title. Prost wasted no time and began negotiating for a Williams seat near the start of the 1992 season. He was helped by Williams' French engine supplier Renault and fuel supplier Elf, who both wanted a French driver. Frank Williams signed Prost to a two-year contract, replacing Riccardo Patrese, who, expecting to be replaced by Prost or Senna, had preemptively left for Benetton. Although Mansell and Prost had bad blood from their unhappy year as Ferrari teammates in 1990, Mansell agreed to share a garage with Prost as long as the two World Champions received equal status and Mansell received a larger salary.

Prost expected to race with Mansell in 1993, but following a convoluted series of events, Williams ended up pairing him with a rookie, Damon Hill. After Prost signed with Williams and Honda left Formula One, Senna desperately told Frank Williams that he would drive for free. Williams used Senna's offer to play hardball with Mansell during their contract negotiations, prompting Mansell to leave Formula One for Newman-Haas Racing in CART. Mansell later claimed that "Prost didn't want me in the team" and that Renault and Elf had pressured Frank Williams to freeze him out. However, he also said that Williams eventually capitulated to all his contract demands, and that he left not because of the money but because he no longer trusted the organisation. As insurance in case the Mansell deal fell through, Prost had negotiated a clause in his contract which prevented Senna from joining the team (which Mansell was apparently not aware of). Williams belatedly offered to re-sign Patrese, but he opted to honor his contract with Benetton.

After learning that Prost had blocked him from Williams, an infuriated Senna publicly said that Prost was "behaving like a coward" and that "if he wants to be sportive, he must be prepared to race anybody, at any condition, at equal terms." Although Prost was unmoved by the insult, Senna continued needling him during the 1993 season. At a rainy Donington Park, Senna took the win after overtaking four drivers on the first lap. Prost finished third after pitting seven times, the most in Formula One history. During the post-race press conference, Prost listed various problems he encountered while driving the Williams car. Senna cheekily offered to swap cars with him.

==== Senna's turn to play politics ====
In 1993, Williams' Patrick Head concluded that – in an ironic inversion of the Senna-Balestre relationship – the new FISA head, Max Mosley, had a grudge against Prost. The Independent suggested that Mosley targeted Prost to "enliven" the 1993 season, as Prost had a dominant role in Formula One's only dominant team heading into 1993.

- Before the season started, Mosley wrote Frank Williams a scathing letter urging him to fire Prost and blacklist him from the sport for publicly criticising FISA. Williams refused to give in, and Mosley contented himself by threatening to suspend Prost for four races (he did not).
- At Monaco (a track where pole position is extremely important), Prost qualified on pole but received a ten-second stop-go penalty for jumping the start by one-tenth of a second, allowing Senna to claim the victory.
- Mosley accused Williams of using illegal fuel and threatened to disqualify Prost from several races; however, no penalty was given.
- Mosley also sought to ban the electronic driver aids, such as active suspension, that (in addition to the Renault engine) allowed Williams to dominate the 1992 and 1993 seasons. However, Mosley was unable to ban the driver aids in mid-season.

By contrast, Mosley was relatively lenient towards Senna, a trend going back to 1991, when Mosley declined to penalize Senna for intentionally wrecking Prost at Suzuka in 1990. When a frustrated Senna punched Eddie Irvine in the head at the 1993 Suzuka race, the stewards threatened to ban Senna for two races, but Mosley's FISA commuted the punishment to probation, citing Irvine's provocations on track and Senna's "very positive attitude." After six races, Senna unexpectedly led Prost in the standings. However, Prost won the next four races and comfortably won the championship.

In addition, Senna won over Renault Sport president Patrick Faure, who eventually asked Prost to let Senna join the team. Auto manufacturers coveted Senna's immense marketing potential in Brazil; in 1993, Senna signed a lucrative agreement with Audi for this purpose. Although Renault was a French company, it was hoping to enter the Brazilian market. As of December 2023, Brazil is Renault's second-largest market (after France), and Renault do Brasil's Curitiba factory is named after Senna.

==== Prost retires ====
Prost was stung by the criticism, which he summarized as "when you win ... it's normal, when you lose, you're stupid." However, he could not bring himself to team up with Senna again. Even so, he agreed that it would look bad if he blocked Senna from contending for the title for a second straight season, and he did not want a repeat of the McLaren-Honda years where his engine manufacturer was (allegedly) unhappy with him:

I did not want to be a teammate with Ayrton again. [But] I did not want to continue with this perception of the people saying, "OK, you know, Ayrton is a poor guy with a small car, and Alain, when he wins it's normal because he has the best car." I said, "OK, you want Ayrton. I understand very well. You pay me the contract for the next year, and I stop." I did not want to stop. I really did not want to stop. But to see a situation ... especially in your own country [Renault was a French state-owned enterprise until 1996], going in this direction again?

As such, Prost retired and Senna replaced him at Williams. Renault gave Prost a job as a special ambassador. At the time, it was widely believed that Renault would eventually supply engines for a future Prost-owned Formula One team.

== Legacy ==
=== Aftermath ===
Professionally, he was the only driver I respected. In Senna's honour I will never sit in a Formula One car again.

— Prost speaking after Senna's death in 1994

Following Prost's retirement and Senna's accession to Williams-Renault, many expected Senna to dominate the sport in the following years. (After Prost's retirement, Williams continued to excel, winning the 1994, 1996, and 1997 Constructors' Championships.) However, Senna was killed during the 1994 San Marino Grand Prix when his Williams collided at high speed with a barrier at the Tamburello corner. Commentators continue to speculate on what Senna could have achieved in the dominant 1990s Williams cars, had he lived.

Once they were no longer competitors, the two rivals began mending their relationship. At Prost's last Grand Prix, the 1993 Australian Grand Prix, Senna pulled him onto the top step of the podium for an embrace. After Prost's retirement, the two drivers spoke once or twice a week, mostly about F1-related issues such as driver safety and the dubious legality of Benetton's 1994 car. On the last day of Senna's life, Senna ate his last breakfast with Prost — now a television pundit for TF1 — and then filmed an in-car lap of Imola for Prost's channel. He told the cameras, "A special hello to my...to our dear friend, Alain. We all miss you Alain." Prost said that he was surprised and touched by the comment. Although Prost said that he and Senna were not particularly close at the time of Senna's death, looking back, he believed that "in time we might have become friends."

Prost commented that when Senna died "a part of himself had died also", because their careers had been so closely bound together. Senna felt similarly, admitting to a close friend that after Prost retired, he realised how much of his motivation had come from fighting with Prost. Although Prost was the obvious candidate to replace Senna at Williams, he said that out of respect to Senna, he would not race in Formula One again. According to Prost, he was the one driver invited by the Senna family to visit their home after Senna's death.

Following Senna's death, Prost was a pallbearer at Senna's funeral. Prost was unsure whether the Brazilian public would accept his attendance at the funeral, given the intensity of their rivalry, but Jean-Luc Lagardère (whose wife was Brazilian) said that the Brazilians would respect it. (By contrast, Nelson Piquet did not attend the funeral at all, and the Senna family explicitly banned Bernie Ecclestone from participating in the ceremonies.) However, out of consideration for said rivalry, Senna's press officer ensured that Prost and Jackie Stewart (who had angered Senna by criticizing him after the 1990 Japanese Grand Prix) would not stand in the front row during the funeral procession.

Prost did not stay at Renault for very long. According to Joe Saward, Prost had long dreamed of running his own Formula One team. However, Renault was in the middle of a long privatisation process; the French State gave up majority control of Renault in 1996. The company shut down its expensive Formula One engine project in 1997, allegedly to please shareholders. Stymied in his quest for a customer engine contract, Prost left Renault in 1995. Prost did not get his own Formula One team until 1997, when he purchased Ligier (Renault's former customer team) and renamed it to Prost Grand Prix. Ironically, during his first year as a team principal, he used Mugen-Honda engines.

=== 2010 Senna documentary ===
Asif Kapadia's award-winning documentary Senna (2010) sparked a fresh round of interest in the Prost–Senna rivalry. Although the film was praised for its portrayal of Senna's psyche, the film omitted key moments in the collapse of Senna and Prost's relationship at McLaren, such as Senna's dangerous attempt to block Prost at Estoril in 1988 and Prost's public accusations that Senna had acted dishonourably at Imola in 1989. Writer Manish Pandey explained that the creative team left out these incidents (as well as Senna's famous victory at Donington Park) because the camera footage was not dramatic enough. Pandey conceded that "it's such a big rivalry and I think we made a mistake by not finding one tiny bit of touchpaper to light."

The film's portrayal of Prost was also controversial, as Kapadia said that the film needed to emphasize Senna's outsider status as a Brazilian driver in a primarily European sport. Kapadia explained that Senna was "coming into the European world, taking on the dominant drivers and administration that seemed to favour Alain Prost." In a lengthy defense of Prost's driving skills, Autosport's Graham Keilloh wrote on his personal blog that "the film had to have a coherent Hollywood-style narrative, complete with a protagonist and antagonist," and summarized that "Prost is very much presented as the [film's] villain, ... us[ing] 'politics' to prevail in the sport." Stefan Johansson, who teamed up with both drivers during his career, added that "at best, it was six of one and half a dozen of the other. ... [The film] was not a true reflection of the guy I knew[.]"

On the other hand, RaceFans' Keith Collantine argued that "it is not Prost but FISA President Jean-Marie Balestre who is ultimately portrayed as the villain" in the film. The New York Times' Stephen Holden agreed that Balestre was the film's real villain. Kapadia acknowledged that the filmmakers saw Balestre as a "comedy bad guy."

For his own part, Prost complained that although he spent "many, many hours" interviewing with the filmmakers, the film skipped over Prost and Senna's efforts to mend their relationship following Prost's retirement, such as Senna's greeting "We all miss you, Alain" at Imola. Pandey defended the film's treatment of this issue, explaining that the audio quality of the "We all miss you, Alain" video clip was not good enough for a feature film, and noting that the film did include other instances of reconciliation, such as Senna welcoming Prost onto the podium to celebrate his last race.

=== 2024 television programmes ===
In November 2024, Netflix released a six-episode miniseries on Senna's career, starring Gabriel Leone as Senna and Matt Mella as Prost. The Senna family collaborated with the project. Leone's portrayal of Senna received praise; The Daily Telegraph noted that "not only is he a dead ringer for Senna, but he has also plainly done his research, with mannerisms and cadences all present and correct." However, the miniseries' treatment of the Prost–Senna rivalry was questioned by several media outlets. RaceFans said that while "it's hard to argue with [Jean-Marie] Balestre being cast as the villain of the piece ... the depiction of Prost, a four-times world champion, as a driver of marginal ability who relied on superior cars to win, is harsh and simplistic." Motor Sport said that "Yet again [Prost's] simply cast as the villain to the Brazilian’s hero. It’s all bad on one side, all good on the other apparently." The Times commented that "a good amount of time is devoted to [Senna's] testy relationship with Prost but it all feels rather surface." However, the Associated Press praised the miniseries' coverage of the rivalry, noting that it covered Prost and Senna's friendship at the end of Prost's career.

In December 2024, Canal+ released a six-episode documentary series on Prost's career. The network teased that Prost "did not take kindly" to his portrayal in the 2010 Senna documentary. Senna was discussed in three out of the six episodes. During the docuseries, Prost expressed concern that since his retirement, his career and life had been "reduced" to the Prost–Senna rivalry.

== Results comparison ==
=== Overall summary ===
| Driver | World Drivers' Championship (Note: Only seasons where both drivers were active. Prost was also active from 1980 to 1983, and Senna was also active in 1992 and 1994.) | | | | | | | | | WDCs | Wins | Poles | F/Laps | Podiums | Points |
| Driver | 1984 | 1985 | 1986 | 1987 | 1988 | 1989 | 1990 | 1991 | 1993 | WDCs | Wins | Poles | F/Laps | Podiums | Points |
|---|---|---|---|---|---|---|---|---|---|---|---|---|---|---|---|
| (France) Alain Prost | 2nd McLaren | 1st McLaren | 1st McLaren | 4th McLaren | 2nd McLaren | 1st McLaren | 2nd Ferrari | 5th Ferrari | 1st Williams | 4 | 42 | 23 | 33 | 89 | 629.5 (659.5) (Note: In the 1981 to 1990 points system, each driver's best 11 results counted towards the Drivers' Championship. With all results counted, Prost scored 659.5 points to Senna's 564.) |
| (Brazil) Ayrton Senna | 9th Toleman | 4th Lotus | 4th Lotus | 3rd Lotus | 1st McLaren | 2nd McLaren | 1st McLaren | 1st McLaren | 2nd McLaren | 3 | 41 | 61 | 18 | 80 | 560 (564) |

=== As teammates ===
==== Summary ====
| Driver | Entries | WDCs | Wins | Poles | F/Laps | Podiums | Points |
|---|---|---|---|---|---|---|---|
| (Brazil) Ayrton Senna | 32 | 1 | 14 | 26 | 6 | 18 | 150 (154) |
| (France) Alain Prost | 32 | 1 | 11 | 4 | 12 | 25 | 163 (186) |

==== Complete results ====
===== 1988 season =====
| Pos. | Driver | BRA (Brazil) | SMR (Italy) | MON (Monaco) | MEX (Mexico) | CAN (Canada) | DET (United States) | FRA (France) | GBR (United Kingdom) | GER (West Germany) | HUN (Hungary) | BEL (Belgium) | ITA (Italy) | POR (Portugal) | ESP (Spain) | JPN (Japan) | AUS (Australia) | Points |
|---|---|---|---|---|---|---|---|---|---|---|---|---|---|---|---|---|---|---|
| 1 | (Brazil) Ayrton Senna | DSQ^{P} | 1^{P} | Ret^{P}^{F} | 2^{P} | 1^{P}^{F} | 1^{P} | 2 | 1 | 1^{P} | 1^{P} | 1^{P} | 10^{P} | (6) | (4)^{P} | 1^{P}^{F} | 2^{P} | 90 (94) (Note: In the 1981 to 1990 points system, each driver's best 11 results counted towards the Drivers' Championship. With all results counted, Prost scored 105 points to Senna's 94.) |
| 2 | (France) Alain Prost | 1 | 2^{F} | 1 | 1^{F} | 2 | 2^{F} | 1^{P}^{F} | Ret | 2 | (2)^{F} | (2) | Ret | 1^{P} | 1^{F} | (2) | 1^{F} | 87 (105) |

===== 1989 season =====
| Pos. | Driver | BRA (Brazil) | SMR (Italy) | MON (Monaco) | MEX (Mexico) | USA (United States) | CAN (Canada) | FRA (France) | GBR (United Kingdom) | GER (West Germany) | HUN (Hungary) | BEL (Belgium) | ITA (Italy) | POR (Portugal) | ESP (Spain) | JPN (Japan) | AUS (Australia) | Points |
|---|---|---|---|---|---|---|---|---|---|---|---|---|---|---|---|---|---|---|
| 1 | (France) Alain Prost | 2 | 2^{F} | 2^{F} | (5) | 1 | Ret^{P} | 1^{P} | 1 | 2 | (4) | 2^{F} | 1^{F} | 2 | 3 | Ret^{F} | Ret | 76 (81) (Note: In the 1981 to 1990 points system, each driver's best 11 results counted towards the Drivers' Championship. With all results counted, Prost scored 81 points to Senna's 60.) |
| 2 | (Brazil) Ayrton Senna | 12^{P} | 1^{P} | 1^{P} | 1^{P} | Ret^{P}^{F} | 7 | Ret | Ret^{P} | 1^{P}^{F} | 2 | 1^{P} | Ret^{P} | Ret^{P} | 1^{P}^{F} | DSQ^{P} | Ret^{P} | 60 |

Key
| Colour | Result |
|---|---|
| Gold | Winner |
| Silver | Second place |
| Bronze | Third place |
| Green | Other points position |
| Blue | Other classified position |
| Blue | Not classified, finished (NC) |
| Purple | Not classified, retired (Ret) |
| Red | Did not qualify (DNQ) |
| Red | Did not pre-qualify (DNPQ) |
| Black | Disqualified (DSQ) |
| White | Did not start (DNS) |
| White | Race cancelled (C) |
| Blank | Did not practice (DNP) |
| Blank | Excluded (EX) |
| Blank | Did not arrive (DNA) |
| Blank | Withdrawn (WD) |
| Blank | Did not enter (empty cell) |
| Annotation | Meaning |
| P | Pole position |
| F | Fastest lap |
| † | Did not finish, but classified for completing over 90% of the race distance |

== See also ==
- List of sports rivalries
- Formula One rivalries
- Senna (film)
