= Nine Days (soundtrack) =

Nine Days (Original Motion Picture Soundtrack)

Film score by Antônio Pinto
- Released: July 9, 2021
- Recorded: 2019–2021
- Genre: Film score
- Length: 39:43
- Label: Warner Classics
- Producer: Antônio Pinto

Antônio Pinto chronology
Awake (2021)	Nine Days (2021)	Joe Bell (2021)

Nine Days (Original Motion Picture Soundtrack) is the film score to the 2021 film Nine Days directed by Edson Oda. The film score is composed by Antônio Pinto and was released through Warner Classics on July 9, 2021, three weeks prior to the film's release in the United States.

== Development ==
In December 2019, it was announced that Antônio Pinto would compose the musical score for Nine Days. Oda stated that he had liked his work, ever since his childhood, having watched films like Central Station (1998), City of God (2002) and the documentary Senna (2010) and both of them were from Brazil; he described that working with and learning from him "was an amazing experience" but also commended Pinto's efforts for the film.

Much of the film's music was written even before the production. As Pinto had to write the violin score for Amanda's character, he wrote a six-minute piece during the pre-production. Pinto had also composed the Portuguese song which appears during the bicycle scene, but was credited to Yaniel Matos, one of his assistants. The song was performed by Portuguese singer Manuela Julian.

== Release ==
Warner Classics released the 19-track album on July 9, 2021, three weeks prior to the film's limited release in the US.

== Track listing ==
All music is composed by Antônio Pinto, David Bessler, Gabriel Ferreira and Yaniel Matos.

No.	Title	Length
1.	"10327 Days of Life"	1:20
2.	"Emma"	2:40
3.	"Will"	1:17
4.	"A Moment You Like"	1:08
5.	"Amanda's Solo"	1:37
6.	"The Lull Before The Storm"	1:24
7.	"Concerto Day"	1:00
8.	"Nine Pianos"	2:12
9.	"Eu Na Rua"	2:09
10.	"Night Falls"	0:48
11.	"Night Walk"	1:20
12.	"Maria's Letter"	1:15
13.	"Denial"	0:45
14.	"Will and Katsuji"	2:26
15.	"Will and Emma"	2:38
16.	"The Ninth Day"	2:46
17.	"Rebirth"	4:21
18.	"Eu Na Rua (Full version)"	3:29
19.	"Father and Daughter"	3:45
Total length:		39:43

== Reception ==
Sheila O'Malley of RogerEbert.com wrote "There is a score by Antonio Pinto but it drops out for long stretches. When music shows up, it has great resonance and power." Elizabeth Weitzman of TheWrap wrote "Antonio Pinto matches the tone with a strings-heavy score that underlines every emotional beat." Peter Debruge of Variety noted that Pinto's contribution helped Oda "to create an alternate reality that glows and reverberates even more than the one we inhabit." Kimberley Jones of The Austin Chronicle said, "Antonio Pinto's strings-forward score nudged my brain to stop churning long enough for pure emotion to kick in". Los Angeles Times wrote "The astonishing string-forward score by Antonio Pinto hypnotizes us into a state of melancholic weightlessness." Patrick Gibbs of SLUG wrote "The score by Antônio Pinto is gorgeous".

== Accolades ==
Award	Date of ceremony	Category	Recipient(s)	Result	Ref.
Hollywood Music in Media Awards	November 17, 2021	Best Original Score in an Independent Film	Antônio Pinto	Nominated	
