= Antônio Pinto (composer) =

Brazilian film score composer (born 1967)

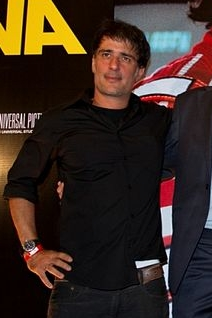
- Pinto at the Senna film premiere in 2010
- Born: 1967 (age 57–58)
- Occupation: Film score composer
- Relatives: Ziraldo Alves Pinto (father); Daniela Thomas (sister)
- Awards: World Soundtrack Award

Antônio Alves Pinto (born 1967) is a Brazilian film score composer. He is the son of the famous cartoonist Ziraldo and the brother of the film-maker Daniela Thomas. His work earned him a World Soundtrack Award and an ASCAP award, as well as a nomination in the Best Original Song category at the 65th Golden Globe Awards for writing the song "Despedida" with Shakira.

He has collaborated with director Asif Kapadia a number of times, providing the scores for Kapadia's biographical documentaries Senna, Amy and Diego Maradona. They are said to be collaborating on dystopian documentary 2073.

He composed the soundtrack to The Mosquito Coast and played the key instruments.

== Filmography ==
- 1994: Menino Maluquinho - O Filme
- 1995: Socorro Nobre
- 1998: O Primeiro Dia
- 1998: Menino Maluquinho 2 - A Aventura
- 1998: Central Station
- 1999: Notícias de Uma Guerra Particular
- 2001: Behind the Sun
- 2001: Palíndromo
- 2001: Onde a Terra Acaba
- 2002: City of Men (TV series)
- 2002: City of God
- 2002: A Janela Aberta
- 2004: Crónicas
- 2004: Nina
- 2004: Collateral (additional music)
- 2005: Lord of War
- 2005: All the Invisible Children
- 2005: Jonny Zero (TV series) (theme music)
- 2006: Journey to the End of the Night (actor)
- 2006: 10 Items or Less
- 2007: Love in the Time of Cholera
- 2007: City of Men
- 2007: Perfect Stranger
- 2009: The Vintner's Luck
- 2009: Adrift
- 2010: Lula, The Son of Brazil
- 2010: Senna
- 2012: Get the Gringo
- 2012: The Odyssey (with Dudu Aram)
- 2013: Snitch
- 2013: The Host
- 2014: Trash
- 2015: Self/less (with Dudu Aram)
- 2015: Amy
- 2015: McFarland, USA
- 2017: Shot Caller
- 2019: Diego Maradona
- 2019: The Boy Who Harnessed the Wind
- 2020: Nine Days
- 2020: Joe Bell
- 2021: The Mosquito Coast
- 2021: Awake
- 2021: Pelé
- 2024: 2073
