= Diego Maradona (film) =

2019 British documentary film by Asif Kapadia

- Theatrical release poster
- Directed by: Asif Kapadia
- Written by: Asif Kapadia
- Produced by: James Gay-Rees; Paul Martin
- Starring: Diego Maradona
- Edited by: Chris King
- Music by: Antônio Pinto
- Production companies: On The Corner; Film4
- Distributed by: Altitude Film Distribution
- Release dates: 19 May 2019 (Cannes); 14 June 2019 (UK)
- Running time: 130 minutes
- Country: United Kingdom
- Languages: Spanish; Italian; English
- Box office: $2.8 million

Diego Maradona is a 2019 British documentary film directed by Asif Kapadia about Argentine legend Diego Maradona with never before seen archival footage. It was screened out of competition at the 2019 Cannes Film Festival.

A British venture, the film was produced by On The Corner Film, in association with Film4 with Altitude Film serving as distributor. The film was theatrically released in the United Kingdom on 14 June 2019.

== Synopsis ==
Diego Maradona documents and revolves around the time Maradona transferred from FC Barcelona to SSC Napoli in 1984, eventually winning two Serie A titles and the 1988–89 UEFA Cup with the Italian team.

== Production ==
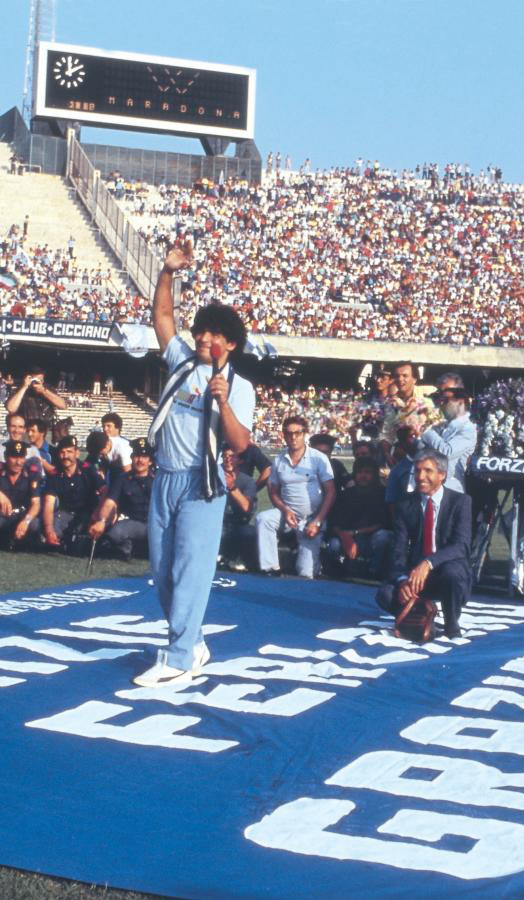
Maradona at the San Paolo Stadium presentation in Naples, 5 July 1984.

The concept of producing a documentary film about Maradona came after the director released the film Amy in 2015. Due to difficulty on finding a story with a beginning and an end, the director opted on Naples as being the centrepiece for the film. During the London Olympics in 2012, producer Paul Martin contacted the director after discovering archival footage but after the release of Senna the idea was pushed back. Martin and Gay-Rees met with someone outside of Naples who owned private material. The idea to document Maradona’s life began in 1981 by his first agent Jorge Cyterszpiler. This led to two Argentine cameramen recording hundreds of hours of film. However, the film never got produced. In Buenos Aires more archival footage was discovered in the home of Maradona’s ex-wife Claudia in a trunk untouched for 30 years.

== Release ==
The world premiere of Diego Maradona was screened out of competition at the 2019 Cannes Film Festival on 19 May 2019. The UK premiere was screened as the opening night film at the 26th Sheffield Doc/Fest on 6 June 2019. It was released in the United Kingdom on 14 June 2019 by Altitude Film Distribution. It had a theatrical limited release in the United States on 20 September and has been available on HBO on demand and HBO partners streaming platforms since 1 October 2019.

Spirit Entertainment is set to release Diego Maradona on digital, DVD and Blu-ray in the United Kingdom on 11 November 2019. The film debuted at No. 29 on the UK Official Film Chart on 20 November 2019.

== Reception ==
=== Box office ===
Diego Maradona grossed £966,936 ($1,174,464) in the United Kingdom and over $1,443,342 in other territories, for a total worldwide gross of $2,617,806. It made the largest share of its box office revenue in the United Kingdom as well. However, it failed to make any money at the domestic box office during its release in North America.

In the United Kingdom it grossed £284,949 ($358,787) from 139 cinemas in its opening weekend, finishing ninth at the box office. It grossed another £130,406 ($166,186) adding 53 screens for a total of 195 in its second weekend and grossing £609,735 ($777,029) through 10 days. Over four weeks it grossed a total of £850,268. It grossed £13,367 on 37 screens in its fifth weekend, grossing a total of £884,651 on the week ending 14 July. In its sixth weekend it made £10,410 ($13,016) across 19 cinemas and £1,872 on five screens in its tenth weekend for a total gross of £966,936.

=== Critical response ===
On review aggregator Rotten Tomatoes, the film holds an approval rating of 90% based on 81 reviews, with an average rating of 7.7/10. The website's critical consensus reads, "Diego Maradona traces the arc of a standard sports documentary, but illuminates its subject with uncommon clarity and depth." On Metacritic, the film holds a rating of 78 out of 100, based on 14 critics, indicating "generally favorable reviews".

== Soundtrack ==
An official soundtrack album Diego Maradona: Original Motion Picture Soundtrack was released worldwide on digital download only on 2 August 2019 by Lakeshore Records and features a twenty-eight track musical score all composed by Antonio Pinto.
