= Lula, o filho do Brasil (soundtrack) =

Soundtrack album by Antonio Pinto
- Released: December 1, 2009
- Genre: Film score
- Label: EMI Music Brasil

Lula, o filho do Brasil is the soundtrack album of the 2010 Brazilian film of the same name, which is reportedly the most expensive film of all time in the history of the country. The film's original soundtrack was composed by Antonio Pinto.

== Overview ==
Based on president Luiz Inácio Lula da Silva's early life, the film was released on January 1, 2010. Its soundtrack was released exactly a month earlier by EMI Music Brasil, marking the first time this ever happened in the Brazilian film market. The musical taste of Lula was faithfully followed in the preparation of the soundtrack. He requested the sertanejo duo Zezé Di Camargo & Luciano to record "Meu Primeiro Amor", a version of "Lejanía" by Paraguayan composer Herminio Giménez adapted into Portuguese by José Fortuna. The president also requested the inclusion of two remarkable songs in his life: "Nossa Canção", a romantic samba by Luiz Ayrão, recorded by Nana Caymmi especially for the soundtrack, and "Desesperar Jamais" by Ivan Lins and Vitor Martins, recorded by Ivan and samba player Roberto Ribeiro. The soundtrack is complemented with songs contemporary to the years represented in the film, such as "Sentimental Demais" by Altemar Dutra, "Estúpido Cupido" by Celly Campelo, "Saudosa Maloca" by Demônios da Garoa, and even "Pra Frente Brasil", an anthem for the Brazil national football team during the 1970 FIFA World Cup.

== Track listing ==
No.	Title	Writer(s)	Artist	Length
1.	"Meu Primeiro Amor (Lejanía)"	Herminio Giménez / José Fortuna	Zezé Di Camargo & Luciano
2.	"Nossa Canção (Preste Atenção)"	Luiz Ayrão	Nana Caymmi
3.	"Vida Nova (Instrumental)"	Antonio Pinto
4.	"Saudosa Maloca"	Adoniran Barbosa	Demônios da Garoa
5.	"Estúpido Cupido (Stupid Cupid)"	Howard Greenfield, Neil Sedaka / Fred Jorge	Celly Campelo
6.	"Sentimental Demais"	Jair Amorim, Evaldo Gouveia	Altemar Dutra
7.	"Pra Frente Brasil"	Miguel Gustavo	Coral de JOAB
8.	"Cidadão"	Lucio Barbosa	José Geraldo
9.	"Você"	Tim Maia	Tm Maia
10.	"Teima (Instrumental)"	Antonio Pinto
11.	"Desesperar Jamais"	Ivan Lins, Vitor Martins	Ivan Lins featuring Roberto Ribeiro
12.	"Como Vai Você"	Antônio Marcos, Mário Marcos	Antônio Marcos
13.	"Pau de Arara"	Luiz Gonzaga, Guio de Moraes	Luiz Gonzaga
14.	"Jornada (Instrumental)"	Antonio Pinto
