= 2073 (film) =

2024 film by Asif Kapadia

- British official release poster
- Directed by: Asif Kapadia
- Screenplay by: Asif Kapadia; Tony Grisoni
- Based on: La Jetée by Chris Marker
- Produced by: George Chignell; Asif Kapadia
- Starring: Samantha Morton; Naomi Ackie; Hector Hewer
- Cinematography: Bradford Young
- Edited by: Chris King
- Music by: Antonio Pinto
- Production companies: Neon; Double Agent; Film4
- Distributed by: Neon (United States); Altitude Film Distribution (United Kingdom)
- Release dates: 3 September 2024 (Venice); 27 December 2024 (United Kingdom)
- Running time: 83 minutes
- Countries: United Kingdom; United States
- Language: English
- Box office: $56,269

2073 is a 2024 science fiction docudrama film directed by Asif Kapadia, co-written with Tony Grisoni. It stars Samantha Morton, Naomi Ackie, Hector Hewer, Maria Ressa, Carole Cadwalladr and Rana Ayyub. Set in a dystopian future, the film is inspired by Chris Marker's 1962 featurette La Jetée. It takes on the big subjects of climate change, corporate fascism, the global erosion of democracy through the rise of fascism and fictionally depicts a future where these forces are allowed to continue unchecked.

The docudrama premiered out of competition of the 81st Venice International Film Festival on 3 September 2024. It was theatrically released in the United Kingdom by Neon on 27 December.

== Plot ==
In 2073, a survivor in New San Francisco reflects on how climate change, governance, and surveillance technology transformed the world, while her experience is combined with archival footage warning of potential future outcomes.

== Cast ==
- Samantha Morton as Ghost
- Naomi Ackie
- Hector Hewer
- Maria Ressa
- Carole Cadwalladr
- Rana Ayyub
- Ben Rhodes
- Rahima Mahmut
- Silkie Carlo
- Cori Crider
- George Monbiot
- Nina Schick
- Douglass Rushkof
- Carmody Grey
- Tristan Harris
- James O’Brien
- Anne Applebaum
- Antony Lowenstein

== Production ==
In September 2022, it was reported that Neon, Double Agent, and Film4 will co-finance and act as executive producers of the film, with Kapadia and George Chignell producing it. Davis Guggenheim, Nicole Stott, and Jonathan Silberberg acted as executive producers for Concordia Studio alongside Riz Ahmed's Left Handed Films.

== Release ==
2073 had its world premiere as part of the 'Out of Competition – Non-Fiction' at the 81st Venice International Film Festival. It was first screened on 3 September 2024 at Sala Grande. It was also presented in 'Strands: Debate' section of the 2024 BFI London Film Festival on 16 October 2024.

The film competed in the 57th Sitges Film Festival in the 'Oficial Fantàstic Competició' section. It was screened on 11 October 2024. The film was released in the United Kingdom by Neon on 27 December 2024.

== Reception ==
On the review aggregator website Rotten Tomatoes, 48% of 44 critics' reviews are positive. Metacritic, which uses a weighted average, assigned the film a score of 52 out of 100, based on 10 critics, indicating "mixed or average" reviews.

Peter Bradshaw of The Guardian rated the film three stars out of five, and wrote: "2073 is certainly a relevant shout of rage against the authoritarian forces despoiling our democracy and our environment—and the bland and complaisant naivety that’s letting it happen."

Lee Marshall for Screen Daily give it positive review, writing: "Does the alternation between documentary inserts and sci-fi superstructure work? Not always... But Kapadia and his co-scribe Tony Grisoni seem to understand that the pummelled audience can take only so much cinematic doomscrolling."

Monica Castillo wrote on RogerEbert.com: "Using different case studies from around the world, Kapadia sees signs of our road to ruin already in the works, unabashedly showing the brutality and violence of what's happened as a precursor to what will be...2073 is a slick video essay within the trappings of a sci-fi movie, but there's not enough narratively to grab audiences beyond the scaremongering."

Matthew Carey for Deadline Hollywood give it a positive review, stating: "There’s a disturbing plausibility to director Asif Kapadia’s docudrama 2073". He concluded the review with quote from film: "This is not fiction. This is not documentary. This is a warning."

Robbie Collin for The Daily Telegraph rated the film two stars out of five, and wrote: "The conceit of a film as a warning from the future is a promising one, but 2073 feels more like political signalling for the present".

Roberto Oggiano reviewing at 2024 BFI London Film Festival for Cineuropa wrote, "Asif Kapadia’s new movie is a documentary with apocalyptic undertones which takes a confused approach to blending the past, the present and the future, reality and fiction."

Davide Abbatescianni writing for New Scientist underscored how the scope of Kapadia's film is "too broad" and oversimplifies complex issues. He added: "While individual facts cited are often correct, the way they are linked can loosely resemble works where shedding light on global issues becomes a platform for diving into conspiracy theories."

Guardian journalist Carole Cadwalladr, who appears in the film, covers its context. She describes how the experiences of director Kapadia growing up in Hackney, being placed on a United States watchlist, and observing reporters opposing repressive regimes today have likely influenced the film.

=== Accolades ===
The film was selected in Competition at the 57th Sitges Film Festival, thus it was nominated to compete for Best Feature Film award.

Award	Date	Category	Recipient	Result	Ref.
Sitges Film Festival	13 October 2024	Best Feature Film	2073	Nominated	
