= McFarland, USA (soundtrack) =

McFarland, USA (Original Motion Picture Soundtrack)

Film score by Antônio Pinto and various artists
- Released: February 17, 2015
- Studio: The Village
- Genre: Latin pop
- Length: 46:31
- Label: Walt Disney
- Producer: Antônio Pinto; Niki Caro; Ryan Hopman

Antonio Pinto chronology
Trash (2014)	McFarland, USA (2015)	Amy (2015)

Singles from McFarland, USA (Original Motion Picture Soundtrack)
- 1. "Juntos (Together)" Released: January 20, 2015

McFarland, USA (Original Motion Picture Soundtrack) is the soundtrack album to the 2015 film McFarland, USA directed by Niki Caro for Walt Disney Pictures, starring Kevin Costner, Maria Bello and Morgan Saylor. The film is scored by Antônio Pinto who previously collaborated with Caro on The Vintner's Luck (2009).

Colombian singer-songwriter Juanes wrote an original song for the film, titled "Juntos (Together)" and was released as a single on January 20, 2015. The soundtrack was released on February 17, 2015, featuring Pinto's score, the earlier released single and selections of songs from the film.

== Track listing ==
No.	Title	Artist(s)	Length
1.	"Juntos (Together)"	Juanes	3:18
2.	"The Real McFarlands"	Antônio Pinto	2:39
3.	"Me and Baby Brother"	War	3:26
4.	"Let's Hit It Again"	Antônio Pinto	1:54
5.	"Lord's Prayer"	Antônio Pinto	3:48
6.	"Watermelon Man"	Mongo Santamaría	2:26
7.	"Barbie Bike"	Antônio Pinto	1:45
8.	"Flash Light"	Parliament	4:29
9.	"Convoy to State"	Antônio Pinto	2:05
10.	"Whittier Blvd."	Thee Midniters	2:28
11.	"Beach"	Antônio Pinto	2:26
12.	"This Ain't Golf"	Antônio Pinto	2:10
13.	"That's Not Danny Diaz"	Antônio Pinto	7:52
14.	"McFarland Theme"	Antônio Pinto	2:43
15.	"América"	Los Tigres del Norte	3:02
Total length:			46:31

== Reception ==
Alex Reif of LaughingPlace wrote "There will surely be those that buy it solely for the songs and they should be entranced by the score. Those that buy it for the score are getting a great selection of compositions from the film but may be disappointed that the full film score isn't available."

Stephen Farber of The Hollywood Reporter and Justin Chang of Variety noted the "guitar-based" score accompanying the film to be "swelling". Andy Vasoyan of Neon Tommy wrote "the score put together by Antonio Pinto leaves nothing to chance". Steven Rea of The Philadelphia Inquirer wrote that "the music rocks with a hearty Latin beat".

== Personnel ==
Credits adapted from AllMusic:

- Aimee Kreston – Violin
- Alan Kaplan – Trombone
- Alex Iles – Trombone
- Alma Fernandez – Viola
- Alyssa Park – Violin
- Andrew Duckles – Viola
- Antônio Pinto – Composer, Score Producer
- Armen Anassian – Violin
- Booker White – Music Preparation
- Charlie Bisharat – Violin
- Charlie Morillas – Trombone
- Clayton Haslop – Concert Master, Violin
- Dave Walther – Viola
- David Low – Cello, Orchestra Contractor
- David Parmeter – String Bass
- Dennis Karmazyn – Cello
- Dudu Aram – Programming
- Dylan Hart – French Horn
- Ed Côrtes – Conductor, Orchestration
- Erick Labson – Mastering
- Erik Rynearson – Viola
- Evan Wilson – Viola
- Geoffrey Osika – String Bass
- Grace Oh – Violin
- Jacob Braun – Cello
- Jason Lippmann – Cello
- Jeff Gartenbaum – Assistant Engineer
- Jenny Kim – French Horn
- John Kurlander – Engineer, Mixing
- Jonathan Karoly – Cello
- Juan Luis Guerra – Producer
- Juanes – Composer, Primary Artist
- Kathleen Sloan – Violin
- Kevin Connolly – Violin
- Laura Pearson – Viola
- Lisa Liu – Violin
- Lucia Micarelli – Violin
- Luiz Vanzato – Assistant
- Luke Maurer – Viola
- Marilia Franco – Score Coordinator
- Mark Robertson – Violin
- Maurice Grants – Cello
- Michael Valerio – String Bass
- Mitchell Leib – Executive in Charge of Music, Soundtrack Producer
- Mitchell Newman – Violin
- Natalie Leggett – Violin
- Neli Nikolaeva – Violin
- Niki Caro – Soundtrack Producer
- Phillip Levy – Violin
- Rafael Rishik – Violin
- Robert Brophy – Viola
- Roberto Cani – Violin
- Robin Whittaker – Editing
- Roger Wilkie – Violin
- Ryan Hopman – Producer
- Sarah Thornblade – Violin
- Songa Lee – Violin
- Steve Gerdes – Design
- Steven Becknell – French Horn
- Susan Rishik – Violin
- Tereza Stanislav – Violin
- Thom Russo – Mixing
- Thomas Harte Jr. – String Bass
- Timothy Loo – Cello
- Trevor Handy – Cello
- Vanessa Freebairn-Smith – Cello
- Xiao-Dan Zheng – Cello

== Chart performance ==
Chart performance for The Purge: Election Year (Original Motion Picture Soundtrack)
Chart (2016)	Peak position
UK Soundtrack Albums (OCC)	38
US Soundtrack Albums (Billboard)	20

== Accolades ==
Award	Category	Recipient(s) and nominee(s)	Result	Ref.
International Film Music Critics Association	Best Original Score for a Drama Film	Antônio Pinto	Nominated	
