= Newport Film School =

Former school of UoW, Newport, Wales

- Ysgol Ffilm Casnewydd
- Type: Public
- Active: 1966–2016
- Students: 500
- Location: Clarence Place, Newport (1966–1989); Caerleon Campus (1989–2011); Newport City Campus (2011–2016), Wales

Newport Film School, also known as The International Film School Wales, was part of Newport School of Art, Media and Design at the University of Wales, Newport. It was considered the leading institution for the promotion and development of the audiovisual culture of Wales through higher-level education, research and training. It had approximately 500 undergraduate and postgraduate students studying a range of film-related courses.

The Newport Film School was set up in 1966 by Principal John Wright who invited the renowned documentary film maker John Grierson to become its Patron. Grierson's editorial assistant Harley Jones became the first Lecturer in Cinematography setting up the course with five students and one Bolex camera. Working with 16mm film, students made a mix of personal and sponsored films; many then went on to work in the BBC or ITV as editors and cameramen (e.g. George Bailey, Graham Horder, David Jones, Martin Elsbury) or became independent producers (e.g. Geoffrey Wynne Thomas, Richard Oliver Watkins). In more recent years, BBC documentary director Christopher Morris (An American in Aberfan) lead the Documentary Film BA degree course and award-winning director Florence Ayisi (Sisters in Law) lead the Film & Video BA course. The curses were supported by HTV and students were able to have attachments to the film unit.

The lower floor of the building housed the animation section that was run by Henry Lutman who went on to develop stop frame animation techniques. Harley made Wales In trust for the national trust of Wales that was introduced by HRH Prince Charles.

In 2004 Oscar-nominated director Ken Russell was appointed visiting professor to the university and annually attended the graduation film presentation evening from June 2004 'Finest Films' where third-year BA graduates showcased their final practical pieces and received awards in the style of traditional film awards such as 'Best Director'.

The film school prided itself on a successful parallel mixture of theory study and practical creativity which it believed drove the unique quality of its filmmakers. Graduates have included such talents as Justin Kerrigan (Human Traffic) and double BAFTA-award-winning Asif Kapadia. In 2011 the school moved from the Caerleon Campus to a £40 million purpose built City Campus in the centre of Newport, however the Newport Film School closed following the 2013 merger between the University of Glamorgan and the University of Wales, Newport. which formed the University of South Wales. Many of the courses relocated to Cardiff, housed in a converted former BT office block, however many of the lecturers found alternative employment elsewhere, notable to Falmouth University were Christopher Morris is now the Director of the School of Film & Television.

== Notable alumni ==
- Philip John, director and screenwriter
- Kirk Jones, film director and screenwriter
- Asif Kapadia, filmmaker
- Scott Barley, filmmaker and artist
- Justin Kerrigan, writer and director
- Teddy Soeriaatmadja, film director
