= Joan Villadelprat =

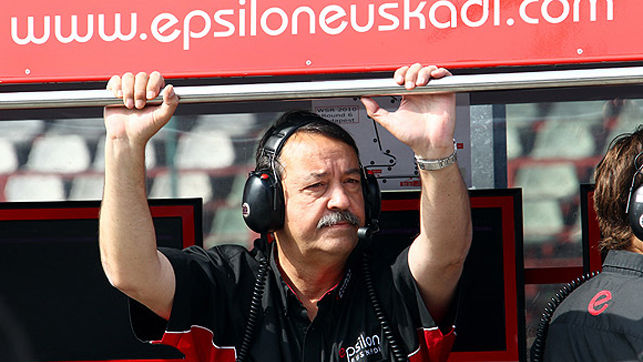
- Villadelprat in 2016
- Born: Joan Villadelprat i Bernal; 15 November 1955 (age 70); Barcelona, Spain

Joan Villadelprat i Bernal (born 15 November 1955) is the principal of the Spanish race team Epsilon Euskadi. He worked for McLaren, Ferrari and Tyrrell Racing before joining Benetton Formula. He was formerly Operations Director and Team Manager at Benetton Formula until 1999, he then worked for Prost Grand Prix as managing director. After the closure of Prost Grand Prix he left Formula 1.

== Prost Grand Prix ==
In November 2000, Alain Prost employed Joan Villadelprat as his managing director.

== Epsilon Euskadi ==
Villadelprat was instrumental in Epsilon Euskadi's failed attempted entry into the 2010 Formula 1 season.

Joan Villadelprat writes F1 articles for Spanish newspaper El País.

== Epsilon scandal and Supreme Court sentence ==
Epsilon Euskadi ee1 founder Joan Villadelprat and Mark Phillip Payne were taken to court in Vitoria (Spain) under allegations of corruption and negligent management of public funding granted by the Basque Country government when Juan Jose Ibarratxe was president. Juan Jose Ibarretxe was president elected of the Basque Nationalist Party.

In June 2016, the Spanish Civil Supreme Court gave Villadepprat a guilty sentence and demanded Villadelprat pay a fine of 899.263 Euros for his responsibility in the bankruptcy of the Firm Epsilon, a Formula 1 aspirations firm. Joan, who received public funding from the Basque Country Government, was also found guilty by the Spanish Trading Court and banned for three years from managing third parties goods or funds.
