= Allegations of cheating during the 1994 Formula One World Championship =

Allegations of cheating were made throughout the 1994 Formula One World Championship. Several Formula One teams were involved, with the main allegations surrounding Benetton Formula. Initially, Benetton was alleged to have been using illegal traction control software to their advantage in races; however, this could not be sufficiently proven by the FIA and was only confirmed in 2015 when Willem Toet, one of Benetton's engineers that season, wrote an article on his Linkedin account describing how the team developed a traction control system using spark cutting. A refuelling fire on Jos Verstappen's Benetton car at the 1994 German Grand Prix led to renewed allegations and an investigation by Intertechnique at Benetton's team factory. Following the investigation, the FIA revealed Benetton had been using a fuel valve without a fuel filter, which allowed fuel into the car 12.5% faster than a legal fuel valve. Renewed allegations led to rumours of Michael Schumacher quitting the team. Schumacher would end up staying with Benetton for the 1995 Formula One season, also winning the Drivers' World Championship that season, before joining Ferrari for the 1996 Formula One season where he would stay until the 2006 Formula One season, winning five additional Drivers' titles in the process.

Following the 1994 San Marino Grand Prix, the Benetton, Ferrari, and McLaren teams were investigated on suspicion of breaking the FIA-imposed ban on electronic aids. Benetton and McLaren initially refused to hand over their source code for investigation. When they did so, the FIA discovered hidden functionality in both teams' software but no evidence that it had been used in a race. Both teams were fined $100,000 for their initial refusal to cooperate. The McLaren software, which was a gearbox program that allowed automatic shifts, was deemed legal. By contrast, the Benetton software was deemed to be a form of launch control that would have allowed Schumacher to make perfect starts, which was explicitly outlawed by the regulations; Benetton and Willem Toet, a Formula One aerodynamicist for over thirty years who worked at Benetton until 1994, stated that traction control was legally achieved through rotational inertia. There was no evidence to suggest the software was used.

== Background ==
The technical regulations for the 1994 Formula One season were announced at the 1993 Canadian Grand Prix. One of the major announcements was that electronic aids were to be banned, which included power brakes and traction control systems. Also banned for the 1994 season was the use of anti-lock braking systems (ABS) and active suspension. This was done as there were fears that electronic aid systems were levelling the field up, putting more emphasis on the car rather than driver talent. Some spoke out against traction control, including Ayrton Senna, who said he preferred to have more control of the car instead of having the computers drive it for him. Ironically, Senna would later say that he believed there would be a lot of accidents during the 1994 season since no attempts were being made to slow the cars down while taking said driver aids away. Max Mosley, the president of Formula One's governing body, the FIA, spoke in favour of banning traction control, saying that the systems "could be extremely dangerous and unpredictable".

Around the same time as the announcement regarding the technical regulations for the 1994 season, many in the sport were questioning the legality of active suspensions, which was a key factor in their ban for 1994. Some in the paddock regarded the decision as an attempt to restrict Williams, as the team held a strong advantage with its active suspension and other driver aids. The unraced concept of continuously variable transmission (CVT) was also banned; it was well known that Williams had spent several years developing and testing such a system, which threatened to further increase their cars' advantage if introduced.

Behind the scenes at Williams, they considered the timing of the announcement as "regrettable", with some questioning if Nigel Mansell's 1992 Formula One World Championship victory would still be regarded as valid. Also introduced for the 1994 season was refuelling during races for the first time since 1983. As a result, all team personnel working on the car during pit stops had to wear fire-protective clothing as a safety precaution. The FIA changed the rules to increase interest in the sport partially due to declining television ratings from the 1993 season compared to the 1992 season. It was also suggested the rule changes could benefit the Ferrari team, as the outfit had struggled with the introduction of its driver aids, and stood to gain from the re-introduction of refuelling due to its V12 engine configuration, which was less fuel-efficient than the V10s and V8s built by their rivals.

== Initial allegations ==
Cheating allegations were made at the 1994 Brazilian Grand Prix, the first round of the season. On lap 21 of the race, Senna in the Williams who was leading the race, made a pit stop, with Michael Schumacher in the Benetton close behind. The Benetton pitcrew made a very quick stop for Schumacher, getting him out in front of Senna to lead the race. Schumacher went on to win the Grand Prix after Senna spun out of the race. This sparked speculation that Benetton was using a system to make quicker pit stops than their rivals.

During the weekend of the 1994 Pacific Grand Prix, Ferrari test driver Nicola Larini (who had replaced Jean Alesi for the early part of the season) leaked to the Italian media that he had used traction control during the practice session for the race. Ferrari and Larini later denied the claims to the worldwide press. The leak by Larini further raised suspicions about teams using illegal driver aids to help them in races. Senna retired on the first lap of the race after a collision with McLaren driver Mika Häkkinen. Instead of going back to the Williams pit area, Senna opted to stand and watch the cars complete the race to see if he could hear any noises that suggested traction control was being used illegally in the other cars. Senna returned to the Williams pit area after the race suspicious that the Benetton car was illegal.

== Rule changes ==
At the 1994 San Marino Grand Prix, both Senna and Roland Ratzenberger suffered fatal accidents. After the race weekend, the FIA asked the teams that finished first, second and third in the race (Benetton, Ferrari, and McLaren, respectively) to provide copies of their engine management system's source code to see if a traction control system was being stored. Ferrari supplied the code immediately, while McLaren and Benetton only handed over the code after the FIA's deadline, for which they were fined $100,000. Prior to this, the FIA had agreed to view a demonstration of the Benetton system at Cosworth's engine facility, as Cosworth considered the software to be their property and refused to give Benetton permission to provide it to the FIA.

Several technical rule changes were announced by the FIA at the 1994 Monaco Grand Prix to help improve the safety of the cars. Downforce on the cars was reduced with the diffuser restricted to help reduce the amount of grip available. In between the Monaco and Spanish Grands Prix, the teams tried out the revised cars in test sessions throughout the week. Several teams experienced problems with their revised cars; Ligier suffered two cracked wing mountings, while Williams noted a cracked mounting during testing at the Jerez Circuit. The biggest incident was that of Pedro Lamy in a Lotus car at the Silverstone Circuit. While approaching the Bridge corner on the circuit, the rear wing on the Lotus detached itself leading to a sudden loss of downforce. The Lotus cartwheeled off the circuit at 170 mph (270 km/h), flying through a protective fence, landing in a spectator access tunnel. Lamy was hospitalised as a result of the accident. In the week leading up to the 1994 Spanish Grand Prix, Benetton team boss Flavio Briatore criticised the FIA, accusing the president Max Mosley of making "ill-considered, snap decisions" and that some of the components on the Benetton car may not have been subjected to quality control checks. In a letter sent to Mosley on May 25, Briatore also said:

It will be theirs and the FIA's responsibility that they race. Now that the teams have had an opportunity to test and evaluate the Barcelona regulation changes, it has become apparent that there are serious problems. The stability and consistency of cars have worsened. This can be confirmed by discussions with the majority of teams and their drivers. The cornering speed of the cars may have been reduced, but the likelihood of an accident has been increased. Several teams are experiencing structural failures that are attributable to the change in regulations. The loading on key components, such as rear wings, has changed and moved outside the designed range. Despite these concerns, you continue to insist on these ill-conceived measures. It is our opinion that the ability of yourself and your advisers to judge technical and safety issues in F1 must be questioned.

The Benetton team, along with Williams, McLaren, Lotus, Pacific, Simtek, Jordan, Footwork Arrows, and Ligier debated the issue in the Williams motorhome to discuss the technical regulations. More changes came into force for the 1994 Canadian Grand Prix on 12 June and the 1994 German Grand Prix on 31 July, with the introductions of pump fuel (more closely related to commercially available fuel, slightly reducing horsepower, and engine performance) and the plank (a piece of wood running along the underside of the chassis that is monitored for excessive wear, increasing ride height and thus decreasing grip).

== Renewed allegations ==
Allegations of cheating reignited at the 1994 French Grand Prix when, starting from third on the grid, Schumacher overtook both of the Williams drivers, Damon Hill and Nigel Mansell, leading into the first corner of the race. This again raised suspicions that Benetton were using traction control. There were also incidents involving other teams, notably Ferrari and McLaren. While commentating on the race for Eurosport with John Watson and Allard Kalff, Williams driver David Coulthard, who was replaced by Mansell for the race, stated that Schumacher's start reminded him of the type of starts from the 1993 season when traction control was legal.

In July 1994, the FIA announced that it had analyzed Benetton's black boxes from Imola and found a launch control system in the software. It included what appeared to be a hidden trigger system which was highly suspicious. During the investigation several discrepancies regarding the capabilities of the system were found, some even surprising Benetton. The investigation showed it could be switched on by a laptop PC, that Benetton's menu did not reveal launch control as an option, and that it was an option but it was not visible (Option 13). Although the team admitted the existence of the code, it argued it was redundant and could not be activated by Schumacher. Benetton further stated that the driver's aid was only used in testing and that it was elaborate in order to prevent it being switched on accidentally, and that the launch control could only be started by recompilation of the source code. The rules at the time only prevented the use of traction control, not the existence of software that might be used to implement it. As the FIA had no proof it was being used, no action was taken. The FIA ultimately issued a statement concerning the investigation of the alleged use of an automatic start system by Benetton at Imola. The conclusion was that "the best evidence is that Benetton Formula Ltd was not using 'launch control' at the 1994 San Marino Grand Prix". Had the evidence proved otherwise, Benetton faced being excluded from the World Championships.

Willem Toet, the Head of Aerodynamics for Benetton in 1994, stated that traction control was legally achieved through rotational inertia. He also expressed his belief it was Schumacher's technique that Senna initially mistook for illegal traction control during the Pacific Grand Prix. He suggested that Schumacher's technique of braking with his left foot could have fooled Senna into thinking the Benetton was illegal. This opinion was not widely accepted as the LFB technique had been used in Formula One since the early 1970s. In fact, Senna's own teammate Gerhard Berger was known to have used left foot braking in 1992 when he had been Senna's teammate.

Hill was on pole position for the 1994 British Grand Prix after qualifying fastest. During the parade lap on the way to the starting grid, Schumacher, starting second, illegally overtook Hill. As a result of this maneuver, Schumacher was given a five-second penalty 27 minutes after the original incident. Schumacher never came into the pit lane to serve the penalty when originally given the penalty, and on lap 21 was given the black flag. Schumacher stayed out on the circuit while Benetton team boss Briatore, along with Benetton technical director Tom Walkinshaw went to discuss it with race director Roland Bruynseraede, arguing that they had not been properly informed of the penalty. Schumacher eventually served the time penalty on lap 27, finishing the race in second position behind Hill. After the British Grand Prix, Schumacher and Benetton were fined $25,000 for breaching Formula One sporting regulations, with the FIA choosing to open an investigation surrounding the events at the race. Joan Villadelprat, Benetton's team manager, stated that although they made a mistake at the race, the race stewards also made a mistake as Benetton was not notified within 15 minutes of the offence as specified by the regulations.

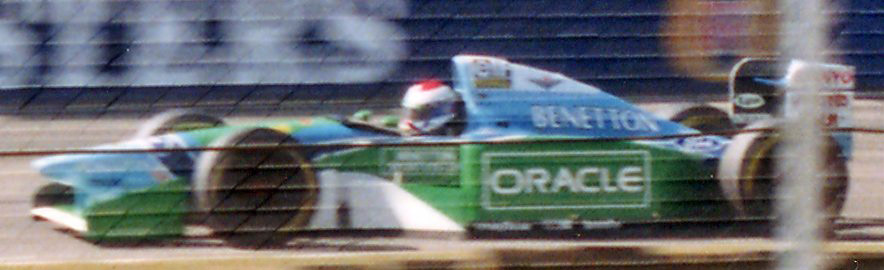
Jos Verstappen, who suffered minor burns after a pit stop fire during the German Grand Prix.

The 1994 German Grand Prix brought up more controversy leading to further allegations of cheating by Benetton. During a pit stop, the Benetton car of Jos Verstappen caught fire during refuelling as the fuel nozzle would not enter the car properly. Verstappen suffered minor burns, with four of the Benetton mechanics also burned. Intertechnique, the company that manufactured the refuelling equipment for all the teams, was delegated by the governing body to examine the Benetton factory shortly after the German race. After Intertechnique's examination, a statement was released by the FIA, stating that "the [fuel] valve was slow to close because of the presence of a foreign body" and that a filter designed to eliminate any possible risk of fire had been removed. An estimate by an outside party stated that without the filter, fuel flowed into the car at a 12.5% faster rate than usual, saving one second per pit stop.

Benetton issued a press release shortly after, announcing that they had contacted an "independent company specialising in accident investigation" to give opinions on the refuelling method. They also announced that a copy of the FIA report had been sent to Marriott Harrison, their legal advisers. As a result of their findings, the FIA announced that Benetton would be summoned to a World Motor Sport Council meeting on 19 October. On 11 August, three days before the 1994 Hungarian Grand Prix, Intertechnique representatives said that no request had been sent from Benetton to remove the filter from the nozzle and that they would never authorise Benetton to remove the nozzle. Benetton issued a press release on August 13, stating that there was a fault in the equipment provided by Intertechnique.

Before Schumacher's appeal from his disqualification at the British Grand Prix, he was disqualified from the 1994 Belgian Grand Prix as his Benetton had excessive wear of the plank. The FIA allowed the ten millimetre deep plank, with one millimeter of wear allowance meaning that the plank must be a minimum of nine millimetres after the race to be deemed legal. A majority of the plank on Schumacher's car measured 7.4 millimetres, well under the legal tolerance. Benetton, along with Schumacher, argued that the plank had excessive wear due to a spin by Schumacher during the race. The damage to the plank from the spin was visible further down the plank and was not the cause for the infraction. Benetton launched an immediate appeal, with a FIA World Motor Sport Council meeting set for 5 September. Benetton's appeal was rejected and Schumacher's disqualification was upheld.

The allegations of Benetton cheating throughout the summer of 1994 led to rumours of Schumacher quitting the team. The team released a statement denying the rumours, stating that Schumacher would complete the season, which he ultimately did by winning the 1994 Formula One Drivers' World Championship, although the win also proved to be controversial on its own at the 1994 Australian Grand Prix, the season's final round. Although the Schumacher–Hill collision was ultimately deemed a racing incident and the Drivers' Championship had been decided in a similar manner in 1989 and 1990, public opinion was divided over the incident, and Schumacher was vilified in the British media. The two-race ban punishment that ultimately led to a one-point gap heading into the season finale at Adelaide was seen by many observers as petty and insignificant, and that it was a result of Benetton feud with the FIA, with Schumacher being a victim and the FIA trying to deny him his first World Championship.

== FIA action ==
Schumacher and Benetton, along with three other drivers, were summoned to a FIA World Motor Sport Council meeting on 26 July to discuss his black flag at the British Grand Prix. It was announced at the meeting that Schumacher was disqualified from the race, thus losing his six points he earned from finishing second in the race, and he was also handed a two-race ban. This meant Schumacher would miss his home race, the German Grand Prix, along with the Hungarian Grand Prix, unless he chose to appeal the decision. In addition to the punishment handed to Schumacher, Benetton was fined a total of $500,000 to $600,000 for not listening to the stewards' at the British race and $100,000 for not sending copies of their engine management system when immediately requested. At the council meeting, the governing body also announced that no evidence had been found to suggest Benetton were using illegal electronic systems but said that an illegal system existed, which could be activated at any time. Benetton and Schumacher appealed the decision made by the FIA, allowing the German to race at his home Grand Prix.

Both Michael Schumacher and the Benetton Formula team feel that the penalties inflicted on them were very severe. Together both parties have agreed to appeal in front of the International Court of the Appeal of the FIA through the respective National Sporting Authorities, and therefore Michael Schumacher will take part in the upcoming 1994 German Grand Prix. This decision has been reached following the concern from both Michael Schumacher and the Benetton Formula team that Michael's absence from his home Grand Prix would unfairly penalise and disappoint all the German fans who have long awaited this event. Michael Schumacher and the Benetton Formula hope that this appeal will result in a decreased penalty. Their priority now is to prepare for a winning performance this weekend.

— Benetton press release in the aftermath of the decision made by the FIA.

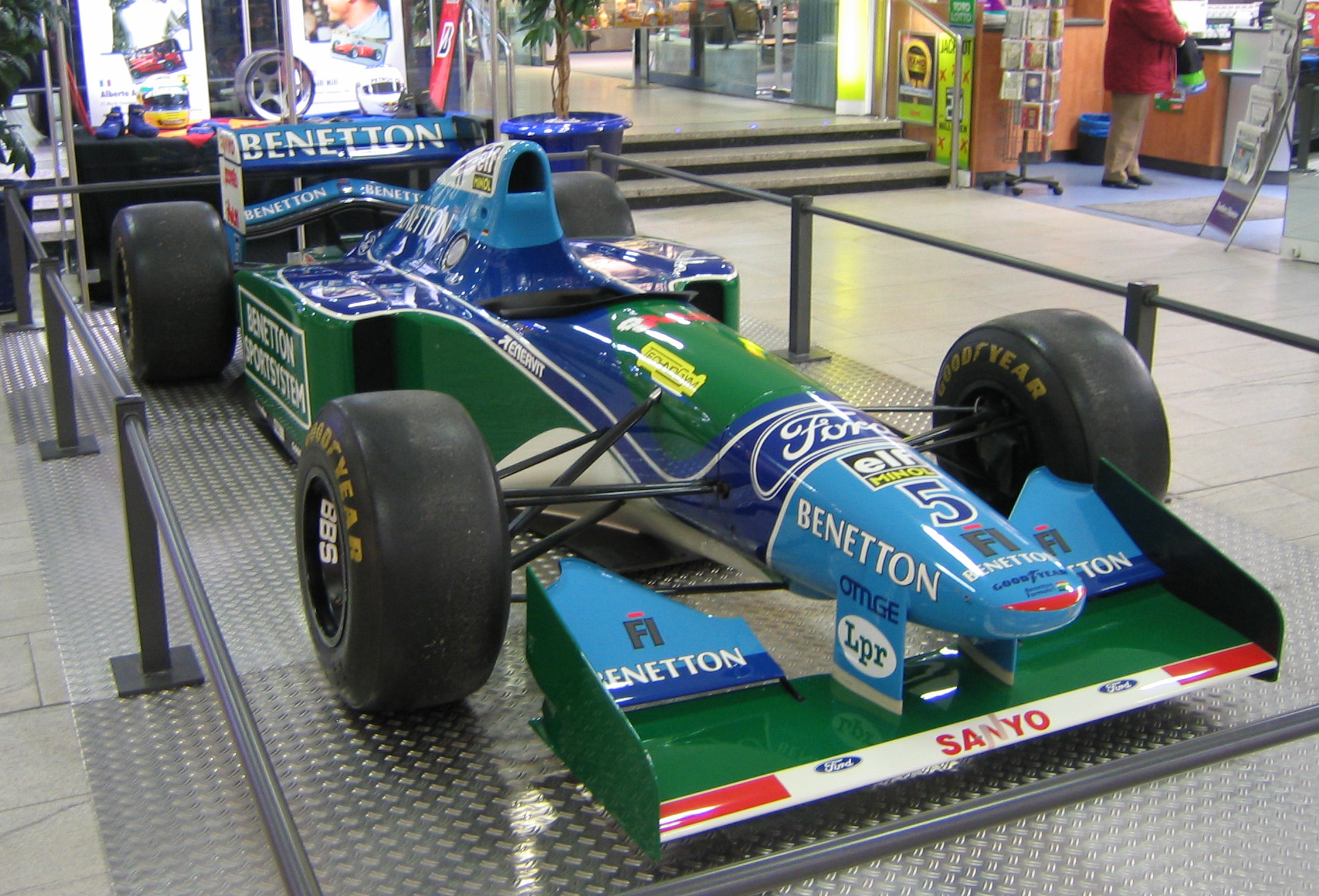
Michael Schumacher's Benetton B194, which caused controversy during the 1994 Formula One season.

Schumacher's appeal regarding the two race ban was rejected at the FIA International Court of Appeal, with the FIA opting to keep his two race ban intact, meaning he would miss the 1994 Italian Grand Prix on 11 September and the 1994 Portuguese Grand Prix on 25 September. JJ Lehto replaced Schumacher for the two races.

The World Motor Sport Council hearing surrounding Benetton and the fuel fire at Hockenheim was brought forward to 7 September, with the disqualification of Schumacher at the Belgian Grand Prix also moved to the same day. The night before the hearing, the FIA were informed by Larrousse, one of the other teams competing in the championship, that they were informed by Intertechnique in May to remove the filter from the refuelling rig, a point Flavio Briatore made in prior meetings that all but four teams had removed the filter. The FIA in the hearing judged that Benetton had not tried to cheat by removing the filter from the refuelling rig but said that the team removed it without authorisation from Intertechnique to try to gain an advantage. Thus, the team were found guilty of the offence but escaped punishment due to this valid plea in mitigation. Schumacher's appeal against his disqualification at the Belgian Grand Prix was rejected by the FIA. After the hearing, Benetton released a statement, which said:

The Mild Seven Benetton Ford Formula 1 Team is very pleased with the result of today's hearing in Paris, which has completely cleared its good name from any allegations of cheating. Whilst the team may not have been able to satisfy the World Council as to the precise cause of the wear of the skid board it was delighted that the FIA stated in clear terms that there was no question of the team cheating. The team was also completely cleared of the charge of removing the fuel filter illegally. This should put an end to unfounded and wild speculations in the press that the removal of the filter caused the fire at Hockenheim. Before the hearing, the FIA conceded that it was not alleging that the removal of the filter had caused the fire. In giving the World Council's decision, the President [Max Mosley] stated that its unanimous view was that the filter was removed in complete good faith and that it would be inappropriate to impose any penalty whatsoever.

— Benetton press release in the aftermath of the decision made by the FIA regarding the German Grand Prix refuelling fire.

At the same hearing, the McLaren team was found to be in breach of the technical regulations over a fully-automatic gearbox upshift device in the transmission system that was confirmed to have been run in Mika Häkkinen's car during the San Marino Grand Prix. The FIA's discovery of this device occurred when McLaren test driver Philippe Alliot, who had taken a race seat at Larrousse mid-season, commented on the fact that the cars of his new team did not possess such a facility. The system was found to contravene the regulations and was duly banned, as was the potential of an automatic downshift facility. McLaren went unpunished because the FIA was satisfied that the team believed it to be legal when fitting it to the car under its interpretation of the regulations.

== Legacy ==
By the 2001 Formula One season, the FIA admitted that it had trouble patrolling driver aids and effective from the 2001 Spanish Grand Prix a decision was made to permit traction control, launch control, and fully automatic transmissions once more. Launch control and fully automatic transmissions were banned again for the 2004 Formula One season, followed by teams being required to use identical electronic control units for the 2008 Formula One season to prevent teams from concealing traction control and other electronic driver aids.
