= Senna (film) =

2010 film by Asif Kapadia

- Theatrical release poster
- Directed by: Asif Kapadia
- Written by: Manish Pandey
- Produced by: Chris Berend; Tim Bevan; Eric Fellner; James Gay-Rees
- Starring: Ayrton Senna; Alain Prost; Frank Williams; Ron Dennis
- Cinematography: Jake Polonsky
- Edited by: Chris King; Gregers Sall
- Music by: Antonio Pinto
- Production companies: StudioCanal; Working Title Films; Midfield Films
- Distributed by: Universal Pictures (Select territories); Océan Films (France)
- Release dates: 7 October 2010 (Suzuka, Mie); 25 May 2011 (France); 3 June 2011 (United Kingdom: limited)
- Running time: 106 minutes
- Countries: United Kingdom; France
- Languages: English; Portuguese; French; Japanese
- Box office: $10.9 million

Senna is a 2010 documentary film that depicts the life and death of Brazilian motor-racing champion Ayrton Senna, directed by Asif Kapadia. The film was produced by StudioCanal, Working Title Films, and Midfield Films, and was distributed by the parent company of the latter two production companies, Universal Pictures.

The film's narrative focuses on Senna's racing career in Formula One, from his debut in the 1984 Brazilian Grand Prix to his death in an accident at the 1994 San Marino Grand Prix, with particular emphasis on his rivalry with fellow driver Alain Prost. Unlike a traditional documentary, it has no formal commentary or retrospective "talking head" interviews, and relies primarily on archival racetrack and broadcast news footage, voiceover narration, and home video clips provided by the Senna family.

Senna was acclaimed by critics. At the 65th British Academy Film Awards, it won two BAFTAs for Best Documentary and Best Editing, and also received a nomination for Outstanding British Film.

== Synopsis ==
The film begins with archival footage of a young Ayrton Senna racing go-karts. In voiceover, the adult Senna wistfully recalls that back then, "there was no money, no politics – it was real racing."

Senna joins Formula One in 1984. After early successes at Toleman and Lotus, briefly noted in the film, the narrative shifts to Senna's rise to World Champion at McLaren. Senna duels with his teammate Alain Prost and struggles with Formula One's top regulator, Jean-Marie Balestre.

Senna wins three Formula One titles in four years. The Senna-Prost rivalry climaxes during the 1989 and 1990 seasons; Senna blames Balestre's rulings for costing him the 1989 title and nearly costing him the 1990 title. In both seasons, controversial collisions between Senna and Prost resolve the title race. In addition, after years of bad luck, Senna survives a gearbox failure to win his home Brazilian Grand Prix in 1991. As a Formula One legend and a Brazilian cultural icon, Senna uses his influence to support driver safety in motorsport and help underprivileged children in Brazil.

During the 1992 season, McLaren's great rival, Williams, develops computer-guided racing equipment that turns Formula One from a championship of drivers into a political struggle to get the best car. Senna wastes two years of his career as Nigel Mansell cruises to the title in 1992 and Alain Prost (now with Williams) easily wins in 1993. Although Senna requests to team up with Prost again in 1993, Prost vetoes Senna from Williams, as he is still furious about their years at McLaren and does not want the extra competition.

Prost retires after 1993 and Senna replaces him at Williams for 1994. Ironically, that same year, Formula One changes its rules to stop Williams from dominating. Without electronic driver aids, Williams struggles to adapt, and the team's performance suffers. The Benetton team's star, Michael Schumacher, wins the first two races of the season. Senna suspects that Benetton is secretly using electronic driver aids but cannot prove it.

The 1994 San Marino Grand Prix is the final weekend of Senna's life. The drivers witness one crash after another, putting Senna under extreme stress. Rubens Barrichello is badly injured on Friday, Roland Ratzenberger is killed on Saturday, and JJ Lehto and Pedro Lamy collide on Sunday. During the race, Senna fatally crashes due to a mechanical failure. The film concludes with the Senna family and his friends and adversaries mourning his loss at his funeral.

An epilogue title card reveals that Formula One has not had a driver fatality since Senna's death. (Note: Jules Bianchi subsequently died of injuries sustained at the 2014 Japanese Grand Prix.) In addition, Senna's family established the Instituto Ayrton Senna to continue his charitable work.

=== Extended edition ===
An extended edition of the film was released in Italy. While the theatrical edition "is made up completely of archive footage," the extended edition includes traditional "talking head" interviews with individuals like Alain Prost, the Guardian's Richard Williams, and ESPN's John Bisignano.

According to one reviewer, while the theatrical edition uses Prost as a narrative villain, the extended edition "paints a much more nuanced picture of the Frenchman" that is "not too unlike Senna" himself, although Prost occasionally demonstrates "selective and convenient memory gaps." The reviewer added that "the theatrical version is more cinematic," but the extended edition "gives more sense of the accomplishments of Senna, and how the man touched lives." Another reviewer commented that the extended edition was not edited in the same style as the theatrical edition, so the additional material "disrupts both the score and the continuity of the original cut."

== Style ==
Unusually for a documentary, "Senna has no talking head interviews and no authoritative commentary." Rather, it is a collage of private home videos, public TV appearances, press conferences and races. Producer Eric Fellner said that the goal was to "feel like Ayrton Senna is telling you the story all the way through."

Kapadia was able to "fashion Senna's story as a live action drama rather than a posthumous documentary." Although the movie was made 25 years after Senna's death, Kapadia was able to tell the story using the abundance of archival footage from Senna's life. Formula One's exploding wealth and popularity in the 1980s and 1990s generated immense media coverage. In addition, Senna's omnipresence on Brazilian and Japanese television provided additional material. Kapadia recalled that by the 1990s, "Ayrton Senna has pretty much got 40 cameras on him everywhere he goes, so it became like cutting a drama. We could literally have a mid shot, a reverse, a two-shot profile and a high-angled helicopter shot if we wanted." With so much material to choose from, Kapadia prioritized events with compelling camera footage, at the cost of omitting some of the most famous moments of Senna's career.

The film was praised for "deliver[ing] an unquestionably cinematic experience", negotiating "a diffuse line between reality and representation." One critic wrote that "like the pop art movement decades prior, Kapadia takes existing elements of mass culture and transforms and recontextualises them."

== Release ==
A special screening of Senna was held on 7 October 2010 at the 2010 Japanese Grand Prix, at the Suzuka Circuit in Suzuka, Japan. The official world première was held at the Cinemark Theatre in São Paulo, Brazil on 3 November 2010. It was released in Brazil on 12 November 2010 and the UK on 3 June 2011.

=== Home media ===
In Japan and Brazil, the film was released on DVD and Blu-ray Disc on 21 and 24 March 2011, respectively. On 11 October it was released onto home media in the UK and was released on 6 March 2012 in the United States.

Two versions of the film were released. The primary version lasts 106 minutes and is widely available. A 162-minute version is only available on Blu-ray releases in certain territories (notably Italy, although a similar special feature appears on the UK version), and includes more interviews and insider information.

A special limited-series box set included a model of Senna's John Player Special Team Lotus car.

== Reception ==
=== Critical response ===
Senna received critical acclaim. On review aggregator website Rotten Tomatoes, the film holds an approval rating of 93% based on 122 reviews, and an average rating of 7.92/10. The website's critical consensus reads, "Even for filmgoers who aren't racing fans, Senna offers heart-pounding thrills -- and heartbreaking emotion." Dan Jolin of Empire gave the film 4 stars out of 5 and stated that it is "ambitiously constructed, deeply compelling, thrilling and in no way only for those who like watching cars drive in circles". Steve Rose, writing in The Guardian, also gave the film a 4 out of 5, and praised the fact that "with so much recorded footage of Formula One available, it has been possible to fashion Senna's story as a live action drama rather than a posthumous documentary. We're not so much hearing what happened in the past as seeing it happen before our eyes."

The New York Times' Stephen Holden praised the film as "a considerable feat of editing" that "virtually puts you in the lap of its subject," but cautioned that because of the density of Formula One history and jargon, viewers unfamiliar with Formula One could still be confused by certain episodes in the narrative, such as the controversy over Williams' electronic driver aids.

=== Formula One response ===
Kapadia sought to condense and stylize Senna's life story, "paring the film down to the bare minimum so that somebody who doesn't like Formula One, or a person who has never heard of Ayrton Senna, will get the film, understand the character, and actually be moved by his story." Certain Formula One figures took issue with this approach. Autosport's Graham Keilloh wrote on his personal blog that the film oversimplified the Senna-Prost rivalry at Prost's expense because it "had to have a coherent Hollywood-style narrative, complete with a protagonist and antagonist." Prost was highly critical of the film's depiction of his relationship with Senna, explaining that the film did not adequately explore the way their relationship changed from rivals to friends after Prost's retirement.

In addition, Julian Jakobi (who was Senna and Prost's manager) explained that the movie understated the role of McLaren engine supplier Honda in fueling the rivalry. Prost was a McLaren man and Senna was a Honda man, and so their battle to succeed inflamed existing factions within the McLaren-Honda relationship.

=== Accolades ===
Award	Category	Recipients and nominees	Outcome
Sundance Film Festival	World Cinema Audience Award: Documentary	—	Won
Los Angeles Film Festival	Audience Award for Best International Feature	—	Won
Melbourne International Film Festival	People's Choice Awards for Best Documentary	—	Won
Adelaide Film Festival.	Audience Award for Best Documentary	—	Won
BAFTA	Outstanding British Film	—	Nominated
BAFTA	Best Documentary	—	Won
BAFTA	Best Editing	Gregers Sall, Chris King	Won
Writers Guild of America	Best Documentary Screenplay	Manish Pandey	Nominated

== See also ==
- Senna (miniseries)
- Prost–Senna rivalry
