= Asif Kapadia =

British film director (born 1972)

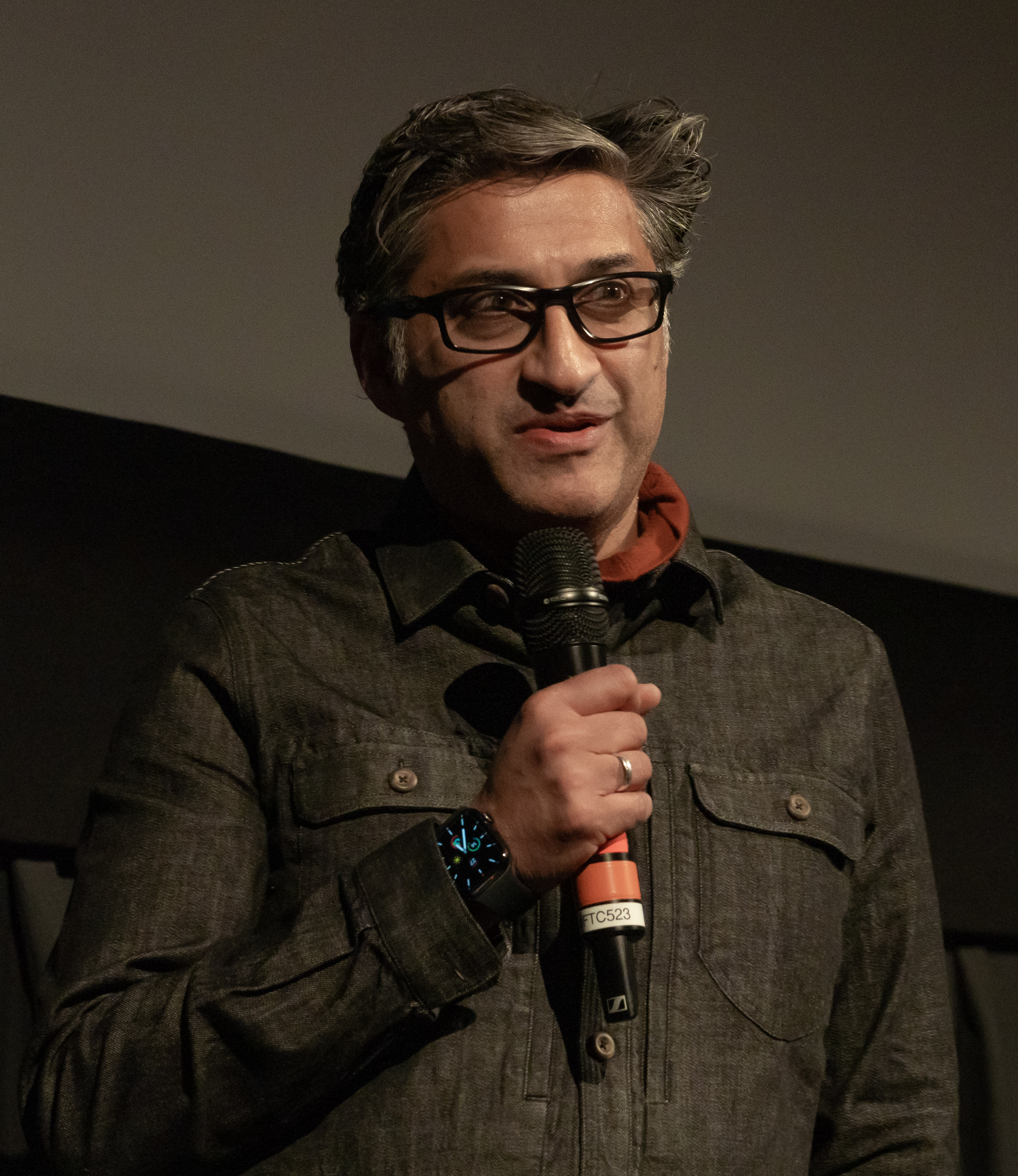
- Kapadia in 2024
- Born: 1972 (age 53–54); London Borough of Hackney, England
- Education: Newport Film School; University of Westminster; Royal College of Art
- Occupation: Filmmaker
- Years active: 1997–present
- Notable work: The Sheep Thief (1997); The Warrior (2001); Senna (2010); Amy (2015); Diego Maradona (2019); 2073 (2024)
- Spouse: Victoria Harwood (m. 2006)
- Website: asifkapadia.com

Asif Kapadia (born 1972) is a British filmmaker. Kapadia is best known for his trilogy of narratively driven, archive-constructed documentaries Senna, Amy, and Diego Maradona.

== Early life and education ==
Asif Kapadia was born in 1972 in north London, to an Indian Muslim family.

He attended Newport Film School (formerly part of the University of Wales, Newport, now the University of South Wales), and achieved a first-class degree (BA Hons) in Film, TV, and Photographic Arts from the University of Westminster, followed by an MA (RCA) in Directing for Film and TV at the Royal College of Art.

Kapadia has said he sees himself as a Londoner ("a Hackney lad"), northern European, with Indian family heritage. These unique characteristics helped to make him stand out as a filmmaker when he was starting out.

I've always tried to do things differently – because my point of view is different. I don't come from private school, I don't come from money. My family were not in the film industry. I'm not white, I'm brown, and my background is Muslim. My family are from India and are quite religious. As the youngest of five kids, my parents kind of let me do what I wanted to do. I was able to have a point of view, I wasn't told, 'You must do this': I picked what I wanted to study, I never did A-levels.

— Asif Kapadia

== Career ==
Kapadia's first feature film, The Warrior, was shot in the Himalayas and the deserts of Rajasthan. The film caught the attention of The Arts Foundation, who in 2001 awarded him a fellowship in film directing. Peter Bradshaw in The Guardian described The Warrior as possessing "mighty breadth" and "shimmering beauty"; the film was nominated for three BAFTA awards, winning two: the Alexander Korda Award for the outstanding British Film of the Year 2003 and The Carl Foreman Award for Special Achievement by a Director, Screenwriter or Producer in their First Feature.

Far North premiered at the Venice Film Festival, based on a dark short story by Sara Maitland. Kapadia used the brutal arctic landscape to show how desperation and loneliness drives a woman to harm the person she loves.

Kapadia's fourth feature, Senna, was the life story of Brazilian motor-racing champion, Ayrton Senna. The film won the BAFTA Award for Best Documentary, the BAFTA Award for Best Editing, and the World Cinema Audience Award Documentary at the 2011 Sundance Film Festival. Senna was nominated for Outstanding British Film of the Year.

Kapadia's next film, Amy, was a documentary that depicted the life and death of British singer-songwriter Amy Winehouse. Amy was released on 3 July 2015 in the UK, New York, and Los Angeles, and worldwide on 10 July. The film has been described as "heartbreaking", "awe-inspiring", "unmissable", "the best documentary of the year" and "a tragic masterpiece". The film received five out of five star ratings when it was reviewed at the 2015 Cannes Film Festival in May. The film has become the highest grossing British documentary, and second highest grossing documentary of all time in the United Kingdom, overtaking Kapadia's 2010 movie Senna.

In 2018, a documentary film titled Maradona, based on Argentine football legend Diego Maradona, was released. Following on from Senna and Amy, Kapadia said: "Maradona is the third part of a trilogy about child geniuses and fame."

In 2019, Kapadia was awarded as Honorary Associate of London Film School.

In May 2021, he released the musical docuseries 1971: The Year That Music Changed Everything, based on the book 1971 – Never a Dull Moment: Rock's Golden Year, by the British music journalist David Hepworth.

In 2024, Kapadia's 2073 was released. The film is a science fiction docudrama set in a dystopian future, exploring the subjects of climate change, corporate fascism, and the global erosion of democracy through the rise of fascism, fictionally depicting a future where these forces are allowed to continue unchecked. Through the creation of the film, Kapadia drew parallels to the Trump administration, stating the following: "Trump has been explicit about getting revenge on people. And now you have some of the richest and most powerful people in the world who became so through the collection of data. They're now in power with someone who said, 'I'm going to be a dictator'. It's like Covid. When it happened in certain parts of the world, people kept thinking, we're immune to it. It's never going to happen. And it came and it rolled its way around the whole globe".

In April 2026, it was announced that ITV had commissioned Kapadia to direct the final instalment in the documentary series Up, following the death of creator and director Michael Apted in 2021. 70 Up aired on ITV on 15 September 2026 and will be aired on SBS Television and SBS on Demand on 7 October 2026.

== Personal life ==
Kapadia met and worked with art director Victoria Harwood on his 1997 film, The Sheep Thief. They married in 2006.

In the early 2000s, Kapadia was subjected to xenophobic practices after a taxi driver reported him to government officials for taking photos of New York City during a trip. As a result, Kapadia was placed on a US Government watch list that required him to undergo extra screening while travelling. In response to the incident, Universal Studios provided Kapadia with a letter verifying his occupation, intended for presentation to government authorities. Kapadia subsequently avoided unnecessary travel to the US for several years.

In September 2019, Kapadia appeared on BBC Radio 4's The Film Programme in which he told presenter Francine Stock of his love for the Vietnamese gangster movie Cyclo by writer-director Trần Anh Hùng. Kapadia saw it when it first came out in 1996, when he was a film student, and it crystallised his ambitions for the type of film-making he wished to pursue. As he explained to Stock, "a lightbulb went off in my head", and his life was never the same again.

=== Favourite films ===
In 2022, Kapadia participated in the Sight & Sound film polls of that year. It is held every ten years to select the greatest films of all time, by asking contemporary directors to select ten films of their choice.

Kapadia's selections were:

- Vertigo (1958)
- Raging Bull (1980)
- 2001: A Space Odyssey (1968)
- La Jetée (1962)
- Once upon a Time in the West (1968)
- Don't Look Now (1973)
- The Godfather Part II (1974)
- Come and See (1985)
- Yojimbo (1961)
- In the Mood for Love (2000)

== Political views ==
In December 2019, along with 42 other leading cultural figures, Kapadia signed a letter endorsing the Labour Party under Jeremy Corbyn's leadership in the 2019 general election.

=== Support for Palestinian causes ===
In 2015, Kapadia signed an open letter in solidarity with the people of Palestine, pledging to boycott professional invitations to Israel and to refuse funding from any institutions linked to its government. In the letter, the boycott drew comparisons to the Artists United Against Apartheid movement, a 1985 collective of artists who protested South African apartheid.

In October 2024, Kapadia shared posts on the social media platform X supporting the Palestinian and Lebanese peoples in reference to the Gaza War. The Grierson Trust deemed some of the posts to be antisemitic, and subsequently removed Kapadia as a patron. Kapadia issued an apology, telling BBC News he was "mortified by the hurt and offence" that some of his posts have caused. Kapadia would go on to state that he is "equally passionate about all anti-racism". The Grierson Trust's treatment of Kapadia led senior Muslim officials in the British television industry to boycott the 2024 Grierson Awards.

In September 2025, Kapadia signed an open pledge with Film Workers for Palestine pledging not to work with Israeli film institutions "that are implicated in genocide and apartheid against the Palestinian people".

== Filmography ==
Year	Title	Director	Producer	Executive Producer	Notes
1994	Indian Tales	Yes			Short film. 12 mins long.
1996	The Waiting Room	Yes			Short film. 8 mins long.
1996	Wild West	Yes			Short film. 1 min long.
1997	The Sheep Thief	Yes			Short film. 24 mins long.
2001	The Warrior	Yes			
2006	The Return	Yes			
2007	Far North	Yes			
2010	Senna	Yes			Released in 2010 in Brazil, 2011 everywhere else
2013	Monsoon Shootout			Yes	
2015	Amy	Yes			Won the 2016 Academy Award for Documentary Feature
2015	Ronaldo			Yes	
2016	Oasis: Supersonic			Yes	
2016	Ali and Nino	Yes			
2017	Mindhunter (TV series)	Yes			Netflix series. Directed episodes 3 & 4.
2019	Diego Maradona	Yes			
2022	Creature	Yes			
2024	Federer: Twelve Final Days	Yes	Yes		
2024	2073	Yes	Yes		Selected in Out of Competition - Non-Fiction at the Venice Film Festival
2025	Kenny Dalglish	Yes	Yes		Documentary, premiere at the Rome Festival
2026	70 Up	Yes	Yes		Final instalment of the long-running Up series of films, looking at a cohort of English children born in 1956.

== Awards and nominations ==
List of awards and nominations
Year	Award / Film Festival	Category	Work	Result	Ref.
2011	British Independent Film Awards	Best British Documentary	Senna	Won	
2011	British Independent Film Awards	Best British Independent Film	Senna	Nominated	
2011	British Independent Film Awards	Best Technical Achievement	Senna	Nominated	
2011	Sundance Film Festival	World Cinema Audience Award: Documentary	Senna	Won	
2011	Satellite Awards	Best Documentary Film	Senna	Won	
2011	Grierson Awards	Best Cinema Documentary	Senna	Nominated	
2011	Los Angeles Film Festival	Audience Award for Best International Feature	Senna	Won	
2011	Melbourne International Film Festival	Most Popular Documentary Award	Senna	Won	
2011	Moscow International Film Festival	Audience Award	Senna	Won	
2011	Adelaide Film Festival	Best Documentary – Audience Award	Senna	Won	
2012	British Academy Film Awards	Best Documentary	Senna	Won	
2012	British Academy Film Awards	Best Editing	Senna	Won	
2012	British Academy Film Awards	Outstanding British Film	Senna	Nominated	
2012	Producers Guild of America Awards	Documentary Feature	Senna	Nominated	
2012	Writers Guild of America Awards	Documentary	Senna	Nominated	
2012	London Film Critics Circle Awards	Documentary of the Year	Senna	Won	
2012	London Film Critics Circle Awards	Technical Achievement	Senna	Nominated	
2012	Evening Standard British Film Awards	Best Documentary	Senna	Won	
2012	Cinema Eye Honors	Outstanding Achievement in Editing	Senna	Won	
2012	Cinema Eye Honors	Outstanding Achievement in non-fiction Feature Filmmaking	Senna	Nominated	
2012	Cinema Eye Honors	Outstanding Achievement in an Original Music Score	Senna	Nominated	
2012	Cinema Eye Honors	Audience Choice Prize	Senna	Nominated	
2012	FOCAL International Awards	Best Use of Footage in a Cinema Release	Senna	Won	
2012	FOCAL International Awards	Best Use of Sports Footage	Senna	Won	
2012	FOCAL International Awards	Special Award for the contribution to Archive Filmmaking Industry	Senna	Won	
2012	FOCAL International Awards	Best Use of Footage in a Home Entertainment Release	Senna	Nominated	
2015	Hollywood Film Awards	Best Documentary of the Year	Amy	Won	
2016	British Academy Film Awards	Best Documentary	Amy	Won	
2016	British Academy Film Awards	Outstanding British Film	Amy	Nominated	
2016	Academy Awards	Best Documentary – Feature	Amy	Won	
