= 2014 in art =

The year 2014 in art involved various significant events.

== Events ==
- A series of annual editathons entitled art + Feminism commences. Held by members of the Wikipedia community, they are undertaken in order to try to level off a gender disparity gap on the subject of the visual arts on the internet reference tool's site.
- January 22 – The value of Canada's leading contemporary art award, the Sobey Art Award, is increased to a total of $100,000.
- February 7 – The British National Gallery in London announces its first ever purchase of a major American painting, George Bellows' Men of the Docks (1912).
- February 12 – The discovery of two new portraits, presumed to depict William Shakespeare, the Wörlitz portrait and the Boaden portrait, is announced by German scholar Hildegard Hammerschmidt-Hummel.
- February 16 – Dominican-born Miami-based artist Maximo Caminero walks into the recently opened Pérez Art Museum Miami in Miami, Florida, and smashes one of twelve vases employed in an installation by the Chinese dissident artist Ai Wei Wei. Caminero later tells the Miami New Times that he destroyed the vase "for all the local artists in Miami that have never been shown in museums here." Miami's museums and galleries, he claims, "have spent so many millions now on international artists," without, in his view, giving any attention to local talent. Later Wei Wei tells The New York Times "The argument does not support the act... It doesn't sound right, his argument doesn’t make much sense. If he really had a point, he should choose another way, because this will bring him trouble to destroy property that does not belong to him." Caminero also tells police that he had been inspired by Wei Wei's own performance piece and triptych Dropping a Han Dynasty Urn.
- April – The organization A Gathering of the Tribes and its founder and longtime executive director Steve Cannon are forced to relocate and its art gallery permanently shut when the occupancy agreement they had with the woman to whom the building had earlier been sold, Lorraine Zhang, ends. Simultaneously, a wall which retained some of an art-piece by David Hammons (which in a prior transaction had been sold to the art collector Dimitris Daskalopoulos after having been reproduced and the originality of the object transferred) is removed and relocated by the organization and replaced by another minus the previously pedigreed adornment.
- April 8 - The website Artspace publishes the article Flipping and the Rise of Zombie Formalism by the art writer and painter Walter Robinson in which he coins the term Zombie Formalism.
- April 26 – The artist Judy Chicago, as part of her retrospective at the Brooklyn Museum and in celebration of her 75th birthday, presents a fireworks display in the New York City borough of Brooklyn's Prospect Park.
- May – A section of We the People by the Vietnamese born Danish artist Danh Vo consisting of pieces of a disassembled replica scale model of the Statue of Liberty in the original sculpture's initial copper sheen is stolen by a thief as the work is laid out in City Hall Park in New York City for installation and then public exhibition.
- May 13 – A painting by Joan Mitchell of a bouquet. Untitled (1960), sells at auction during the post-war and contemporary art auction at Christie's in New York City for $11.9 million U.S., the highest price ever paid at an auction for a work of art by a woman, surpassing the $10.9 million paid for Berthe Morisot's "After Lunch" (1881) the previous year.
- May 18 – The Parrish Art Museum in Southampton, New York reopens in its new building, a 187 meter long facility designed by the Swiss architecture firm of Herzog and de Meuron.
- After May 22 – Politically subversive street art by "Headache Stencil" begins to appear in Bangkok and Chiang Mai, Thailand.
- June 17 – Infrared imagery of Pablo Picasso's 1901 painting The Blue Room reveals another painting beneath the surface.
- June 27 – The Mauritshuis art museum is set to reopen in The Hague, Netherlands following a major renovation.
- July 4 – After having been closed in 2011 for expansion and renovation, the Clark Art Institute in Williamstown, Massachusetts reopens with the estimated $145 million additions of an exhibition and conference center designed by Tadao Ando and a reshaping of its existing galleries by Annabelle Selldorf.
- July 7 – Odalisque in Red Pants by Henri Matisse (which was stolen off the wall at the Contemporary Art Museum of Caracas in the capital city of Venezuela and replaced with a forgery placed inside its former frame and then recovered in an FBI sting operation in Miami, Florida) arrives back in the South American nation after being returned by the United States government.
- August 5 – Blood Swept Lands and Seas of Red, an installation of 888,246 ceramic poppies in the moat of the Tower of London (England) by Paul Cummins with Tom Piper, is unveiled to mark the centenary of the outbreak of World War I, being dismantled after November 11 after around 4 million people have visited.
- August 9 – The Aspen Art Museum in Aspen, Colorado officially reopens to the public in a new structure designed by architect Shigeru Ban.
- September 14 – A Statue of Amy Winehouse, created by Scott Eaton is unveiled at Stables Market, Camden Town in London, to mark the 31st birthday of the singer/songwriter Amy Winehouse (died 2011). Winehouse was heavily associated with Camden Town and the bronze sculpture will remain in this location as an armorial to the star.
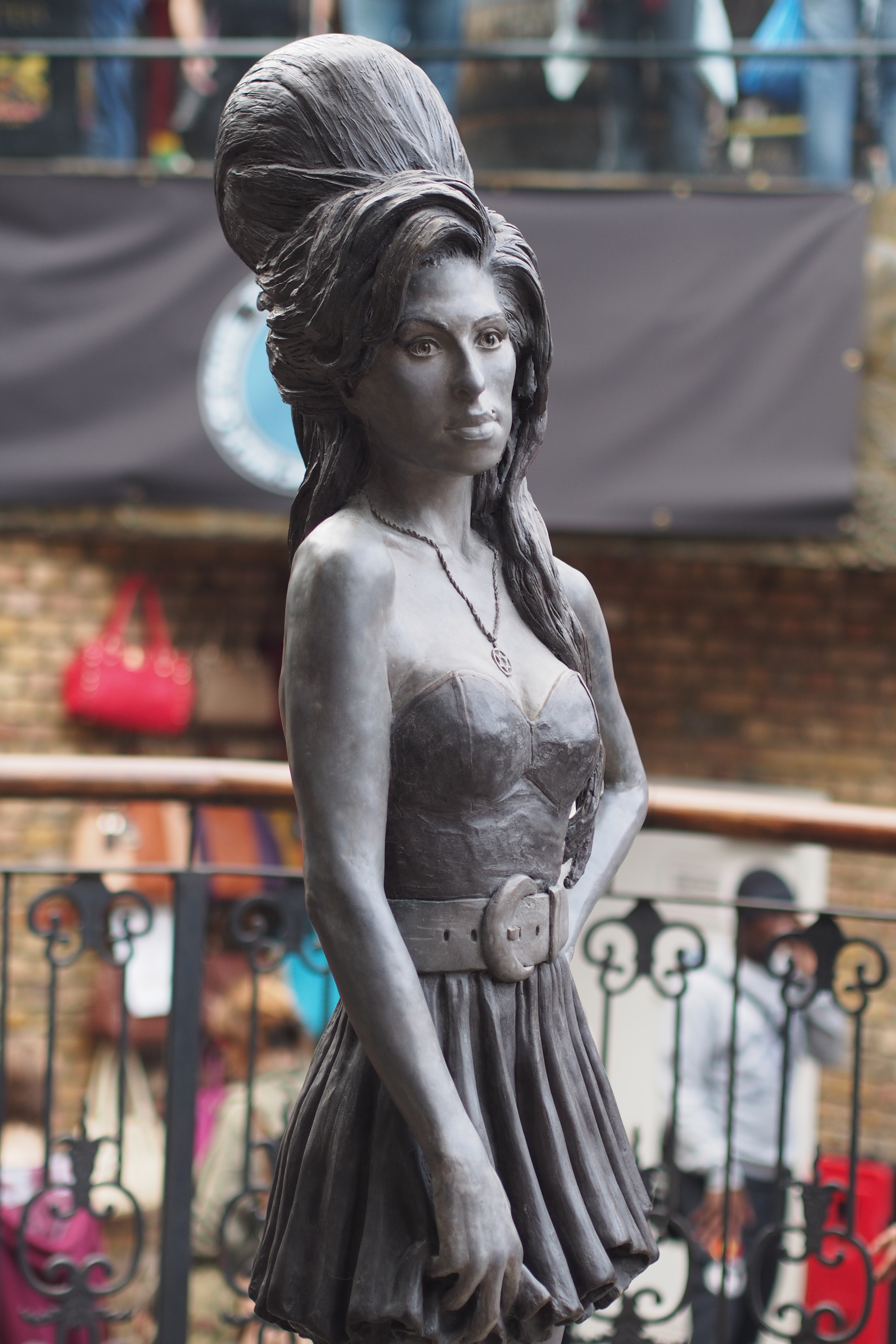
  Bronze statue of Winehouse in Camden Town, London unveiled in September 2014
- November - The statue of Adam by Tullio Lombardo which fell off its pedestal at the Metropolitan Museum of Art in New York City in 2002 is put back on display at the museum after extensive period of repair and restoration said to be the most elaborate costly, and time consuming in the institution's history to date.
- November 16 – The Harvard Art Museums redesigned by Renzo Piano reopen after a six-year hiatus.
- November 19 – The Whitney Museum of American Art says goodbye to their Marcel Breuer Madison Avenue home with a final commissioned work in the form of a Will Pappenheimer Whitney themed digital drug trip piece entitled Proxy, 5-WM2A and the institution's director Adam D. Weinberg announces the opening of their new space by Renzo Piano in Manhattan's meatpacking District adjoining the High Line on May 1, 2015.
- November 20 – A canvas by the American painter Georgia O'Keeffe entitled Jimson Weed/White Flower No.1 (1932) sells for $44.1 million at Sotheby's in New York City, rendering it the highest known price ever paid for a work of art by a female artist and doubling and nearly tripling the $11.9 record previously paid only six months earlier for the Joan Mitchell work Untitled (1960).

== Exhibitions ==
- February 1 – April 28 – "Anglo-American Portraiture in an Era of Revolution" at the Louvre in Paris, France.
- February 12 until April 13 - Pawel Althamer: The Neighbors at the New Museum in New York City.
- February 21 – September 1 – "Italian Futurism, 1909–1944: Reconstructing the Universe" at the Solomon R. Guggenheim Museum in New York City.
- March 7 – May 25 – The Whitney Biennial 2014 at the Whitney Museum of American Art in New York City.
- March 8 – June 7 – "Bjork" (curated by Klaus Biesenbach) at MOMA in New York City .
- March 10 -May 26 – "The Passions of Jean-Baptiste Carpeaux" at the Metropolitan Museum of Art in New York City.
- March 19 – June 15 – "Veronese: Magnificence in Renaissance Venice" at the National Gallery in London.
- April 5 - January 4, 2015 - Ursula von Rydingsvard at the Yorkshire Sculpture Park in West Bretton, West Yorkshire, England.
- June 7 – January 25, 2015 – Franz West at the Williams College Museum of Art in Williamstown, Massachusetts.
- June 27 – October 14 – "Jeff Koons: A Retrospective" at the Whitney Museum of American Art in New York City.
- September 5 - January 4, 2015 - Gustave Courbet: The Swiss Years at the Musée Rath in Geneva, Switzerland.
- September 5 - February 2, 2015 - Francesco Clemente: Inspired by India at the Rubin Museum of Art in New York City.
- September 12 - February 1, 2915 - "From the Margins: Lee Krasner | Norman Lewis, 1945-1952" at the Jewish Museum in New York City.
- October 4 – January 18, 2015 – "Robert Gober: The Heart is not a Metaphor" at MOMA in New York City.
- October 4 - March 8, 2015 - The Divine Marchesa: Art and life of Luisa Casati from the Belle Époque to the Spree Years at the Palazzo Fortuny in Venice.
- October 10 – January 7, 2015 – "Zero: Countdown to Tomorrow, 1950s–60s at the Solomon R. Guggenheim Museum in New York City.
- October 12 – February 1, 2015 – "Café Dolly: Picabia, Schnabel, Willumsen at the Museum of Art Fort Lauderdale.
- October 17 – December 21 – "Walter Robinson: Paintings and Other Indulgences at the university Galleries of Illinois State University in Normal, Illinois (curated by Barry Blinderman).
- October 20 – February 16, 2015 – "Cubism: The Leonard A.Lauder Collection at the Metropolitan Museum of Art in New York City.
- October 29 – February 1, 2015 (extended until February 11, 2015) – "Chris Ofili: Night and Day " at the New Museum in New York City.
- December 3 – May 3, 2015 – "One Way: Peter Marino" at the Bass Museum in Miami Beach, Florida.

== Works ==
- Chris Burden - Light of Reason permanently installed outside the Rose Art Museum st Brandeis University in Waltham, Massachusetts.
- Mark Chatterly – Blue Human Condition in Adrian, Michigan.
- Alex Chinneck – A Pound of Flesh for 50p, London.
- Peter Darvington, Boy Kong, Taylor McKimens, Tom Sanford and others – The Audubon Mural Project inspired by John James Audubon's The Birds of America watercolors of 314 North American birds endangered by global warming developments partially commissioned by Sugar Hill Capital Partners (in order to raise awareness of the Audubon Society's campaign to save them) in Harlem, New York City (ongoing).
- Ed Dwight – Denmark Vesey Monument, Charleston, South Carolina.
- Andy Edwards – Statue of Frederick Douglass.
- David Hockney – 4 Blue Stools.
- Ellsworth Kelly - Spectrum Vlll at the Louis Vuitton Foundation in Paris.
- Markus Lüpertz – Beethoven (sculptural monument) installed at the Stadtgarten in Bonn, Germany.
- Tony Matelli – "Sleepwalker".
- Jaume Plensa - The Secret Heart
- Josephine Pryde – The New Media Express in a Temporary Siding (Baby Wants To Ride) (installation).
- Richard Serra - East-West/West-East in Qatar.
- Jonas Stirner - Grounded at Grounds for Sculpture in Hamilton Township, New Jersey.[
- Emma Sulkowicz – Mattress Performance (Carry That Weight) begins in September at Columbia University in New York City.
- Kara Walker – "A Subtlety" or "The Marvelous Sugar Baby" at the former Domino Sugar Refinery in Brooklyn, New York.
- Ken Washington – Statue of Martin Luther King Jr., in MacGregor Park, Houston, Texas.
- Jack Whitten - Atopolis: For Édouard Glissant.
- Jordan Wolfson – Female Figure.

== Awards ==
- The Archibald Prize – Fiona Lowry for "Penelope Seidler"
- The John Moores Painting Prize – Rose Wylie for "PV Windows and Floorboards"

== Films ==
- All-Round Appraiser Q: The Eyes of Mona Lisa
- Big Eyes
- Effie Gray
- The Monuments Men

== Deaths ==
- January 2 – R. Crosby Kemper Jr., 86, American banker, art collector and founder of the Kemper Museum of Contemporary Art
- January 8 – Madeline Gins, 72, American artist, architect and poet.
- January 13 – Gary Grimshaw, 67, American graphic rock concert poster artist.
- January 16 – Douglas Davis, 80, American art critic and artist
- January 25 – Morrie Turner, 90, American cartoonist (Wee Pals)
- January 28
  - Frédéric Bruly Bouabré, 91, Ivorian artist
  - Fernand Leduc, 97, Canadian abstract painter
- February 1 – René Ricard, 67, American poet, artist and art critic
- February 2 – J. D. 'Okhai Ojeikere, 83, Nigerian photographer
- February 3 – Joan Mondale, 83, American visual arts advocate and Second Lady of the United States (1977–1981)
- February 8
  - Terry Adkins, 60, American conceptual artist
  - Nancy Holt, 75, American land artist
- February 10 – Olga Jevrić, 91, Serbian sculptor
- February 13 – Rose Finn-Kelcey, 68, English performance and installation artist
- February 14 – Patrick Scott, 93, Irish artist
- February 15 – Roy Oxlade, 85, English painter and critic
- February 23 – Carla Accardi, 89, Italian painter
- February 24 – Carlos Páez Vilaró, 90, Uruguayan artist
- February 25 – Martin E. Sullivan, 70, American museum director (National Portrait Gallery and Heard Museum)
- February 26 – Sorel Etrog, 80, Canadian sculptor
- February 27 – Jan Hoet, 77, Belgian art critic and curator
- February 28 – Gib Singleton, 78, American sculptor
- March 4
  - Barrie Cooke, 83, English-born Irish artist
  - Stass Paraskos, 80, Greek Cypriot painter
- March 16 – Markus Brüderlin, 55, Swiss art historian and curator
- March 18 – Ara Shiraz, 72, Armenian sculptor and architect
- March 27 – Gina Pellón, 87, expatriate Cuban painter living in France
- March 30 – Lyman Kipp, 84, American sculptor
- April 5 – Alan Davie, 93, British painter
- April 6 – Leee Black Childers, 68, American punk rock and art photographer
- April 7 – George Dureau, 83, American painter and photographer
- May 6
  - Cornelius Gurlitt, 81, German art collector implicated in 2012 Munich artworks discovery
  - Maria Lassnig, 94, Austrian artist
- May 7
  - David Prentice, 77, English painter
  - Elaine Sturtevant, 84, American pop and minimalist artist
- May 10 – Patrick Woodroffe, 73, English painter and illustrator
- May 12 – H. R. Giger, 74, Swiss Academy Award-winning surrealist artist
- May 20 – Robyn Denny, 83, British abstract painter
- May 27 – Massimo Vignelli, 83, Italian graphic designer (New York City Subway map, American Airlines)
- June 6 – Eric Hill, 86, English-American author and illustrator
- June 9 – Kim Heungsou, 94, Korean painter
- June 14 – Ultra Violet, 78, French-American artist
- June 17 – Stanley Marsh 3, 76, American artist and philanthropist, patron of Cadillac Ranch
- June 22 – Jennifer Wynne Reeves, 51, American painter
- July 10 – On Kawara, 81, Japanese-born American conceptual artist
- July 12 – Nestor Basterretxea, 90, Spanish Basque artist
- July 17 – Otto Piene, 86, German artist
- July 20 – Constantin Lucaci, 91, Romanian sculptor
- July 25 – Richard Larter, 85, English-born Australian pop artist.
- July 27 – Sam Hunter, 91 American Art historian
- July 30 – Harun Farocki, 70, German filmmaker whose work was included in the Carnegie International and Documenta
- July 31 – King Robbo, English underground graffiti artist
- August 5 – Edward Leffingwell, 72, American art critic, curator
- August 17 – Ger van Elk, 73, Dutch artist
- August 20 – Sava Stojkov, 89, Serbian painter
- August 22 – Jean Sutherland Boggs, 92, Canadian first female museum director of the National Gallery of Canada (1966-1976) and director of the Philadelphia Museum of Art (1978-1982)
- August 27 – Marjorie Strider, 83, American painter and sculptor
- September 29 – Luis Nishizawa, 96, Mexican painter
- October 26 – David Armstrong, 60, American photographer
- November 8 – Hannes Hegen, 89, German illustrator and cartoonist
- November 15 – Jack Bridger Chalker, 96, English painter and academic
- November 23 – Lewis Baltz, 69, American visual artist and photographer
- November 27 – Wynn Chamberlain, 87, American artist, filmmaker and author
- December 6 – Renato Mambor, 78, Italian painter
- December 9 – Jane Freilicher, 90, American painter
- December 21 – Jane Bown, 89, English portrait photographer
- December 30 – Jake Berthot, 75, American painter
