= Amy Winehouse in popular culture =

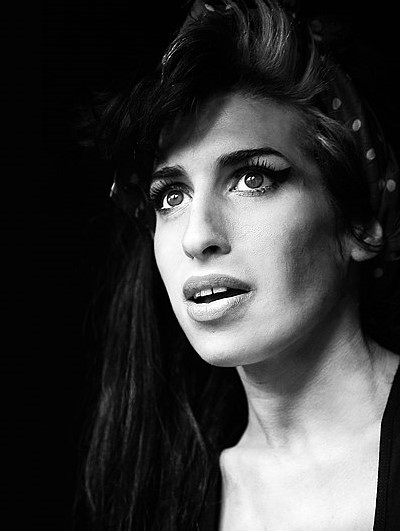
Winehouse in 2008

English singer and songwriter Amy Winehouse (1983–2011) has been depicted in several works of film, television, and the arts.

The critically acclaimed and commercially successful albums Frank (2003) and Back to Black (2006), and accompanying live performances, have been influential to other artists such as Adele and Duffy, who credit Winehouse as a foundation for their success. Her beehive hairstyle and fashion has been depicted in several pieces of art, including a Madame Tussauds waxwork and a bronze statue, while her complex personal life has also been represented in art and film.

== Art ==
London's Mall Galleries opened an exhibition in May 2008 that included a sculpture of Winehouse, titled Excess. The piece, created by Guy Portelli, had a miniature of the singer lying on top of a cracked champagne bottle, with a pool of spilled liquid underneath. The body was covered with what appeared to be tiny pills, while one outstretched hand held a glass. Another piece, a print titled Celebrity 1 by artist Charlotte Suckling, was shown in the same exhibition.

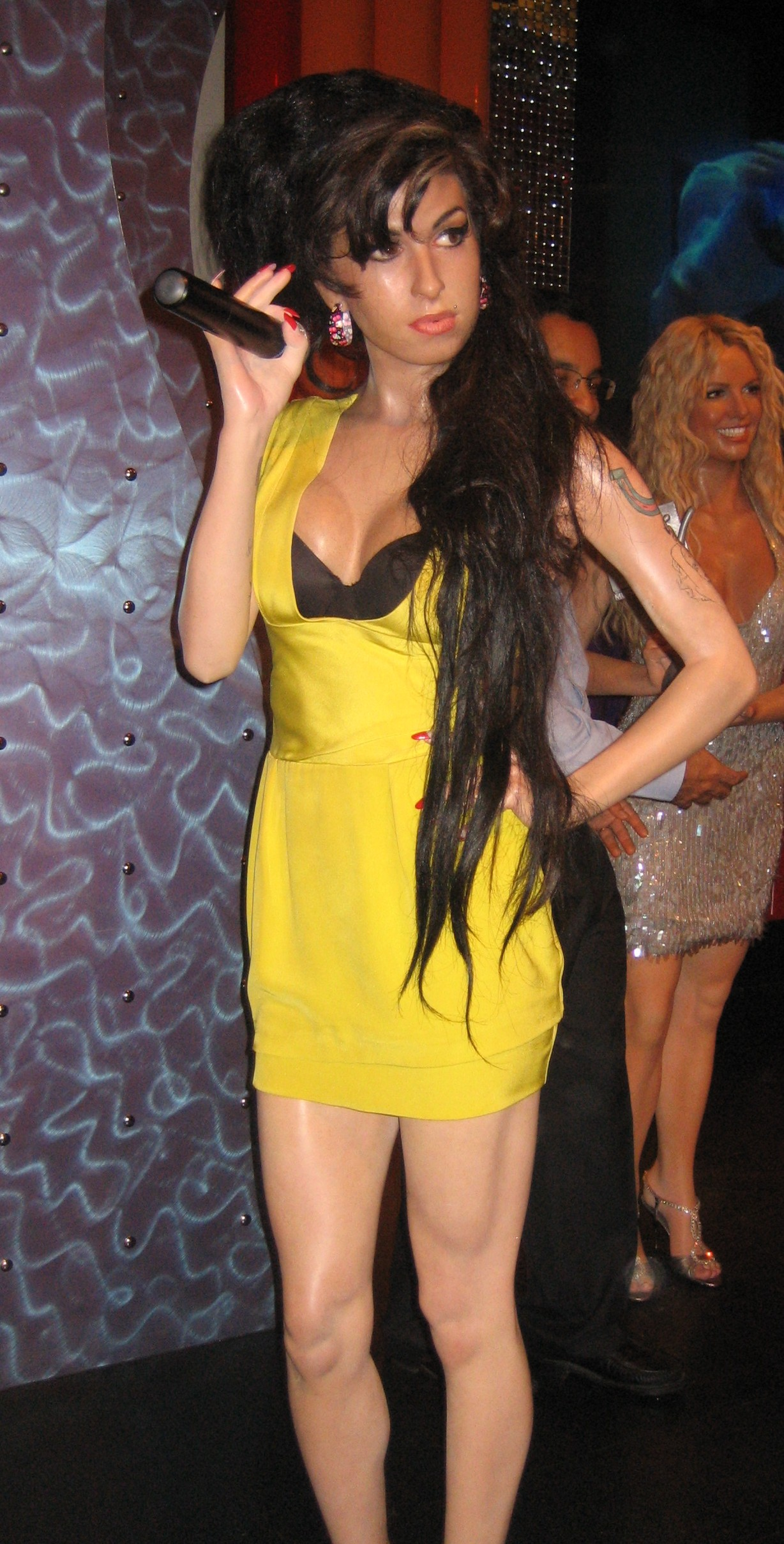
Wax figure of Winehouse at Madame Tussauds in London

Winehouse was immortalised at the world-famous London Madame Tussauds on 23 July 2008. Winehouse herself had expressed surprise at plans to make a waxwork of her, stating that she believed a person 'had to be dead' before a waxwork was made of them. Winehouse did not make herself available for sittings for the Madame Tussauds waxwork, which was instead done from photos.

A sculpture by Marco Perego, titled The Only Good Rock Star Is a Dead Rock Star, that depicts Winehouse lying in a pool of blood with an apple and a bullet hole in her head after being shot by American novelist and Beat poet William S. Burroughs (in a recreation of the accidental killing of his wife Joan Vollmer), went on display in New York's Half Gallery on 14 November 2008 with a sale price of US$100,000. Perego said of the sculpture: "Rock stars are the sacrificial animals of society." Winehouse was not supportive of Peregro's work, with her spokesperson stating: "It's a funny kind of tribute. The artist seems in thrall to a tabloid persona that is not the real Amy. People often use her image to sell their work."

In 2012, Winehouse was among the British cultural icons selected by artist Sir Peter Blake to appear in a new version of his most famous artwork – the Beatles' Sgt. Pepper's Lonely Hearts Club Band album cover – to celebrate the British cultural figures of his life that he most admires.

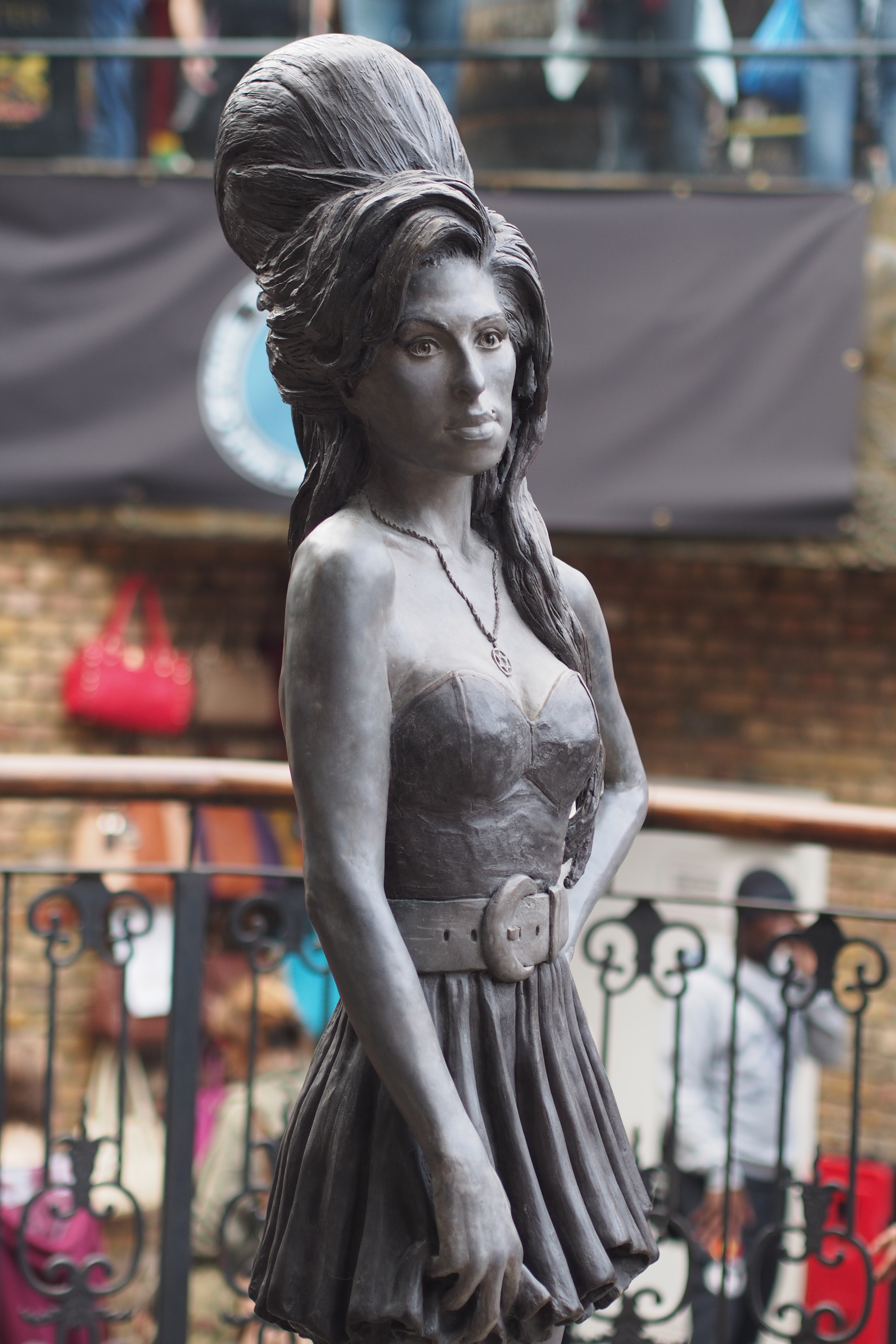
Bronze statue of Winehouse in Camden Town, London, unveiled in September 2014

On 14 September 2014 (which would have been Winehouse's 31st birthday), a statue of her by sculptor Scott Eaton was unveiled at Stables Market in Camden Town, North London. Fans and relatives gathered for the unveiling in Camden's Stable Market. London-based Eaton, who sculpted the piece after being introduced to Winehouse's father Mitch, said the statue was meant to capture her "attitude and strength, but also give subtle hints of insecurity." Her father Mitch said of the statue: "Now Amy will oversee the comings and goings of her home town forever... Amy was in love with Camden and it is the place her fans from all over the world associate her with."

An exhibit of Winehouse's personal items, co-curated by her brother and sister-in-law, titled Amy Winehouse: A Family Portrait, was on display at the Jewish Museum London from 3 July 2013 until 15 September 2013, and later exhibited in San Francisco, 23 July 2015 to 1 November 2015. Display items, such as books and music, were featured together with captions written by Winehouse's brother.

In 2018, the artist Dan Llywelyn Hall's portrait of the singer, Amy's Glance, was exhibited at the London Art Fair.

In January 2020, an exhibition titled Beyond Black – The Style of Amy Winehouse opened at the Grammy Museum in Los Angeles. The exhibit mainly focused on Winehouse's style and fashion, displaying outfits such as her iconic dresses, shoes, hair accessories, makeup bag as well as Winehouse's personal belongings including her Grammy awards from 2008, handwritten lyrics, records and unseen home videos. The exhibition went on display in the U.S. from 17 January 2020 until 13 April 2020. In March 2020, Winehouse's name on a stone was unveiled on the new Music Walk of Fame in Camden, with her parents Mitch and Janis in attendance at the ceremony.

The exhibition Amy: Beyond the Stage opened on 26 November 2021 until 10 April 2022 at the Design Museum in Kensington, London which also presented some of Winehouse's personal belongings and focus on her fashion sense, as well as paying homage to her musical career. Also in November 2021, various of Winehouse's personal items and famous dresses would later be auctioned at Julien's Auctions in Los Angeles and made more than £3m, 30% going to the Amy Winehouse Foundation.

== Film ==
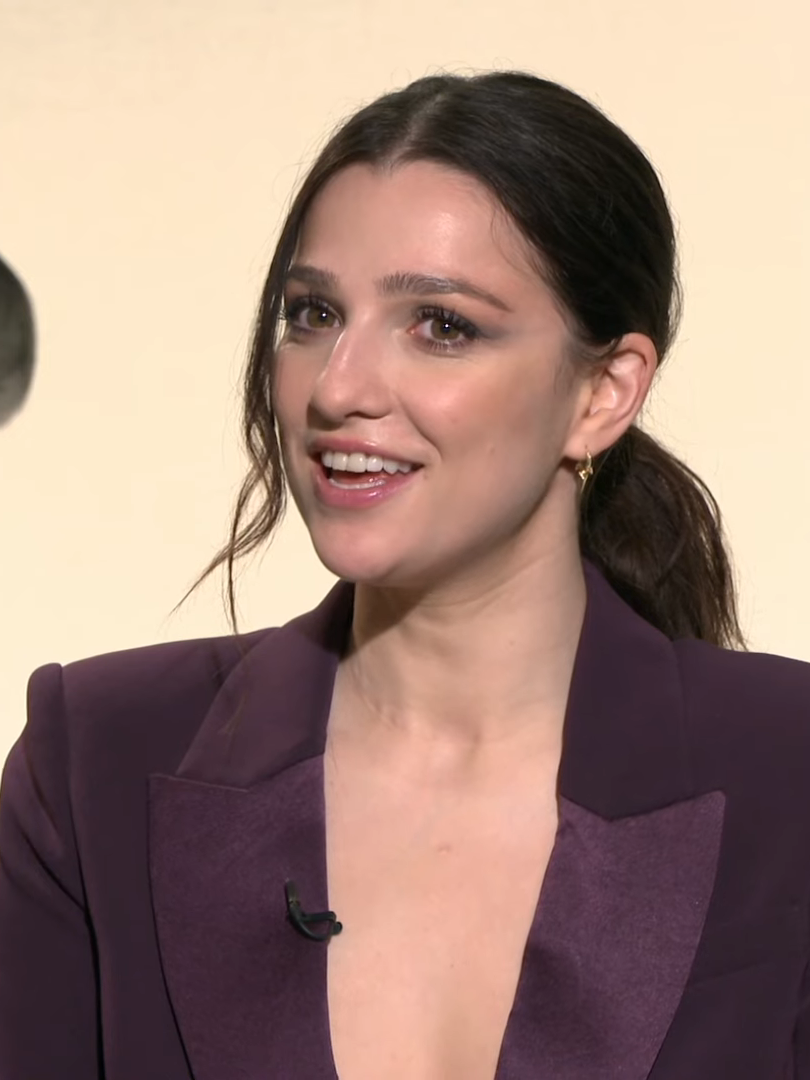
British actress Marisa Abela plays Winehouse in the biopic Back to Black, which released in 2024 to mixed reviews.

In late 2011, there were reports that Winehouse's former boyfriend, Reg Traviss, was developing a film about her. Winehouse's father Mitch Winehouse, who owns the copyright to his daughter's music, said he would not authorise the use of her music for the film.

A documentary film, Amy (2015), directed by Asif Kapadia and produced by James Gay-Rees, was released on 3 July 2015. The film covers Winehouse's life, her relationships, her struggles with substance abuse both before and after her career blossomed, and which eventually caused her death. The film received its première at the 2015 Cannes Film Festival on 16 May and has been reviewed as "a tragic masterpiece", "brilliant", "heartbreaking" and "unmissable". The soundtrack of the same name was released on 30 October 2015, along with the DVD that includes music featured in the documentary by film composer Antônio Pinto and classic and some unreleased tracks by Winehouse. The film was highly acclaimed and received various accolades, including the Academy Award for Best Documentary Feature at the 2016 Oscars, Best Music Film at the 2016 Grammy Awards, the BAFTA for Best Documentary, the MTV Movie Award for Best Documentary, in addition to a nomination for the BAFTA Award for Best British Film.

As the years passed since her death, talk began to grow of a film biopic of Amy Winehouse's life. In October 2018, it was announced that Winehouse's estate had signed a multi-million pound deal to make a film biopic about her life and career. In August 2021 it was reported that a film based on Daphne Barak's 2010 book, Saving Amy, which chronicles the late singer's final years, had been greenlighted by Halcyon Studios. However, in September 2021, Amy's father and estate executor, Mitch, stated that was "100% not allowed."

In July 2022, it was reported that a feature film biopic, entitled Back To Black (2024) was to be produced by StudioCanal UK, distributed by Focus Features and directed by Sam Taylor-Johnson—who previously made a biopic of The Beatles star John Lennon, Nowhere Boy (2009)—and directed Fifty Shades of Grey (2015). The script was written by Matt Greenhalgh and it was to be made with the full cooperation of Amy's father Mitch, and her estate. In January 2023, it was revealed that British actress Marisa Abela would play the leading role of Winehouse and filming commenced later that month in London. In January 2024, a trailer for Back to Black was released along with a debut release date of 12 April in the UK. The film was moderately successful at the box office, with a worldwide total of $51.1 million. The film attracted mixed reviews, with praise for the acting but criticism for a selective depiction of Winehouse's life, including the complete omission of Reg Traviss, and over-sympathetic depictions of Mitch Winehouse and Blake Fielder-Civil.

== Music ==
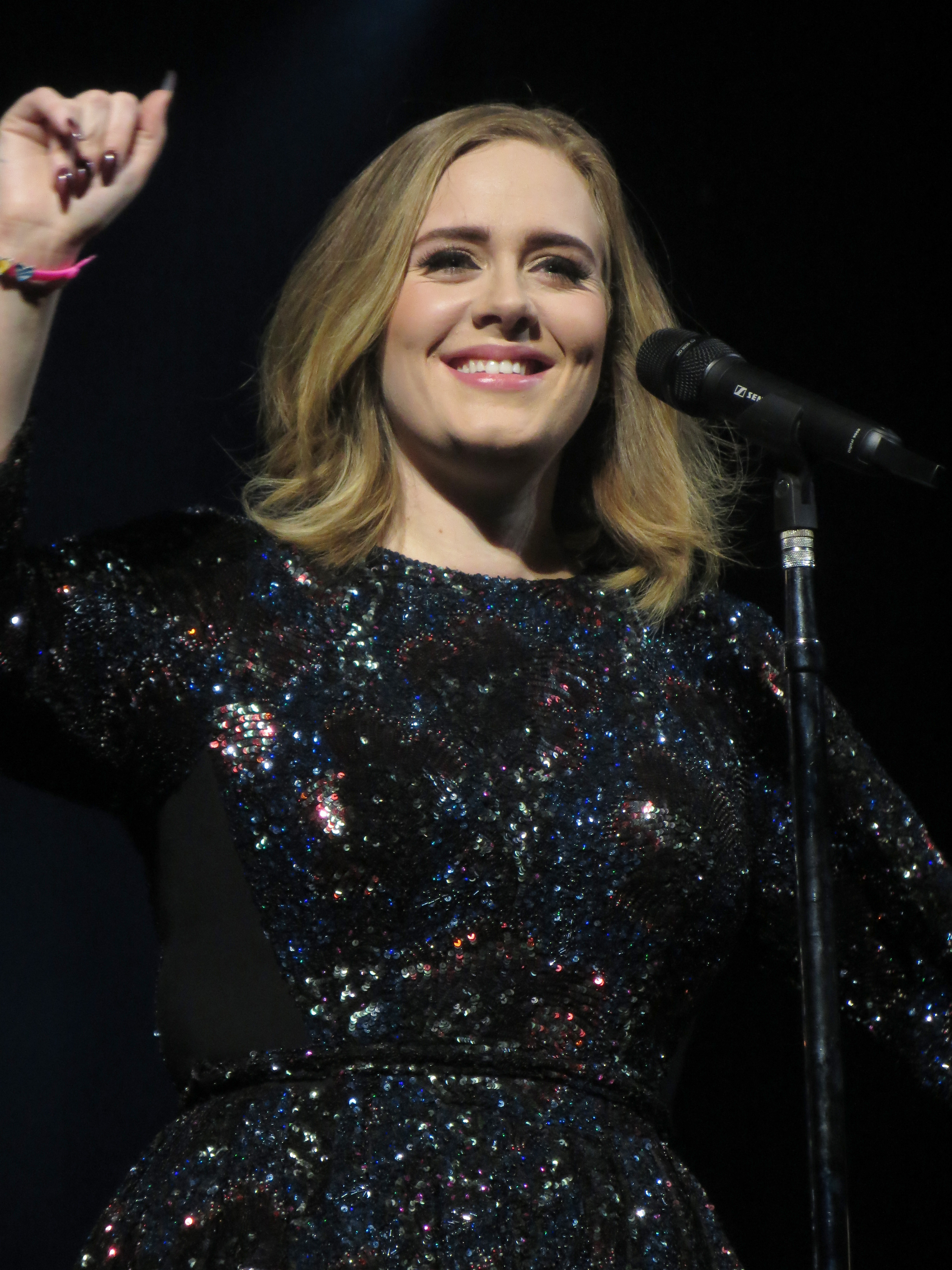
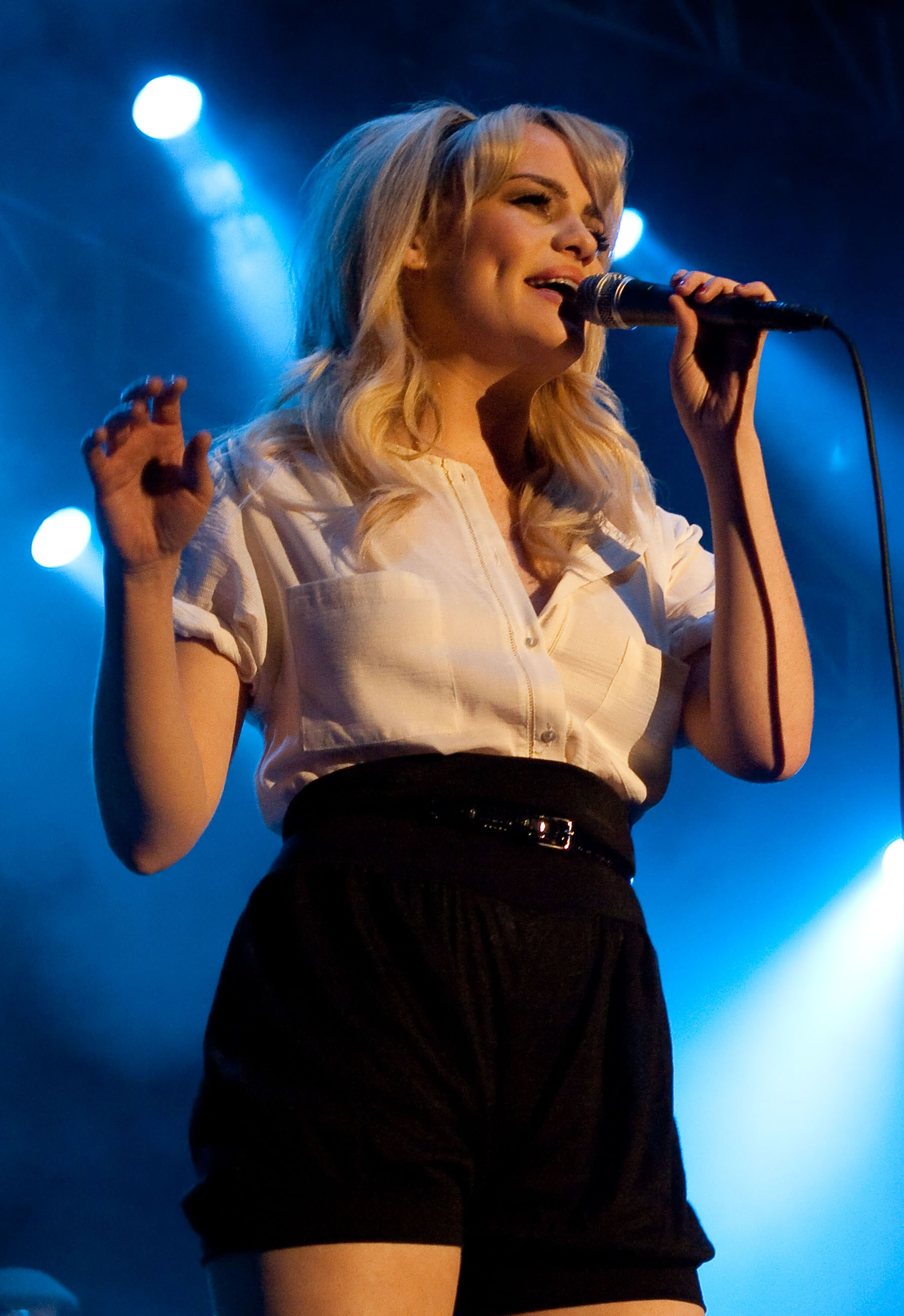
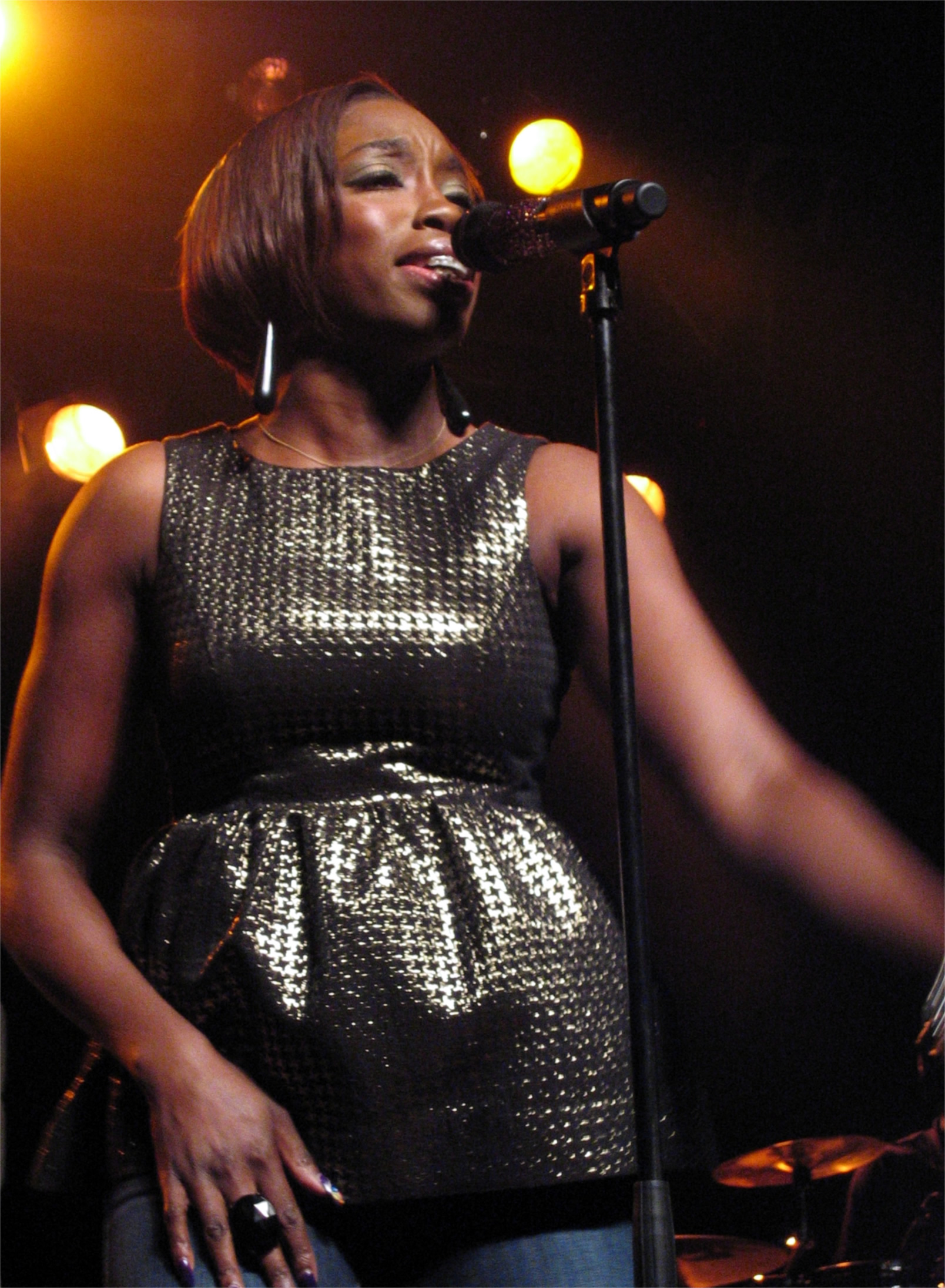
Winehouse helped popularise the female British soul wave in the late 2000s, paving the way for prominent artists such as Adele, Duffy, and Estelle.

Adele has credited Winehouse's success in making her and Welsh singer Duffy's journey to the United States "a bit smoother." Lady Gaga credited Winehouse with paving the way for her rise to the top of the charts, explaining that Winehouse made it easier for unconventional women to have mainstream pop success. Raphael Saadiq, Anthony Hamilton and John Legend said she "was produced by people who wanted to create a marketing coup. The positive side is that it reacquainted an audience with this music and played an introductory role for others. This reinvigorated the genre by overcoming the vintage aspect." Other artists that have credited Winehouse as an influence or for paving the way for them include Bruno Mars, Tove Lo, Jessie J, Emeli Sandé, Victoria Justice, Paloma Faith, Lana Del Rey, Jess Glynne, Sam Smith, Florence Welch, Halsey, Ariana Grande, Alessia Cara, Estelle, Daya, Raye, Jorja Smith, Lauren Jauregui, Olivia Dean, Sienna Spiro, and Billie Eilish.

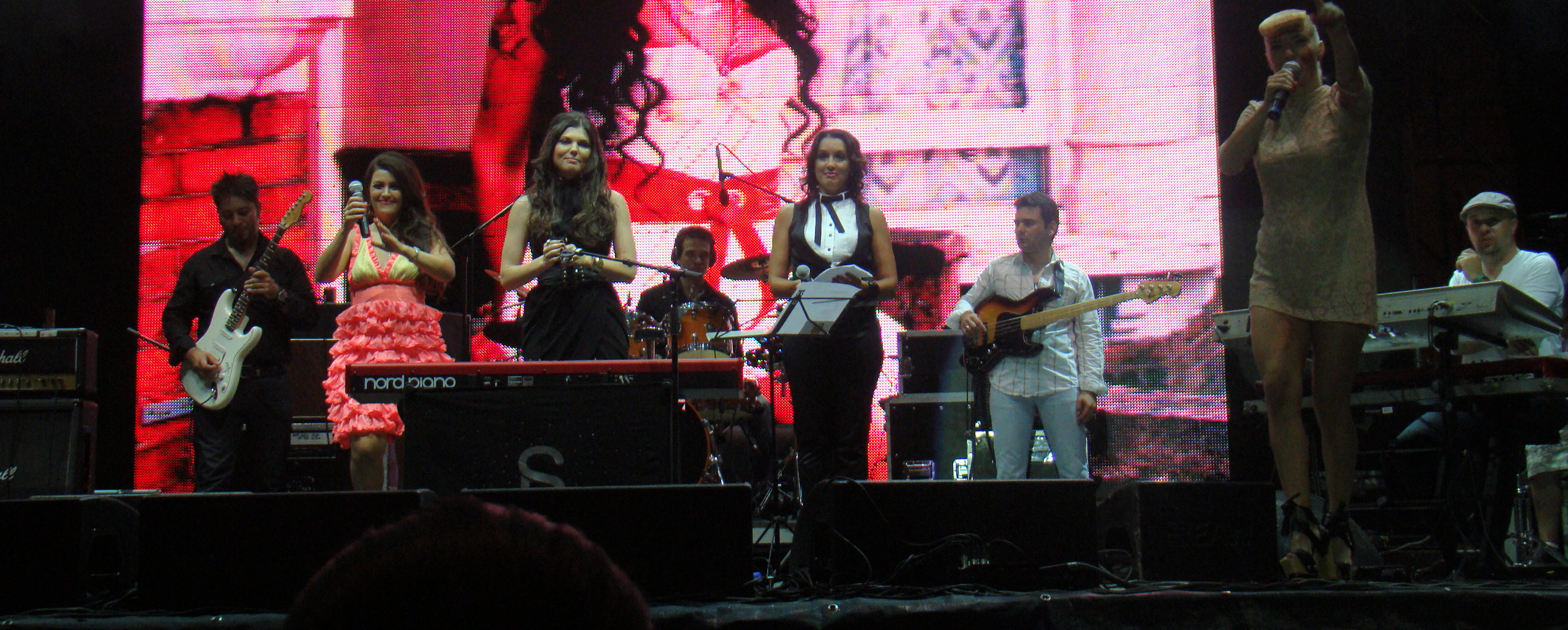
Romanian singers Rona Hartner, Paula Seling, Nico and Maria Radu performing at a memorial Amy Winehouse concert in Bucharest on 23 October 2011

Many musical artists have since paid tribute to Winehouse including Nicki Minaj, M.I.A., Lady Gaga, Kelly Osbourne, Rihanna, George Michael, Adele, Dita Von Teese, Courtney Love, and the rock band Green Day, who wrote a song in her tribute titled "Amy". In her 2012 album Banga, singer Patti Smith released "This Is the Girl", written as an homage to Winehouse. Mark Ronson dedicated his UK number-one album Uptown Special to Winehouse, stating: "I'm always thinking of you and inspired by you." In February 2019, Salaam Remi released a compilation album including the song "Find My Love" which is a posthumous collaboration between Winehouse and rapper Nas.

After the release of Back to Black, record companies sought out female artists with a similar sound and fearless and experimental female musicians in general. Adele and Duffy were the second wave of artists with a sound similar to Winehouse's. A third wave of female musicians that has emerged since the album was released are led by V V Brown, Florence and the Machine, La Roux and Little Boots. In March 2011, the New York Daily News ran an article attributing the continuing wave of British female artists that have been successful in the United States to Winehouse and her absence. Spin magazine music editor Charles Aaron was quoted as saying "Amy Winehouse was the Nirvana moment for all these women," "They can all be traced back to her in terms of attitude, musical styles or fashion." According to Keith Caulfield, chart manager for Billboard, "Because of Amy, or the lack thereof, the marketplace was able to get singers like Adele, Estelle and Duffy," "Now those ladies have brought on the new ones, like Eliza Doolittle, Rumer and Ellie."

In 2025, Back to Black was preserved in the National Recording Registry by the Library of Congress as being "culturally, historically, or aesthetically significant".

On 21 October 2026, Amy Winehouse: Back to Black at 20, a commemorative concert celebrating the album, took place at Camden Town's Roundhouse. Curated by the album's producers Mark Ronson and Salaam Remi, the event featured The Amy Winehouse Band performing the album in full, accompanied by guest vocalists including Corinne Bailey Rae, Sasha Keable, Nia Smith, Skye Newman, Yebba, Terri Walker, Lianne La Havas, Baby Rose, Jorja Smith, FLO and Jessie Reyez. The concert was subsequently aired on BBC Two and BBC iPlayer on 24 October and broadcast on BBC Radio 2 on 26 October.

== Stage ==
On 9 October 2017, it was announced by Winehouse's father Mitch that a West End/Broadway musical on Amy is in the works. Mitch Winehouse revealed the news at the Amy Winehouse Foundation Gala event in London.

== Television ==
In 2018, a television documentary based on Winehouse's album Back to Black, Amy Winehouse: Back to Black, was released. It contains new interviews as well as archival footage. It was made by Eagle Vision and produced by Gil Cang. Released on DVD on 2 November 2018, the film features interviews by producers Ronson & Remi, who worked half and half on the album, along with the Dap Kings, Remi's music team, Ronnie Spector from the Ronettes and close ones to Winehouse, including Nick Shymansky, Juliette Ashby and Dionne Bromfield. The film is accompanied by An Intimate Evening in London, footage of a show Winehouse gave at Riverside Studios, London in 2008.

On 23 July 2021, a documentary titled Reclaiming Amy aired on BBC Two to mark the 10th anniversary of Winehouse's death. The film was primarily based on the perspective and narrated by her mother Janis Winehouse-Collins and included intimate stories of those who were close to Winehouse until the end of her life, including close friends Naomi Parry (Winehouse's stylist), Catriona Gourlay and Chantelle Dusette.

== Writing ==
Winehouse's parents have each written memoirs about their daughter and donated the proceeds from both books to the Amy Winehouse Foundation. In the introduction to Mitch Winehouse's biography, titled Amy: My Daughter (2012), he explained: "Apart from being her father, I was also her friend, confidant and adviser—not that she always took my advice, but she always heard me out." Her mother Janis published Loving Amy: A Mother's Story, in 2014.
