= Brüderlin =

Brüderlin or Bruderlin is a surname. Notable people with the surname include:

- Craig Kenneth Bruderlin (born 1940), a.k.a. James Brolin, American actor
- Markus Brüderlin (1958–2014), Swiss art historian, curator, and writer
- Willy Brüderlin (1894-?), Swiss rower
