= Martin Sullivan =

Martin Sullivan may refer to:

- Marty Sullivan (1862–1894), Major League Baseball outfielder
- Martin Sullivan (priest) (1910–1980), Anglican Dean of St Paul's
- Martin E. Sullivan (1944–2014), National Portrait Gallery director and former chairman of the U.S. President's Advisory Committee on Cultural Property
- Martin J. Sullivan (born 1955), former CEO of American International Group
