= Scott Eaton =

Scott Eaton or Scot Eaton may refer to:

- Scot Eaton, comic book artist, best known for his work on Friendly Neighborhood Spider-Man, X-Men: Endangered Species, and X-Men: Messiah Complex
- Scott Eaton (American football) (born 1944), former American football defensive back in the National Football League
- Scott Eaton (artist) (born 1973, Washington), American artist, designer and photographer

== See also ==
- Scott Elarton, retired right-handed pitcher
