= From the Knees of my Nose to the Belly of my Toes =

Public art installation in Cliftonville, Margate from 2013 to 2014

Coordinates: 51.39035°N 1.39737°E

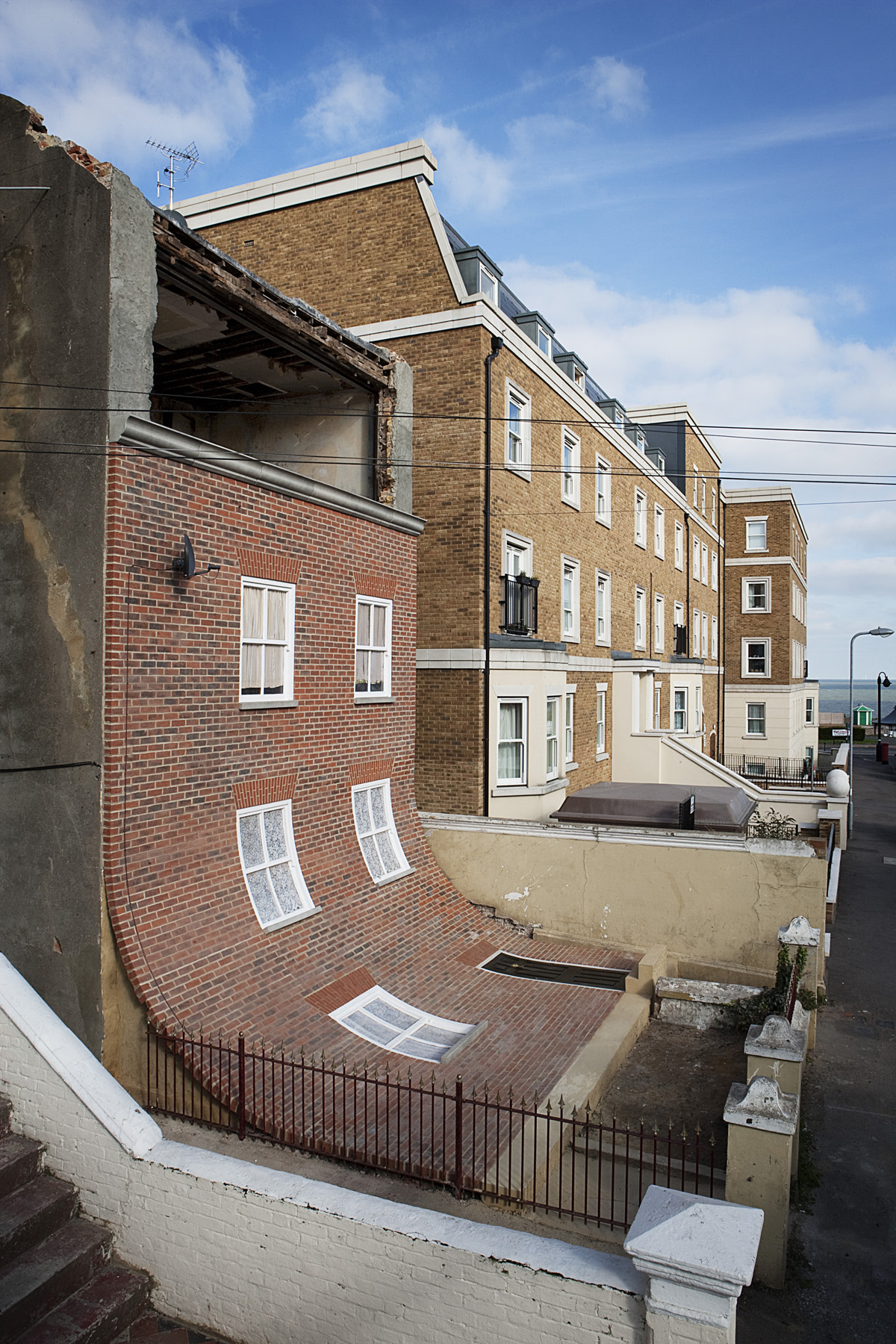
From the knees of my nose to the belly of my toes

From the Knees of my Nose to the Belly of my Toes was a sculpture and public art installation by the artist Alex Chinneck that existed in Cliftonville, Margate, from 2013 to 2014. The house was vacant for eleven years prior to Chinneck's project, and was subsequently restored as housing. The installation created the appearance that the building's facade had slipped down and was built at a cost of £100,000 with materials donated by British industry members who collaborated on the project.
