= Blue Human Condition =

Sculpture

- Artist: Mark Chatterley
- Year: 2014
- Type: Sculpture
- Location: Adrian, Michigan, United States; 41°53′59.5″N 84°02′13.7″W

Blue Human Condition, also known as The Orgy Statue, is an outdoor sculpture by Mark Chatterley, located in Adrian, Michigan, in the United States. The city-approved sculpture was revealed in April 2014 near Adrian City Hall. Immediately following its unveiling, residents expressed concern over the sculpture. It was relocated to a less visible area of a park.

== See also ==
- 2014 in art
