= A Pound of Flesh for 50p =

2014 temporary outdoor sculpture in London

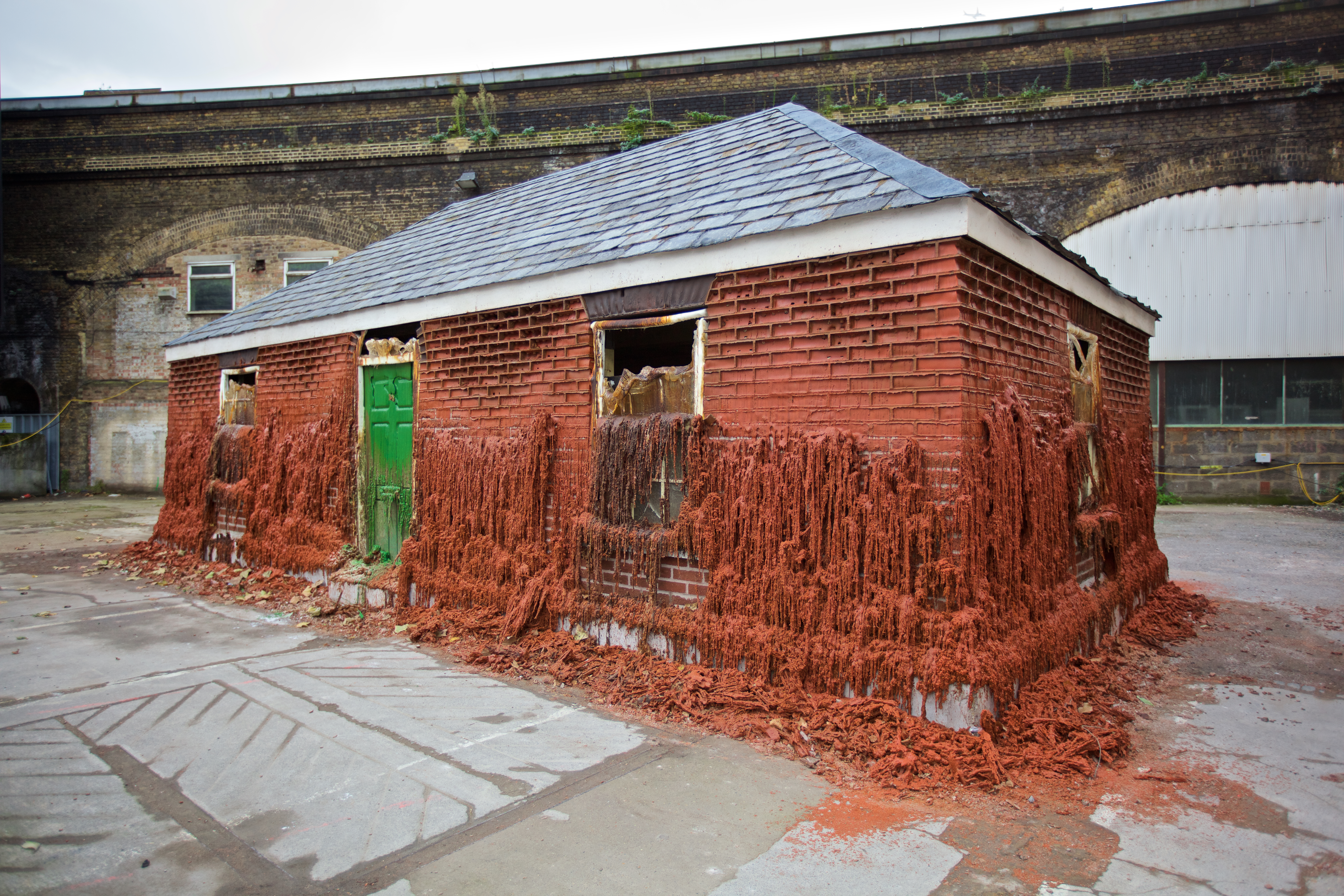
- The sculpture on 8 November 2014
- Artist: Alex Chinneck
- Year: 2014
- Type: Sculpture
- Medium: Paraffin wax
- Subject: House
- Location: London, United Kingdom; 51.5046°N 0.0936°W
- Website: alexchinneck.com/project/a-pound-of-flesh-for-50p/

A Pound of Flesh for 50p, also known as Melting House, was a temporary outdoor sculpture by artist Alex Chinneck, located in London, England. Part of the city's Merge Festival, the two-storey house sculpture was constructed from 8,000 paraffin wax bricks and it was designed to melt with assistance from a heating apparatus over the course of the installation. It was displayed from 26 September to 18 November 2014, at 40 Southwark Street, SE1 9HP, the structure's roof being gradually lowered as the wax melted. After it had been reduced to "a pile of hardened goo", the sculpture was removed.

== See also ==
- 2014 in art
