= Blood Swept Lands and Seas of Red =

2014 art installation in London

- United Kingdom
- For the centenary of the outbreak of World War I
- Established: 17 July 2014
- Unveiled: 11 November 2014
- Location: 51.50912°N 0.07528°W moat at the Tower of London
- Designed by: Paul Cummins; Tom Piper
- Commemorated: 888,246 by ceramic poppies
- Statistics source: Tower of London Remembers

Blood Swept Lands and Seas of Red was a public art installation created in the moat of the Tower of London, England, between July and November 2014. It commemorated the centenary of the outbreak of World War I and consisted of 888,246 ceramic red poppies, each intended to represent one British or Colonial serviceman killed in the War. The ceramic artist was Paul Cummins, with conceptual design by the stage designer Tom Piper. The work's title was taken from the first line of a poem by an unknown soldier in World War I.

== Background ==
The work's title came from a poem discovered by Paul Cummins and was used by Tom Piper as the inspiration for his conceptual design. It was written by an unknown World War I soldier from Derbyshire, who joined up in the early days of the war and died at the Front during the First World War. The poem begins: "The blood swept lands and seas of red,/ Where angels dare to tread / ... ". The poem was contained in the soldier's unsigned will, found by Cummins among old records in Chesterfield, Derbyshire.

The work was created by Paul Cummins Ceramics in conjunction with Historic Royal Palaces to be displayed in the moat of the Tower of London, which was used in the early days of the war as a training ground for City of London workers who had enlisted to fight – the "Stockbrokers' Battalion".

== Form ==
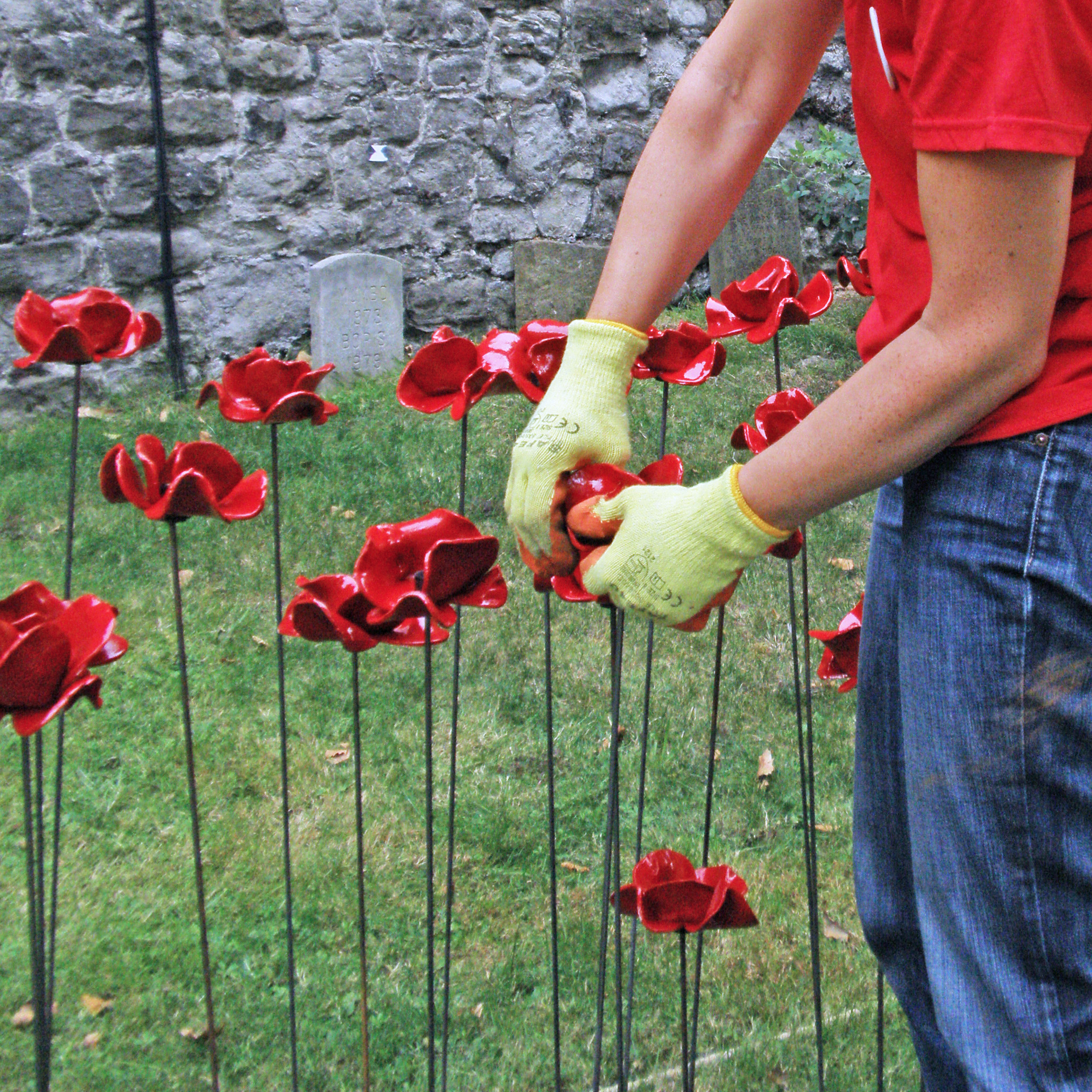
Volunteer "planting" ceramic poppies

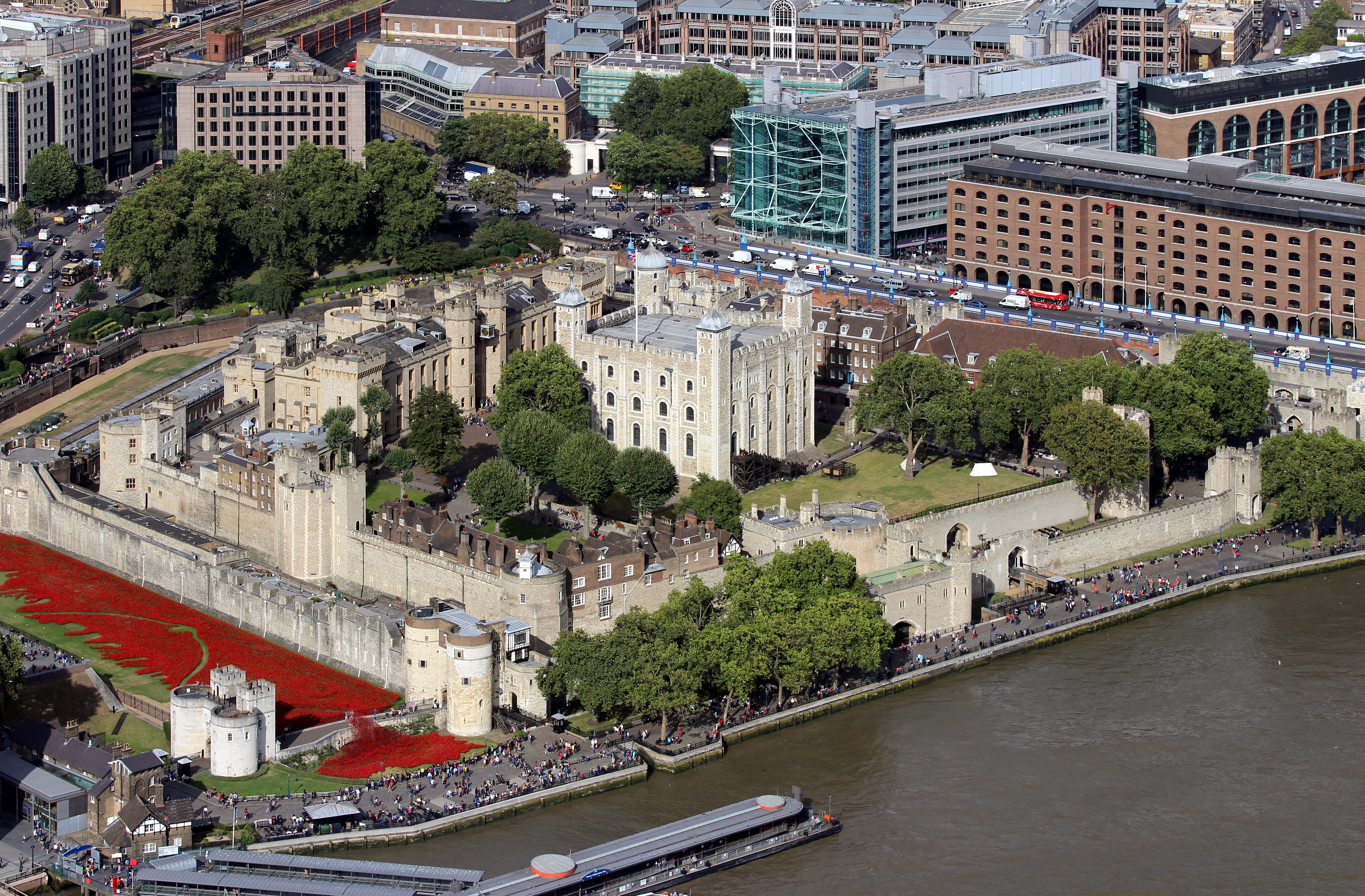
View of the Tower of London from The Shard, August 2014, with Blood Swept Lands and Seas of Red visible in the moat

The work consisted of a sea of ceramic red poppies, in a design which appeared to flow out of the Tower itself and ripple across the moat. There were a series of designed elements which added drama, height and movement to the installation: the "Weeping Window" flowing out of a window in Legge's Mount in the West Moat, (which became the iconic image), "Over the Top", a cascade of poppies down the wall on the wharf side of the moat and the "Wave", a free-standing twisted metal sculpture covered in poppies which curled over the main causeway into the Tower.

The ceramic poppies were individually hand-made at Cummins' ceramics works in Derbyshire and at Johnson Tiles in Tunstall, Stoke-on-Trent. The poppies were added to the installation progressively by volunteers. The 497,000 kg of the Etruria Marl-based Etruscan red earthenware used, as well as the majority of the manufacturing equipment and materials, were supplied by Potclays Limited in Stoke-on-Trent. There were eventually 888,246 of the flowers, representing one count of the number of British and Colonial military fatalities in World War I.

The first poppy was "planted" on 17 July 2014, and the work was unveiled on 5 August (the day following the centenary of Britain's entry into the war). A team of about 17,500 volunteers put the poppies in place, overseen by Tom Piper and Yeoman Warder Jim Duncan, making this a true public artwork. The last one was planted on 11 November 2014 (Remembrance Day), by a 13-year-old cadet, Harry Hayes, from the Combined Cadet Force (CCF) of Reading Blue Coat School. After that day a team of about 8,000 volunteers began removing the flowers. Members of the public had been able to pre-order the ceramic poppies for £25 each, with a share of the proceeds (estimated at more than £15 million) going to six service charities: COBSEO, Combat Stress, Coming Home, Help for Heroes, the Royal British Legion and SSAFA.

At around sunset each day between 1 September and 10 November, the names of 180 World War I service personnel, nominated by members of the public to appear on a Roll of Honour, were read aloud by a Yeoman Warder or guest reader, followed by the Last Post bugle call.

== Official visits and public reaction ==
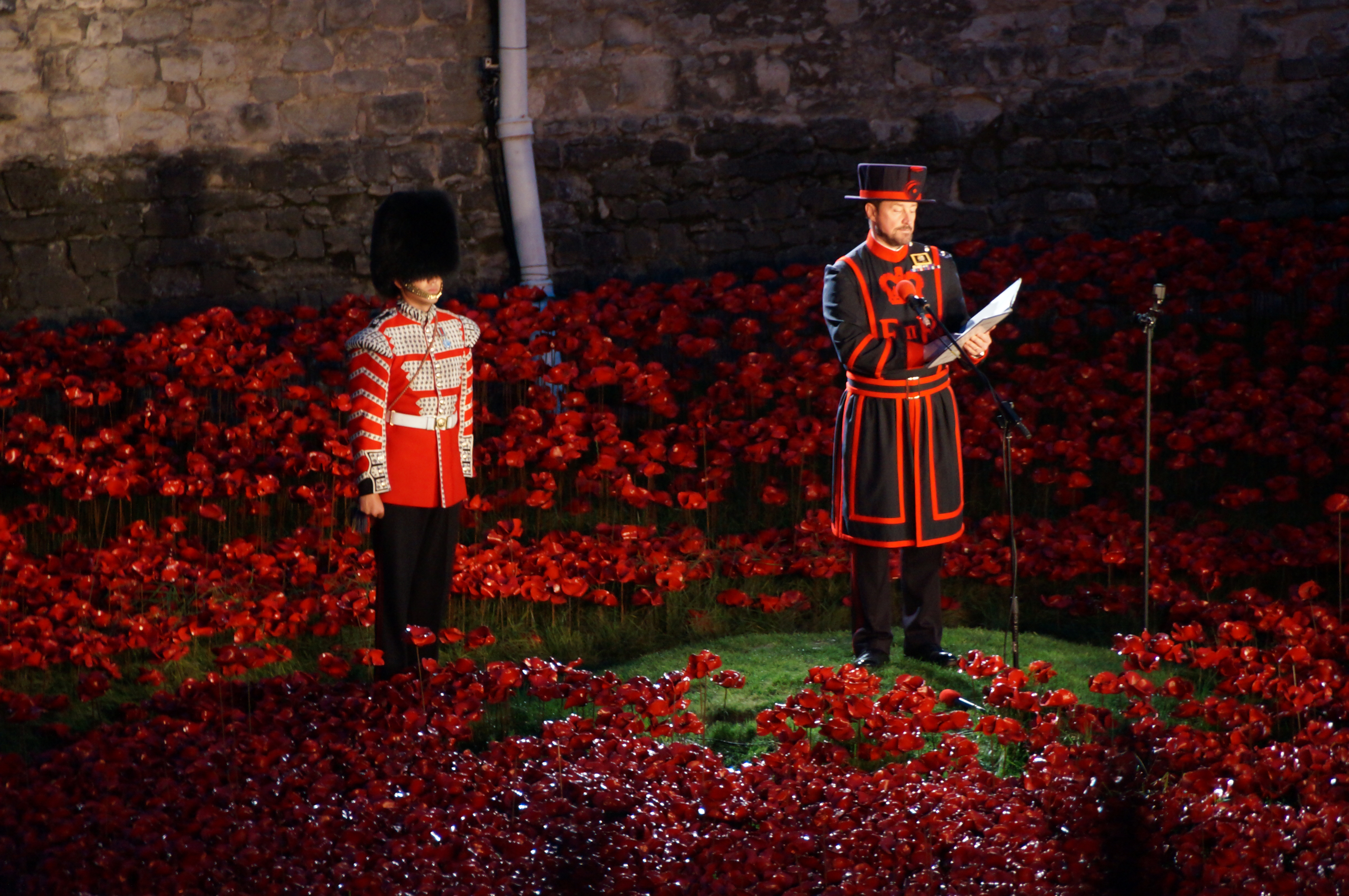
Reading of the Roll of Honour, to be followed by playing of the Last Post

The installation was visited by the Princes William and Harry and the Duchess of Cambridge on the day of its opening, and by the Queen and the Duke of Edinburgh on 16 October. The Queen later spoke about the memorial in her annual Christmas Message, broadcast on 25 December 2014.

In all, an estimated 5 million people saw the installation, and the huge visitor demand saw the Prime Minister David Cameron and other politicians join calls to try and extend the period for which the installation remained at the Tower so that more visitors would be able to pay their respects. Historic Royal Palaces and the artist Paul Cummins resisted such calls, stating that the transience of the installation was a key part of the artistic concept, and that the poppies would be removed as planned and distributed to their purchasers. On 8 November it was announced that Wave, which rose up over the Tower's entrance, would remain in place until the end of the month and that following this, the sculptures Wave and Weeping Window would be taken on a tour of the UK, organised by 14–18 NOW. This tour would last until the centenary of the armistice of World War I in November 2018 and visit 19 locations; after the tour the sculptures would enter the Imperial War Museum's collection. A campaign was launched in December 2014 to bring the sculptural elements to Stoke-on-Trent during the tour itinerary as the majority of materials and a large number of ceramic poppies were manufactured in the city. In April 2016, about halfway through the tour, Weeping Window was installed at St Magnus Cathedral in Kirkwall, Orkney, Britain's most northerly cathedral, to commemorate the 100th anniversary of the Battle of Jutland, the biggest naval engagement of the First World War.

In recognition of the work, Paul Cummins and Tom Piper were both awarded the MBE (Member of the Order of the British Empire) in the 2015 New Year Honours.

== Critical reaction ==
Although the installation struck a chord with the public, it received negative reactions from some critics in the press. A. A. Gill of The Sunday Times called it "impressive" but "curiously bland". The Guardian's art critic Jonathan Jones described it as having a "false nobility" and being a "prettified and toothless" memorial. Tom Piper said in response that "... it is a remarkably good thing that it is so accessible. We should not be trying to create something that is difficult to understand."

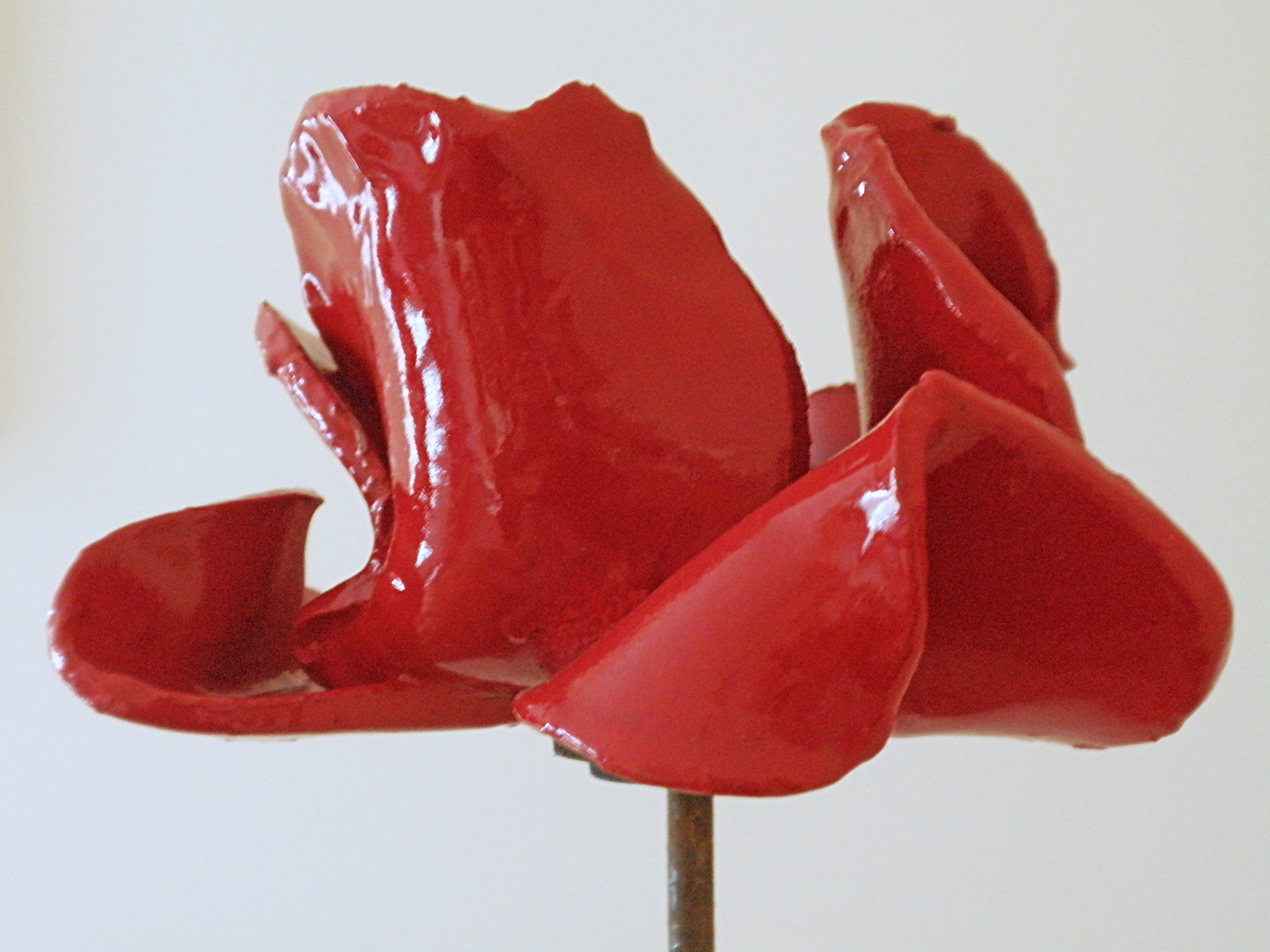
An individual ceramic poppy

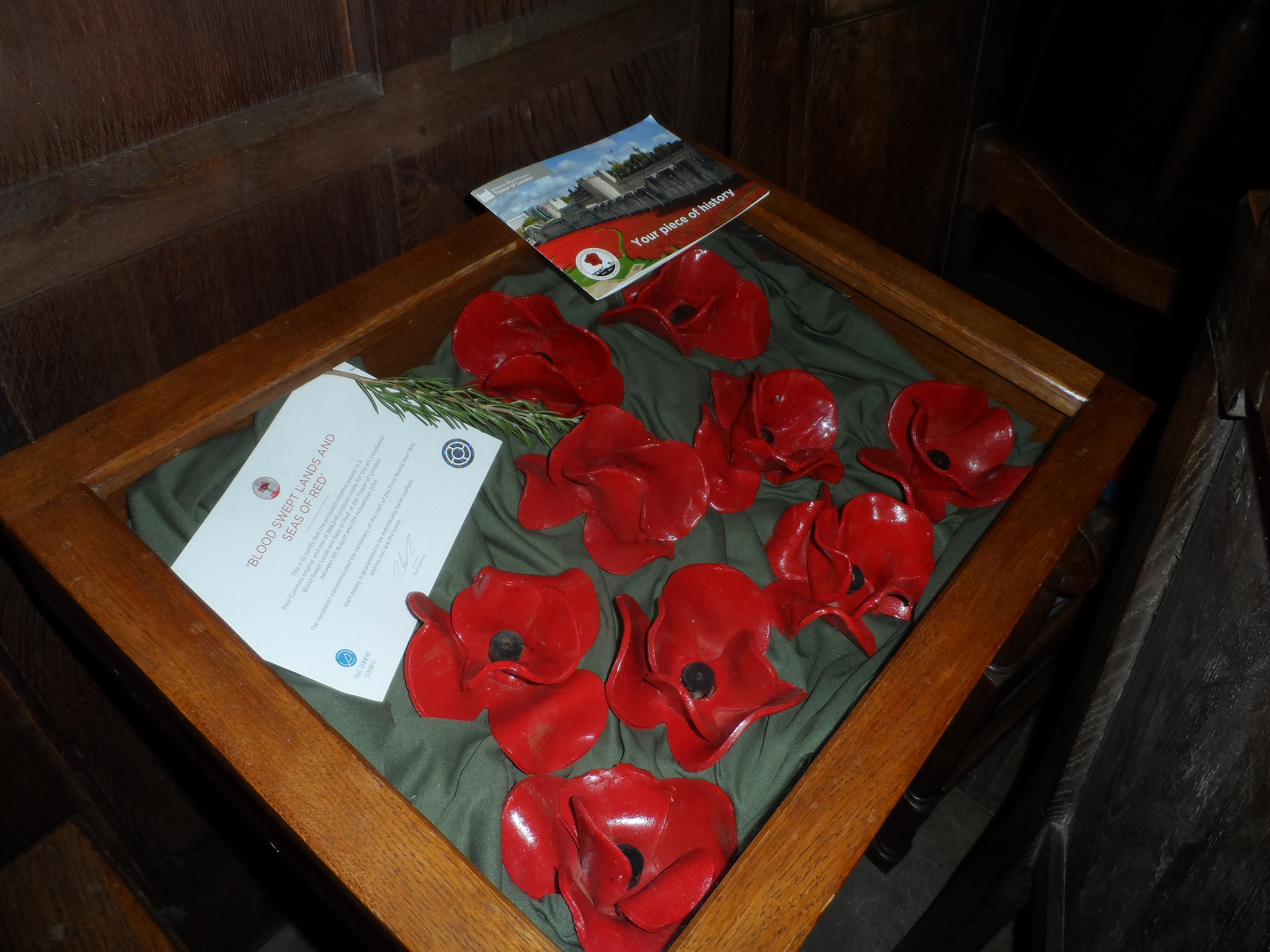
Poppies from the display with a certificate in a cabinet at a church

== UK tour ==
In November 2014, it was announced that two sculptures from the installation, Wave and Weeping Window, would tour venues around the UK until 2018. This was organised by 14-18 NOW. The scheduled venues were as follows:

=== Weeping Window ===
12 Sep 2015 – 1 Nov 2015	Woodhorn Museum, Ashington, Northumberland
7 Nov 2015 – 17 Jan 2016	St George's Hall, Liverpool
22 Apr 2016 – 12 Jun 2016	St Magnus Cathedral, Kirkwall, Orkney
30 Jun 2016 – 25 Sep 2016	Black Watch Museum, Perth
12 Oct 2016 – 20 Nov 2016	Caernarfon Castle
25 Mar 2017 – 14 May 2017	Hull Maritime Museum
9 Jun 2017 – 23 Jul 2017	The Silk Mill, Derby
8 Aug 2017 – 24 Sep 2017	Senedd, Cardiff
14 Oct 2017 – 3 Dec 2017	Ulster Museum, Belfast
14 Mar 2018 – 29 Apr 2018	Hereford Cathedral
23 May 2018 – 8 Jul 2018	Carlisle Castle
2 Aug 2018 – 16 Sep 2018	Middleport Pottery, Stoke-on-Trent
5 Oct 2018 – 18 Nov 2018	Imperial War Museum, London

=== Wave ===
5 Sep 2015 – 10 Jan 2016	Yorkshire Sculpture Park
28 May 2016 – 4 Sep 2016	Lincoln Castle
12 Apr 2017 – 25 Jun 2017	Barge Pier, Shoeburyness
23 Aug 2017 – 19 Nov 2017	Plymouth Naval Memorial
13 Apr 2018 – 24 Jun 2018	Royal Armouries at Fort Nelson
8 Sep 2018 – 25 Nov 2018	Imperial War Museum North, Manchester

After the end of the UK-wide 14-18 NOW tour Wave and Weeping Window will enter the Imperial War Museum's collection.

== Subsequent commemorations ==
A similar tribute also designed by Piper, Beyond the Deepening Shadow, in which 10,000 flames were lit, again at the Tower of London, was installed to mark the centenary of the end of the war. It ran nightly, ending on Armistice Day (11 November) 2018.

In 2025, another poppy-based installation, The Tower Remembers, designed by Piper and with almost 30,000 ceramic poppies made by Cummins, was put in place at the Tower to mark the 80th anniversary of the end of World War II in Europe. It is planned to remain on display until Armistice Day on 11 November 2025.

== See also ==
- Remembrance poppy
