= Statue of Amy Winehouse =

Statue in Camden Town, London

Coordinates: 51.5424°N 0.1478°W

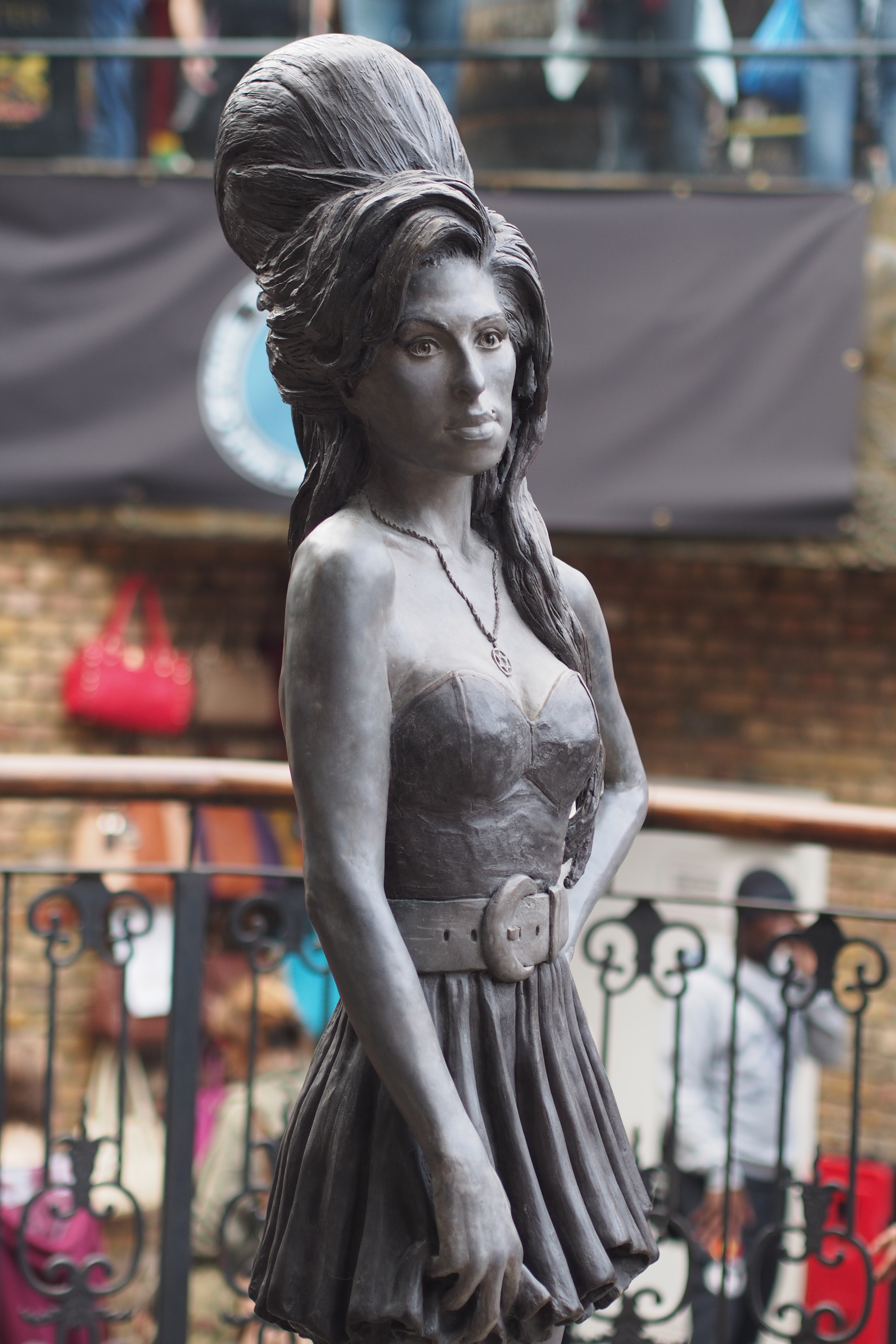
- The statue in 2014
- Artist: Scott Eaton
- Year: 2014
- Completion date: 14 September 2014
- Type: Sculpture
- Medium: Bronze
- Subject: Amy Winehouse
- Dimensions: 175 cm (69 in)
- Location: Camden Town, London, NW1

A bronze statue of the British singer Amy Winehouse is located at the Stables Market in Camden Town, in north London. Sculpted by Scott Eaton, it was unveiled in 2014, three years after the singer's death.

== Description and history ==
Amy Winehouse (1983–2011) was a British singer and songwriter who had become strongly associated with Camden Town until her death in 2011. Winehouse died at her nearby Camden Square home of alcohol poisoning on 23 July 2011. The 1.59-metre (5 ft 3 in) tall statue depicts Winehouse with her hand on her hip, wearing high heels, and with her signature beehive hairstyle. The singer's statue also wears a Star of David necklace and on the day of the unveiling had a real red rose in her hair. The charcoal grey work was created by the sculptor Scott Eaton, who said that it had been designed to convey Winehouse's "attitude and strength, but also give subtle hints of insecurity".

Eaton had gained the commission after showing his ideas to Winehouse's father. The sculpture was not meant to reflect a particular picture or outfit but was intended to capture an amalgamation of her appearances. The sculptor drew attention to the position of her arms, with one hand resting on her hip and the other holding the edge of her skirt. Small details like this and the way the figure's foot turn inwards were intended to give a "personality" to the statue.

The statue's original intended location was in the Roundhouse music venue in nearby Chalk Farm, but due to poor public accessibility at that site the work was instead erected in the Stables Market. It was unveiled by Winehouse's friend, the actress Barbara Windsor, in the presence of Winehouse's parents, Mitch and Janis Winehouse, on 14 September 2014, which would have been the singer's 31st birthday.

=== Recent history ===
The statue was at the centre of an antisemitic incident in February 2024, after a pro-Palestine sticker was placed over the singer's Star of David necklace as a response to the Gaza War. The Environment Secretary, Steve Barclay, called the incident "deeply concerning".

== Reception ==
The reviews of the statue were positive, although one commentator remarked that it was "apparently designed in her likeness". Camden Council had made an exception in allowing the statue to be installed, as it would normally only give permission for statues of people who have been dead for at least twenty years. Mitch Winehouse, who had approved the sculptor, said that "Amy was in love with Camden and it is the place her fans from all over the world associate her with". Mitch Winehouse also said that the sight of the statue was "incredibly emotional" and that it was "like stopping her in a beautiful moment in time ... We really hope Amy's fans love the statue."

Winehouse's mother, Janis, said that "I am pleased with how the statue turned out because you can see that it's Amy ... Camden is Amy's place, it's where she belongs". Windsor said that "I've had many honours throughout my career, but this is the greatest honour ... I was one of the fortunate people who got to know Amy in the last few years of her too short life. Not only was she one of the greatest talents that this country has ever produced, she was a warm, lovely kind and fun lady ... Amy loved Camden with a passion and Camden loved her so it's only right her presence should remain here".

== See also ==
- 2014 in art
- List of public art in the London Borough of Camden § Camden Town
