= Paul Cummins =

English artist (born 1977)

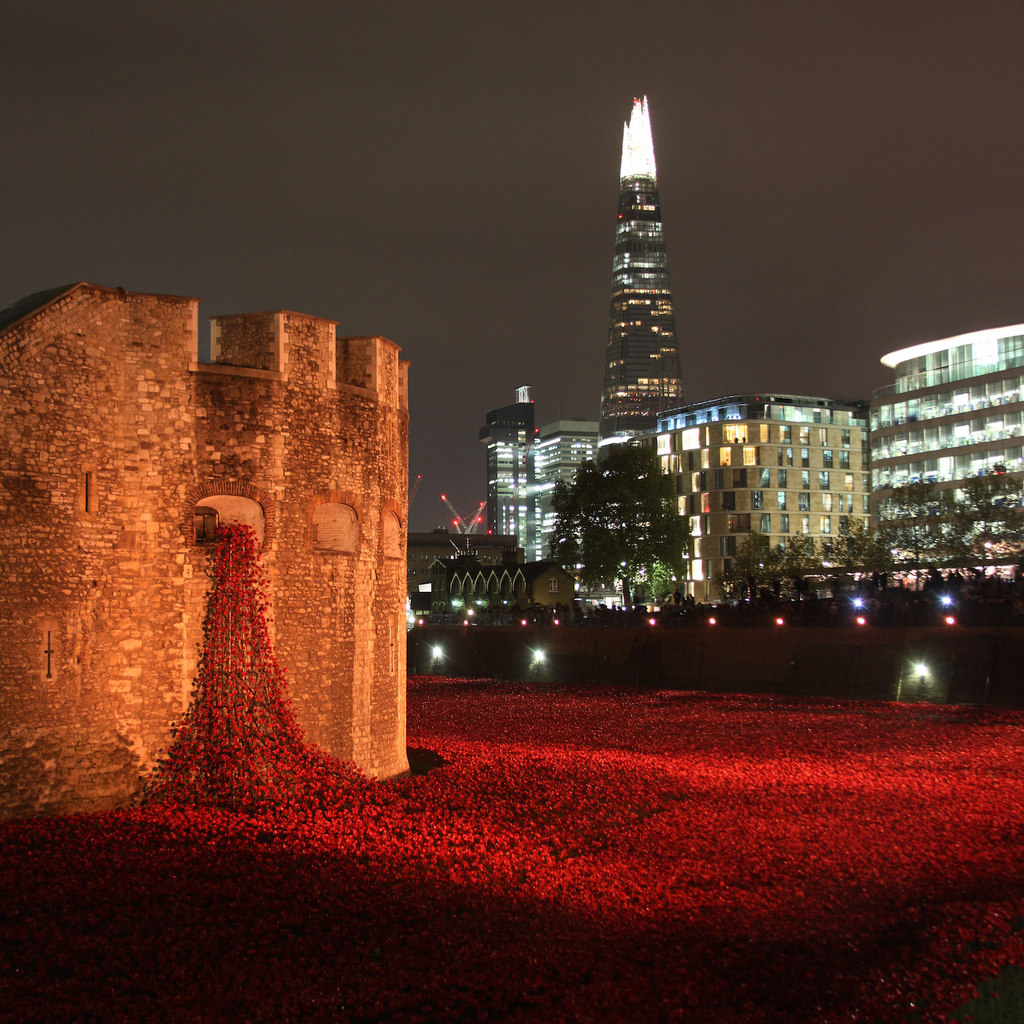
Cummins' Blood Swept Lands and Seas of Red at the Tower of London, November 2014

Paul Cummins MBE (born 26 September 1977) is an English artist from Chesterfield, Derbyshire, who produces landscape installations using ceramic flowers.

== Education / work ==
Cummins worked as a maker of architectural models, and then studied ceramics at the University of Derby's College of Arts. He has colour associated dyslexia, and was one of the artists with disabilities commissioned by the London 2012 Cultural Olympiad, the UK Arts Councils and the British Council to produce works for Unlimited, a programme celebrating disabled artists' work in the run up to and during the London 2012 Olympics and Paralympics.

Cummins conceived the monumental installation Blood Swept Lands and Seas of Red at the Tower of London, which commemorated the British and Colonial losses in the First World War with 888,246 ceramic poppies. Cummins produced the flowers together with a number of assistants in Derbyshire, while the setting of the work was designed by theatre designer Tom Piper. During the making of the work in his workshop, Cummins accidentally crushed his hand in an industrial roller. This left him requiring extensive surgery and resulted in the loss of a finger and use of his dominant hand. He said in interviews that was "overwhelmed" by the public response to this work, saying "I think that it is something everybody can relate to and they feel very personally about." However, he also received death threats for his work, stating that it was because the money was being donated to "war charities". In recognition of the success of the work, both Cummins and Piper were awarded the MBE in the 2015 New Year Honours, Cummins' award being made "for services to art and First World War commemorations".

Other clients for which Cummins has produced work include Chatsworth House, Hardwick Hall and Blenheim Palace. He is currently studying for a PhD at the University of Derby, and lecturing in crafts. The university awarded him an Honorary Master of Arts in January 2015. He was awarded an honorary PhD by London Metropolitan University in July 2015.

In 2015, Cummins also displayed at the Chelsea Flower Show. His installation "Candy" stood 8 metres tall and was made up of over 2,500 porcelain tulips in a variety of colours. Proceeds from this are reported to be going to a charity whose cause affects 1 in 3 people, but was never named.
