= Tom Piper =

British theatre designer (born 1964)

Thomas Stephen Towry Piper MBE (born 24 November 1964) is a British theatre designer who regularly collaborated with director Michael Boyd. He became an associate designer with the Royal Shakespeare Company in 2004.

== Early life ==
Tom Piper was born in London on 24 November 1964, the only son of art historian and museum director (National Portrait Gallery, London) Sir David Piper (1918–90) and novelist and playwright Lady Anne Piper (1920–2017), and the younger brother of three sisters. He was educated at Magdalen College School, Oxford. In 1984 he entered Trinity College, Cambridge to read biology, but in mid-course switched to art history. From 1988 to 1990 he attended the Slade School of Art postgraduate course in theatre design.

== Theatre ==
In 1990 he spent six months with Peter Brook's theatre company in Paris, working on Brook's visionary production of The Tempest, before becoming a freelance designer working at the Nottingham Playhouse, Hampstead Theatre and the Royal Lyceum Theatre in Edinburgh and winning the London Fringe Best Design Award for Cat in the Ghetto, staged at the Tabard Theatre, Chiswick, West London.

He first worked with Michael Boyd at the Tron Theatre in Glasgow with his design for the 1991 production of the pantomime Jack and the Beanstalk. Since then, their careers have been closely linked.

Piper claims he first got into theatre design almost by accident. He had wanted to be a biologist and was studying natural sciences at Cambridge University, when his old school friend, Sam Mendes, was directing a production of The Tempest and Piper volunteered to build the set.

A year after Boyd became RSC Artistic Director, Piper was appointed the RSC's associate designer. Boyd died in 2023.

== Other work ==
Piper collaborated with ceramic artist Paul Cummins in 2014 on the Blood Swept Lands and Seas of Red installation at the Tower of London. The installation consisted of 888,246 ceramic poppies and was a commemoration of the centenary of World War I.

In 2024, Piper designed Taylor Swift Songbook Trail, an "approximately 1 mile long" [...] "journey through V&A South Kensington's galleries" with "13 stops" which displayed costumes worn by Swift over the course of her career.

== Achievements and awards ==
In 2009, Piper collected the Laurence Olivier Award for Best Costume Design for his work on The Histories.

He was appointed a Member of the Order of the British Empire (MBE) in the 2015 New Year Honours for services to theatre and First World War commemorations.

== Personal life ==
He is the father of five daughters.
