= Alex Chinneck =

British sculptor (born 1984)

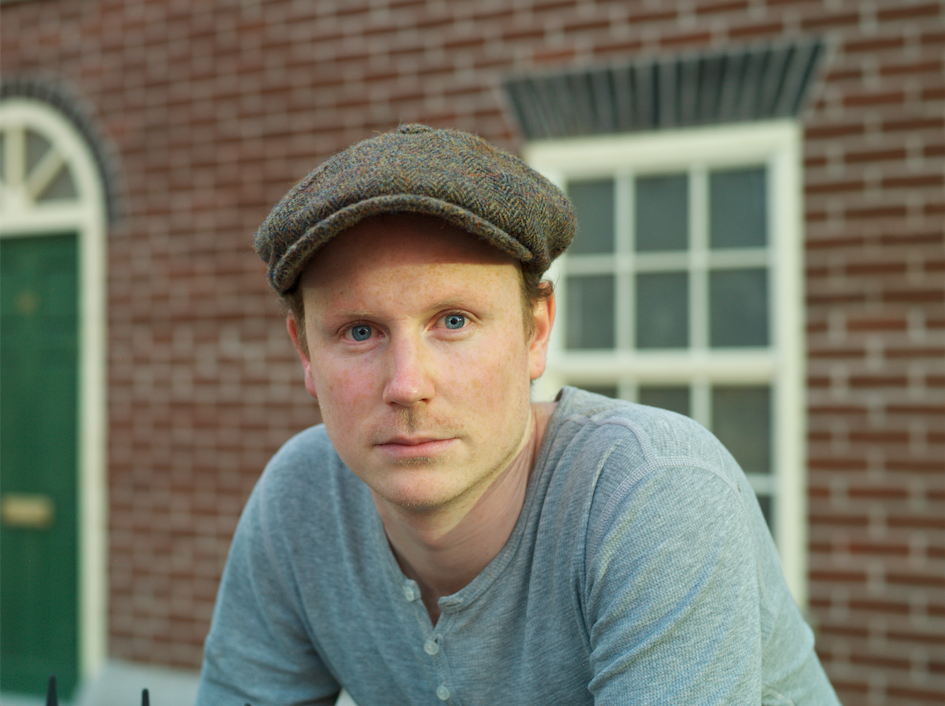
- Alex Chinneck standing next to A Pound of Flesh for 50p
- Born: 1984 (age 41–42)
- Education: Chelsea College of Arts, Royal British Society of Sculptors
- Known for: Public art, sculpture
- Notable work: A Pound of Flesh for 50p

Alex Chinneck MRSS (born 1 October 1984) is a British sculptor known for creating temporary public artworks.

== Early life ==
Alex was educated at Bedford Modern School, where his father taught PE. He had ambitions to become a cricketer, having captained his school team at county level, before his interest in art at the age of 16. He studied painting at Chelsea College of Arts, graduating with a Bachelor of Arts, and became a Member of the Royal Society of Sculptors.

== Career ==
Shortly after college, he was granted a Gilbert Bayes award by the Royal Society of Sculptors to help in his transition to professional practice, following which he collaborated with Conrad Shawcross on his work. After initially focusing on small sculptures, influenced by House designed by Rachel Whiteread and the work of Richard Wilson, Chinneck started working on large scale designs.

Most of Chinneck's earliest public artworks were realised across Greater London. His early works include Telling the Truth Through False Teeth (2012), where the artist used 1,248 pieces of glass to create 312 identically smashed windows across the derelict facade of a factory in Hackney, From the Knees of my Nose to the Belly of my Toes (2013) in Margate where Chinneck created the illusion that the entire facade of house had slid into the garden, and Under the Weather but Over the Moon (2013), a commercial property situated on Blackfriars Road created to look as if it had become completely inverted. For his work in Hackney, local residents have described Chinneck as the "Banksy of Glass".

Subsequent works include Take my Lightning but Don't Steal my Thunder (2014), a building located in Covent Garden designed to appear as if it floated in the air, and A Pound of Flesh for 50p (2014), a house on Southwark Street made from 7,500 paraffin wax bricks which slowly melted. The installation, Pick Yourself Up and Pull Yourself Together (2015) saw a Vauxhall Corsa suspended upside down in Southbank Centre car park.

In 2015, Chinneck was commissioned to create one of the flagship projects for London Design Festival on Greenwich Peninsula. Chinneck’s response to the site - an inverted electricity pylon standing 37 metres tall - has been voted among the best public artworks in London. Titled A bullet from a shooting star, the sculpture forms part of The Line, London’s first dedicated public art walk, which also features work by Anthony Gormley and Anish Kapoor.

The artist’s first permanent London landmark was completed in 2017. Six pins and half a dozen needles (2017) creates the illusion that the front of a building on Fulham Palace Road has been dramatically cracked into two halves.

In 2018, Chinneck was commissioned to create a temporary intervention for a development site in Ashford. His installation Open to the Public created the illusion that the walls of a 1960s office block had been unzipped to reveal the interior. The following year, in Italy, the artist created the same feat on a larger scale, unzipping the walls and floor of a seemingly historic Milanese building for Milan Design Week. The installation A sprinkle of light and a spoonful of night was named by Dezeen as one of the top ten art installations of 2019.

For his most recent public intervention, Alphabetti Spaghetti (2019), the artist has tied a series of traditional red pillar post boxes into knots. The artwork appeared overnight in three towns across England.

The Guardian has called Chinneck a "master of architectural illusion". Alex Chinneck won the 33rd GNMH AWARD.

== Selected works ==
- Telling the Truth Through False Teeth (2012)
- From the Knees of my Nose to the Belly of my Toes (2013)
- Under the Weather but Over the Moon (2013)
- Take my Lightning but Don't Steal my Thunder (2014)
- A Pound of Flesh for 50p (2014)
- Pick Yourself Up and Pull Yourself Together (2015)
- A Bullet from a Shooting Star (2015)
- Six pins and half a dozen needles (2017)
- Open to the public (2018)
- A sprinkle of light and a spoonful of night (2019)
- Alphabetti Spaghetti (2019)
- Loop-de-Loop Canal Boat (2024)

== Gallery ==
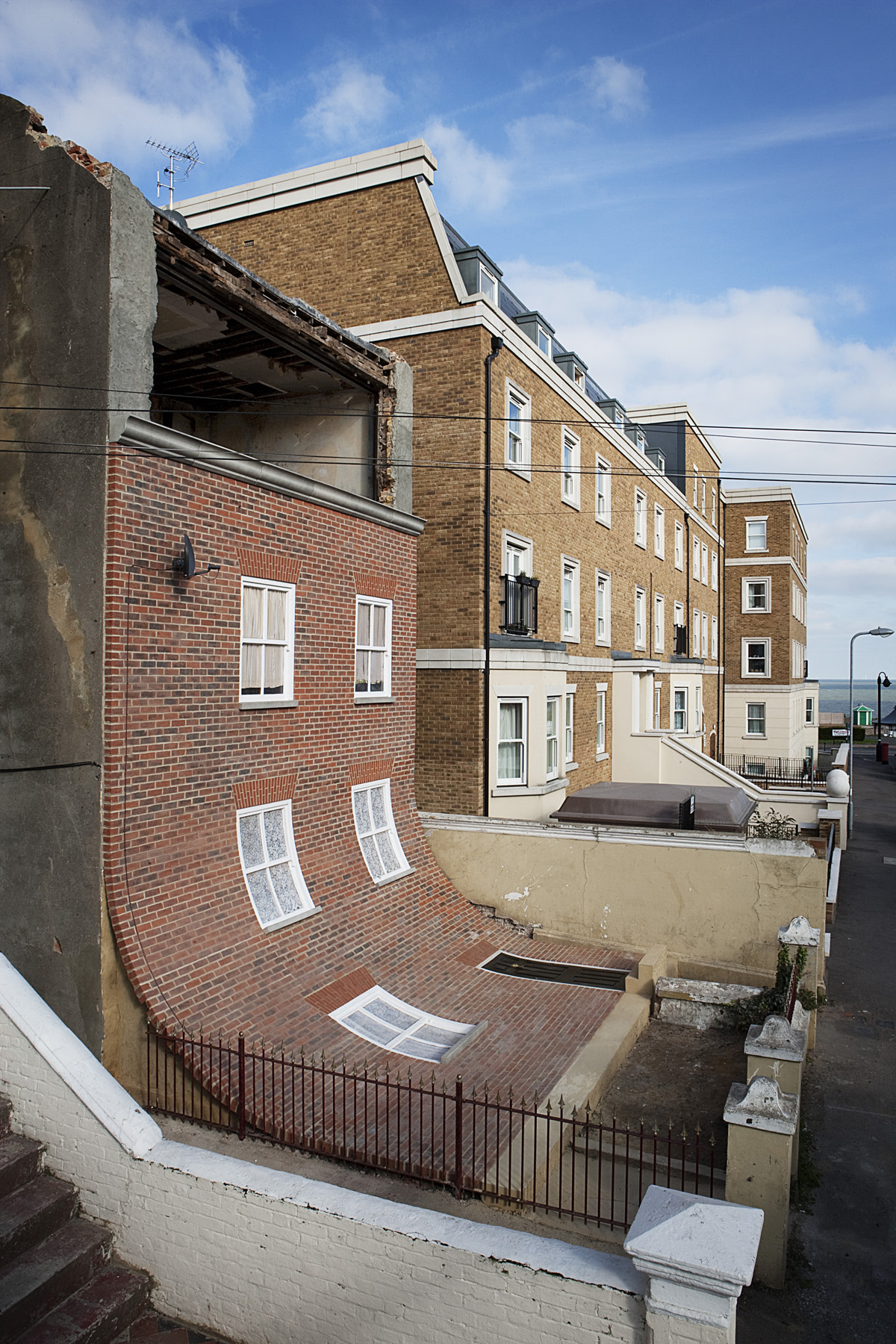
From the knees of my nose to the belly of my toes

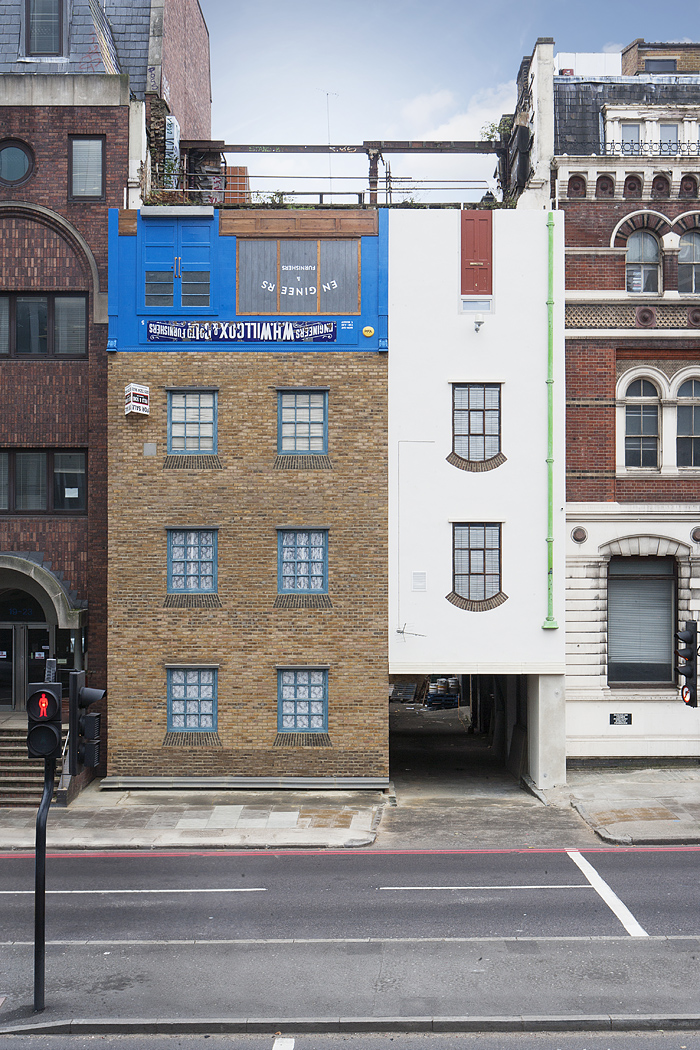
Under the weather but over the moon

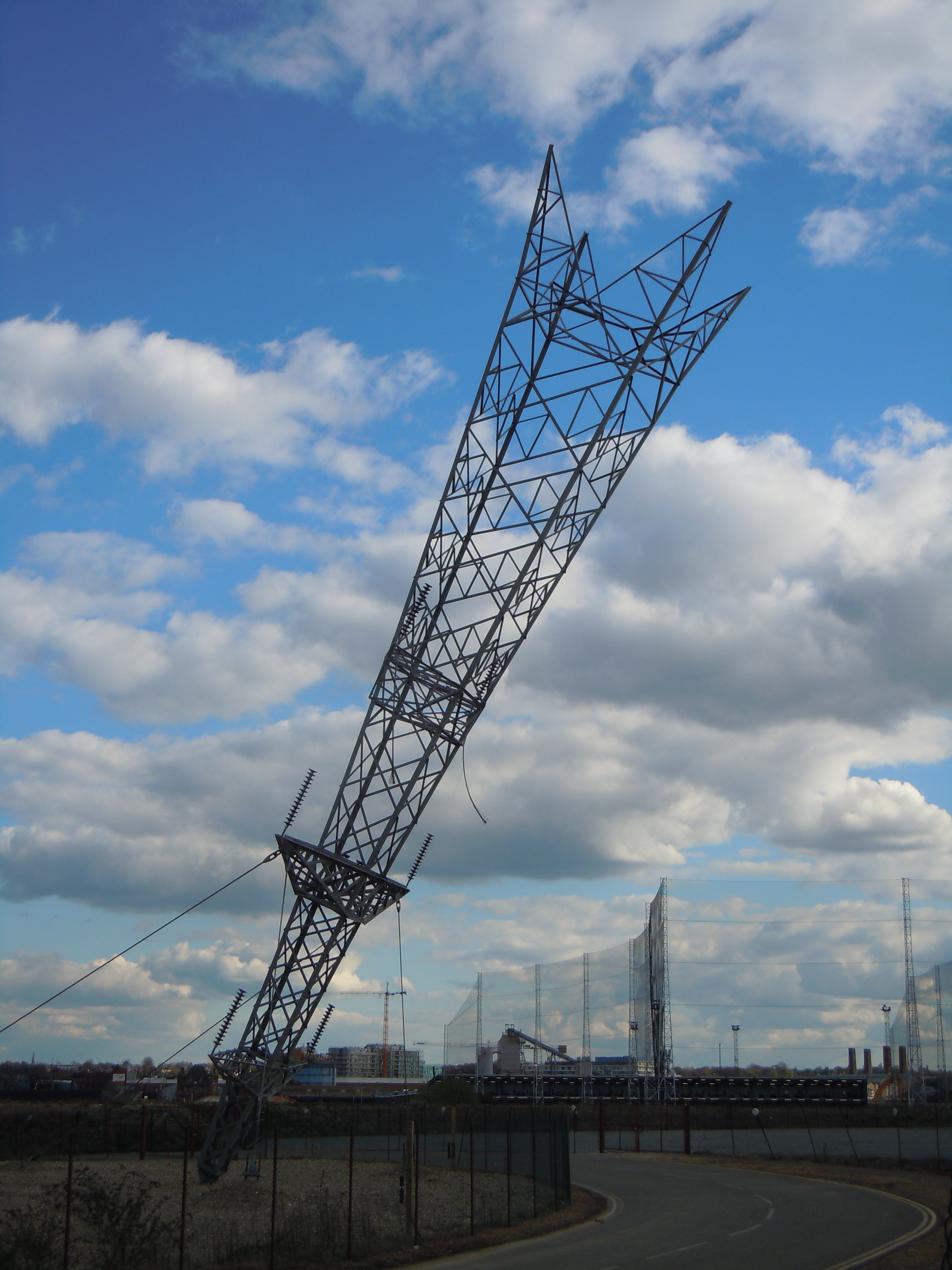
A bullet from a shooting star 2015

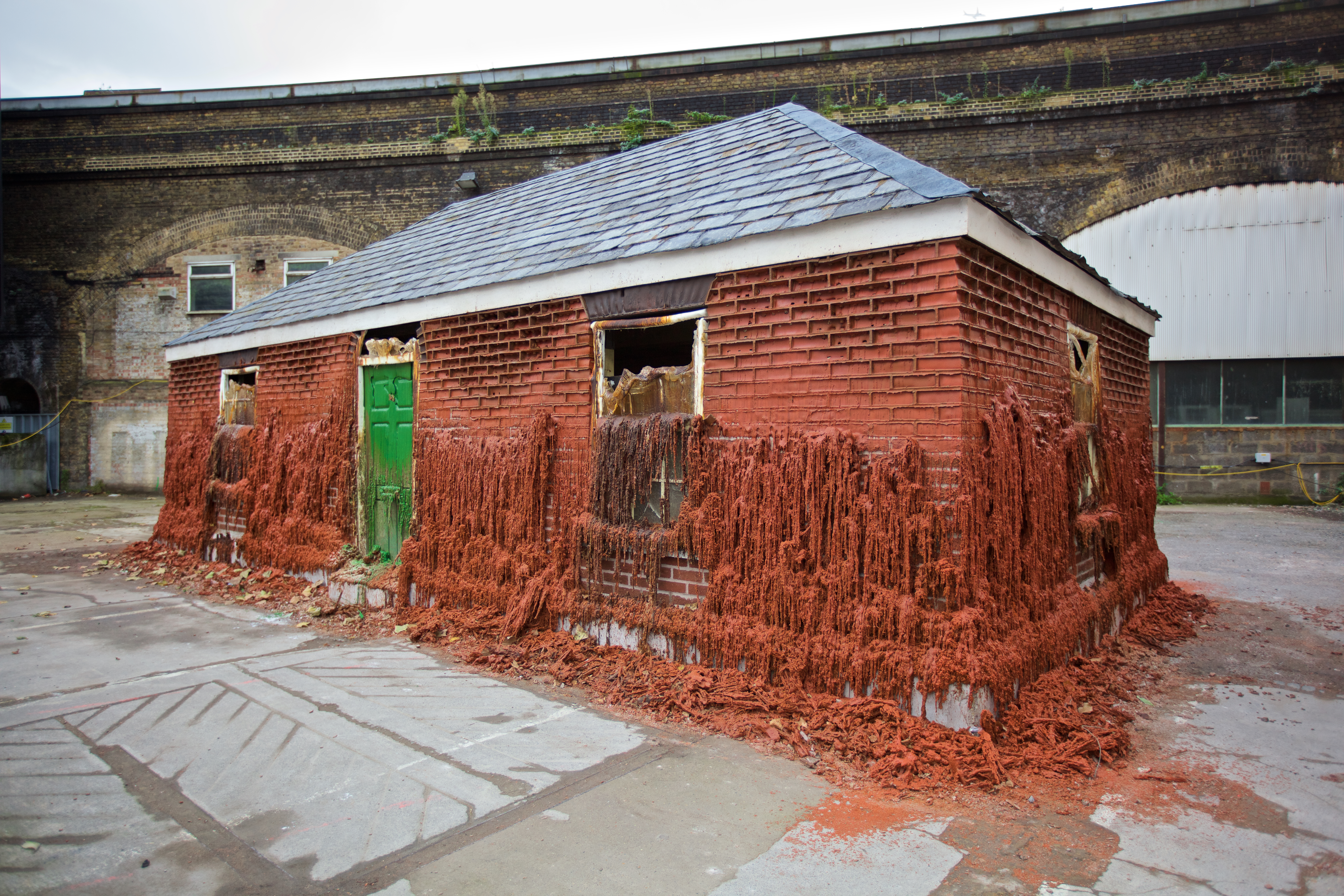
A pound of flesh for 50p (The Melting House)

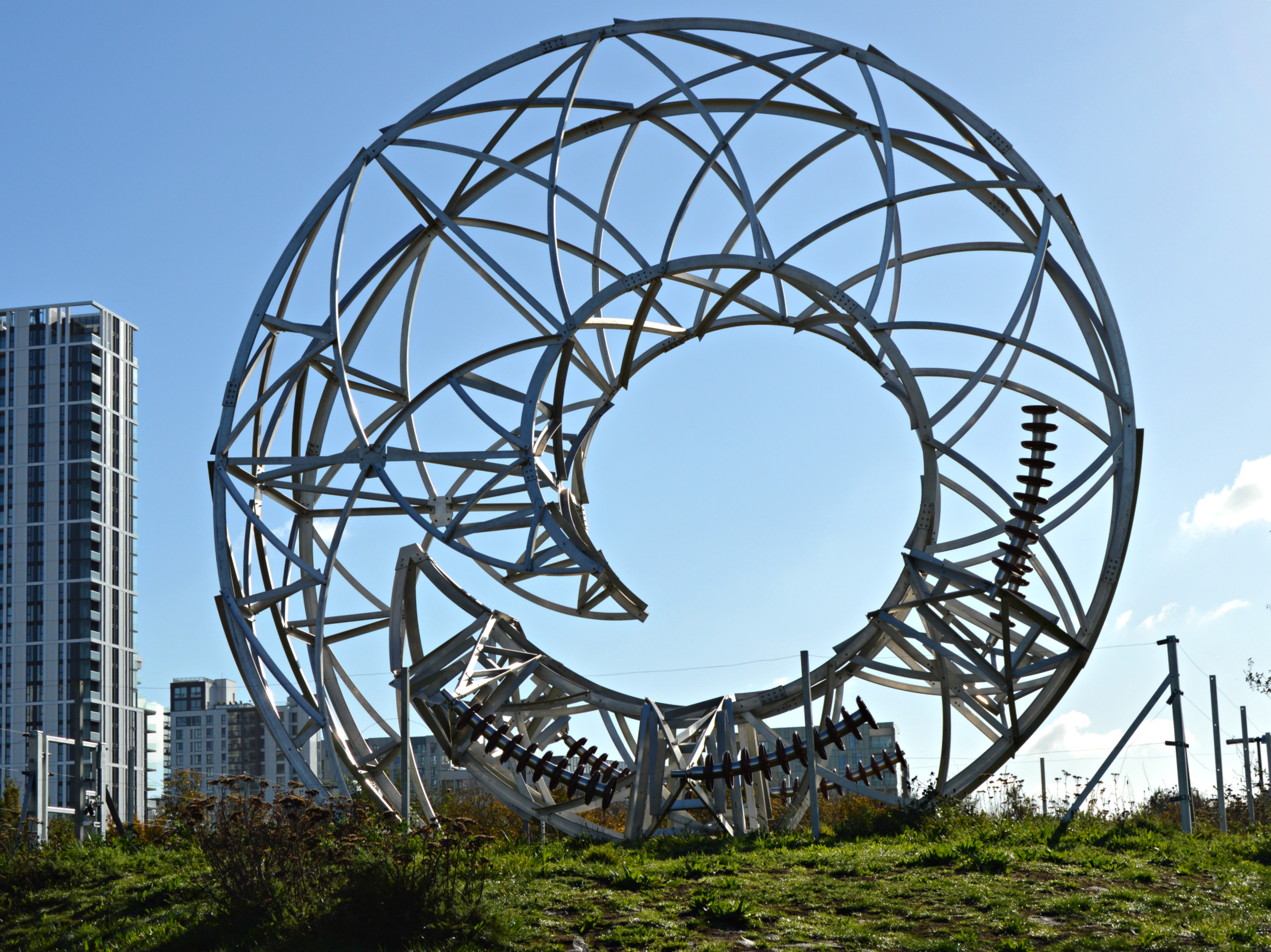
Straight jacket star jumps

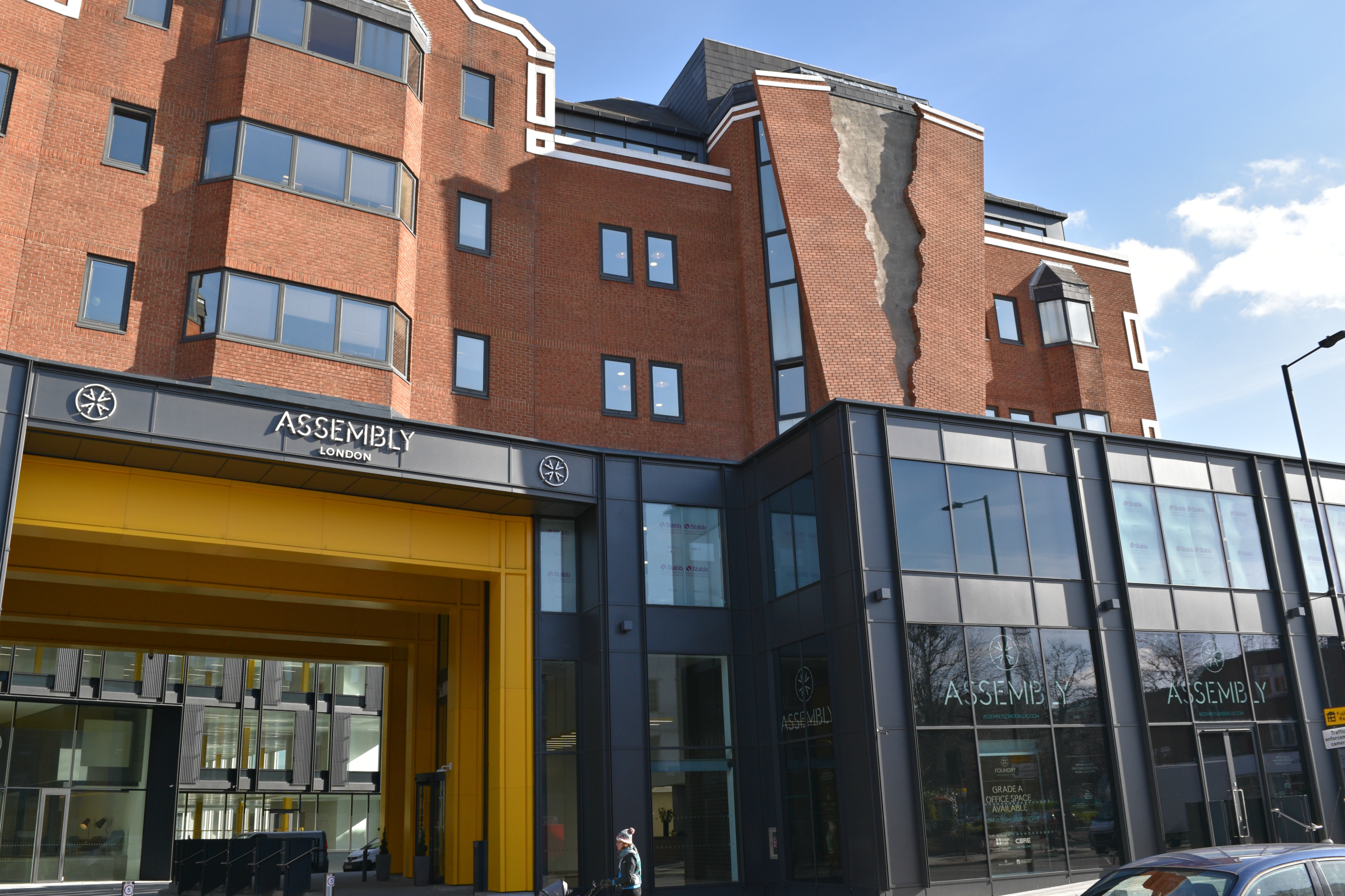
Art sculpture in West London

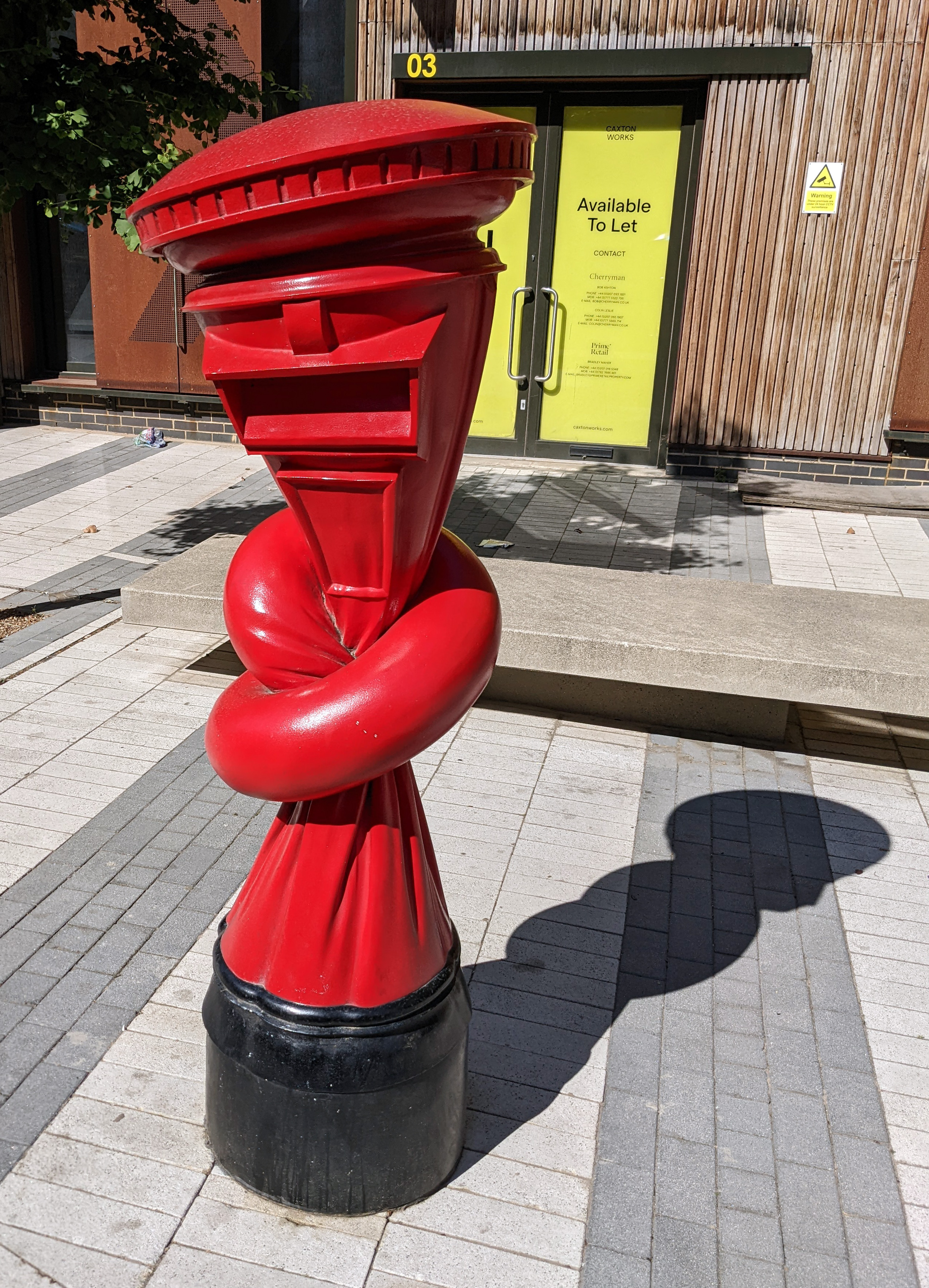
Alphabetti Spaghetti in Canning Town, London
