= Jennifer Wynne Reeves =

American painter

Jennifer Wynne Reeves (born 1963 in Royal Oak, Michigan – died June 22, 2014) was an American painter. She studied at the Vermont Studio School between 1984 and 1985. Her work was the subject of solo shows at the Max Protech (2001), Gorney, Bravin, and Lee (2000 in the Project Room), LittleJohn and Ramis Barquet Galleries, among other venues. She was a 2012 recipient of a Guggenheim fellowship. in 2008 the Worcester Art Museum held a solo exhibition of selections from the previous three years of her work. her work is included in the collection of the Seattle Art Museum.

Reeves died from a brain tumor on June 22, 2014, at the age of 51.

In 2019, the Drawing Center exhibited her work in Jennifer Wynne Reeves: All Right for Now.
