= Taylor McKimens =

American contemporary artist

Taylor McKimens (born 1976) is an American contemporary artist whose work encompasses drawing, painting, sculpture and installation. Born in Seattle, Washington, and raised in Winterhaven, California, near the Mexican border, McKimens developed a graphic visual language from comics, commercial illustration and the landscape and vernacular culture of the American Southwest. He received a BFA from ArtCenter College of Design in Pasadena in 1999.

== Early life and education ==
McKimens was born in Seattle in 1976 and grew up in Winterhaven, California. He initially studied illustration and later attended ArtCenter College of Design, graduating in 1999. In interviews he has described comics, commercial printing, custom-car graphics and the desert environment of southeastern California as formative visual sources.

== Career ==
McKimens moved to New York after graduating from ArtCenter. His early exhibitions included work at New Image Art in Los Angeles and Clementine Gallery in New York. In 2004 Linda Yablonsky discussed his work in ARTnews in an essay on humor and cartoon imagery in contemporary art.

In 2005 McKimens curated Stranger Town at Dinter Fine Art in New York. Writing in The New York Times, Roberta Smith used the exhibition to discuss the increasingly porous boundaries between contemporary art and fields including manga, commercial illustration, animation, skateboarding and independent music. The exhibition included Tomoo Gokita, Daniel Johnston, Rich Jacobs, the Clayton Brothers, Saiman Chow, Mimiyo Tomozawa, Yusaku Hanakuma and Jason Holley. ArtAsiaPacific later described Stranger Town as a career breakthrough for Gokita.

Also in 2005, McKimens presented one of ten individual solo projects in Art Rock, a public multi-artist exhibition at Rockefeller Plaza, and was included in Greater New York at P.S.1 Contemporary Art Center, jointly organized with the Museum of Modern Art.

In 2006 PictureBox published McKimens's comic book The Drips. A related exhibition at Clementine Gallery reorganized the artwork used for the comic into a large freestanding installation. From October 2006 to January 2007 McKimens and Misaki Kawai presented concurrent solo exhibitions under the title Boroboro Dorodoro at the Watari Museum of Contemporary Art in Tokyo. Reviewing the exhibition in The Japan Times, Samantha Sinnayah discussed McKimens's interest in overlooked decay and his use of painting and life-size paper installation.

McKimens exhibited with Deitch Projects in New York during the 2000s. In 2009 he was included in New York Minute, curated by Kathy Grayson at MACRO FUTURE in Rome; the exhibition traveled in a revised form to Garage Center for Contemporary Culture in Moscow in 2011. After Deitch Projects closed in 2010, The Art Newspaper identified McKimens among former Deitch artists continuing to work with former Deitch directors Kathy Grayson and Meghan Coleman at The Hole. McKimens designed the installation for The Hole's inaugural exhibition, Not Quite Open for Business.

In 2014, Peter Saul included McKimens in If You're Accidentally Not Included, Don't Worry About It, Saul's first curated group exhibition.Micchelli, Thomas (19 April 2014). "Monsters' Ball: Peter Saul and the Company He Keeps". Hyperallergic.

That year, McKimens also contributed a Rusty Blackbird mural to the Audubon Mural Project in Upper Manhattan."Rusty Blackbird by Taylor McKimens". National Audubon Society. 20 March 2017.

In 2015, The Hole presented Stoic Youth, a solo exhibition of more than twenty paintings based on two ancient Greek sculptural heads at the Metropolitan Museum of Art. Critic Ingrid Dinter described the series as a reduction and distillation of McKimens's earlier visual vocabulary toward abstraction.Dinter, Ingrid (October 2015). "Taylor McKimens: Stoic Youth at The Hole". Whitehot Magazine."Taylor McKimens: Stoic Youth". The Hole. 2015.

The following year, McKimens undertook a month-long residency with Dio Horia in Athens, producing the solo exhibition Swapping Paint. The series continued the Hellenic imagery of Stoic Youth while incorporating colors, materials and visual details drawn from Athens and Mykonos."Taylor McKimens: Swapping Paint". Dio Horia. 2016. Later that summer he participated in Greek Gotham in Mykonos, a sixteen-artist exhibition of New York-based artists covered by T: The New York Times Style Magazine.Seligson, Hannah (8 July 2016). "The Greek Island That's Becoming an Unexpected Art Destination". The New York Times.

McKimens later returned to Southern California. In 2022, he participated in New Construction, the inaugural exhibition at The Hole's Los Angeles gallery, which revisited the premise of the gallery's 2010 inaugural New York exhibition.Stromberg, Matthew (15 February 2022). "New York gallery The Hole opening Los Angeles location just in time for Frieze". The Art Newspaper."New Construction". The Hole. 2022. He lives and works in Los Angeles.McKimens, Taylor (May 2024). "Sacred Clown of the Downtown". The Brooklyn Rail.

== Work ==
McKimens's work combines graphic drawing with painting, sculpture and installation. Early sources described his constructions as existing between two and three dimensions, and McKimens has explained that his sculptural work developed by cutting drawings away from their backgrounds and allowing them to occupy space independently.

Critics have frequently discussed the contrast between attractive color and unsettling or degraded subjects in McKimens's work. Yablonsky connected his early work to humor, economic circumstance and cartoon imagery, while The Japan Times described domestic scenes in which pastel color and detailed cartoon drawing made grotesque subjects visually compelling. His recurring subjects include desert landscapes, food, vehicles, potted plants, insects, household objects and other elements of ordinary American life.

== Publications ==
McKimens's publications include The Drips (PictureBox, 2006), This Kind of Livin' (Nieves, 2008) and Names of Numbers I (NERO Editions, 2013). In 2024 he contributed the essay "Sacred Clown of the Downtown" to The Brooklyn Rail's memorial issue for Donald Baechler.
