= Hildegard Hammerschmidt-Hummel =

Hildegard Hammerschmidt-Hummel (January 21, 1944 – May 24, 2024) was a German professor of English, literary critic, Shakespeare scholar and writer who claims to have found conclusive answers to many of the unresolved problems of Shakespeare's life and literary career using trans-disciplinary research methods. Among the answers she claims to have found are Shakespeare's religion, the identity of the 'Dark Lady' of his sonnets, and the authentic portraits.

== Background ==
Hammerschmidt-Hummel studied at the University of Marburg, earning her PhD in English literature in 1972. After her habilitation at the University of Mainz in 1977, she was granted the venia legendi and has been teaching English literature and cultural studies at the two universities since then. From 1979 to 1982, she served as Consul for Cultural Affairs at the German consulate general in Toronto. From 1982 to 2005, Professor Hammerschmidt-Hummel was the senior research scholar and editor of the Shakespeare Illustration project, the archives of which she greatly enlarged after the founder of the archive, Professor Horst Oppel, died in 1982.

== Criticism ==
Hammerschmidt-Hummel's work has drawn some criticism. Tarnya Cooper of the National Portrait Gallery in London stated that Hammerschmidt-Hummel's views are based on a "fundamental misunderstanding of visual art".

== Publications ==
- The Life and Times of William Shakespeare, 1564-1616. London: Chaucer Press, 2007
- The True Face of William Shakespeare: The Poet's Death Mask and Likenesses from Three Periods of His Life. London: Chaucer Press, 2006
- Die Shakespeare-Illustration (1594-2000) (Shakespearian illustrations, 1594 to 2000). Wiesbaden: Harrassowitz Verlag, 2003, 3 vols.
- Die verborgene Existenz des William Shakespeare: Dichter und Rebell im katholischen Untergrund (The Hidden Life of William Shakespeare: Poet and Rebel in the Catholic Underground). Freiburg im Breisgau: Verlag Herder, 2001.
- Das Geheimnis um Shakespeares 'Dark Lady': Dokumentation einer Enthüllung (The Secret Surrounding Shakespeare's Dark Lady: Uncovering a Mystery). Darmstadt: Wissenschaftliche Buchgesellschaft und Primus Verlag, 1999.
