= Scott Eaton (artist) =

American artist, designer, and photographer

- Website: http://www.scott-eaton.com/

Scott Eaton is an American artist and photographer. His work explores the representation of the human figure through various mediums – drawing, sculpture, photography, and machine learning. Eaton received masters degree from the MIT Media Lab, the Royal College of Art, and studied academic drawing and sculpture in Florence, Italy.

Eaton is an artist in the field of digital sculpture and his work combines human anatomy and traditional sculpture techniques with the power of modern digital tools. Eaton worked for many years as a visual effects artist and instructor, his clients included for Pixar, Disney, Sony, Microsoft, Warner Bros. In recent years he has focused on creative technology, anatomy, and art, collaborating on project with artists and institutions including Jeff Koons, Mark Wallinger, Elton John, the Royal Academy, the BBC, and the London Science Museum.

On 14 September 2014, his statue of Amy Winehouse was unveiled at the Stables Market in Camden Town, north London. Eaton said the statue was meant to capture her "attitude and strength, but also give subtle hints of insecurity."

Eaton lives and works in London.
