= Markus Brüderlin =

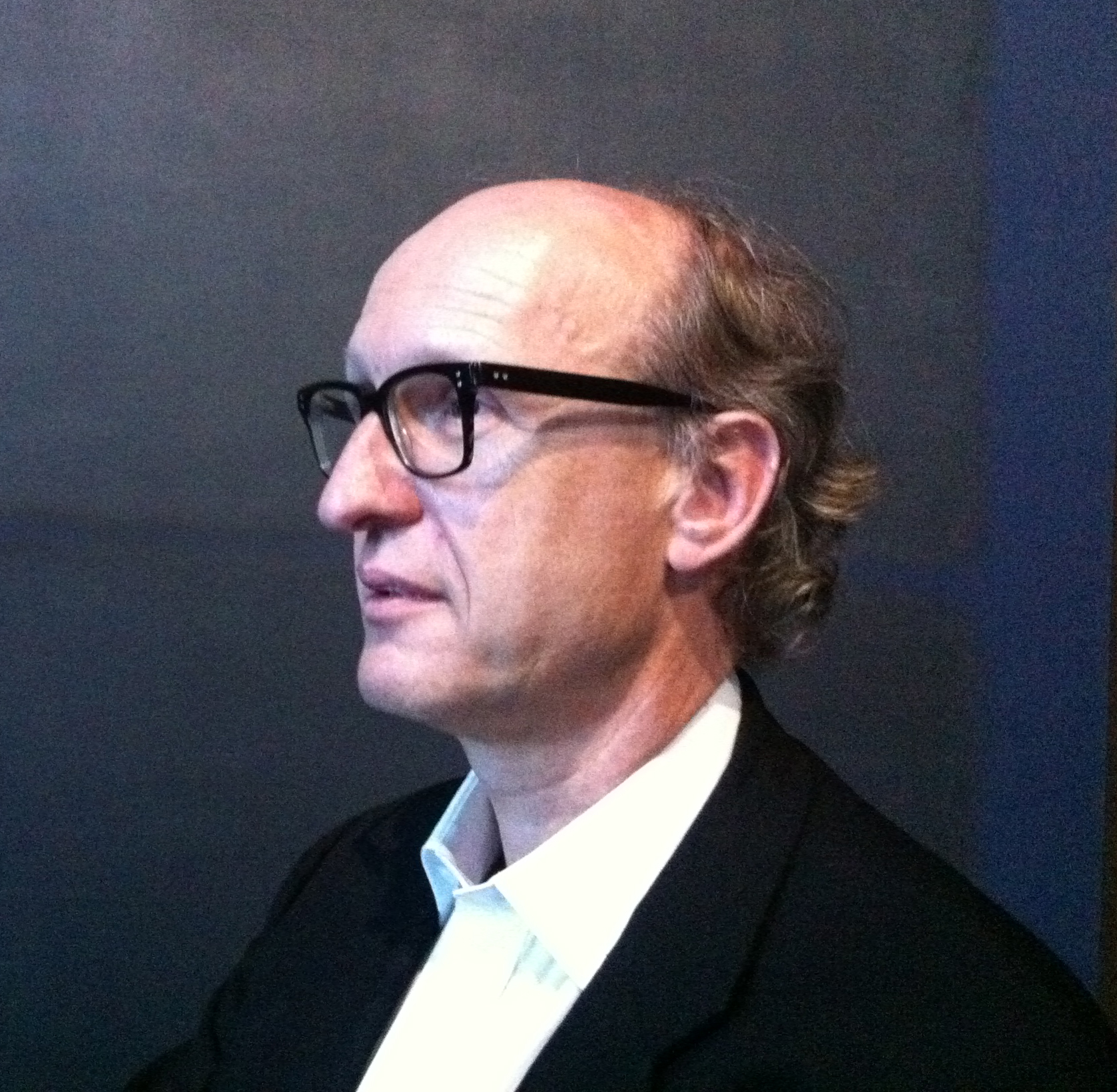
Markus Brüderlin in May 2012.

Markus Brüderlin (Basel, 15 May 1958 – Frankfurt am Main, Germany, 16 March 2014) was a Swiss art historian, curator and writer.

Brüderlin studied history of art and philosophy in Vienna. In 1996 he was appointed curator at the Fondation Beyeler in Basel. In 2006 he became director of the Kunstmuseum Wolfsburg.

Brüderlin died unexpectedly on 16 March 2014 at his home in Frankfurt, Hesse, Germany. He was 55 years old.

== Other websites ==
- Markus Brüderlin at the Kunstmuseum Wolfsburg website (in German)
