= Martin E. Sullivan =

- Born: Martin Edward Sullivan; February 9, 1944; Troy, New York, U.S.
- Died: February 25, 2014 (aged 70); Piney Point, Maryland, U.S.
- Occupation: Museum director

Martin Edward Sullivan (February 9, 1944 – February 25, 2014) was a museum director, and served as Director of the United States National Portrait Gallery, administered by the Smithsonian Institution, from 2008 to 2012.

Born in Troy, New York, Sullivan expanded the range of portraits commissioned by the gallery to include "notable Americans such as Eunice Kennedy Shriver and Alice Waters" in addition to portraits of Presidents and First Ladies. Upon retirement in 2012, Sullivan became a Senior Scholar at the Smithsonian.

Sullivan's other museum positions included Director of the Heard Museum, a Native American museum of art and culture in Phoenix, Arizona from 1990 to 1999, and Director of the New York State Museum from 1983 to 1990. Sullivan also served as Assistant Commissioner for Museums in New York's State Education Department.

Sullivan was a faculty member and history professor at St. Mary's College of Maryland.

Martin Sullivan died of renal failure on February 25, 2014, aged 70.

== See also ==
- David C. Ward
