= First World War centenary =

2014–2018 series of commemorations

- A remembrance poppy, used as a symbol of remembrance for the war in the United Kingdom and most Commonwealth nations.
- Date: 28 July 2014 – 11 November 2018
- Also known as: World War I centenary

The First World War centenary was the four-year period marking the centenary of the First World War, which began in mid-2014 with the centenary of the outbreak of the war, and ended in late 2018 with the centenary of the 1918 armistice.

== Participating countries ==
=== Australia ===
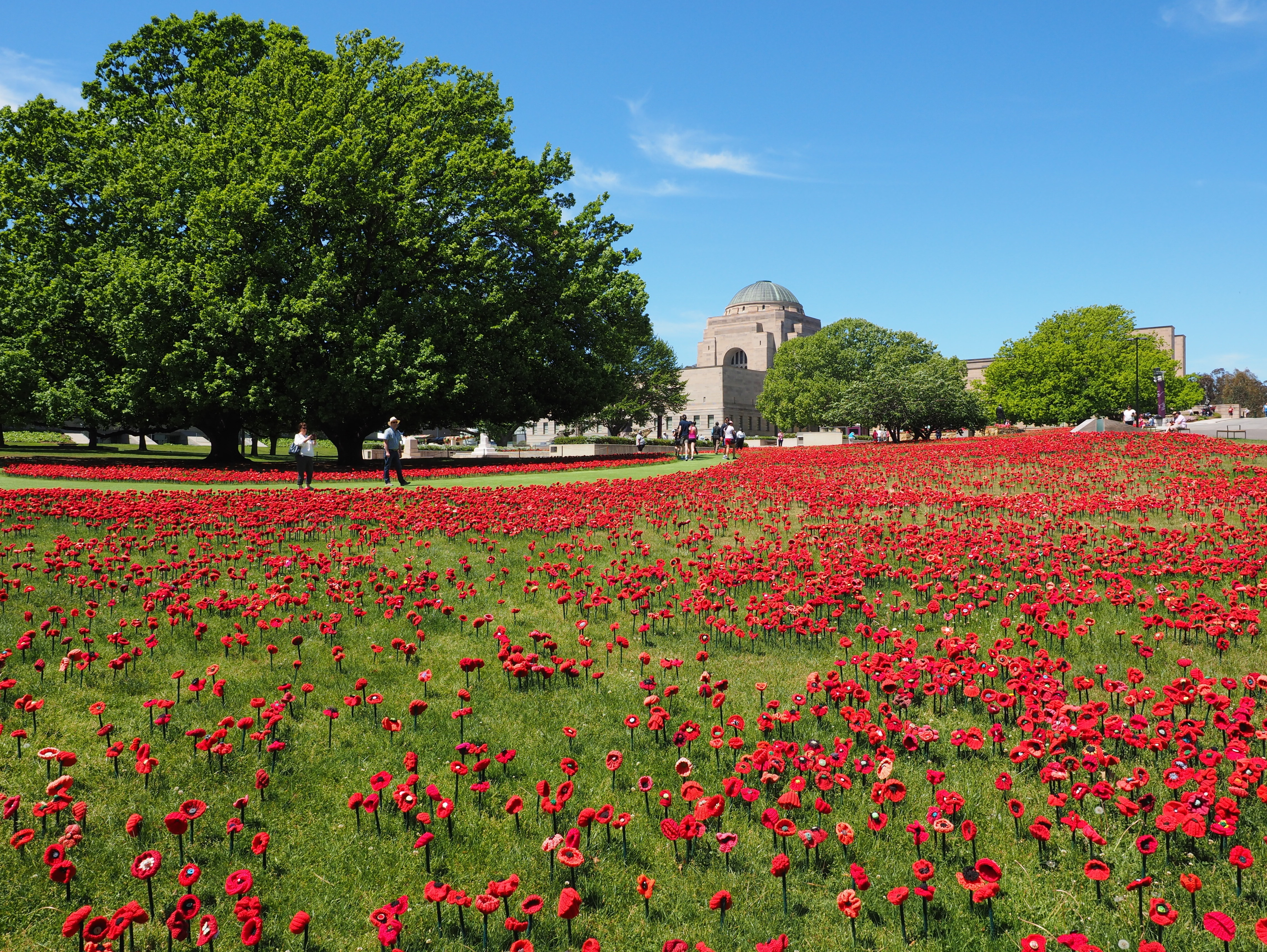
Part of the 62,000 Poppies Display which was exhibited at the Australian War Memorial from 5 October to 11 November 2018. Each poppy represents an Australian killed in World War I.

In Australia, the occasion is known as the Anzac Centenary. Committees planning the event included the National Commission on the Commemoration of the Anzac Centenary and the Anzac Centenary Advisory Board. The government had budgeted $83.5M for a seven-year programme which included commemorative events in Australia and overseas; educational activities and resources; and refurbishments of galleries and war graves. The Brisbane City Council has spent $13.4 million to refurbish the Shrine of Remembrance, Brisbane located in ANZAC Square and $1 million revitalising 31 suburban war memorials. Many commemorative events were organised by governments and other organisations. In 2015 the Australian Government committed a further $100M to the Anzac Centenary for the creation of the Sir John Monash Centre, unveiled on Anzac Day 2018. It is the Western Front's most expensive visitor centre. During the centenary of the First World War, Australia is said to have spent more than any other country put together to celebrate the Anzacs.

=== Belgium ===
The centenary of World War I was marked by a program of exhibition, lectures and academic research focusing on the theme of Belgian involvement in the conflict and the occupation. The Royal Museum of the Armed Forces and Military History in Brussels hosted an exhibition titled "Expo 14–18: It's Our History" from 2014 to 2015.

=== Bosnia and Herzegovina ===
The city of Sarajevo, where the assassination of Archduke Franz Ferdinand took place, organized a commemoration in the period 21–28 June 2014. The event was named "Sarajevo, heart of Europe".

Filmmaker Emir Kusturica announced an initiative to hold a ceremony on 28 June 2014, in which a re-trial of Gavrilo Princip would be started. The motivation behind the initiative was that Austria-Hungary never ratified the annexation of Bosnia and Herzegovina, and that a verdict of high treason therefore should be considered illegal. Kusturica said the assassination of Ferdinand by Princip was "a political murder, but definitely not high treason. If Princip was convicted of murder, it wouldn't have been possible to sentence him to lifetime imprisonment". Furthermore, he planned to exhibit letters written by Oskar Potiorek, arguing that they proved that a war was planned long before the Sarajevo assassination.

=== Canada ===
National commemorations were organized on 4 August 2014 to mark the beginning of the war, and on 11 November 2018 to mark its ending.

=== Czech Republic ===
The Czech Radio ran several social media accounts commemorating events during World War I day-by-day. That was accompanied by a special website with an archive of radio programmes with stories from World War I.

The Czech Republic was part of Austria-Hungary.

=== Denmark ===
The cultural network "Golden Days" planned a commemoration in September 2014, "1914, the Gateway to Modern Europe".

Denmark remained neutral during World War I and did not take part in the warfare. The biggest event from a Danish perspective is the reunification with Northern Schleswig (Sønderjylland) in 1920. After the Second War of Schleswig in 1864, Denmark was forced to cede Schleswig and Holstein to Prussia. In 1918, the Versailles powers offered to return the region of Schleswig-Holstein to Denmark. After the Schleswig Plebiscites Northern Schleswig (Sønderjylland) was recovered by Denmark in 1920. The reunion day (Genforeningsdag) is celebrated every 15 June on Valdemarsdag.

=== France ===
In France, the government carried out a policy of national remembrance. An early start was made in 2011 with the opening of Le Musée de la Grande Guerre ("The Museum of the Great War") in Meaux on Armistice Day. France set up an official board for the commemoration of the centenary under the name of Mission du Centenaire.

A war memorial, entitled L'Anneau de la mémoire ("Ring of Memory"), was opened on 11 November 2014 in Ablain-Saint-Nazaire. It is the first major memorial to list casualties in alphabetical order without regards to nationality or rank.

At the end of the commemorations, the first edition of the Paris Peace Forum, a concept initiated by Justin Vaïsse and Pascal Lamy and endorsed by President Emmanuel Macron, opened to mark the centenary of the 1918 armistice. Since then, the forum is held annually in November, opening on or around Armistice Day.

=== Ireland ===
The centenary of the First World War was marked in Ireland. A cross of sacrifice was erected in Glasnevin in Dublin, which also included a joint Irish-British commemoration ceremony. A season of First World War programmes was also broadcast on RTÉ.

=== Kenya ===
The Centenary commemorations were marked primarily in Taita Taveta County, with events starting from 16 August 2014 and going on for another five years. Kenya, known as British East Africa during World War I, borders Tanzania, then known as German East Africa. Taita Taveta County was therefore the site of several important battles in what was known as the East African Campaign of World War I. The German Schutztruppe occupied Taveta and built fortified outposts with an intention of blocking the British from using the Voi-Taveta Railway. Major battle sites and commemoration locations include:

- The German outpost on Salaita Hill where a big battle was fought on 12 February 1916, followed by a German retreat towards the Kenya-Tanzania border.
- Latema and Rianta Hills where a major battle was fought between 12 and 16 March 1916, the final World War I battle in British colonial territory.
- Mile 27 on the Voi-Maktau Railway
- Fortifications at Maktau
- Mashoti Fort
- Mbuyuni

Commemorations also took place at the Voi, Maktau and Taveta Commonwealth War Graves. The commemorations were held in conjunction with the National Museums of Kenya, the Commonwealth War Graves Commission and the Kenya Wildlife Service.

=== New Zealand ===
New Zealand government agencies and other organisations worked together on commemorations to mark the centenary, which was entitled as WW100. The commemorations were led by the Minister for Arts, Culture and Heritage, Maggie Barry. A WW100 Programme Office was established by the Ministry for Culture and Heritage along with the Ministry of Foreign Affairs and Trade, the New Zealand Defence Force and the Department of Internal Affairs.

New Zealand's centenary commemorations honoured those who fought, but also told the stories of the people who remained at home. $17 million in lottery funding has been allocated by the Lottery Grants Board to commemorate the First World War Centenary.

The New Zealand Government's key centenary projects included the development of the Pukeahu National War Memorial Park in Wellington, an education/interpretation centre at the National War Memorial, a series of new histories, and the Ngā Tapuwae New Zealand First World War Trails in Gallipoli and along the Western Front.

A First World War Centenary Panel was established, chaired by Brian Roche of New Zealand Post. The Panel's role was to advocate for the centenary, attract sponsorship or philanthropic support for centenary projects, coordinate with any equivalent bodies overseas, particularly Australia; and provide advice to the government on the centenary commemorations. Dame Anne Salmond, Bob Harvey, Dr Monty Soutar, Matthew Te Pou and Sir Peter Jackson were all involved.

Several media commentators have criticized different aspects of the official Centenary commemorations. Professor Bryce Edwards noted on 24 April 2015: "As the nation moves into commemorating the Anzac Day centenary, there are growing signs of WWI overload and fatigue."

=== Turkey ===
Official Anzac Day commemorations were held in Gallipoli, Turkey, over two days beginning on 25 April 2015 to mark the 100th anniversary of the Gallipoli landing. The commemoration was attended by the following leaders:

- Kamalesh Sharma, Commonwealth Secretary-General
- David Cameron, Prime Minister of the United Kingdom
- Tony Abbott, Prime Minister of Australia
- John Key, Prime Minister of New Zealand
- Recep Tayyip Erdoğan, President of Turkey

A service was held during the dawn of 25 April to remember fallen soldiers.

=== United Kingdom ===
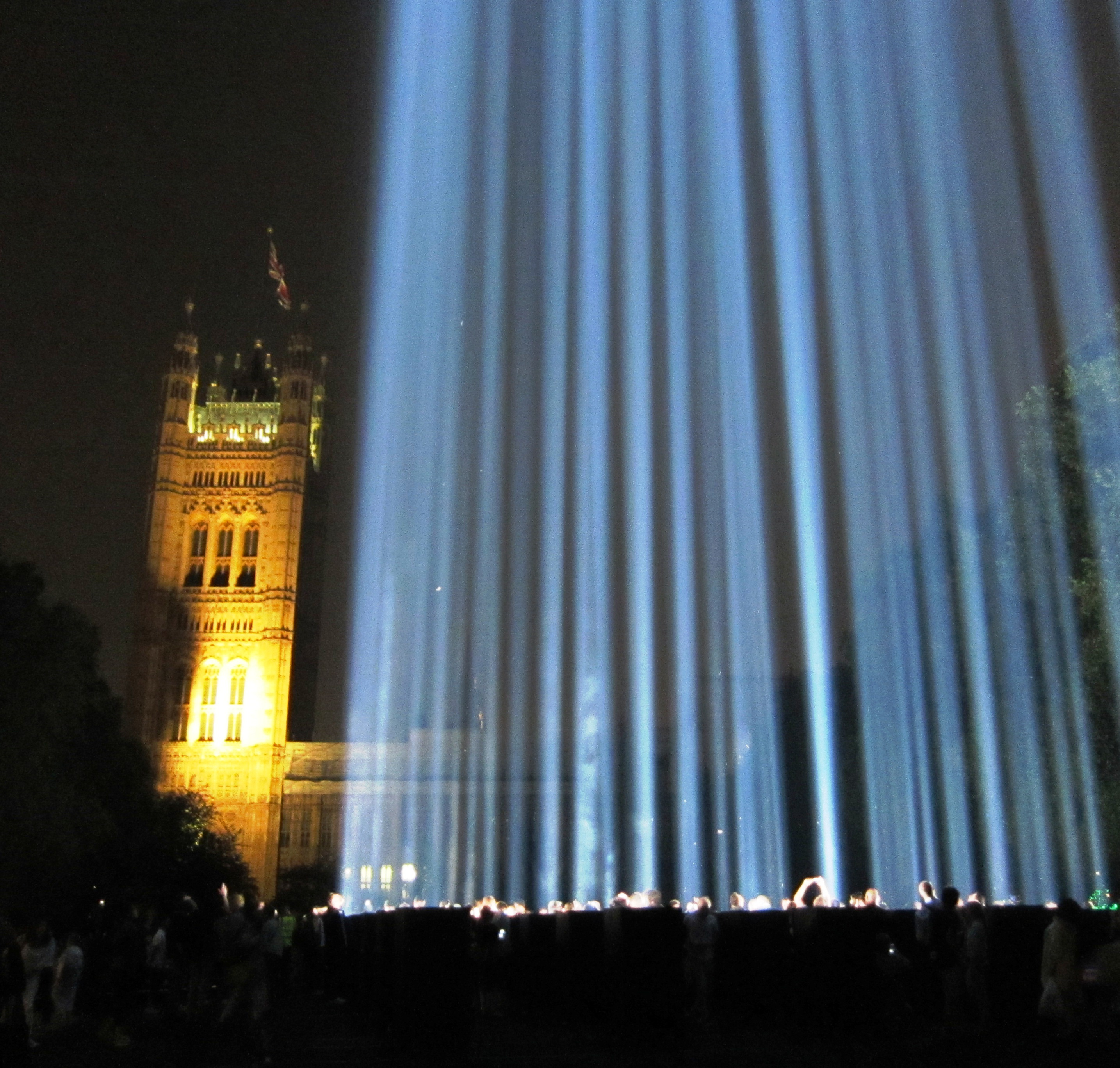
In the UK, lights were turned out to recall the start of the war when "the lamps are going out". Afterwards, a tower of light shone across London for a week.

In the United Kingdom, the Imperial War Museum (IWM) led a national programme of commemorative events and planned new galleries for the occasion (www.1914.org). In May 2010 the museum launched its First World War Centenary Partnership Programme. Partner organisations receive access to IWM collections objects and expertise, and to digital resources, branding and a collaborative extranet. By November 2011, 330 national and international organisations had become partners. The museum also opened a new permanent First World War gallery at its London branch on 19 July 2014, as part of a £35 million redevelopment of the building.

In November 2011, it was announced that Prime Minister David Cameron had appointed Andrew Murrison MP as his special representative for First World War centenary commemorations. On 11 October 2012, Cameron announced £50 million to fund national centenary commemorations. The anniversaries of Britain's declaration of war on Germany, the opening of the Battle of the Somme, the Battle of Jutland, and the November 1918 Armistice were planned to be marked by national commemorations. The redevelopment of the Imperial War Museum, where Cameron delivered his speech, will be supported by an additional £5 million. A further £5.3 million will fund visits to Western Front battlefields by pupils from English schools. The Heritage Lottery Fund will provide £15 million to community projects, led by young people, to conserve local heritage associated with the war. In addition the preservation of the former Royal Navy light cruiser HMS Caroline, which served at the Battle of Jutland, will be supported by a grant of up to £1 million.

The Heritage Lottery Fund provided funding to educational projects in fields such as local history, online access to museums and archives, youth heritage projects – such as the Great War Live archive site, which showcases the war day by day as it happens, family history, the preservation of war memorials, and the conservation of historic artefacts.

The BBC planned a First World War centenary season of around 2,500 hours of television, radio and online programming over four years. The programming included documentaries, drama, arts and music, commemorative programmes and programmes for children and schools.

On 14 January 2014, the National Archives released a first batch of digitised British Army war diaries. The same day, the National Archives, together with Imperial War Museums and Zooniverse launched 'Operation War Diary', a crowdsourcing project to tag data on each diary page.

The installation Blood Swept Lands and Seas of Red at the Tower of London, by Paul Cummins and Tom Piper, was especially popular — over five million people visited it before it closed in November 2014, with calls for it to be extended. Most of the ceramic poppies were sold to the public and special features from it have been preserved to go on tour and then be displayed in the Imperial War Museum. Artistic reception was mixed but the Queen praised the exhibit in her Christmas message and the artists were honoured in the new year. A similar tribute, Beyond the Deepening Shadow, in which 10,000 flames were lit, again at the Tower of London, and designed by Piper, was installed to mark the centenary of the end of the war. It ran nightly, ending on Armistice Day (11 November) 2018.

The Shrouds of the Somme was laid out at Queen Elizabeth Olympic Park from 8 to 18 November 2018 to commemorate the 72,396 servicemen from the British Commonwealth with no known grave recorded at Thiepval Memorial as missing presumed dead in the Battle of the Somme; the work comprises 72,396 small human figurines, each separately wrapped in a calico shroud which was cut and sewn by hand. All of them were held in the presence of about 2,000 invited guests.

=== United States ===
The United States World War I Centennial Commission was established in 2013. The Commission planned, developed, and executed programs, projects, and activities to commemorate the centennial of World War I. A large part of its mandate was to encourage private organizations and State and local governments to organize and participate in activities that commemorate the centennial of World War I and to facilitate and coordinate activities throughout the U.S. The commission also served as a "clearinghouse" for information about events and plans for commemoration.

== International organizations ==
=== European Broadcasting Union (EBU) ===
The European Broadcasting Union (EBU) organised a concert in Sarajevo with the Vienna Philharmonic Orchestra. It took place in a library that had recently been renovated following the destruction wrought by the Yugoslav conflict, and which is adjacent to the site of the assassination of Archduke Franz Ferdinand, which triggered the war.

In 2018, the EBU oversaw a 'Concert for Peace' produced by two of its members, France Télévisions and Zweites Deutsches Fernsehen (ZDF), held at the Royal Opera of Versailles and again performed by the Vienna Philharmonic Orchestra, for the purpose of commemorating the centenary of the end of the war.

=== European Union ===
The European Union marked the occasion with a gathering of leaders of the 28 EU member states in Ypres, during which they stood together at the Menin Gate while the Last Post was played. A minute of silence was also held for the fallen.

=== Europeana ===
Europeana had three digital projects to commemorate the First World War across Europe. A range of materials was freely available on the web.

- Europeana Collections 1914–1918, which made available 425,000 items from European libraries.
- Europeana 1914–1918, which digitized and made available stories and objects brought to collection days across Europe.
- EFG1418, the European Film Gateway collection of films and related documents from the war.

=== Red Cross ===
The Red Cross had an archive of records about the twenty million soldiers that were captured or buried by other countries. It planned to put all these paper records online for the centenary.
