= Centenary of the outbreak of World War I =

World War I commemorations in 2014

- Part of the First World War centenary
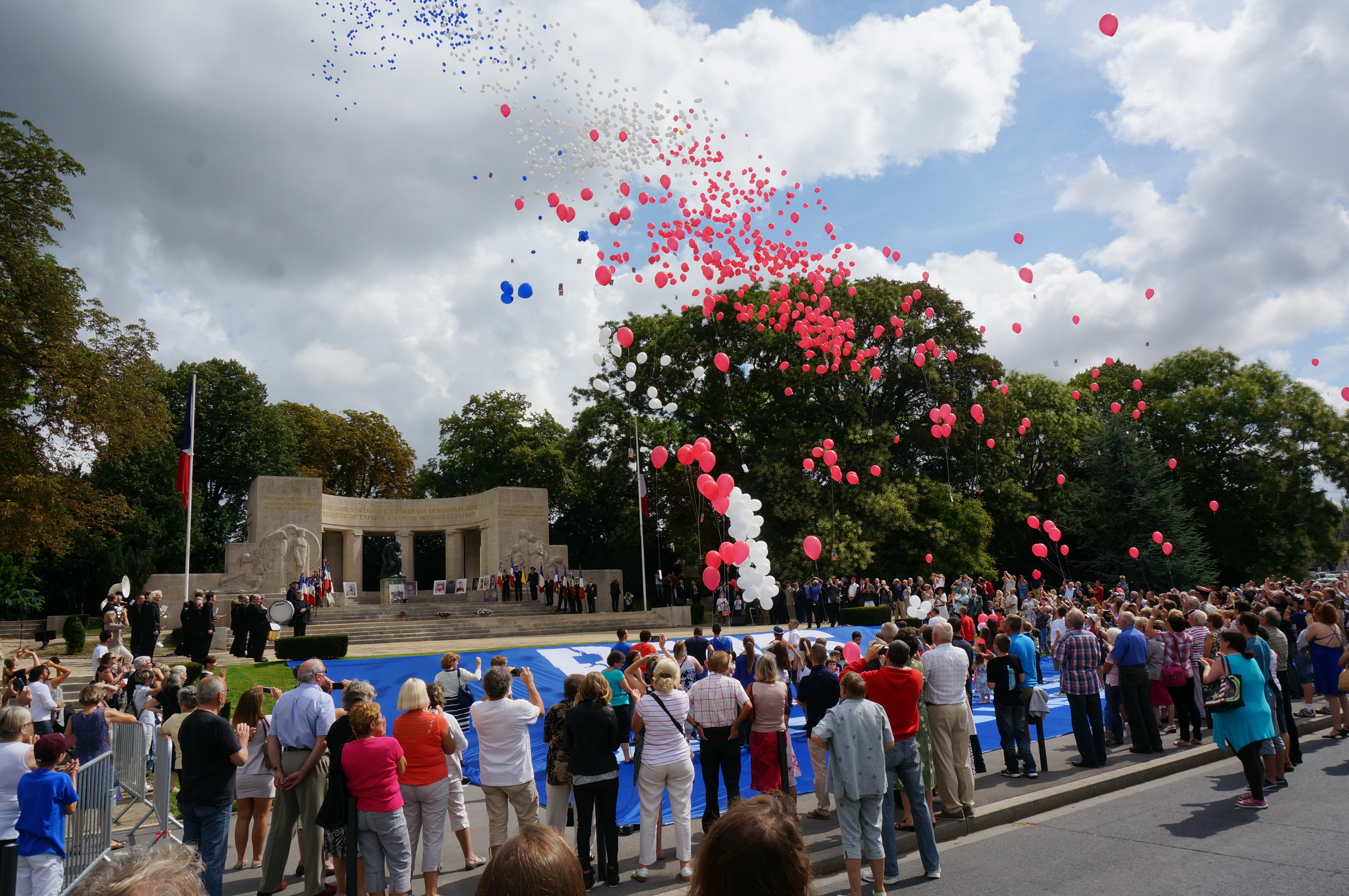
- Balloon release at the Reims War Memorial in the Place de la République.
- Date: 28 July – 4 August 2014

The centenary of the outbreak of World War I occurred in the summer of 2014, with events in several European and Commonwealth countries. It marked the beginning of a wider four year centenary period commemorating the war.

== Background ==
The July Crisis, which occurred after the assassination of Archduke Franz Ferdinand, had culminated in Austria-Hungary declaring war on the Kingdom of Serbia, which Austria-Hungary blamed for the assassination, on 28 July 1914. Over the following days and weeks, this action and the invasion of Luxembourg and Belgium by the German Empire led to a succession of other declarations of war that drew the major European powers into a worldwide conflict.

== Hartmannswillerkopf ==
On 3 August 2014, the centenary of Germany's declaration of war on France was marked by French President François Hollande and German President Joachim Gauck, who together laid the first stone of a new joint memorial at Hartmannswillerkopf for French and German soldiers killed in the war. Over 30,000 soldiers from both sides died in the fighting here at the Battle of Hartmannswillerkopf. The site, in the Vosges mountains of Alsace in France, is the location of a cemetery and a crypt containing the ashes of 12,000 unknown soldiers. The presidents observed a minute's silence in the crypt.

== Canadian events ==
The centenary of the First World War was commemorated in Canada on 3 August 2014, the date of the German declaration of war on France. A wreath-laying ceremony was held at the National War Memorial, before continuing at the Canadian War Museum. During the ceremony, Prime Minister Stephen Harper announced the permanent extension of the Ceremonial Guard's sentry hours, from Vimy Ridge Day to Remembrance Day.

Other tributes were also held in Halifax, where lights were shut off at major landmarks, and an ecumenical service at the Basilica of St. John the Baptist in St. John's. The event was also commemorated in Toronto in an event organised by the tourism office for Flanders, where a group of men in newsboy costumes distributed fictitious historical newspaper describing the major events of the war. The centenary of the war was also the theme of the 93rd annual Warrior's Day Parade, held on 10 August at Toronto's Canadian National Exhibition.

== Allied memorial at Liège ==
On the morning of 4 August 2014, leaders and representatives of 83 countries gathered at the Interallied Memorial of Cointe on the outskirts of Liège to commemorate the invasion of Belgium by Germany and the Battle of Liège. Representing Belgium were Philippe, King of the Belgians and Queen Mathilde, together with the Presidents of France and Germany, François Hollande and Joachim Gauck. Representatives were present from the United Kingdom, the United States, Spain, Italy, Ireland, Serbia, Romania and the European Commission. Speeches were given by King Philippe, Hollande, Gauck, and Prince William, Duke of Cambridge. The commemoration culminated in the laying of a wreath of white roses at the memorial by King Philippe.

== Saint Symphorien cemetery ==
On the evening of 4 August 2014, a commemorative event was held at St Symphorien cemetery in Belgium. Originally built by the Germans during the war, and containing both German and British graves, this cemetery is now maintained by the Commonwealth War Graves Commission. The commemorative event here marked the losses at the Battle of Mons. Those attending the event and ceremony included King Philippe and Queen Mathilde representing Belgium. Representing the United Kingdom were Prince William, Catherine, Duchess of Cambridge and Prince Harry. Politicians present included German President Joachim Gauck, Belgian Prime Minister Elio Di Rupo, and British Prime Minister David Cameron. Also present was Justin Welby, the Archbishop of Canterbury. The event was broadcast on television by the British Broadcasting Corporation, with narration by historian Dan Snow, accompanied with readings, music and poetry about the history of the war. Wreath-laying and a silence was followed by the playing of The Last Post.

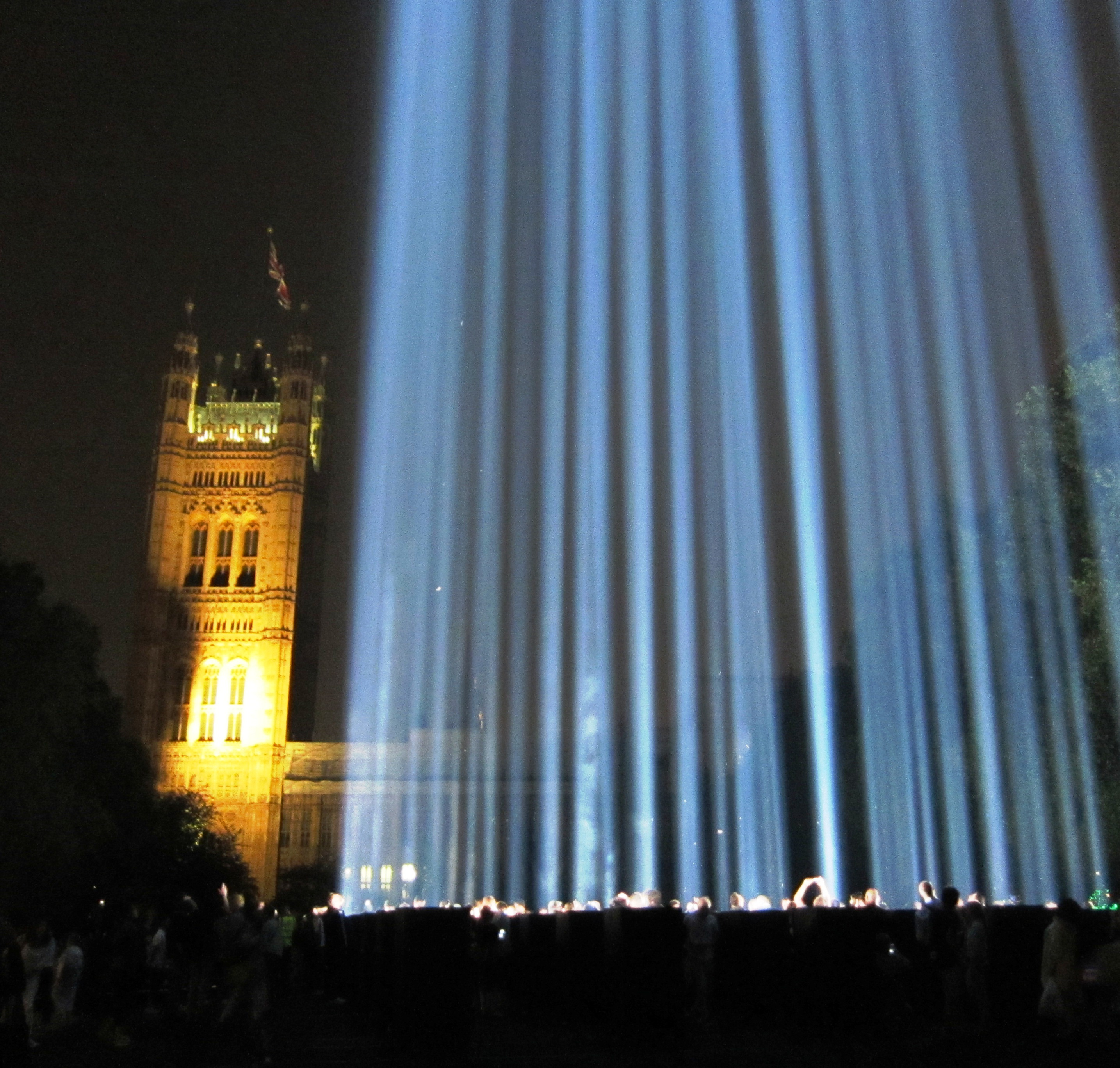
Spectra display in London at the Victoria Tower Gardens

== Westminster Abbey ==
The final event of commemoration on 4 August 2014 was held in London at Westminster Abbey, with a service and a candlelit vigil. This was part of the 'Lights Out' event inspired by the words of Sir Edward Grey, foreign secretary during the outbreak of the war: "The lamps are going out all over Europe; we shall not see them lit again in our lifetime." Those present at the service included Camilla, Duchess of Cornwall, the Deputy Prime Minister Nick Clegg and Labour leader Ed Miliband. The culmination of the service was a vigil at the Tomb of The Unknown Warrior. Part of the same 'Lights Out' event was the Spectra installation, with 49 beams of light rising above London from Victoria Tower Gardens to mark the centenary of the entry of Britain into the war.

== Tower of London ==
Between 5 August (the centenary of the first full day of the war) and 11 November (Remembrance Day) 2014 at the Tower of London, a ceramic poppy was planted for each British and Commonwealth soldier who died, making up the artwork titled Blood Swept Lands and Seas of Red.

== See also ==
- First World War centenary
- Centenary of the Armistice of 11 November 1918
