= Centenary of the Armistice of 11 November 1918 =

- Part of the First World War centenary
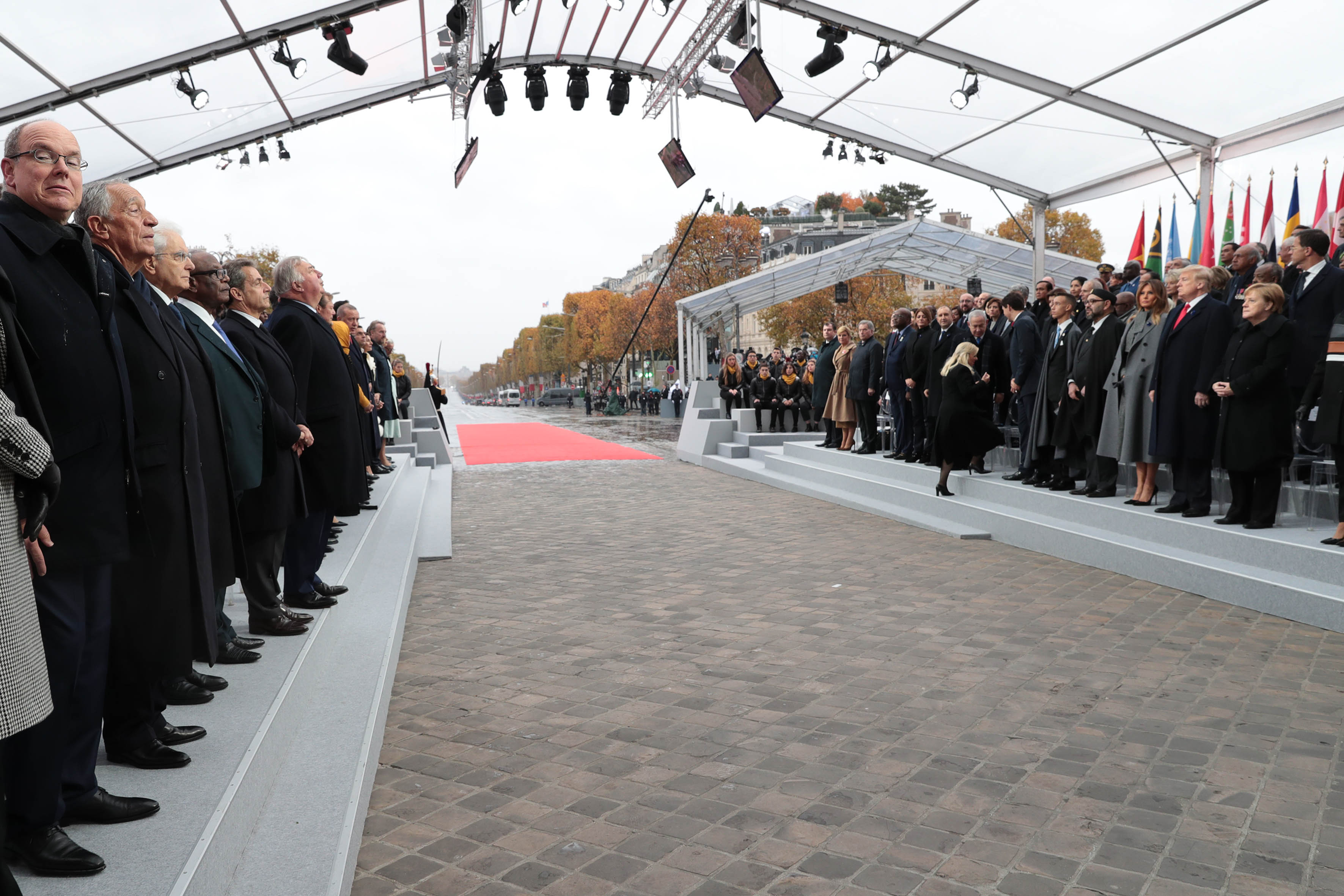
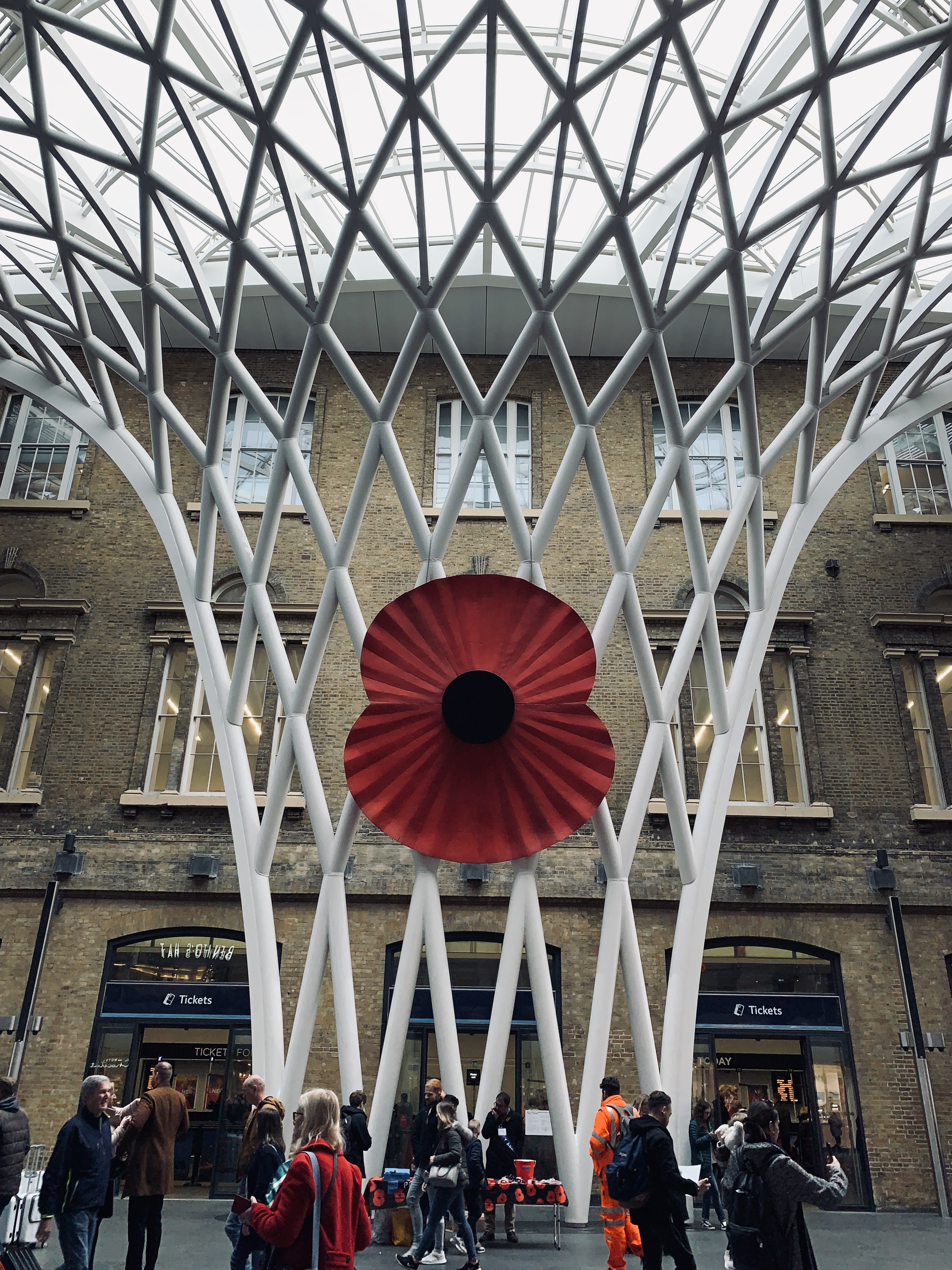
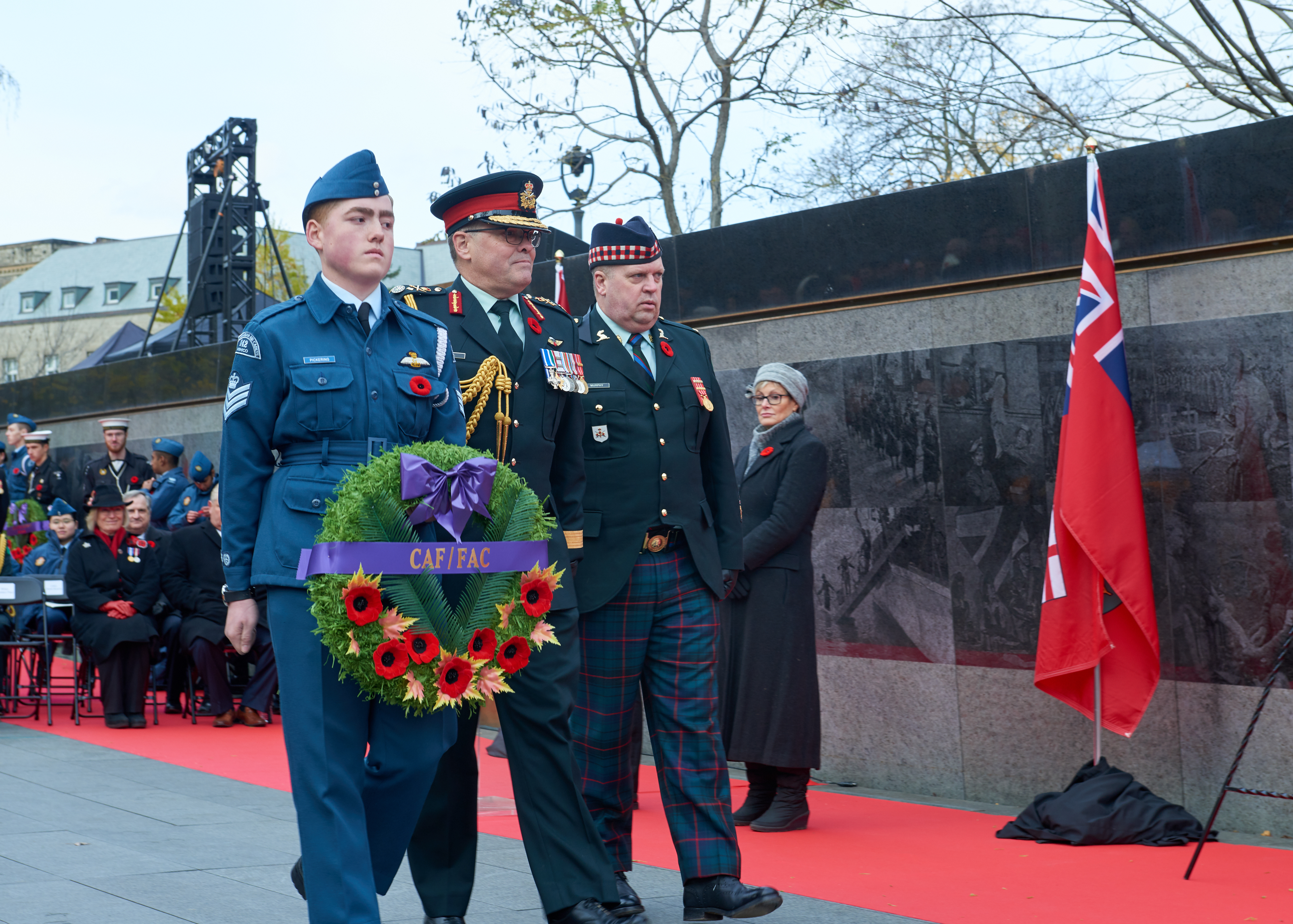
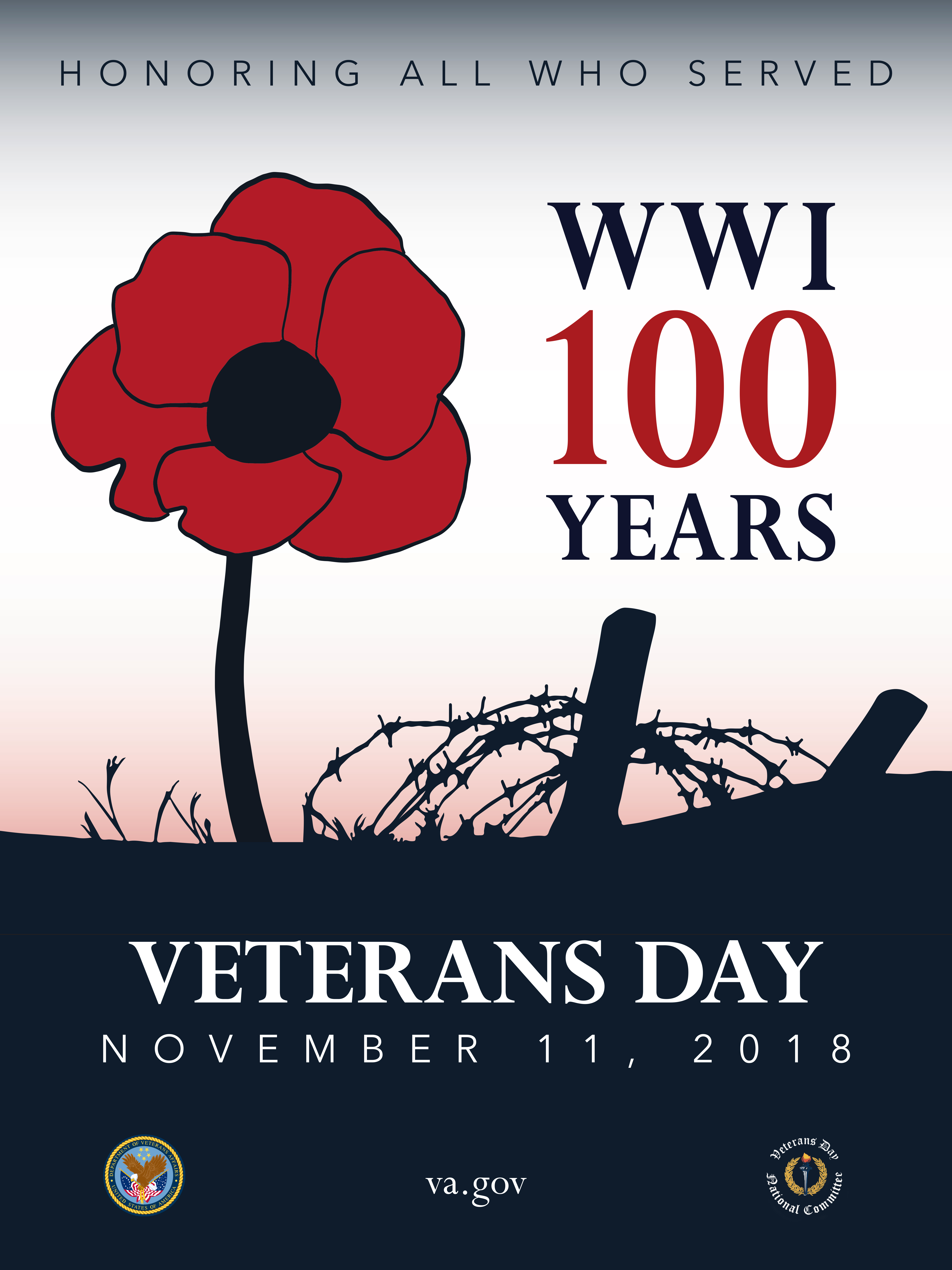
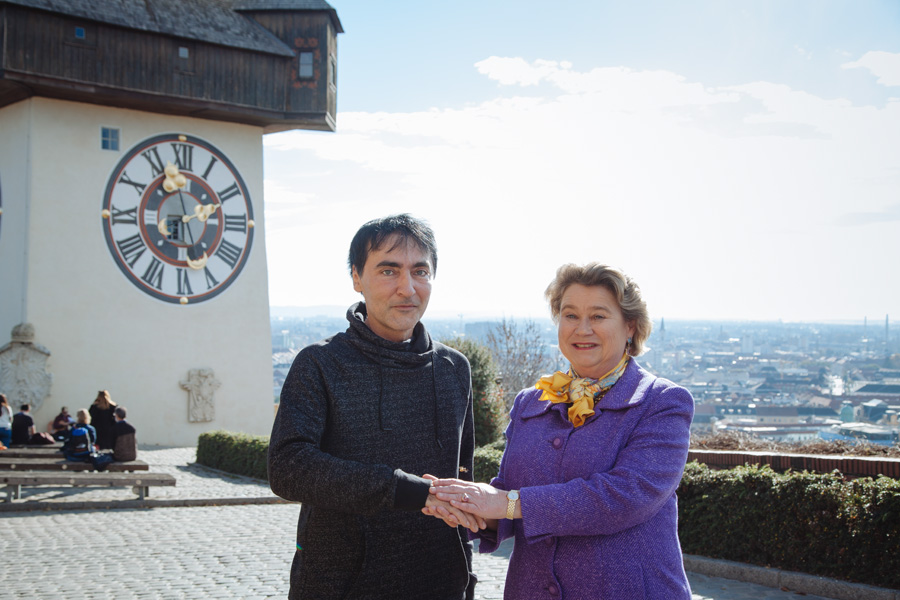
- Top to bottom, left to right: 1. World leaders at the Arc de Triomphe; 2. Remembrance Day ceremony in Toronto; 3. Commemorative exhibition at London King's Cross; 4. Poster for Veterans Day 2018; 5. Descendants of Gavrilo Princip and Archduke Franz Ferdinand shaking hands
- Date: 11 November 2018
- Location: International (major events in Europe, the United States and the Commonwealth)
- Organized by: National governments and institutions

The centenary of the Armistice of 11 November 1918 was the hundredth-year anniversary of the armistice which ended World War I, occurring on 11 November 2018. It marked the culmination of a wider four-year period commemorating the war itself, the First World War centenary.

In conjunction with the recurring annual holidays of Armistice Day, Remembrance Day and Veterans Day, numerous events were organised to mark the centenary. The French government arranged plans for an international ceremony and peace forum in Paris. Commemorations in the United Kingdom included a service of thanksgiving at Westminster Abbey and a visit by German president Frank-Walter Steinmeier. Other military and civilian events were organised elsewhere, including in key members of the Commonwealth which participated in the war, and across the world.

== Background ==
The Armistice of 11 November 1918 was signed near the French town of Compiègne, between the Allied Powers and Germany—represented by Supreme Allied Commander Ferdinand Foch and civilian politician Matthias Erzberger respectively—with capitulations having already been made separately by Bulgaria, the Ottoman Empire and Austria-Hungary. The agreements made by both sides included the cessation of all land and air hostilities on the Western Front. It was agreed upon at 5 am (Paris time) and came into effect later that morning at 11 am.

Formal peace negotiations only took place during the Paris Peace Conference in 1919 and 1920. With three extensions to the armistice having already been made, a state of peace was ratified with a series of treaties between the Allies and the former Central Powers, beginning with the Treaty of Versailles on 10 January 1920.

Following the end of the war, 11 November was designated a memorial day initially dedicated to the anniversary of the armistice and the military dead of World War I, known as Armistice Day. The first such observance took place in 1919. Following World War II, it was renamed under different titles in several countries (e.g. Remembrance Day in the Commonwealth and Veterans Day in the United States).

In the years leading up to the First World War centenary covering the period from 2014 to 2018, several national governments drafted plans to host commemorative events, beginning with the anniversary of the outbreak of World War I and also marking key dates of the war such as the Gallipoli campaign in 2015 and the battles of Verdun and the Somme in 2016.

== Planning ==
In 2017, the Bank of France announced it would release a 2 euro commemorative coin depicting the bleuet de France, the country's main war remembrance symbol. The official centenary programme in France was announced on 18 September 2018, during a press conference hosted by education minister Jean-Michel Blanquer and Geneviève Darrieussecq, secretary of state to the Minister of the Armed Forces. It included an international ceremony at the Arc de Triomphe followed by the inaugural edition of the newly founded Paris Peace Forum, plans which were already mentioned by French President Emmanuel Macron in a speech published in July. The government's Mission Centenaire committee was tasked with organising the events.

The UK government announced that it would allocate a £19 million package to mark the centenary, with an additional £10 million being added to the annual budget made to the Armed Forces Covenant Fund Trust, while individual local events were coordinated by the Imperial War Museum. The BBC planned a week-long series of dedicated programming across its platforms, as part of its World War I centenary season. The government of the Isle of Man, a Crown Dependency, also released a series of commemorative coins in advance of the centenary.

President Donald Trump proposed that a military parade at the Capitol be held on 10 November to mark the centenary, in admiration of France's Bastille Day military parade (which Trump attended as a guest in 2017). However, Trump cancelled the proposed event in August 2018 over cost concerns, with estimates that the parade would have cost as much as US$92 million.

== Centenary in France ==
=== Timeline ===
On 4 November 2018, Macron and his spouse Brigitte Macron hosted German president Frank-Walter Steinmeier at the Strasbourg Cathedral. Following a military ceremony, they attended a concert inside, conducted by the orchestra of the Académie supérieure de Strasbourg. The flags of France, the European Union and Germany were hoisted outside the cathedral.

Macron announced on 6 November that writer Maurice Genevoix, author of numerous books on the First World War, would be posthumously listed on the Panthéon in 2019, alongside fourteen other French civilians and soldiers who participated in World War I. In Reims, he and Malian president Ibrahim Boubacar Keïta opened a memorial for fallen colonial soldiers.

Throughout the course of the week leading up to the centenary, Macron visited symbolic Western Front locations across eleven departments in the north and east of the country. The visits were subjected to anger from local voters over what the Financial Times described as his "perceived metropolitan disregard for their pocketbook concerns."

The first international guests to arrive in Paris, among them German chancellor Angela Merkel, did so on 10 November. Around 10,000 police officers, gendarmes and soldiers were placed on duty in the lead up to the events. Merkel visited the Glade of the Armistice at Compiègne alongside Macron, where they laid a wreath, unveiled a plaque dedicated to Franco-German reconciliation and signed a book of remembrance in a replica of the railway carriage where the armistice was signed. The visit was symbolic as it marked the first time that French and German leaders had visited the site since 1945. An official reception dinner for invited guests took place in the evening at the Musée d'Orsay.

At 09:00 (CET) on 11 November, Macron began to receive dignitaries at the Élysée Palace for a brief reception before they departed to the Arc de Triomphe. At 11:00, church bells across metropolitan and overseas France rang simultaneously, marking the moment the armistice took effect a century earlier. The ceremony was nonetheless unable to begin until 11:19, after all dignitaries had gathered at the venue.

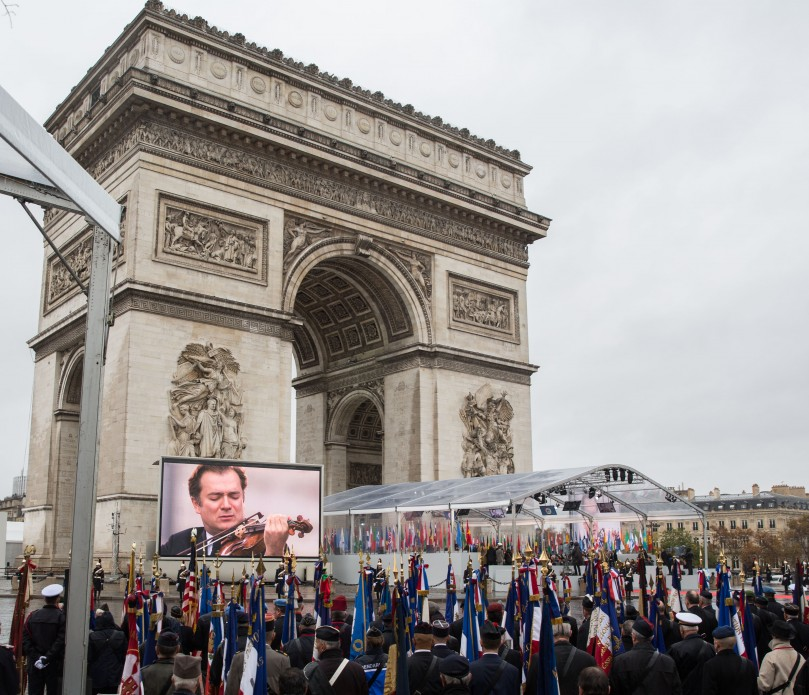
The Arc de Triomphe during the ceremony

Macron led a presidential inspection of troops, a roll call of French soldiers killed in the preceding year and an army choir rendition of the French national anthem. A performance of the sarabande from Bach's Suite No. 5 in C minor by cellist Yo-Yo Ma followed, and testimonies from witnesses to the armistice were intermittently read out by a group of teenage students. Ma also performed the second movement of Ravel's Sonata for Violin and Cello with French violinist Renaud Capuçon. Beninese musician Angélique Kidjo sang a variation of the song Blewu by Bella Bellow, in a nod to colonial troops. Macron delivered a keynote speech, denouncing nationalism as a "betrayal of patriotism". The European Union Youth Orchestra closed the ceremony with a performance of Ravel's Bolero. Macron rekindled the Tomb to the Unknown Soldier and laid a wreath, before the "Sonnerie aux morts" was played and a moment of silence observed, culminating in the "Cessez-le-feu" bugle call.

All international guests were invited to a luncheon at the Élysée Palace immediately after the ceremony, with spouses gathering at the Palace of Versailles.

The inaugural Paris Peace Forum was opened at the Grande halle de la Villette in the afternoon, with Macron, Merkel and United Nations Secretary-General António Guterres giving remarks at its plenary session. US president Donald Trump did not attend, instead visiting the Suresnes American Cemetery and Memorial as the forum took place, where he made an address before returning to the United States.

Also on 11 November, the European Broadcasting Union organised a concert at the Royal Opera of Versailles with performances by the Vienna Philharmonic, entitled the "Concert for Peace." During a concert in La Force, Dordogne, violinist Pierre Hamel from the Colonne Orchestra performed using a metal violin assembled by soldiers in the trenches. A series of religious memorial services were organised for the day, including an international mass at Notre-Dame de Paris, conducted by Archbishop Michel Aupetit.

=== Controversies ===
==== Philippe Pétain ====
Marshal Pétain, when he led France during the Second World War, was complicit in profound crimes which were recognized, and the responsibility of the French state was recognized. [...] I forgive nothing, but I erase nothing from our history.

— Emmanuel Macron

In October 2018, it was reported that tributes to war marshals at the Hôtel des Invalides would include one to Philippe Pétain, who served in the Battle of Verdun and later headed Nazi-aligned Vichy France. This led to criticism from French Jews, the opposition and on social media. In response, the office of the Élysée said it was not part of their official schedule and did not understand how Pétain "ended up" on the list. Macron himself described Pétain as a "great soldier", while remarking that he made "disastrous choices" during the Nazi occupation of France. The planned tribute was eventually withdrawn.

==== Placement of Serbian delegation ====
Serbian president Aleksandar Vučić was positioned away from the frontline seating areas in an area reserved for representatives of countries which were on the opposing side in the war or did not exist as separate states at the time. Serbia fought on the Allied side during the war, with the Army winning a crucial victory on the Salonica front, and Serbia's success had a pivotal role in forcing both Austria-Hungary and Bulgaria out of the war. Serbia lost over a quarter of its pre-war population, most of whom were civilians, which makes it the country with the largest losses in comparison to population numbers. In addition, the country has a long historical friendship with France. Therefore, Vučić's seating arrangement and the seating of the presidents of neighboring Croatia (which did not exist as a country at the time) and Kosovo (which Serbia does not recognize) on the same side as French president Emmanuel Macron led to anger from a large number of Serbs, who saw this as a great humiliation and a sign of disrespect for the Serbian victims of the war. The handling of the incident was also criticized in the French media, with Jean-Christophe Buisson of Le Figaro commenting that Serbia was unjustly humiliated.

A day later, the Monument of Gratitude to France in Belgrade's Kalemegdan Park was vandalized, with black X marks sprayed over the inscriptions on the monument. The vandalizing graffiti was later removed, and members of the city communal police patrolled the area for a few days. In addition, there were calls to rename streets in Belgrade named after France and Paris. The French ambassador to Serbia, Frédéric Mondoloni, later publicly apologized on television over the incident.

==== Trump's cancelled visit to the Aisne-Marne American Cemetery and Memorial ====
A planned visit by Trump to the Aisne-Marne American Cemetery and Memorial, scheduled for 10 November, was cancelled due to what the White House described as "bad weather". The decision was met with criticism, particularly from Ben Rhodes, a former national security advisor in the Obama administration; British Conservative politician Nicholas Soames, a grandson of Winston Churchill; and former secretary of state John Kerry. According to a 2020 article by The Atlantic, Trump had refused to attend and also described the cemetery as being "filled with losers". After the article was published, he called it "fake news".

==== Femen protests ====
Three Femen members staged a protest at the Arc de Triomphe on the morning of 10 November welcoming "war criminals", and were arrested by French police. In a later statement, the feminist activist group listed Trump, Russian president Vladimir Putin, Israeli prime minister Benjamin Netanyahu and Turkish president Recep Tayyip Erdoğan as examples of this description, along with Saudi crown prince Mohammed bin Salman, who was not invited. Femen also claimed responsibility for an incident on the day of the ceremony in which the motorcade carrying Trump passed by a topless woman who ran towards it and was then dragged out by French police. Anti-Trump demonstrations were held at the Place de la République during his visit.

=== Dignitaries ===
Over 120 foreign dignitaries attended the commemorations in Paris, including 72 heads of state and government and representatives of several international organisations. The French presidential office said it had invited representatives only from countries "which sent troops or workers to the European theaters of war".

On the eve of the centenary, Macron held a bilateral meeting with Trump at the Élysée Palace, which took place a day after Trump criticised European defence expenditures within NATO in response to Macron's suggestions for a continental European army. A similar meeting was planned between Trump and Russian president Vladimir Putin, but it was ultimately scrapped due to the forthcoming G20 Buenos Aires summit. Justin Trudeau, the prime minister of Canada, participated in separate commemorations at the Canadian National Vimy Memorial in northern France. Due to security concerns, Trump, Putin and Israeli prime minister Benjamin Netanyahu opted to use their own motorcades for the Arc de Triomphe ceremony, ultimately turning up late to the venue.

List of dignitaries at the 11 November 2018 armistice centenary in Paris

France

- Emmanuel Macron, President of France, and Brigitte Macron
  - Nicolas Sarkozy, former President of France (2007–2012)
- Édouard Philippe, Prime Minister of France
  - Édith Cresson, former Prime Minister (1991–1992)
  - Édouard Balladur, former Prime Minister (1993–1995)
  - Jean-Marc Ayrault, former Prime Minister (2012–2014)
- Florence Parly, Minister of the Armed Forces
- Geneviève Darrieussecq, Secretary of State to the Minister of the Armed Forces
- Christophe Castaner, Minister of the Interior
- Jean-Yves Le Drian, Minister of Europe and Foreign Affairs
- Gérard Larcher, President of the French Senate
- Richard Ferrand, President of the National Assembly
- Anne Hidalgo, Mayor of Paris
- Valérie Pécresse, President of the Regional Council of Île-de-France
- Jacques Toubon, French ombudsman

Other countries

- Ilir Meta, President of Albania
- Ahmed Ouyahia, Prime Minister of Algeria
- Nikol Pashinyan, Prime Minister of Armenia, and Anna Hakobyan
- Peter Cosgrove, Governor-General of Australia, and Lynne Cosgrove
- Alexander Van der Bellen, President of Austria, and First Lady Doris Schmidauer
- Elmar Mammadyarov, Minister of Foreign Affairs of Azerbaijan
- Tarique Ahmed Siddique, security adviser to Prime Minister Sheikh Hasina of Bangladesh
- Mikhail Myasnikovich, Speaker of the Council of the Republic of Belarus
- Charles Michel, Prime Minister of Belgium, and Amélie Derbaudrenghien
- Aurélien Agbénonci, Minister of Foreign Affairs and Cooperation of Benin
- Bakir Izetbegović, Chairman of the Presidency of Bosnia and Herzegovina
- Paulo César de Oliveira Campos, Ambassador of Brazil to France
- Rumen Radev, President of Bulgaria, and First Lady Desislava Radeva
- Roch Marc Christian Kaboré, President of Burkina Faso
- Chea Sophara, Deputy Prime Minister of Cambodia
- Justin Trudeau, Prime Minister of Canada
- Faustin-Archange Touadéra, President of the Central African Republic
- Idriss Déby, President of Chad, and First Lady Hinda Déby Itno
- Ji Bingxuan, Vice Chairperson of the Standing Committee of the National People's Congress of China
- Azali Assoumani, President of Comoros, and First Lady Ambari Assoumani
- Denis Sassou Nguesso, President of the Republic of the Congo, and First Lady Antoinette Sassou Nguesso
- Kolinda Grabar-Kitarović, President of Croatia, and First Gentleman Jakov Kitarović
- Nicos Anastasiades, President of Cyprus, and First Lady Andri Anastasiades
- Andrej Babiš, Prime Minister of the Czech Republic, and Monika Herodesová
- Lars Løkke Rasmussen, Prime Minister of Denmark
- Ismaïl Omar Guelleh, President of Djibouti
- Kersti Kaljulaid, President of Estonia
- Epeli Nailatikau, former President of Fiji
- Sauli Niinistö, President of Finland
- Régis Immongault, Minister for Foreign Affairs of Gabon (Note: Ali Bongo, Gabon's president, was unable to attend as initially planned after suffering a stroke.)
- Giorgi Margvelashvili, President of Georgia, and First Lady Maka Chichua
- Angela Merkel, Chancellor of Germany
- Alexis Tsipras, Prime Minister of Greece, and Peristera Baziana
- Alpha Condé, President of Guinea, and First Lady Djene Kaba Condé
- Pietro Parolin, Cardinal Secretary of State of the Holy See
- Guðni Th. Jóhannesson, President of Iceland
- Venkaiah Naidu, Vice President of India, and Second Lady M. Usha
- Leo Varadkar, Taoiseach of Ireland
- Benjamin Netanyahu, Prime Minister of Israel, and Sara Netanyahu
- Sergio Mattarella, President of Italy
- Alassane Ouattara, President of Ivory Coast, and First Lady Dominique Ouattara
- Tarō Asō, Deputy Prime Minister of Japan
- Jean Galiev, Ambassador of Kazakhstan to France
- Hashim Thaçi, President of Kosovo
- Dastan Jumabekov, Speaker of the Supreme Council of Kyrgyzstan
- Phankham Viphavanh, Vice President of Laos
- Raimonds Vējonis, President of Latvia
- Dalia Grybauskaitė, President of Lithuania
- Fayez al-Sarraj, Chairman of the Presidential Council and Prime Minister of Libya, and Nadia Refaat
- Henri, Grand Duke of Luxembourg, and Grand Duchess Maria Teresa
  - Xavier Bettel, Prime Minister of Luxembourg, and Gauthier Destenay
- Gjorge Ivanov, President of Macedonia, and First Lady Maja Ivanova
- Rivo Rakotovao, Acting President of Madagascar
- Ibrahim Boubacar Keita, President of Mali
- Carmelo Abela, Minister of Foreign and European Affairs of Malta
- Mohamed Ould Abdel Aziz, President of Mauritania, and First Lady Mariam Mint Ahmed Dit Tekber
- Igor Dodon, President of Moldova, and First Lady Galina Dodon
- Albert II, Prince of Monaco, and Princess Consort Charlene
- Milo Đukanović, President of Montenegro
- Mohammed VI, King of Morocco
  - Moulay Hassan, Crown Prince of Morocco
- Mark Rutte, Prime Minister of the Netherlands
- Winston Peters, Deputy Prime Minister of New Zealand, and Jan Trotman
- Mahamadou Issoufou, President of Niger, and First Lady Lalla Malika Issoufou
- Erna Solberg, Prime Minister of Norway
- Moin ul Haq, Ambassador of Pakistan to France
- Rami Hamdallah, Prime Minister of the Palestinian National Authority
- Jacek Czaputowicz, Minister of Foreign Affairs of Poland
- Marcelo Rebelo de Sousa, President of Portugal
- Klaus Iohannis, President of Romania, and First Lady Carmen Iohannis
- Vladimir Putin, President of Russia
- Macky Sall, President of Senegal
- Aleksandar Vučić, President of Serbia
- Andrej Kiska, President of Slovakia
- Borut Pahor, President of Slovenia
- Nosiviwe Mapisa-Nqakula, Minister of Defence and Military Veterans of South Africa
- Felipe VI, King of Spain
  - Pedro Sánchez, Prime Minister of Spain, and Begoña Gómez
- Stefan Löfven, Prime Minister of Sweden, and Ulla Löfven
- Alain Berset, President of the Swiss Confederation, and Muriel Zeender
- Shukurjon Zuhurov, Speaker of the Assembly of Representatives of Tajikistan
- Prayut Chan-o-cha, Prime Minister of Thailand, and Naraporn Chan-o-cha
- Beji Caid Essebsi, President of Tunisia
- Recep Tayyip Erdoğan, President of Turkey, and First Lady Emine Erdoğan
- Çary Nyýazow, Ambassador of Turkmenistan to France
- Petro Poroshenko, President of Ukraine, and First Lady Maryna Poroshenko
- The Lord Llewellyn of Steep, Ambassador of the United Kingdom to France
  - David Lidington, Chancellor of the Duchy of Lancaster (de facto deputy prime minister)
- Donald Trump, President of the United States, and First Lady Melania Trump
- Nigmatilla Yuldashev, Chairman of the Senate of Uzbekistan
- Tallis Obed Moses, President of Vanuatu, and First Lady Estella Moses
- Nguyên Thiêp, Ambassador of Vietnam to France

The following leaders travelled to Paris but only attended the Musée d'Orsay reception dinner:

- Saad Hariri, Prime Minister of Lebanon
- Muhammadu Buhari, President of Nigeria
- Sheikh Tamim bin Hamad Al Thani, Emir of Qatar

International organisations

- Moussa Faki, Chairperson of the African Union Commission
- Thorbjørn Jagland, Secretary General of the Council of Europe, and Hanne Grotjord
- Jean-Claude Juncker, President of the European Commission
- Antonio Tajani, President of the European Parliament, and Brunella Orecchio
- Michaëlle Jean, Secretary-General of the Organisation internationale de la Francophonie
- Guy Ryder, Director-General of the International Labour Organization
- Christine Lagarde, chair and managing director of the International Monetary Fund, and Xavier Giocanti
- Jens Stoltenberg, Secretary General of NATO, and Ingrid Schulerud
- José Ángel Gurría, Secretary-General of the OECD
- Audrey Azoulay, Director-General of UNESCO
- Paolo Artini, Representative to France of the United Nations High Commissioner for Refugees
- António Guterres, Secretary-General of the United Nations
- María Fernanda Espinosa, President of the United Nations General Assembly
- Roberto Azevêdo, Director-General of the World Trade Organization
- Jim Yong Kim, President of the World Bank Group

== Centenary in the United Kingdom ==
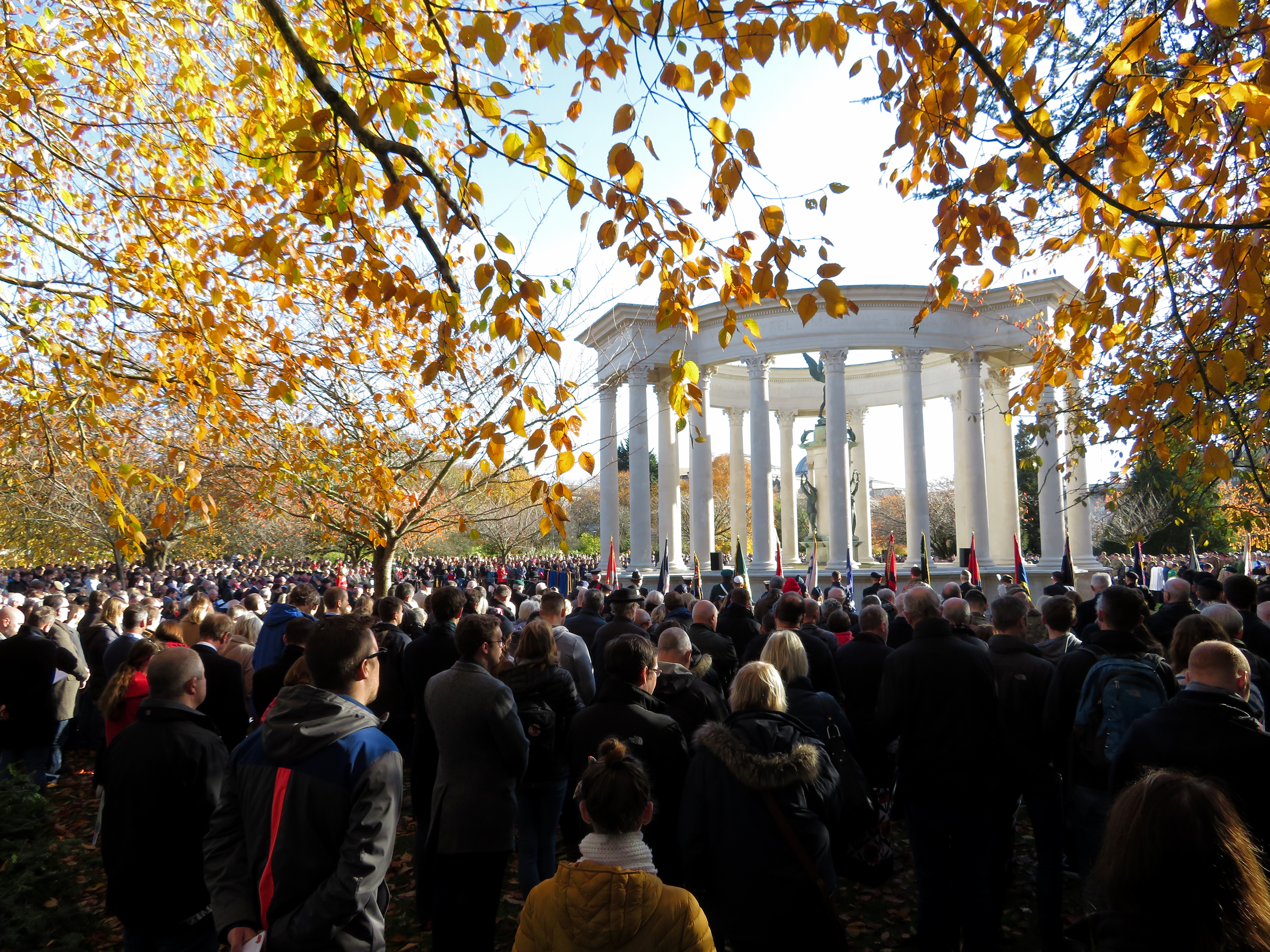
The National Service of Remembrance for Wales at the Welsh National War Memorial

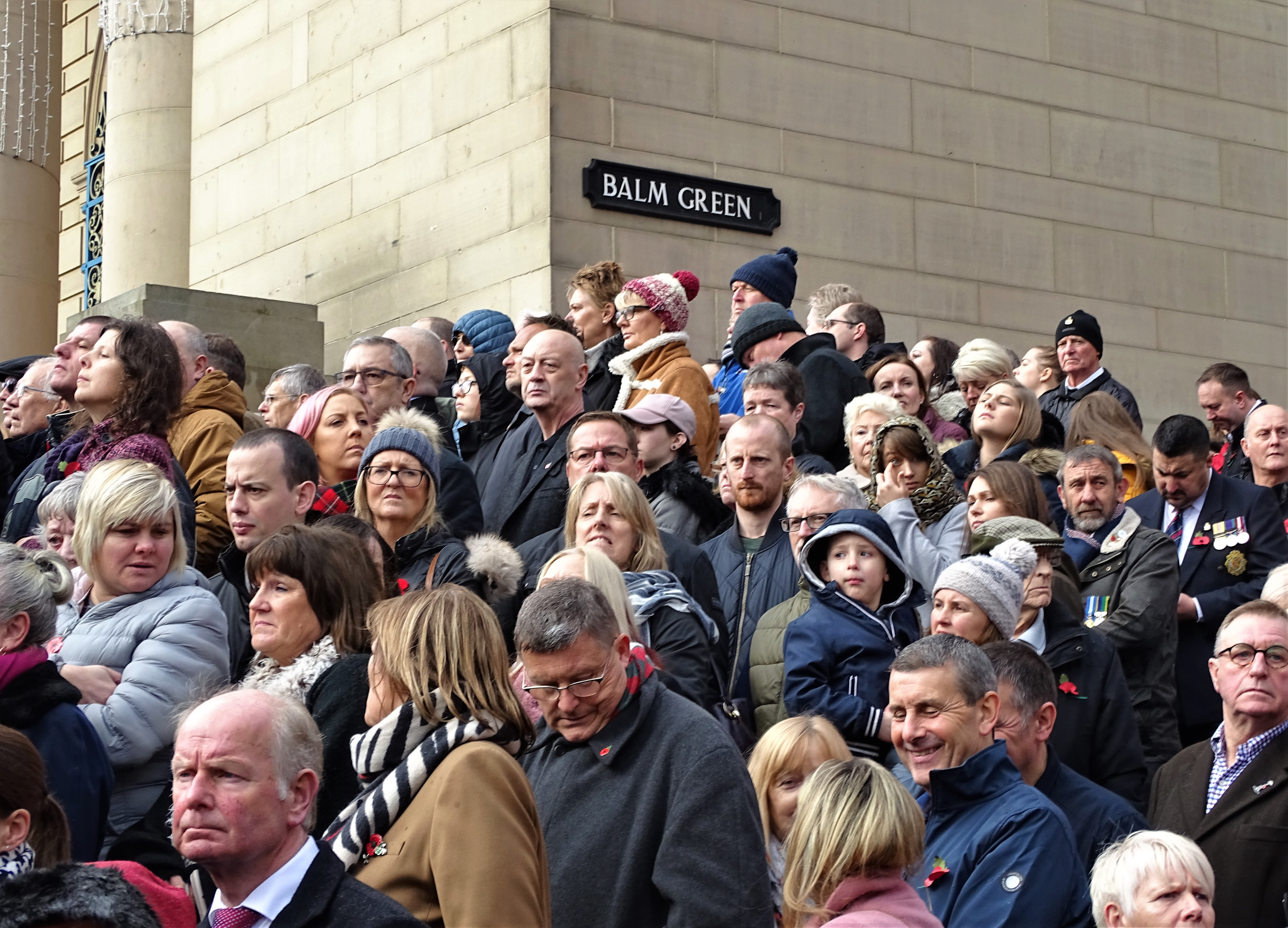
Members of the public during a service in Sheffield

Beginning on 5 November 2018, 10,000 torches were lit in the moat of the Tower of London, in an artistic exhibition entitled Beyond the Deepening Shadow which would repeat nightly until 11 November. The Shrouds of the Somme, designed by artist Rob Heard and comprising 72,396 shrouded figures representing all servicemen from the British Commonwealth with no known grave, was laid out at the Queen Elizabeth Olympic Park, being on display from 8 to 18 November 2018.

On 9 November, Prime Minister Theresa May visited the Thiepval Memorial in northern France and the St Symphorien Military Cemetery in Belgium, laying wreaths at the graves of John Parr and George Edwin Ellison, respectively the first and last British soldiers killed during the war. The wreaths were engraved with handwritten messages from May, invoking wartime poems to express gratitude to the dead for being "staunch to the end".

On 10 November, Queen Elizabeth II and other members of the royal family attended the annual Royal British Legion Festival of Remembrance at the Royal Albert Hall in London, which included performances by Sir Tom Jones and Sheridan Smith.

As Remembrance Sunday in 2018 fell on 11 November, the National Service of Remembrance occurred in tandem with other commemorative events in Europe. The service at the Cenotaph in London began at 11 am (GMT), with a two-minute silence being observed, after which the Prince of Wales then laid the first wreath on behalf of the Queen. Thousands were able to pay respect to relatives and soldiers killed in the war during a march past the memorial. Despite ongoing renovations, the Big Ben rang eleven times at 12:30 GMT. German president Frank-Walter Steinmeier was invited to attend as a special guest, becoming the first German representative to lay a wreath at the Cenotaph. The invitation was reportedly planned as early as September 2018. The Department for Digital, Culture, Media and Sport described his presence as "a symbol of the friendship that exists between the two countries today". A memorial service was held in the evening at Westminster Abbey, which was attended by members of the royal family and Prime Minister Theresa May. During the service, Steinmeier read out a passage from 1 St John 4:7–11 in German.

Similar events were held across the United Kingdom's constituent countries and Crown Dependencies. In Scotland, Princess Anne attended a service at Glasgow Cathedral, while First Minister Nicola Sturgeon and other officials laid wreaths.

== Centenary in the wider Commonwealth ==
=== Africa ===
President of Ghana Nana Akufo-Addo participated in a wreath-laying ceremony on 2 November at the Christiansborg War Cemetery in Accra, along with Charles, Prince of Wales, his wife Camilla, Duchess of Cornwall, and Prince Edward, who were visiting Ghana.

The government and the British High Commission in Accra hosted a luncheon on the occasion of Remembrance Day on 11 November. President Akufo-Addo and a group of ex-servicemen observed a two-minute silence. On the same day, memorial services were held in South Africa, including a ceremony at the Union Buildings in Pretoria and the annual National Civic Remembrance Service in Johannesburg.

Ceremonies in Kenya and Zambia were scheduled for 25 November 2018; German forces fighting in Northern Rhodesia only received news of the armistice on 14 November 1918, three days after it had already came into effect, and eventually surrendered later that month. In Voi, the Commonwealth War Cemetery hosted a small ceremony, which was attended by British and German diplomats; a Kenyan army bugler played the Last Post during the ceremony, and wreaths were laid by a Kenyan general and some local and international visitors. The Zambian government sponsored a centenary event in the town of Mbala, organised by the national tourism agency, saying that attraction to the region would unlock the "tourism and investment potential of Northern Province".

=== Australia ===
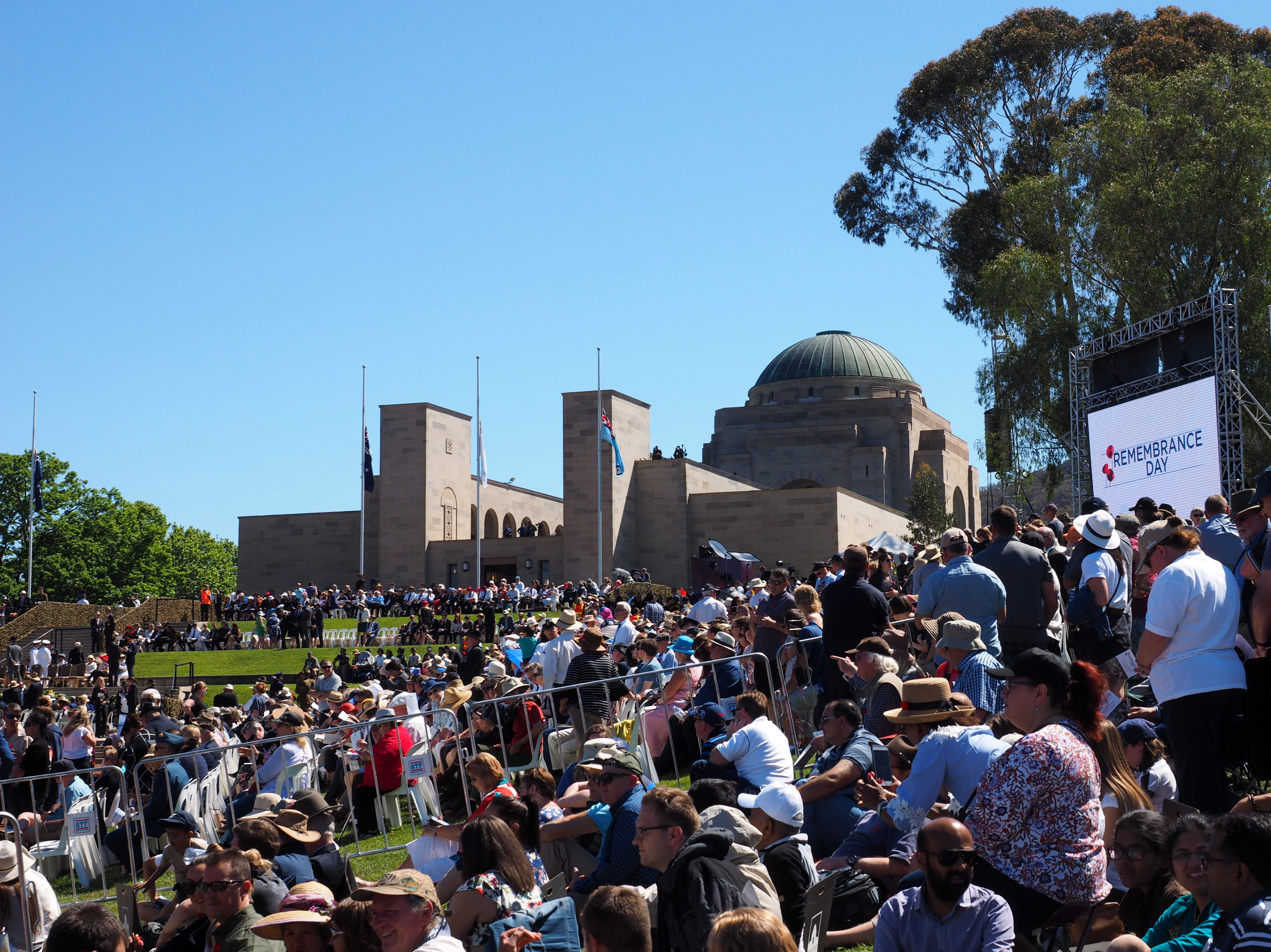
Part of the crowd outside the Australian War Memorial prior to the Remembrance Day ceremony

The Australian War Memorial in Canberra hosted a Remembrance Day service, including a national minute of silence in remembrance of Australian soldiers who fought and died in overseas conflicts. Prime Minister Scott Morrison addressed a crowd of more than 12,000 attending the ceremony. An extension of the Anzac Memorial in Sydney was opened to the public for the occasion.

Over a thousand people also attended a commemoration at the Australian National Memorial in the French town of Villers-Bretonneux.

=== Canada ===
Commemorations took place to mark Remembrance Day. The annual service at the National War Memorial was attended by Governor General Julie Payette and Defence Minister Harjit Sajjan, who represented the Trudeau ministry.

=== India ===
In a series of tweets, Prime Minister Narendra Modi paid tribute to Indian troops and pledged to "further an atmosphere of harmony and brotherhood".

A memorial service was held at the Delhi War Cemetery, where Indian and British delegates laid wreaths. Conservative MP Tom Tugendhat led the British delegation and was joined by Sir Dominic Asquith, British High Commissioner to India, and defence attaché Brigadier Mark Goldsack.

=== New Zealand ===
As part of the wider New Zealand WW100 commemorations, a national service took place at the Pukeahu National War Memorial Park in Wellington,. A 100-gun salute was held at the Wellington waterfront, and two minutes of silence were observed at 11 am (NZDT), followed by a cacophony of noise replicating how the public initially reacted to the news of the armistice a century prior. Governor-General Dame Patsy Reddy and Prime Minister Jacinda Ardern gave speeches at the event.

== Other locations ==
In addition to the locations listed below, memorial services also took place in Myanmar and Russia.

=== Belgium ===
National commemorations were held in the capital of Brussels. In an address, King Philippe pledged to keep "the memory of those who sacrificed themselves for us and the values for which they fought", and to "engage together in building a world of peace." A dove and 11 pigeons were released during the memorial service. In Ypres, a series of tributes to Commonwealth veterans was attended by the minister-president of Flanders, Geert Bourgeois. The Last Post, traditionally performed nightly at the Menin Gate since 1928, was additionally played at 11 am (CET) to mark the centenary.

Celebrations were held in Mons marking the anniversary of Canadian troops taking over the city from the Germans. The Black Watch (Royal Highland Regiment) of Canada led a recreated 1918 parade through the city.

=== Germany ===
In Germany, public memorisation was muted, due to evoking the defeat of the German Empire and the chronology of events resulting from the aftermath of the war. Some private events were organised, including a religious service at the Berlin Cathedral, and an exhibition showcasing works by 31 international artists, each representing countries involved in WWI peace negotiations. (Note: Twenty-nine signatory states of the Treaty of Versailles and Paris Peace Conference, as well as Russia and Ukraine.)

=== Hong Kong ===
The Hong Kong and China branch of the Royal British Legion and the Hong Kong Veterans Federation organised a public wreath-laying ceremony at the Cenotaph, which was attended by local dignitaries, international envoys, veterans, and representatives of religious groups and youth uniform teams. A two-minute silence was observed at 11 am (HKT).

=== Hungary ===
On 16 October 2018, the Hungarian National Bank released a series of commemorative collector coins, which included a silver variant with a face value of 10,000 HUF and a non-ferrous metal variant with a fifth (2,000 HUF) of the face value.

=== Ireland ===
A service was held at Glasnevin Cemetery in Dublin on 11 November, in the presence of president Michael D. Higgins and representatives of at least 47 countries. The Last Post was played during the ceremony. Higgins's second inauguration, which was scheduled to occur at midday, was delayed to allow him and government ministers to attend Armistice engagements.

=== Italy ===
On 4 November 2018, Italian president Sergio Mattarella and key political figures attended a National Unity and Armed Forces Day ceremony in Trieste marking the centenary of the armistice of Villa Giusti with Austria-Hungary. In a speech, Mattarella described the European Union as the "highest expression of a commitment to common good" to prevent future conflicts, and highlighted the history of antisemitism in the region.

=== Luxembourg ===
A ceremony was held at the Gëlle Fra monument in the capital during the late afternoon of 11 November, in the presence of Henri, Grand Duke of Luxembourg, and Grand Duchess Maria Teresa, as well as prime minister Xavier Bettel, who also paid tribute to war casualties.

=== Poland ===
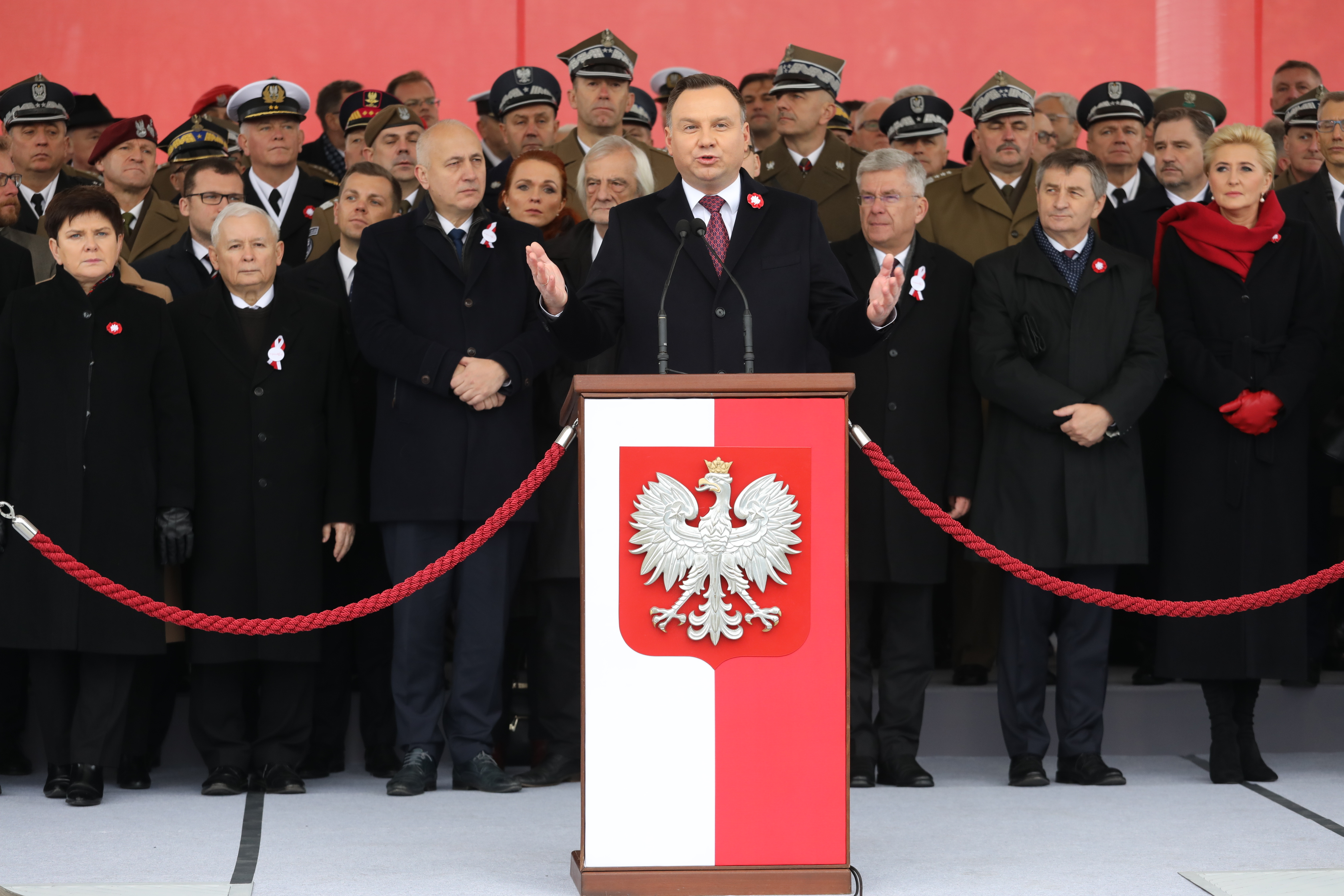
President Andrzej Duda addresses a crowd at a ceremony marking the centenary of Polish independence

The date of 11 November coincided with festivities marking the centenary of the foundation of the Second Polish Republic (celebrated as National Independence Day). Leaders, including president Andrzej Duda and Donald Tusk, former prime minister and President of the European Council, attended ceremonies honouring Józef Piłsudski, the founding father of the Second Polish Republic. Many marched in the capital of Warsaw, with Duda, prime minister Mateusz Morawiecki and leader of the ruling Law and Justice party Jarosław Kaczyński leading one of the marches.

The annual Independence March, organised by nationalist and far-right groups and which coincided with the other marches of the day, was initially banned by Warsaw mayor Hanna Gronkiewicz-Waltz; the ban was later overturned by a local court.

=== Romania ===
Army officers, ambassadors and other guests laid wreaths during a ceremony at a local war memorial.

=== United States ===
On Veterans Day, the National World War I Museum and Memorial in Kansas City, Missouri hosted a ceremony in which participants and relatives of WWI veterans tolled a "bell of peace" and laid wreaths in memory of those killed in the war. The Washington National Cathedral held a commemorative service, and a gathering took place at the District of Columbia War Memorial.

=== Vatican City ===
In remarks made during a weekly Angelus address, Pope Francis appealed for a rejection of a "culture of war", quoting Benedict XV, who served as pope during the majority of the First World War, and reflecting on the occasion of St. Martin's Day, which also fell on 11 November. The bells at St. Peter's Basilica were tolled in the afternoon in unison with other church bells across Europe.

== See also ==
- First World War centenary
  - Centenary of the outbreak of World War I
  - 100th anniversary of the Armenian genocide
- Armistice Day
- Remembrance Day
- Veterans Day
- Paris Peace Forum
