= Lights Out (event) =

Lights Out was an event on 4 August 2014 in the United Kingdom to commemorate the centenary of the start of World War I. It was inspired by the words of Sir Edward Grey, foreign secretary: "The lamps are going out all over Europe; we shall not see them lit again in our lifetime."

The main event was the voluntary turning off of lights from 10 pm to 11 pm in homes and other buildings across the country. In addition displays or special artwork were organised at a number of high-profile locations.
