= L'Anneau de la mémoire =

World War I memorial in Ablain-Saint-Nazaire, France

Ring of Memory
- L'Anneau de la Mémoire
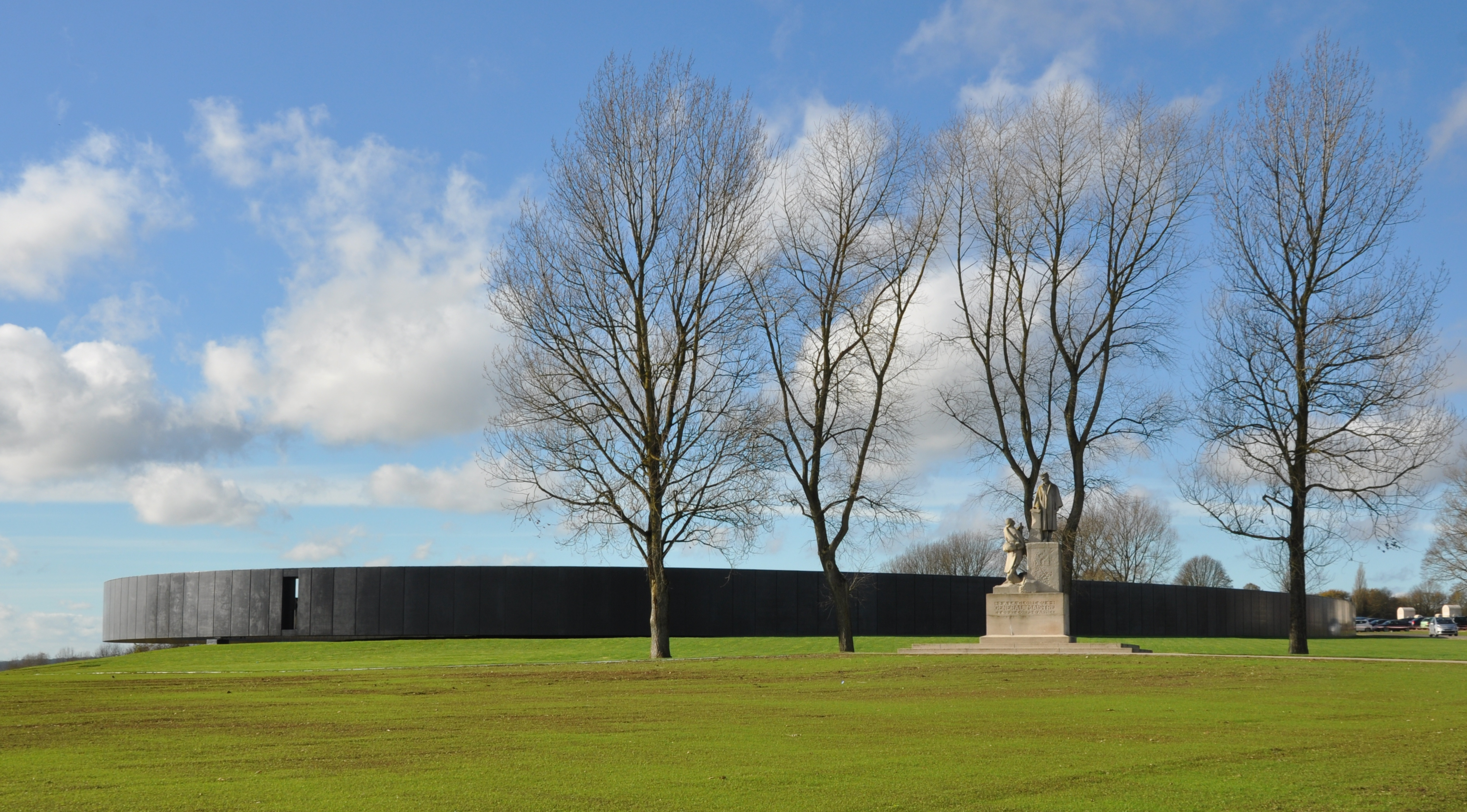
- L'Anneau de la Mémoire in Ablain-Saint-Nazaire, 2014
- Interactive map of Ring of Memory
- Location: Ablain-Saint-Nazaire
- Coordinates: 50°24′04″N 2°43′09″E
- Designer: Philippe Prost
- Type: monument
- Material: stainless steel and concrete
- Completion date: 11 November 2014 (inaugurated)

L'Anneau de la Mémoire ("The Ring of Memory" or "Ring of Remembrance") is a World War I memorial in Ablain-Saint-Nazaire, France. Designed by Philippe Prost and inaugurated on 11 November 2014, the 96th anniversary of Armistice Day, the memorial honors the 576,606 soldiers of forty different nationalities who died at Nord-Pas-de-Calais. The memorial is located at the site of the national cemetery of Notre-Dame-de-Lorette. The monument consists of 500 metal panels that are arranged in an ellipse pattern, each 3 meters (almost 10 ft) in height. Each panel contains approximately 1200 names of fallen soldiers, listed alphabetically by last name. The 500th panel remains blank so that any newly discovered names may be inscribed. The most noteworthy aspect of the Ring of Memory is that it is the first memorial to list alphabetically, with no regard to rank nor nationality.

== Description ==
The memorial consists of an 1132-foot perimeter ellipse (about the length of 3.75 football fields) constructed out of stainless steel panels and concrete, with a 200-foot portion elevated off of the ground. The panels are arranged facing inwards on the ring and list the 579,606 casualties in Nord-Pas-de-Calais between 1914 and 1918. Each of the 500 panels is 10 feet in height, and is engraved with the names of approximately 1,200 men, with the 500th panel remaining blank so that any newly discovered names may be inscribed. The names are listed alphabetically, rather than by nationality, starting with "A, Tet" and concluding with "Zschiesche, Paul". It resides around 550 feet away from France's largest military cemetery at Ablain Saint-Nazaire, the site of the three Battles of Artois

== History ==
The monument was built in Nord-Pas-de-Calais, on a plot of 5.4 acres of land on a hill 541 feet high, which was commonly referred to as the "bloody hill". Nord-Pas-de-Calais is historically a strategic military location in both World Wars. Not only was it a major component of the Western Front, but is also rich in resources such as coal. The monument accurately names 579,606 of the soldiers who died on this front from 1914 to 1918. The names on the monument were compiled from mainly German, British, and French archives. It sits 180 yards from Notre-Dame-de-Lorette, France's largest military cemetery.

=== Inauguration ===
The monument was chosen in a public contest and was set to be built on 13 April 2011. It was designed by French designer, Philippe Prost. The monument was inaugurated in an Armistice Day commemoration on 11 November 2014 by French President François Hollande. The President of the Regional Council of Nord-Pas-de-Calais, Daniel Percheron, and the German Minister of Defense, Ursula von der Leyen, were also in attendance of the inauguration ceremony. Neither the German Chancellor nor the British Prime Minister were in attendance.

== Significance ==
On the source of his inspiration, Prost explains, "I was thinking about the rings you make when you're a child, or a human ring when everyone holds each others' hands in a sign of fellowship, and that seemed to me like the image, the form best suited to speaking about these 600,000 soldiers killed in the Nord-Pas-de-Calais region, and who today are brought together all in one place." The elliptical shape of the monument captures this sentiment and evokes a sense of "posthumous fraternity" and unity among countries that were once enemies. It draws no lines, makes no distinctions, and instead recognizes a common and inclusive humanity. The memorial invokes a sense of European loss rather than strictly national loss.

The ring symbolizes eternity and the continuous cycle of birth and death. The materials used to construct the ring, stainless steel and concrete, are materials that will withstand the passing of time, which further reinforces the sense of eternity. While the ring is a symbol of the current peace in Europe, part of it hangs precariously over the hillside, reminding the visitors that peace is not always stable and conflict can return at any time.

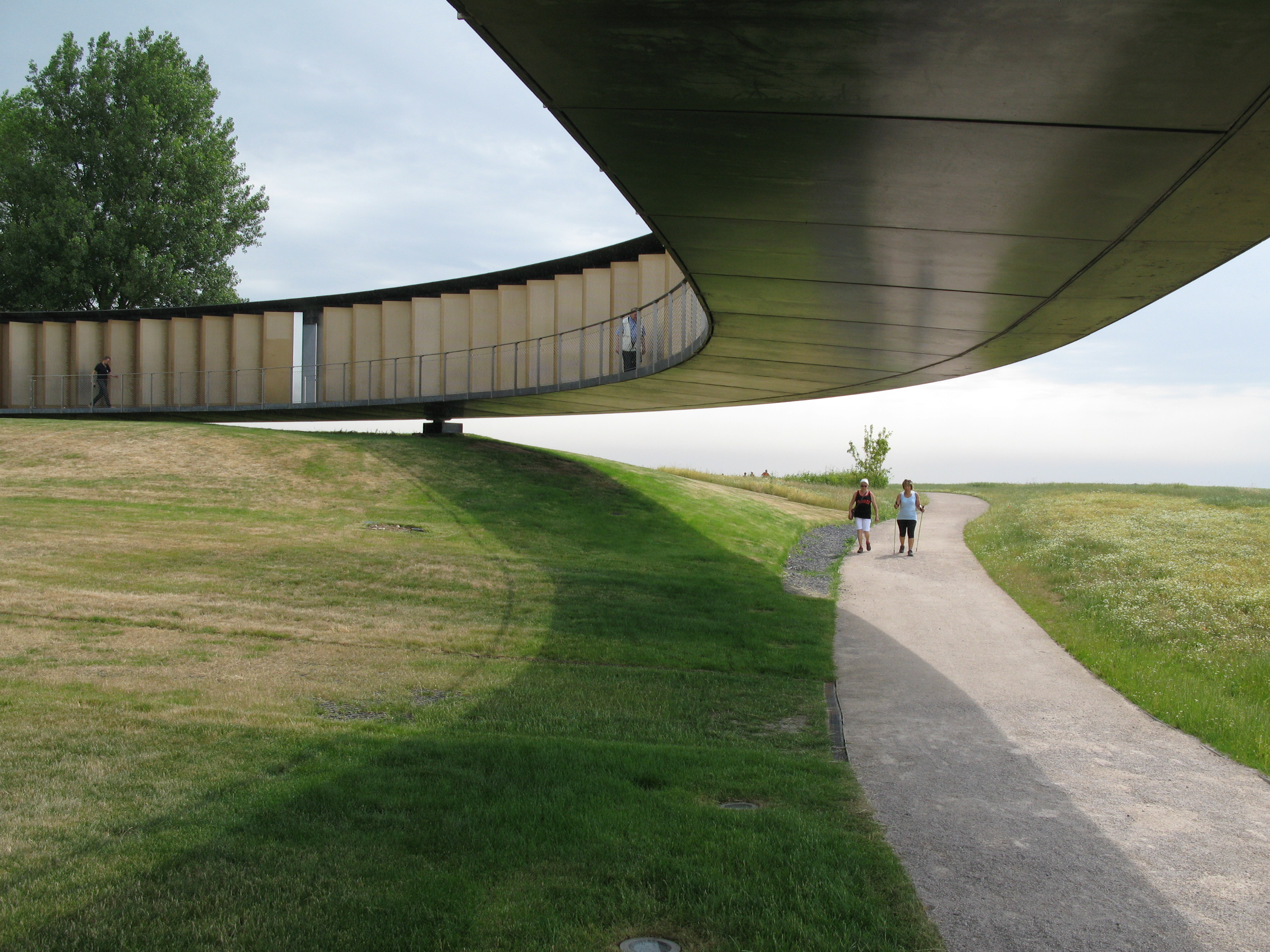
Hanging over a slope © Carolin Hahnemann

The Ring of Memory is the only memorial that lists names alphabetically with no distinctions in rank, nationality, or allegiance. Prost stresses, "No ranks, no nationalities: just a dizzying list of the human stories that ended on France's northern battlefields." The names of friends and foes are engraved together in order to establish a theme of forgiveness and reconciliation after the conflict.

== Related memorials ==
In its design, the Ring of Memory is both similar and different to other famous war memorials. Like the Vietnam Veterans Memorial in Washington, D.C., it lists the soldiers without distinction for rank, although the Vietnam Veterans Memorial lists the names chronologically, not alphabetically, and fails to list millions of Vietnamese soldiers. The Vietnam Veterans Memorial is also made of black granite, not steel, so the polished surface reflects the memorial's surroundings and those standing in front of it. The National World War II Memorial, also located in Washington, D.C., is similarly shaped like a ring, but it is sunken below ground level instead of above it, and uses golden stars to denote the number of casualties instead of lists of names. Blood Swept Lands and Seas of Red, an art installation constructed in the Tower of London to commemorate the centenary of World War I, also used symbolism to represent the number of casualties sustained by the British Empire and the Commonwealth, but also did not make distinction for rank or nationality. The Arc de Triomphe, another French war memorial, is distinctly different from the Ring, as it only lists high-ranking officers from the French army according to their rank, and not any enlisted men. The Arc de Triomphe also only denotes a casualty by underlining the dead soldier's name.

== See also ==
- World War I memorials
- First World War centenary
