= Spectra (installation) =

Series of art installations by Ryoji Ikeda

spectra [london], 2014. The beam could be seen for miles above the rooftops and chimneys of London.

Spectra is the name of a series of art installations by Ryoji Ikeda which use intense white light as a sculptural material. The most recent presentation of spectra was in Hobart, Tasmania, Australia for four days ending 24 June 2018 to mark the winter solstice, and as an installation piece at the Dark Mofo festival held by MONA. spectra [Amsterdam] was the first presentation of the work in 2008 its current form; an array of xenon lamps pointed skywards lit from dusk till dawn accompanied by a mathematically derived score audible from each of the lamp bases. The work was first commissioned and produced by Forma Arts.

== History ==
Ryoji Ikeda has produced spectra installations in a number of locations, all in several different configurations. The first was a tunnel of light and sound at JFK Airport at Eero Saarinen's abandoned TWA Terminal in New York in 2004. Four site-specific light and sound installations were created across Amsterdam in 2008 for the city's Dream Amsterdam event. A more concentrated 64-beam installation was then created in Paris that year for their annual Nuit Blanche festival. Other cities which have hosted the installation include Buenos Aires, Hobart, and Nagoya.

== spectra [tasmania], 2013 ==
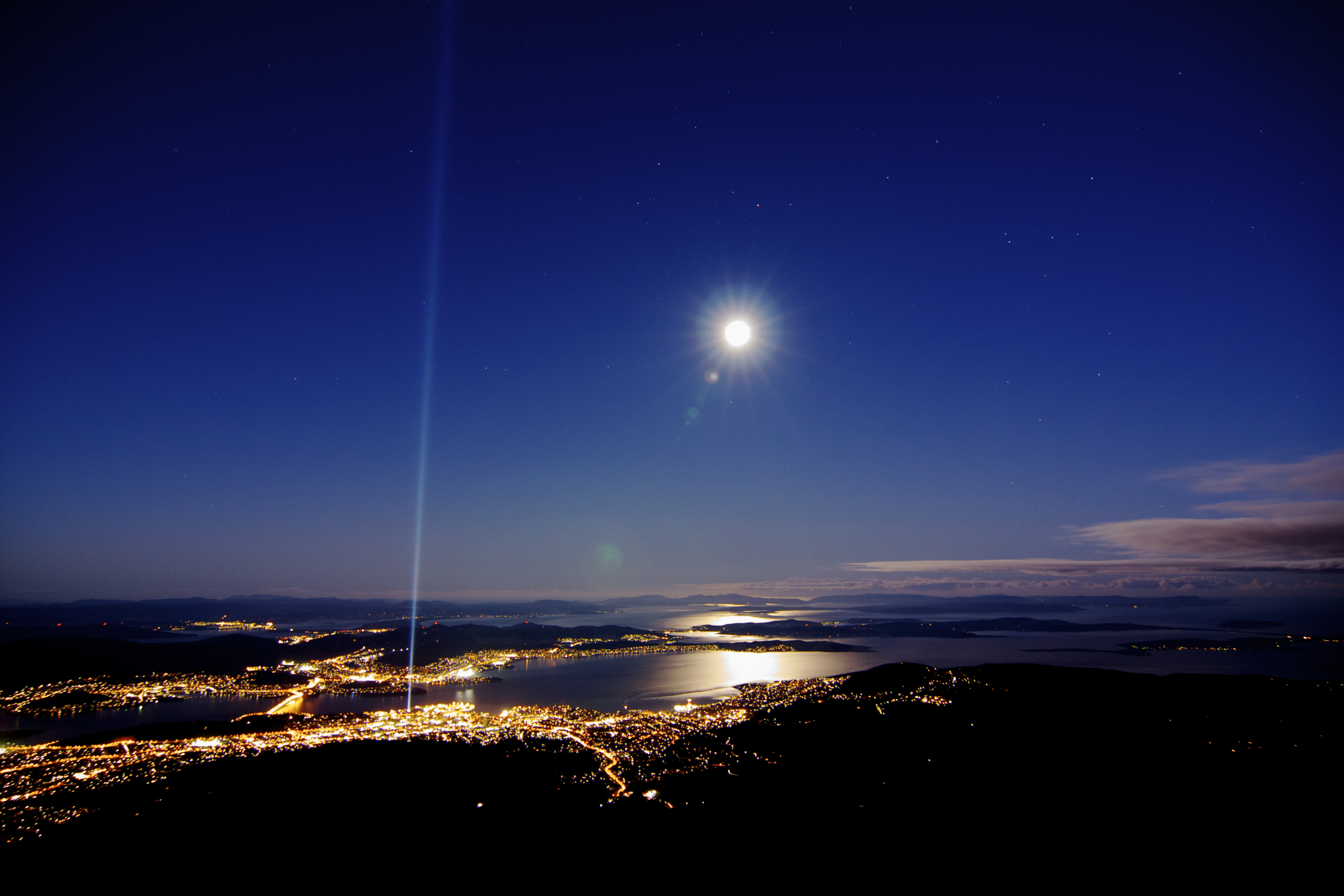
spectra [tasmania] pierces the Hobart Skyline, 22 June 2013.

spectra [tasmania] was an installation of 49 Xenon searchlights. It was placed in front of Hobart's Cenotaph on the western shore of that city's central business district. Installed and active from sunset to sunrise 14–23 June 2013 as part of Beam In Thine Own Eye, a group exhibition for the first Dark Mofo Festival. It was estimated to reach 5–15 km into the sky, depending on the weather.

== spectra [london], 2014 ==
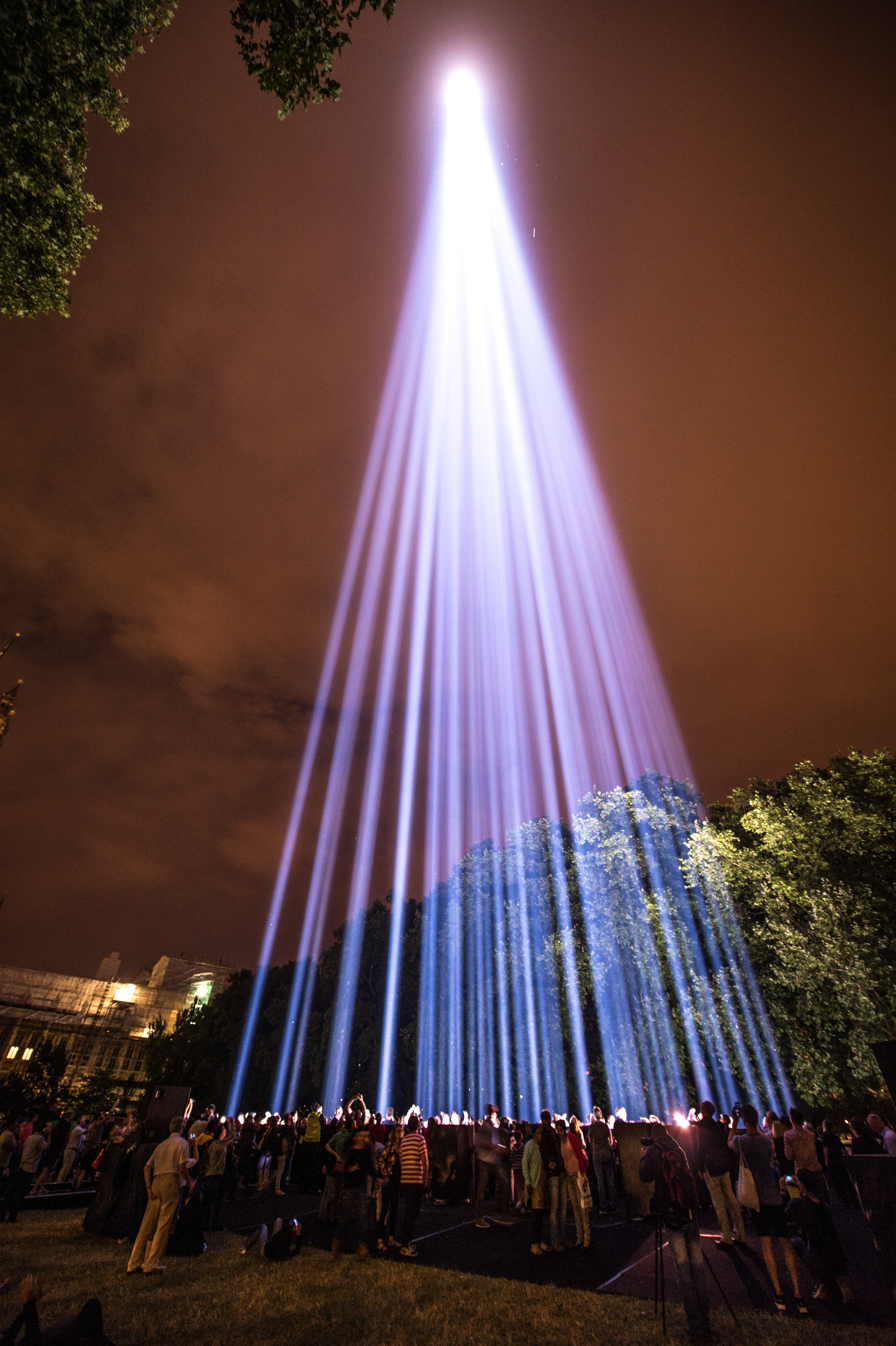
Spectra London, Victoria Tower Gardens

The London installation consisted similarly of 49 Xenon searchlights shining together into the sky, accompanied by a soundscape. This presentation of Spectra was produced and presented by Artangel and co-commissioned by Mayor of London Boris Johnson and the 14-18 NOW programme of the Imperial War Museum for the centenary of World War One. and funded by the Heritage Lottery Fund. It was switched on at the end of the Lights Out event on 4 August 2014, when the lights of many buildings in the UK were turned off in recollection of Sir Edward Grey's famous prophecy that, "The lamps are going out all over Europe; we shall not see them lit again in our lifetime." The installation was turned off for good at dawn on 11 August 2014, as the presentation was only planned to last for one week.

The spotlights used were xenon arc lamps requiring 4 kilowatts of power each. The array and the sound system was powered by four diesel generators fuelled by vegetable oil. A crew of thirty technicians assembled, tested and maintained the installation. The soundscape was inspired by mathematical concepts and consisted of pure sine waves.

== Permanent Installation ==
In 2018 it was displayed from the grounds of MONA (Museum of Old and New Art) with the addition of Ikeda's accompanying soundscape, where it was confirmed that plans were in place to house spectra at the museum permanently. During Dark Mofo 2023, it was temporarily relocated to Dark Park (Macquarie Point, neighboring the Cenotaph) powered with diesel generators.

During May 2024 the previous site of spectra's installation at MONA was under construction, and the Dark Mofo festival was announced as not going ahead, citing "a period of renewal.". After continued site works at the museum in 2025, spectra was turned on once again in 2026 between the 14th and 21st of June. The museum says it will return again in June, 2027

== Gallery ==
Crowds are drawn to the nightly spectacle in London

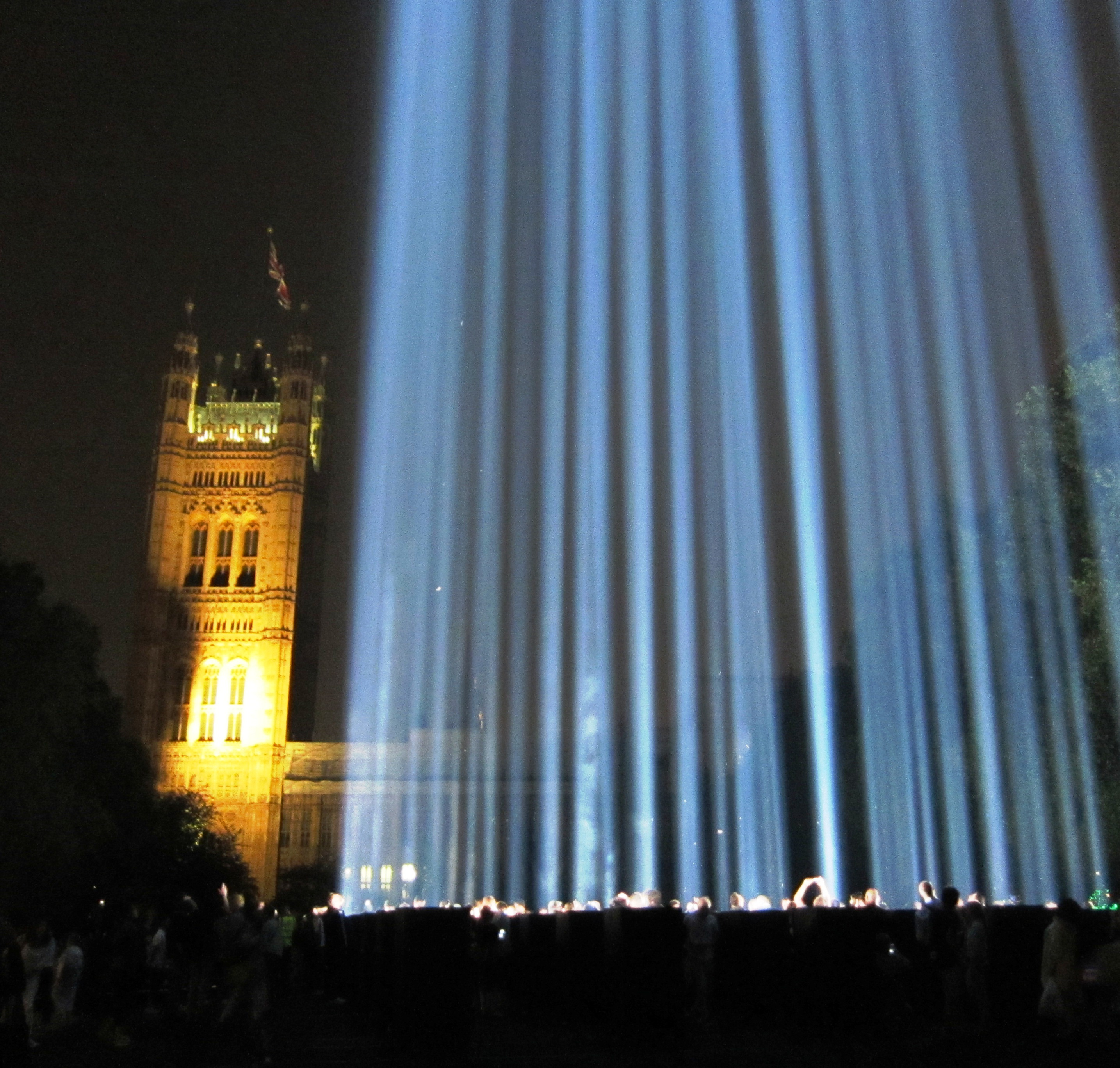
The base of the London installation was in Victoria Tower Gardens

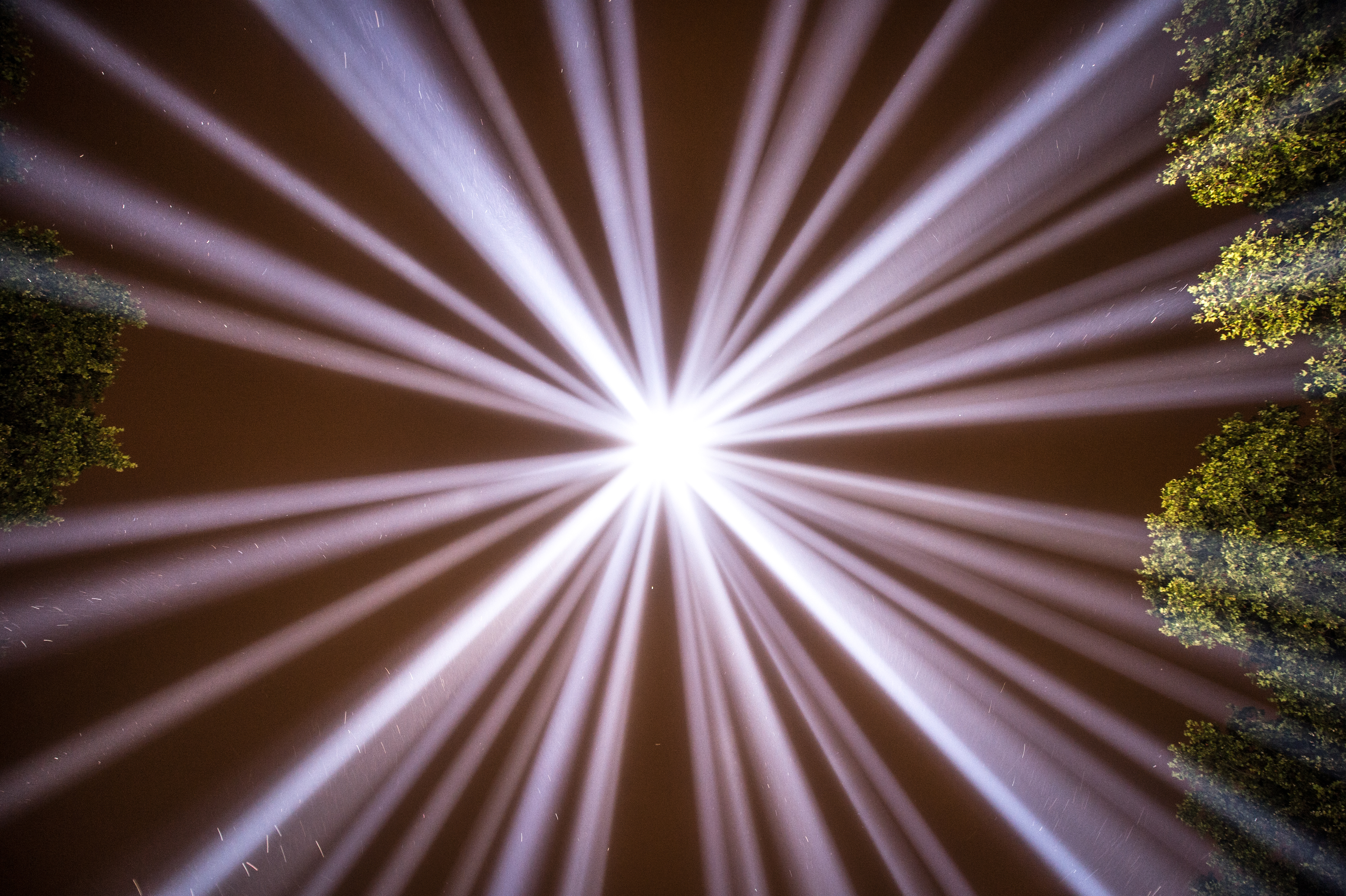
Looking up towards the sky while standing in the middle of Spectra London

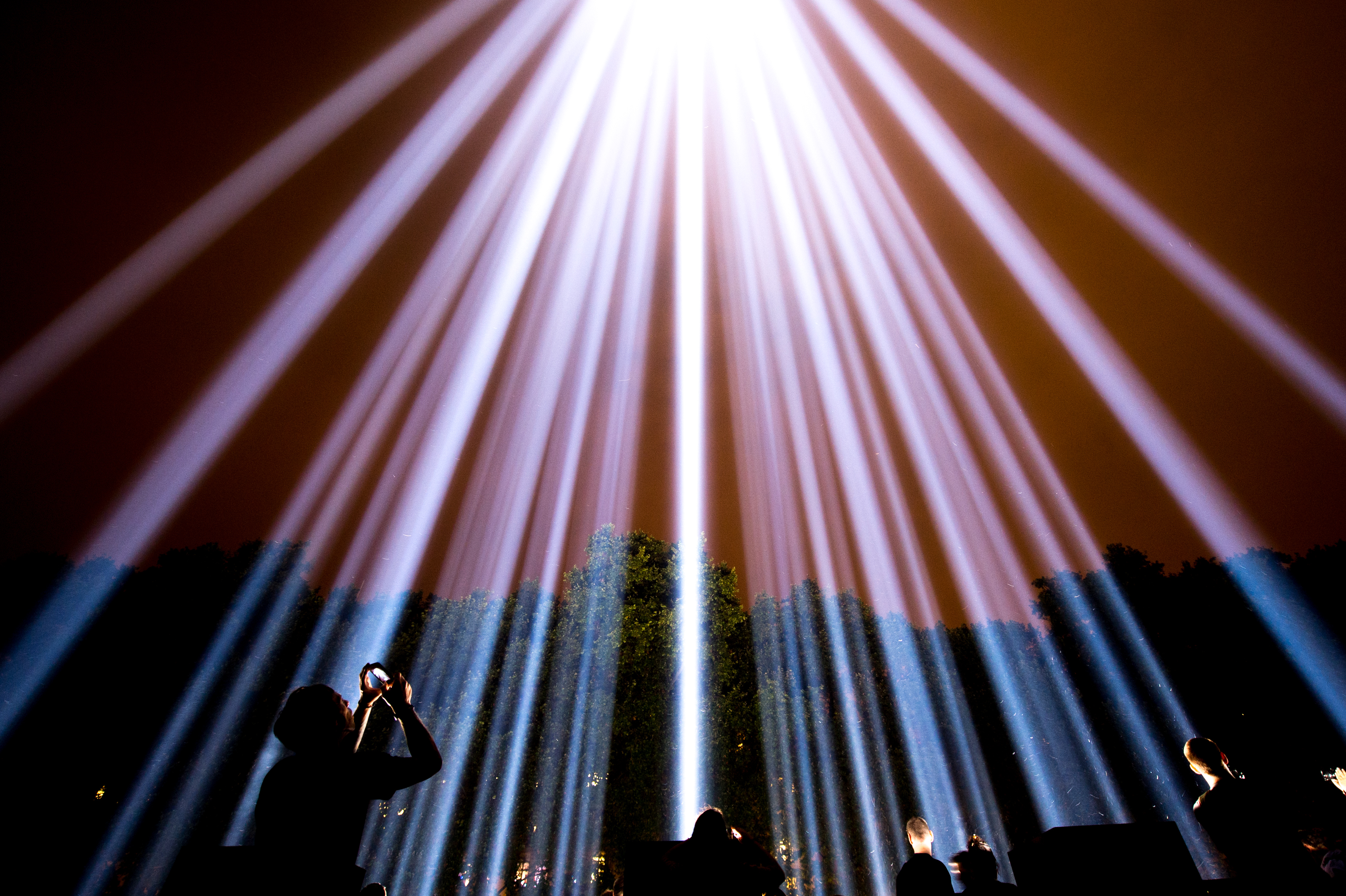
Spectra London

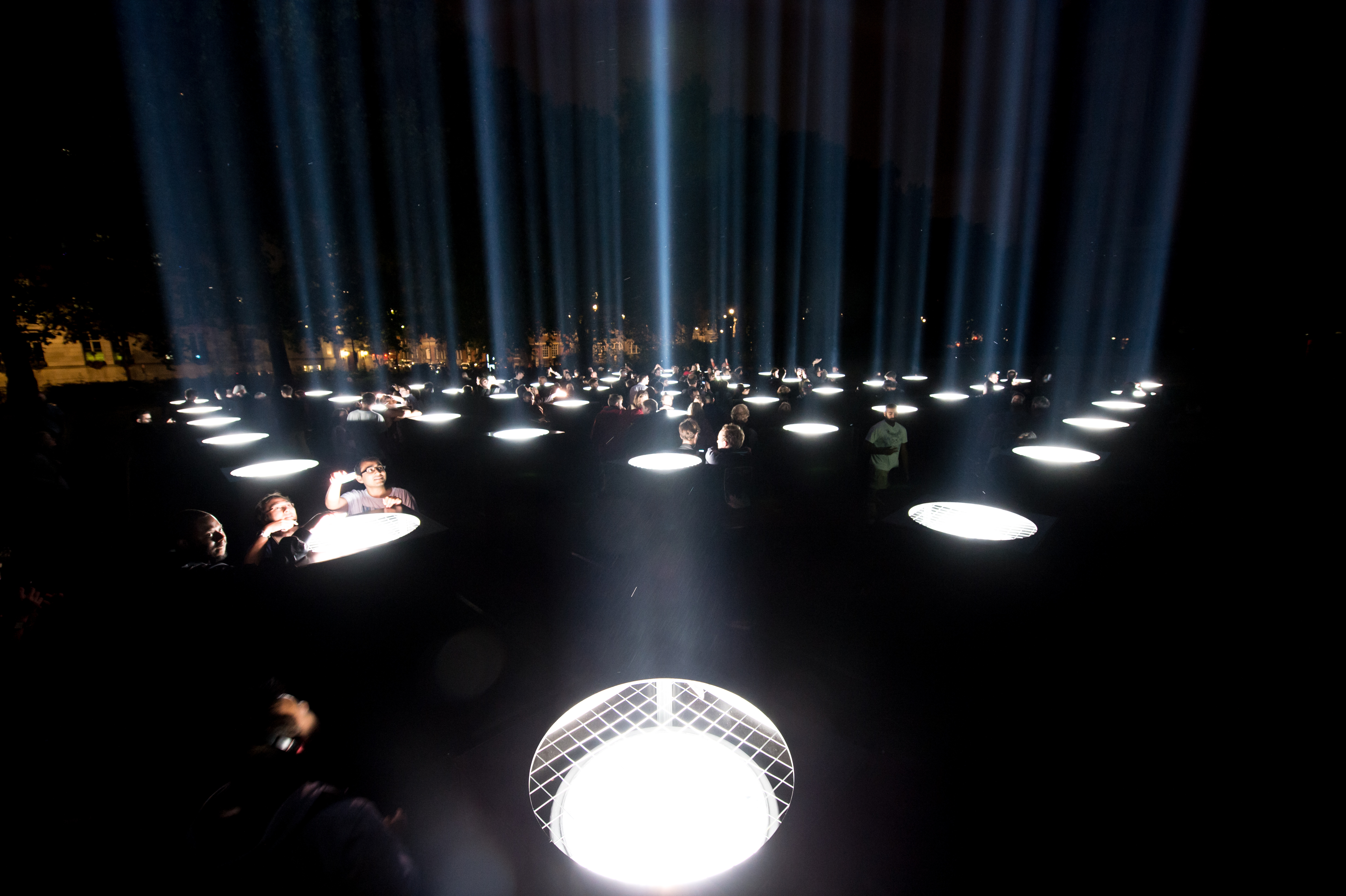
Spectra London

== See also ==
- Light pollution
- Cathedral of light, a 1937 Nazi propaganda display with massed searchlights pointing skyward
- Luxor Hotel and Casino skybeam, currently the world's brightest searchlight display
- A Symphony of Lights, a light display across Hong Kong harbour
- Tribute in Light, a memorial of the 11 September attack on the World Trade Centre
- Imagine Peace Tower, memorial art work in relation to the murder and birth of John Lennon, celebrating "Imagine Peace" wishes.
