= Beyond the Deepening Shadow =

Commemorative installation

Coordinates: 51.50912°N 0.07528°W

Beyond the Deepening Shadow: The Tower Remembers was an artistic installation at the Tower of London in November 2018, to commemorate the centenary of the end of the First World War.

Each evening in the week before Remembrance Day, 10,000 torches were lit in the moat of the tower, after an opening ceremony of a bugle call, minute of silence and reveille. The torches remained lit for several hours while loudspeakers broadcast a soundscape composed by Mira Calix, based on a sonnet written by nurse Mary Borden to a British officer at the Somme. The event was conceived by Tom Piper and directed by Anna Morrissey.

The installation was similar to Blood Swept Lands and Seas of Red, an installation of poppies at the Tower which commemorated the start of the war. That was so popular that crowd control measures were organised to control the large number of spectators.
