= Shrouds of the Somme =

2018 artwork by Rob Heard

Coordinates: 51°32′13.79″N 0°0′43.41″W

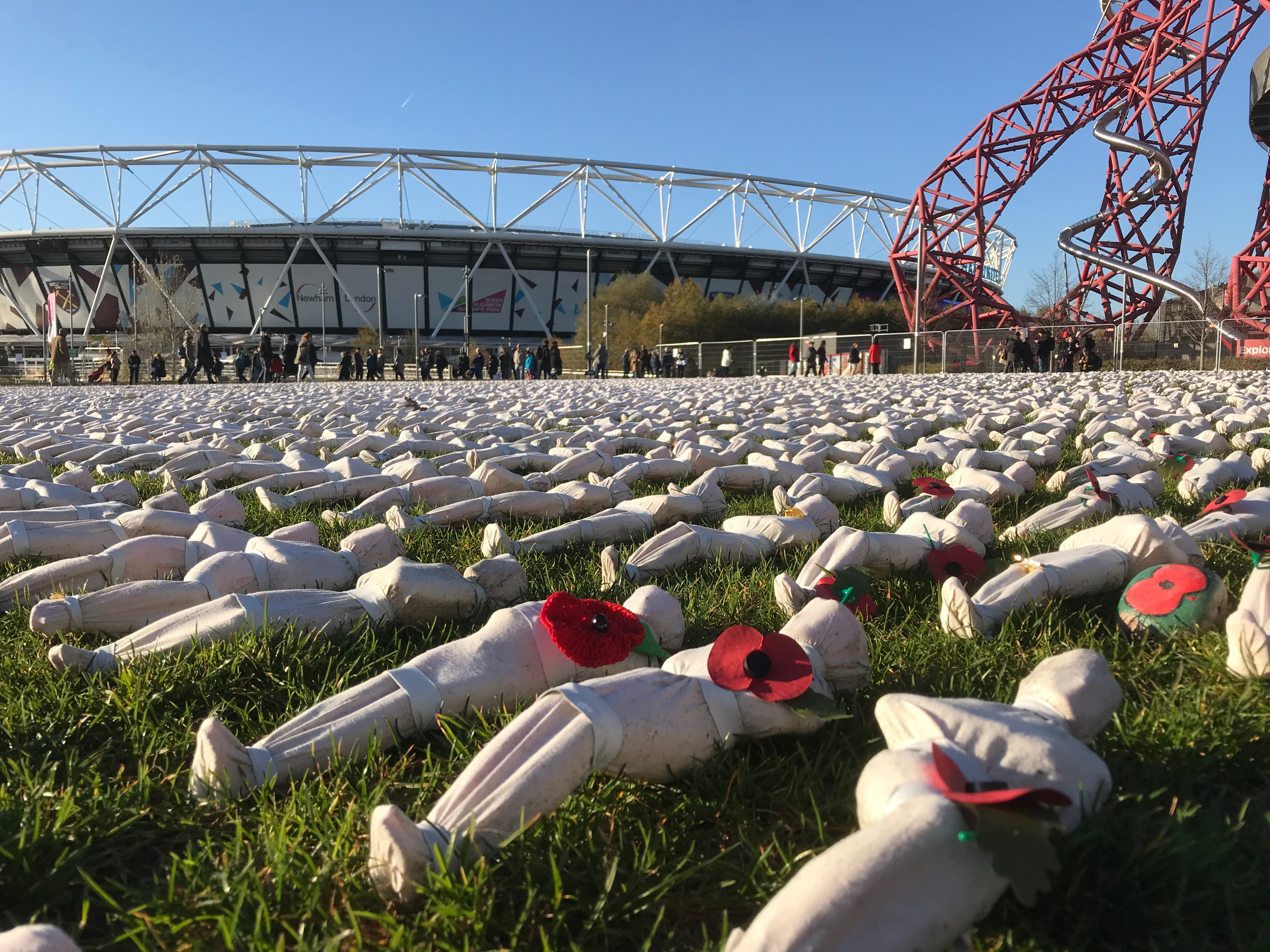
Shrouds of the Somme at Queen Elizabeth Olympic Park, London

Shrouds of the Somme is an artwork by British artist Rob Heard which commemorates the 72,396 servicemen from the British Commonwealth with no known grave, whose names are recorded at Thiepval Memorial as missing presumed dead at the Battle of the Somme. It is estimated that more than three million men fought in the battle, and more than one million men were wounded or killed, making it one of the bloodiest battles in human history.

The work comprises 72,396 small human figurines, each separately wrapped in a calico shroud which was cut and sewn by hand. The full installation was laid out at the Queen Elizabeth Olympic Park from 8 to 18 November 2018, over the centenary of the Armistice of 11 November 1918 that ended the First World War.

== Background ==
Heard started the work after suffering injuries to his hands in a car accident in 2013 which prevented him continuing with his earlier artworks. He was inspired by injured British servicemen returning from Afghanistan, and the difficulty to envision the 19,240 Commonwealth soldiers killed on the first day of the Battle of the Somme, on 1 July 1916. The shrouded figures draw in part from the films of Ridley Scott, and presents a tangible three dimensional representation of each dead soldier and of the scale of the casualties.

Determined to make each figure an individual, each shroud covers a plastic figurine approximately 12 inches (300 mm) long (approximately 1:6 scale); the figurines are jointed so each can take its own slightly different position. The calico shrouds are cut by hand, wrapped around the figure, and then sewn up and tied on. As he worked, Heard crossed off a name from the official list of the missing for each shrouded figure he completed, creating a relationship between that figure and a specific person. Heard built a shed in his garden in Somerset to assemble and store the shrouded figures. He received early financial support from songwriter Steve Knightley, Exeter City Council, and the Exeter Chiefs Foundation.

After completing and exhibiting 19,240 shrouded figures, Heard resolved to expand the work by adding another 60,000 figures to represent all 72,396 Commonwealth soldiers missing during the 5 months of the Battle of the Somme, from 1 July and 18 November 1916. He aimed to complete the work for the centenary of the Armistice of 11 November 1918 that ended the First World War. Heard's work was supported by a team including Shrouds of the Somme committee chairman Commodore Jake Moores, project director Mel Bradley, and (from June 2017) project patron Jim Carter. Completing the work took approximately 13,000 hours, working almost continuously on this project over the five years from 2013 to the centenary of the end of the First World War in 2018, finishing only days before the completed work went on display in London. Support was received from a number of organisations, including VolkerFitzpatrick, DHL, West Ham United F.C., Westfield Group, Network Rail, Transport for London and Waitrose.

== Exhibition ==
An assemblage of 19,240 shrouded figures was laid out by soldiers from the 6th battalion of The Rifles and exhibited in Exeter for the centenary of the Battle of the Somme in July 2016, attracting over 60,000 visitors. The assemblage was then exhibited in Bristol for Remembrance Sunday, in November 2016.

The extended work was laid out as "The Trench" in Exeter in June 2018, with approaching 72,000 models stacked in 2.3 m (7 ft 7 in) high wooden frames to create a replica trench about 45 m (148 ft) long that the public could walk through. The names of the missing were listed on the outside of the frames.

After displays in Salisbury, Exeter, Belfast, Bristol in the UK, and at Thiepval in France, the full installation was laid out at the Queen Elizabeth Olympic Park, in Stratford, East London, in November 2018, with all 72,396 models placed on a lawn in strictly regimented rows by volunteers from the 1st battalion, Royal Anglian Regiment. The shrouds took three days to put in place, covering an area of 4,000 m^{2} (43,000 sq ft) on the South Park Lawn near the ArcelorMittal Orbit. It was described by the historian Dan Snow as "the most remarkable First World War commemoration you will ever see".

Displayed alongside the main installation was "Lost Lives", a separate display of 1,561 shrouds, one for each day of the First World War, with each shrouded figure accompanied by a cross listing the number of Commonwealth war casualties on that day. Posters with copies of the official list of the missing were displayed nearby. During the exhibition, volunteers recited names from the list.

The installation went on public display from Thursday 8 to Sunday 18 November, with free entry. A memorial service was held on Sunday 11 November 2018, led by Reverend Canon Flora Winfield. The exhibition was visited by Anne, Princess Royal on Thursday 15 November.

Donations were collected for SSAFA - the Armed Forces charity, and the Commonwealth War Graves Commission. The models will be sold for £35 each, with proceeds also donated to those two charities.
