= The lamps are going out =

Saying about the eve of the First World War

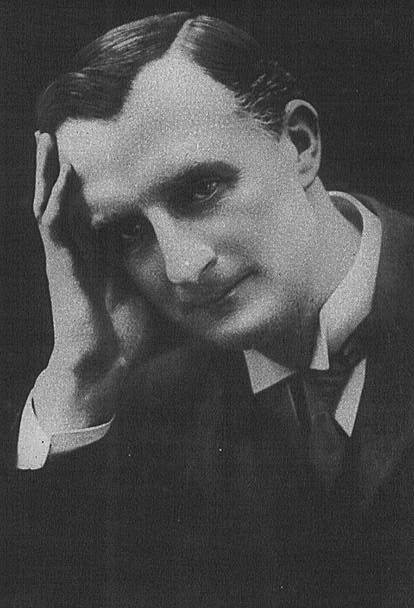
Edward Grey, 1st Viscount Grey of Fallodon (1862–1933)

"The lamps are going out all over Europe, we shall not see them lit again in our life-time", British Foreign Secretary Sir Edward Grey remarked to a friend on the eve of the United Kingdom's entry into the First World War. First published in Grey's memoirs in 1925, the statement earned wide attention as an accurate perception of the First World War and its geopolitical and cultural consequences.

== Original sources ==
Grey's memoirs Twenty-Five Years 1892–1916 mention the remark as being made on 3 August 1914:

A friend came to see me on one of the evenings of the last week — he thinks it was on Monday, August 3rd. We were standing at a window of my room in the Foreign Office. It was getting dusk, and the lamps were being lit in the space below on which we were looking. My friend recalls that I remarked on this with the words: "The lamps are going out all over Europe, we shall not see them lit again in our life-time."

In 1927, John Alfred Spender, editor of the Westminster Gazette until 1922, identified himself as the friend to whom Grey had spoken:

I had two short talks with Grey during the "twelve days." I ran into him on the stairs of the Foreign Office on Saturday, August 1st [...] I saw him again late in the evening at his room at the Foreign Office on Monday, August 3rd, and it was to me he used the words which he has repeated in his book, "The lamps are going out all over Europe, and we shall not see them lit again in our lifetime." We were standing together at the window looking out into the sunset across St. James's Park, and the appearance of the first lights along the Mall suggested the thought.

== Later allusions ==
Grey's quotation has been used as a summation of the war in numerous historical works. The German author Ludwig Reiners (1896–1957) published an account of World War I entitled The lamps went out in Europe. Therein Grey's comment is followed by the assertion attributed to Otto von Bismarck: "The mistakes that have been committed in foreign policy are not, as a rule, apparent to the public until a generation afterwards." Samuel Hynes began his 1990 A War Imagined with a paragraph covering the quotation, referring to it as the best-known and most often quoted response to the beginning of the war. In 2014 Grey's words were the inspiration for part of the British commemoration of the centenary of the outbreak of the First World War. Between 10 and 11 pm on 4 August 2014, lights were dimmed at many public locations and in private homes, including progressively at a national memorial service in Westminster Abbey.

On 16 October 1938, Winston Churchill broadcast a speech known as "The Defence of Freedom and Peace (The Lights are Going Out)" to London and the United States. In the speech he says, "The stations of uncensored expression are closing down; the lights are going out; but there is still time for those to whom freedom and parliamentary government mean something, to consult together."
