= Wuhan flu =

Wuhan flu may be:

- an informal term for COVID-19 that is generally associated with xenophobia related to the pandemic
- the name of a song on the 2020 Borat Subsequent Moviefilm
