= Xenophobia and racism related to the COVID-19 pandemic =

Racial prejudice as a result of the COVID-19 pandemic

The COVID-19 pandemic was first reported in the city of Wuhan, Hubei, China, in December 2019. The origins of the virus have subsequently led to an increase in acts and displays of sinophobia, as well as prejudice, xenophobia, discrimination, violence, and racism against people of East Asian and Southeast Asian descent and appearance around the world. With the spread of the pandemic and formation of hotspots, such as those in Asia, Europe, and the Americas, discrimination against people from these hotspots has been reported.

The pandemic also saw a rise in antisemitism; several reports documented conspiracy theories blaming Jews for "engineering and profiting from the COVID-19 pandemic", and some hate groups falsely labeled Jews as "being a main vector of the virus".

== Background ==
In the past, many diseases have been named after geographical locations, such as Middle East Respiratory Syndrome and Zika virus, but in 2015, the World Health Organization introduced recommendations to avoid this practice, to reduce stigma. In accordance with this policy, the WHO recommended the official name "COVID-19" in February 2020.

In early coverage of the outbreak, some news sources associated the virus with China in a manner that contributed to stigma. The journal Nature later published an apology for this type of coverage. However, even after the majority of politicians had switched to avoiding stigmatizing language when referring to the virus, a minority continued.

Following the progression of the outbreak to new hotspot countries, people from Italy (the first country in Europe to experience a serious outbreak of COVID-19) were also subjected to suspicion and xenophobia, as were people from hotspots in other countries. Discrimination against Muslims in India escalated after public health authorities identified an Islamic missionary (Tablighi Jamaat) group's gathering in New Delhi in early March 2020 as a source of spread. As of late April 2020, Paris had seen riots break out over police treatment of marginalised ethnic groups during the then in-place lockdown. Racism and xenophobia towards southern and south east Asians increased in the Arab states of the Persian Gulf. In China, some people of African descent were evicted from their homes and told to leave China within 24 hours, due to disinformation that they and other foreigners were spreading the virus. This racism and xenophobia was criticised by some foreign governments, diplomatic corps, and the Chinese ambassador to Zimbabwe.

== Africa ==
=== Cameroon ===
The US embassy in Yaoundé issued a travel warning to US citizens amid reports of "... verbal and online harassment, stone throwing, and banging on vehicles occupied by expatriates". Some residents of Cameroon thought that Europeans and Americans brought COVID to Africa.

=== Egypt ===
According to the Embassy of Japan in Cairo, store clerks had been hesitating to serve Japanese customers, and "corona" had become a new slur with which to abuse Japanese people on the street.

On 10 March 2020, an Uber driver was arrested after a viral video showing the driver forcibly removing his Chinese passenger at a highway in Cairo's Maadi district on suspicion of having the virus. In the video, a voice is heard in the video jokingly shouting "The first coronavirus case in Egypt!" and the same voice then tells the driver "May God support you, Hajji! Throw him out!". The incident has sparked outrage among Egyptians after the video was uploaded. Some Egyptians visited the Chinese man in his hotel and expressed an apology to him for the incident, widely condemned in the local media as an act of bullying and racism.

=== Ethiopia ===
Violence towards foreigners has been reported amidst the pandemic, with some locals attacking foreigners on social media by publishing photos of them and linking them to the coronavirus. The Foreign Correspondents Association of Ethiopia had warned that "dangerous rumours" and "vicious posts" were being spread on the internet about foreign journalists, while other foreigners had been physically attacked.

=== Kenya ===
A video reportedly recorded in Kibera, Kenya, in March 2020 shows an angry crowd threatening a man and a woman of East Asian descent about the coronavirus. A man in the crowd shouts at the frightened couple, "You are corona!" A motorcycle rider from the crowd later raised his hand threatening to slap the Asian man. Growing unease towards Chinese immigrants has been reported in the streets of Nairobi and its environment especially towards construction workers.

An alleged Kenyan member of parliament posted in a Facebook message that his constituents had the right to stone and chase away any Chinese visitors who were not quarantined. A Kenyan taxi driver told the BBC that Chinese nationals had been changing their usernames on taxi hailing apps to avoid their passenger requests being declined.

=== Nigeria ===
Geopolitical analyst Ovigwe Eguegu reported that "a plethora of conspiracy theories, and videos of Asians (some Chinese) eating bats, and other exotic animals" on Nigerian social media has led to increased Sinophobia.

=== South Africa ===
An ethnic Chinese man in Johannesburg told the news broadcaster Deutsche Welle that violent comments such as "wipe the Chinese people out" and "hope this virus gets all of them" have been expressed in the country by locals. Additionally, one of the earliest reactions of the South African government with regard to COVID-19 prevention was to build a forty-kilometer (25 mi) fence on the border with Zimbabwe. This action was intended to "ensure that no undocumented or infected persons cross into the country", according to Public Works Minister Patricia de Lille. In February 2021, the Director of The Jesuit Institute South Africa, Father Russell Pollitt, criticized as potentially xenophobic Health Minister Dr. Zweli Mkhize's announcement that COVID-19 vaccine distribution would be limited to only South African citizens.

== Asia ==
=== Bangladesh ===
The Bangladeshi government has sent dozens of Rohingya refugees, who had remained stranded at sea for several weeks, to Bhasan Char, an uninhabited island in the estuary of the Meghna river. Hundreds more remain stranded on two overcrowded trawlers between Bangladesh and Malaysia. Human rights groups have criticised the Bangladeshi and Malaysian governments for using the coronavirus pandemic as a pretext to send away refugees.

=== Mainland China ===
There have been instances of Wuhan natives in other provinces being turned away from hotels, having their ID numbers, home addresses and telephone numbers deliberately leaked online or dealing with harassing phone calls from strangers. Some places also reportedly had signs saying "people from Wuhan and cars from Hubei are not welcome here." Many hotels and guesthouses refrained from people who had addresses in Wuhan. Multiple hotels purportedly refused to check-in a Wuhan tour guide after she returned to Hangzhou from Singapore with one of them calling the police to give her a health check and asking the police to quarantine her. Amidst these incidents, various cities and prefectures outside of Hubei adopted resettlement measures for Hubei people in their region such as designated hotel accommodation for visitors from the province. In Zhengding, Jingxing and Luquan of Shijiazhuang City, the local governments rewarded anyone who reported those who had been to Wuhan, but not recorded in official documents at least 1,000 yuan RMB. In Meizhou, residents reporting people entering from Hunan were awarded thirty face masks.

It was reported that on a scheduled 27 January China Southern Airlines flight from Nagoya to Shanghai, some Shanghainese travellers refused to board with 16 others from Wuhan. Two of the Wuhan travellers were unable to board due to a fever while the Shanghainese on the spot alleged that the others had taken medicine to bypass the temperature check. One of the Wuhan tourists protested on Weibo, "are they really my compatriots?" which a Shanghai tourist who was purportedly at the scene replied that they did it to protect Shanghai from the virus. Many netizens criticized the Wuhan tourists for travelling with a fever, although some also called for understanding and for Shanghainese not to regionally discriminate.

In March and April 2020, media outlets reported instances of xenophobia towards foreigners, although according to The Globe and Mail on 10 April, Chinese officials denied the existence of any such discrimination within China. It has been attributed to fears of a second wave of the coronavirus, although the Chinese vice-foreign minister noted that ninety percent of imported COVID-19 cases were PRC nationals returning from overseas. According to The Daily Telegraph, foreigners are being barred from hotels, supermarkets, and restaurants, while others have had their visas cancelled and reentry into China barred. The Guardian reported on 29 March of foreigners being shouted at by local residents, avoided in public places, and sometimes scolded as "foreign trash". Shanghaiist has referenced stories of foreigner misbehaviour circulating on the Chinese internet as playing a role in the increased xenophobia. A comic posted on Weibo depicts people in hazmat suits disinfecting foreigners and throwing them in waste bins.

In April 2020, several reports emerged in Guangzhou of African nationals being evicted from their homes by local police and told to leave, with no place to sleep, amidst some recent Chinese news articles negatively reporting on Nigerians in the city. The reports of discrimination created controversy in Africa damaging Sino-African relations, and sparked a diplomatic crisis, with African governments and diplomats speaking out against the incidents in Guangzhou. The Nigerian legislator Oloye Akin Alabi posted a video of his confronting the PRC's ambassador Zhou Pingjian over the alleged mistreatment of Nigerians in the city. The governments of Ghana, Kenya, and Uganda have also asked for explanations from the PRC government, and the African Union Commission invited the PRC ambassador to the African Union to discuss the mistreatment allegations. The African ambassadors summarised the complaints in an official protest letter demanding the cessation of reported ejection from hotels or apartments, forced testing and quarantine, the seizure of passports, and threats of visa revocation, arrest or deportation of Africans particularly in the Guangdong province. In response, Chinese authorities issued measures discouraging Guangzhou businesses and rental houses from refusing people based on race or nationality and encouraged foreigners to report discrimination to a 24-hour hotline. Some locals coordinated food donations and listed available hotels online to African residents.

China initially placed land mines in selected regions along its border with Myanmar, which were later replaced by a barbed wire fence along 1,000 kilometers of the Myanmese border, for the stated goal of reducing cross-border COVID-19 infections. Other government sources suggested that pandemic restrictions were secondary to a desire to block the transmission of foreign ideas across the once-porous border region, citing a desire to specifically restrict the flow of Christianity and Buddhism into China.

=== Hong Kong ===
More than a hundred restaurants in Hong Kong turned away customers from mainland China, with one restaurant demanding that a customer produce a Hong Kong identity card to prove they were not from the mainland. Tenno Ramen, a Japanese noodle restaurant in Hung Hom, refused to serve mainland Chinese customers. The restaurant said on Facebook, "We want to live longer. We want to safeguard local customers. Please excuse us." Another example is Kwong Wing Catering, a pro-2019–20 Hong Kong protests restaurant chain, which announced on Facebook on 28 January 2020 that it would serve only English- or Cantonese-speaking customers (no Mandarin-speakers customers allowed) since the government did not implement a border closure against mainland China. However, Mandarin is also the common tongue in Taiwan, so the said Facebook post was then updated a day later to clarify that they welcome Taiwanese customers.

Many protesters in Hong Kong have reportedly insisted on calling COVID-19 the "Chinese Virus" or "Chinese coronavirus". Expats and South Asian minorities have also faced increased xenophobia, with media narratives blaming them as more likely to spread the virus.

=== Indonesia ===
The Foreign Policy reported that "On social media, Twitter, Facebook, and Instagram posts encourage people to stay away from places where Chinese citizens or Chinese-heritage Indonesians work and live. ... Major media outlets are also complicit in spreading anti-Chinese conspiracies." Several Indonesian Muslims online have also linked the virus with China's mistreatment of Uighur Muslims, and that it is "an azab (punishment) from Allah".

A demonstration was staged outside a hotel in Bukittinggi, rejecting the visit of tourists from Southern China who stayed there amid fear of coronavirus. The demonstrators demanded that the tourists be isolated in an airport, and displayed distrust over screening tools in airports. It ended after police guaranteed that the tourists would stay in the hotel up to the following day, when the tourists depart from the city.

In a press release, the embassy of Japan in Indonesia said incidents of discrimination and harassment toward Japanese people had increased in the midst of the pandemic, and announced they had set up a help center to assist Japanese residents dealing with these incidents. In general, there have been reports of widespread anti-Japanese discrimination and harassment in the country, with hotels, stores, restaurants, taxi services and more refusing Japanese customers, and many Japanese people were no longer allowed in meetings and conferences. The embassy of Japan has also received at least a dozen reports of harassment toward Japanese people in just a few days. The Ministry of Foreign Affairs (Japan) said anti-Japanese discrimination was on the increase in the country.

=== India ===
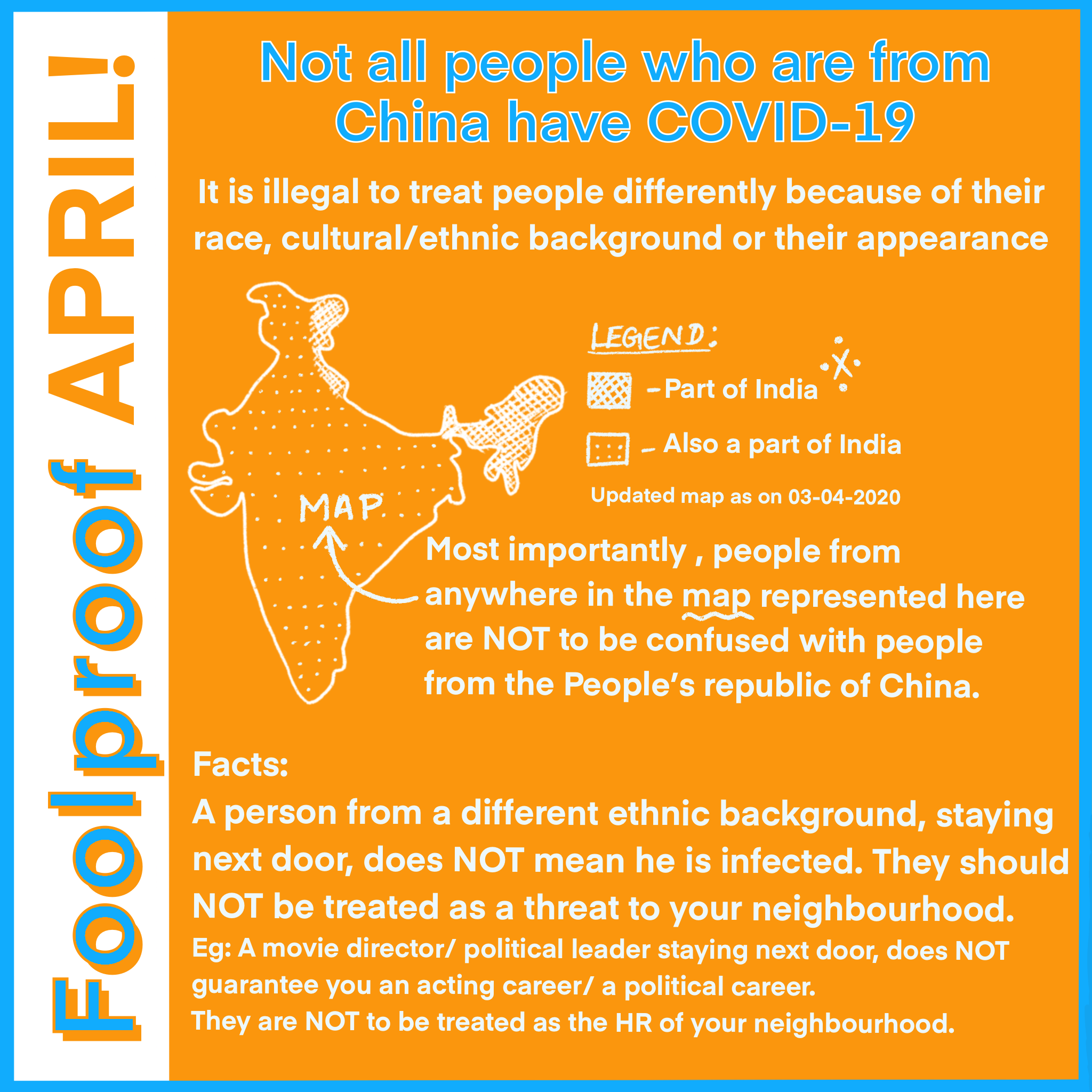
A poster from India for spreading awareness about racism and xenophobia related to COVID-19

People from Northeastern India have reportedly faced increased discrimination and harassment due to their "Chinese" appearance. Northeast Indian students in Kirori Mal College, Delhi, have filed a complaint to college authorities about harassment in the hands of other students over the fears of coronavirus. Eight students from Northeast India at the Tata Institute of Social Sciences in Mumbai also alleged that they were subjected to racism and harassment.

A survey by The Takshashila Institution found that 52.8% of Indian respondents felt terms such as "Chinese Virus" and "Made in China Pandemic" were not racist or stigmatising to the country. The Bharatiya Janata Party's State unit president in West Bengal Dilip Ghosh said the Chinese had "destroyed nature" and "that's why the God took revenge against them." The remarks were later condemned by the Chinese consulate in Kolkata, calling them "erroneous".

In March 2020, foreigners from Europe, the United States, and Israel started facing xenophobia and discrimination, including evictions from rented homes.

Muslim gatherings organised by the Tablighi Jamaat has resulted in large increased of cases in India, which has triggered Islamophobic reactions and increased communal tension. Islamophobic hashtags began circulating shortly after the news broke in late March, and a wave of anti-Muslim violence was reported in April. In Jharkhand, hospitals refusing to treat Muslim patients because coronavirus-related Islamophobia have led to the deaths of at least two newborn babies.

There have been a few reports of increased anti-Christian violence and discrimination amidst the coronavirus lockdown.

=== Iran ===
The Iranian government blamed the country's outbreak on "Zionists", with the Islamic Revolutionary Guard Corps (IRGC) of Iran claiming that Israel released the virus as a form of biological warfare. These claims were seen to be antisemitic by American academic Walter Russell Mead and some Jewish organisations, including the Anti-Defamation League (ADL).

According to the Japan's Ministry of Foreign Affairs, Japanese people have been denied entry to restaurants and experienced increased abuse since the pandemic.

=== Israel ===
More than 1,000 South Korean tourists were instructed to avoid public places and remain in isolation in their hotels. The Israeli military announced its intention to quarantine some 200 South Korean nationals to a military base. Many of the remaining South Koreans were rejected by hotels and were forced to spend nights at Ben Gurion Airport. An Israeli newspaper subsequently published a Korean complaint that "Israel is Treating [Korean and other Asian] Tourists Like Coronavirus". Public health expert Dr. Hagai Levine said Israeli politicians may be overreaching to impress voters.

On 14 March 2020, an Indian man from the Bnei Menashe community was attacked and beaten by two Israeli men in Tiberias who called him "Chinese" and shouted "Corona" during the attack. The man was hospitalized at the Baruch Padeh Medical Center near Tiberias.

=== Japan ===
In Japan, the hashtag #ChineseDontComeToJapan had been trending on Twitter; furthermore, on Twitter, Japanese people have called Chinese tourists "dirty", "insensitive", and "bioterrorists".

A server at a restaurant in Ito, a Japanese city on the Izu Peninsula south of Tokyo, was recorded shouting at a tourist "China! Out!" A Chinese woman, who was the target of the outburst, immediately left the restaurant.

A confectionery shop in Hakone, Kanagawa Prefecture, put up a sign saying "No Chinese allowed!" prompting Chinese citizens to boycott the store.

According to an Ipsos MORI poll conducted in February 2020, 28% of Japanese respondents said they would consider avoiding people of Chinese origin in the future to protect themselves from coronavirus.

Ueno Sanji, a ramen restaurant in Tokyo has banned foreigners from dining there, with the owner claiming that he is doing so to protect his family, employees and regular customers.

Kimi Onoda, a Liberal Democratic Party Councillor from Okayama Prefecture, tweeted, in reference to stimulus by the Government of Japan, that only adults with Japanese citizenship should be eligible, and not non-citizens who paid taxes in Japan. In response to the tweet, people who perceived it as racism launched a petition to demand Onoda's resignation from the Diet on Change.org.

=== Jordan ===
In March 2020, a Korean working in Jordan since 2014 reported to the police that he was beaten and mocked because he was suspected of having the COVID-19 virus. An incident of a Korean working in Jordan, who was not allowed into a taxi for similar reasons was also reported.

According to Japan's Ministry of Foreign Affairs, there have been incidents of Japanese people in Jordan being chased by locals since the pandemic started.

=== Kazakhstan ===
In February 2020, a conflict broke out between ethnic Kazakhs and Chinese Muslims. According to The Diplomat, "In the hours following the incident, fake news about 'ruthless pogroms in Kazakhstan around the spreading of coronavirus' circulated around social media, fueling hysteria in other parts of the country."

=== Kuwait ===
To address the deficit in the capacity at Kuwaiti hospitals to help in the COVID-19 outbreak, Kuwaiti actress Hayat Al-Fahad called for the deportation of migrant workers or to "throw them in the desert". Her comments generated both outrage and support on social media in Kuwait.

=== Malaysia ===
A petition in Malaysia calling for citizens from China to be banned from entering the country claimed that the "new virus is widely spread throughout the world because of their unhygenic lifestyle". The petition was reportedly signed by just over 250,000 people within a week.

Islamophobia also occurs since March when social media users insult groups of Tabligh people as the cluster related to Sri Petaling Tabligh gathering cause it to experiencing sudden jump in number of cases in Malaysia.

According to Human Rights Watch and the Asia Pacific Refugee Rights Network, more than 700 foreign migrant workers and refugees including stateless Rohingya refugees have been detained by Malaysian police during the coronavirus pandemic. Police have claimed that the arrests were intended to prevent undocumented migrants from traveling to other areas as part of lockdown movement restrictions. In response to the arrests, the United Nations in Malaysia's Head of Communications and Advocacy, Ahmad Hafiz Osman, to avoid detaining refugees and not to hinder them from seeking medical treatment. The Home Affairs Minister Hamzah Zainuddin had earlier described the Rohingya as "illegal immigrants", who "have no status, right and basis to present any demands to the government".

In addition, there have been incidents of xenophobia against Rohingya refugees in Malaysia, such as Malaysian politicians and locals expressing violent hate speech online, accusing the Rohingya of committing crimes and dominating parts of the capital Kuala Lumpur. Names and photos of activists have been circulated on social media, and there have been several online petitions calling for the deportation of Rohingya on Change.org. This surge in hostility has been fueled by negative perceptions about Rohingya refugees and inflammatory news stories on social media. According to The Star newspaper, there were also reports of Rohingya individuals making racially tinged and provocative comments in social media videos targeting the Malay ethnicity community, which have strained relations between the two ethnic communities. Rohingya community spokespersons have said the community is living in state of fear while the NGOs Mercy Malaysia and the Malaysian Relief Agency urged the public to show empathy and mercy towards the refugees during Ramadan. On 11 May 83, human rights and civil society organisations including Human Rights Watch, Amnesty International, Article 19, and the International Committee of Jurists called on Prime Minister Muhyiddin Yassin to address online hate speech and violent threats against Rohingya refugees.

On 21 June, Malaysian human rights NGO Aliran raised concerns about the living and working conditions of foreign migrant workers, many of whom had become infected with COVID-19. Aliran also criticised "inflammatory" media coverage for fueling xenophobia and hostility against migrant workers.

On 25 June, the Kuala Lumpur City Hall restricted refugees' access to the city's wholesale market, allowing them entry only if they possessed valid permits and were accompanied by Malaysians. The City Hall does not recognise identity cards issued by the United Nations High Commissioner for Refugees. This ruling was criticised by Yemen Refugee Union representative Dr Mohammed Al Radhi and Alliance of Chin Refugees coordinator James Bawi Thang Bik as discriminatory and inhumane towards refugee communities.

On 27 June, Prime Minister Muhyiddin Yassin said Malaysia could not accommodate more Rohingya refugees due to a struggling economy and dwindling resources. Malaysia does not recognise their refugee status and has turned away incoming boats and detained hundreds of refugees. The Prime Minister also called upon the United Nations High Commissioner for Refugees to speed up the resettlement of Rohingya refugees in third party countries.

In early July 2020, an Al Jazeera documentary titled "Locked Up in Malaysia's Lockdown" alleged that illegal migrants and foreign workers had subjected to racism and mistreatment by Malaysian authorities during the country's lockdown. The Malaysian Government criticised the documentary as "misleading" and "inaccurate", with Senior Minister Ismail Sabri Yaakob demanding an apology from the news network. The Royal Malaysian Police have launched an investigation into the documentary while the Immigration Department of Malaysia have sought to question a Bangladeshi migrant interviewed in the documentary. In response, several civil society organisations including the Centre for Independent Journalism issued a statement calling on the Malaysian Government to cease intimidating media and to protect the rights of migrant workers. The Bangladeshi migrant, who was identified as Mohammad Rayhan Kaybir, was subsequently deported to Bangladesh on 22 August.

=== Palestine ===
On 1 March 2020, a Palestinian mother with her daughter chanted "corona, corona" to the two Japanese women who were in Ramallah for non-governmental aid mission. The mother then attacked and pulled the hair of one of the Japanese women who attempted to record the incident. According to the Embassy of Japan, there have been at least another ten reports of anti-Japanese incidents related to the pandemic, as of early March.

=== Philippines ===
Various Filipino-Chinese advocacy groups have warned that racism against the Chinese community has risen after the outbreak has started. The Federation of Filipino Chinese Chambers of Commerce and Industry, Inc and the Trade Union of Congress of the Philippines have condemned anti-Chinese propaganda with links to the virus. Adamson University, a prominent Catholic school in Manila, received online backlash for ordering all its Chinese students to quarantine themselves amid the new coronavirus outbreak. A crematorium refused to handle the corpse of a Chinese national who died from the virus.

President Rodrigo Duterte has made appeals to the public to stop discriminating against anyone who merely happens to be of Chinese ancestry.

=== Saudi Arabia ===
Images of a South Asian migrant worker who was dressed as a human hand sanitiser while wearing a face mask for Saudi Aramco went viral online and sparked global outrage and was cited as another example of "coronavirus racism". The company later apologised for the incident.

=== Singapore ===
An online petition urging the government of Singapore to ban Chinese nationals and travellers from China from entering the island country was signed by 125,000 people.

The Ministry of Home Affairs has ordered an investigation against an Islamic teacher, Abdul Halim bin Abdul Karim, after he had posted on Facebook that the coronavirus pandemic was "a retribution by Allah against the Chinese for their oppressive treatment of Muslim Uighurs in Xinjiang". In a separate post, Abdul Halim claimed that Chinese people do not wash properly after defecating and were not as hygienic as Muslims, causing the virus to spread. Home Affairs and Law Minister K. Shanmugam slammed the comments as "silly", "xenophobic" and "thoroughly racist" and is "quite unacceptable from anyone, let alone someone who is supposed to be a religious teacher". The Islamic Religious Council of Singapore said it is aware of the post, which "expresses views that do not represent the Muslim community" and was investigating the matter. In response, Abdul Halim said his Facebook post, written in Malay, was not intended to be racist and did not target "any particular race".

Due to the Indian variant, a 55-year-old Singaporean-Indian female was being attacked for not properly wearing a mask. This has been condemned by several local politicians including Prime Minister Lee Hsien Loong. Xenophobic sentiments toward Indian immigrants in the country reportedly increased as of May 2021, with Minister of Law K. Shanmugam condemning a minority of Singaporeans online for describing Indians as "cockroaches" and "rapists".

=== South Korea ===
More than 760,000 South Korean citizens have signed a petition lobbying the government to ban Chinese tourists from entering the country. The Daegu Lantern Festival posted a notice in English that no foreigners are allowed to visit their festival.

In February 2020, an entrance to a South Korean restaurant in downtown Seoul reportedly had a sign in red Chinese characters stating: "No Chinese Allowed". "No Chinese" signs have been cropping up, and some businesses are banning all foreigners.

=== Sri Lanka ===
A group of Singaporean Chinese tourists were reportedly denied permission to climb the tourist attraction Ella Rock due to their appearance.

=== Taiwan ===
As early as May 2020, an alliance of migrant worker groups called the Migrants Empowerment Network in Taiwan (MENT) protested that some local employers had barred their workers from going outside due to the pandemic.

After Miaoli County recorded 300 cases of COVID-19 within a one-week period involving tech-factory migrant workers, local magistrate Hsu Yao-chang announced on 7 June 2021 that migrant workers in the county were not allowed to leave their living quarters for any reason. Afterwards, local authorities were accused of placing discriminatory restrictions on Southeast Asian workers such as confining them to their dormitories, questioning and threatening them with fines if found on the streets, and in some cases, making them sign documents stating that if they contract COVID-19, they alone would bear the expenses for treatment. On 9 June 2021, Miaoli County also extended the blanket stay-at-home order to caregivers, after locals complained that caregivers were "chatting in groups" while taking their elderly wards outside. The magistrate lifted the ban on 29 June, the same day the Ministry of Labour Affairs released a statement warning that such arbitrary restrictions would be treated as "a criminal offence".

According to a migrant rights group survey cited by The Straits Times in July 2021, more than 60 per cent of Filipino migrant workers said they were no longer allowed to leave their dorms outside of work hours. Some Taiwanese have reportedly made comments that Indonesian workers "are all dangerous" and "have a higher risk of being infected by and transmitting the virus than Taiwanese".

=== Thailand ===
A restaurant in Chiang Mai displayed a sign which read, "We apologize we are not accepting CHINESE customers. Thank you." after a customer left the restaurant upon noticing a group of Chinese people inside. The police demanded that the sign be taken down, but suggested that it could be rewritten in Chinese as "We ran out of food". A similar sign was seen outside a restaurant in Ao Sane Beach in Phuket.

Graffiti artist Headache Stencil reportedly tweeted, "Hey Chink! Please go back to ur shit-eating country. Our government need ur money to keep their power but you all not welcome for us now. #notwelcometothailand #backtourchinklandpls".

Health minister Anutin Charnvirakul made negative comments about "dirty" Westerners, saying they "never shower" and are more likely to spread the virus than Asians. He later apologised for the comments.

In December 2020, Thai Prime Minister Prayuth Chan-ocha said illegal immigration was behind a new wave of COVID-19 infection in the country. Migrant workers from neighboring Myanmar bore the brunt of the blame, including incendiary social media posts advocating violence, such as "wherever you see Myanmar people, shoot them down," and refusal of service across Thai society, with Burmese citizens refused access to buses, motorcycle taxis, and offices. COVID-19 xenophobia also led to a reawakening of anger related to the 18th century destruction by Burmese forces of Ayutthaya, capital of what was then known as Siam, now Thailand. The head of Thailand's COVID-19 task force pleaded for tolerance in a televised broadcast, appealing to common religious values: "Today they are our family ... Both Myanmar and Thai people are Buddhists." In January 2021, however, 19 migrants from Myanmar, all Rohingya Muslims, were arrested at a crowded house near Don Mueang International Airport in Bangkok. Authorities claimed that seven of the allegedly unauthorized migrants had tested positive for the coronavirus.

=== United Arab Emirates ===
Following comments made by Kuwaiti actress Hayat Al-Fahad about the deportation of migrant workers to the desert or to their countries of origin due to COVID-19, Emirati poet Tariq Al-Mehyas clarified Al-Fahad's comments by stating "When we say "migrants" we mean Asians [not Arabs]". He went on to say that Arab workers from countries such as Egypt and Sudan were better than Asian (Indian and Bengali) workers and said Asians in the Gulf are never treated equally with Arabs. When his comments generated widespread outrage in the UAE, he said he was not racist because he had an Asian maid. Al-Mehyas was later arrested by Emirati authorities for inciting hatred.

=== Vietnam ===
Asia Times reported that "A number of Vietnamese hotels and guesthouses have reportedly hung signs on their doors saying Chinese guests are not welcome, while many Vietnamese have gone online to demand the closure of all border crossings with China." Signs suggesting that Chinese customers are not accepted were seen in front of a shop in Phu Quoc and a restaurant in Da Nang.

Anger was also reported due to the increasing number of the infected cases coming from the Muslim community returning from Malaysia following their attendance of the Tablighi Jamaat festival in Sri Petaling mosque, and two to three patients did not obey the self-quarantine law in Vietnam and still attended Islamic events in Ho Chi Minh City, leading to fury and demands to imprison the Muslim population, even among Vietnamese celebrities.

== Europe ==
=== Belgium ===
There have been reports by Asian people of increased racism in Belgium due to the pandemic.

A Belgian woman of Chinese origin was called "coronavirus", threatened, and spat on by five youths in Schaerbeek.

A photograph depicting high school students in Chinese costumes while holding a sign that said "Corona Time" was posted on the official Facebook and Instagram of Sint-Paulusschool Campus College Waregem, a secondary school, in March 2020. One of the students added latex gloves and a medical mask to his attire in reference to the outbreak, while another student stretched her eyes in a racist gesture. The photograph was removed after online backlash. The school released a statement, claiming that the school team and the last-grade students had no intention to be condescending or offensive.

In Brussels, a 22-year-old man punched a 24-year-old Asian man and accused him of being "the cause" of coronavirus in Belgium.

=== Croatia ===
On 15 February 2020, during a Croatian Table Tennis Superleague match which was played in Dubrovnik between the local team Libertas Marinkolora and guest team STK Starr from Varaždin, a number of insulting comments were posted on the official Libertas Marinkolora Facebook page towards a Croatian player of Chinese origin, Tan Ruiwu of STK Starr which referenced the coronavirus. This included a comment by the manager of Libertas Marinkolor Marko Habijanec in which he instructed one of his players (who was facing Tan in the next match) to "Beat this virus". The comments were subsequently deleted. Libertas Marinkolor eventually issued an apology and condemnation of the incident.

=== Denmark ===
In January 2020, Jyllands-Posten received international attention when it published a cartoon depicting the Chinese flag with yellow virus-like figures instead of the usual yellow stars. The Chinese embassy in Denmark demanded an official apology from the newspaper. However, the Danish prime minister, Mette Frederiksen, refused to apologize officially on behalf of the Danish government, declaring that there is freedom of speech in Denmark.

=== Finland ===
Asians in Finland have reported instances of discrimination prompted by the novel coronavirus outbreak in China. Various people with backgrounds in China, Vietnam, and Japan told Yle that they feel to have been subjected to racist treatment since news broke about the virus. On 23 February, Helsinki Times reported that at least one Chinese restaurant in Helsinki had seen a downturn in bookings since the beginning of the coronavirus outbreak. A Chinese supermarket reported a dramatic drop in people coming into the store but an uptick in online sales, with customers opting to have goods delivered to their homes.

=== France ===
Asians in Paris reported an increase in racism and harassment.

French newspaper Le Courrier Picard featured an Asian woman wearing a mask on its front page on 26 January 2020 with a headline "Yellow Alert". The paper also titled an editorial "A New Yellow Peril". The publication drew condemnation from French Asians who started the hashtag #JeNeSuisPasUnVirus (which translates to "I Am Not A Virus"). Other French newspapers called COVID-19 the "Chinese Virus" at the beginning of the outbreak, which could stigmatise people of Chinese descent. Numerous reports indicate a significant increase in harassment and violent attacks toward people of certain Asian origins. Some children of Asian descent were ostracised and mocked over their origins in middle schools near Paris.

Non-Western restaurants, including Chinese, Thai, Cambodian, and Japanese have reported a decline in customers. The scale of the decline typically ranged from thirty to fifty percent.

Many French-Vietnamese reported being subject to harassment since the pandemic began in Wuhan.

South Korean media reported increased animosity toward their nationals.

Japan's public service broadcaster NHK, which provides a list of overseas safety information for travelers, listed anti-Japanese discrimination in February 2020 as a concern when traveling to France and other European countries. Some Japanese nationals reported an increase in anti-Japanese incidents, such as being mocked on the street, being refused taxi service, and least one Japanese restaurant was vandalized. A Japanese actress working for the French company Louis Vuitton received a number of coronavirus-related comments on the company's Instagram page, which the company later deleted. A group of Japanese students on a study tour in Paris received abuse by locals. A group of Japanese citizens were also targeted by acid attacks, prompting the Japanese embassy as well as the foreign ministry to issue a warning to Japanese nationals in France, urging caution. Due to such incidents, a Japanese TV announcer in Paris said it was best not to speak Japanese in public.

=== Germany ===
Numerous racial incidents and discrimination against those of Asian descent in Germany were reported by news media. According to an Ipsos MORI poll in early February, 28% of German respondents would consider avoiding people of Chinese origin in the future to protect themselves from the coronavirus.

The weekly magazine Der Spiegel published a controversial cover which has been considered by some as blaming China for the outbreak and fueling xenophobia.

The Chinese Embassy in Berlin acknowledged a rise in hostile cases against its citizens since the outbreak. On 1 February 2020, a 23-year-old Chinese citizen in Berlin reportedly received racist insults and was subsequently beaten by two unknown assailants, in an incident classified by police as "xenophobic".

A Chinese student from Chengdu living in Berlin was given two weeks notice to leave her sublet apartment by her landlord, German actress Gabrielle Scharnitzky. Scharnitzky defended her actions, stating "I had to protect myself against a real possible danger of infection by a person returning from a virus-contaminated area, entering and leaving my home and thus endangering my health and the health of my visitors". The student reportedly informed Scharnitzky in January of her intentions to visit China, though this trip never took place.

On 5 February 2020, a Chinese woman in Berlin, who had not visited China in three months, was reportedly turned away by her gynecologist, claiming the coronavirus may infect pregnant women in the clinic. In the same month, a Chinese student in Essen with a sore throat was denied an appointment by a general practitioner over coronavirus fears, despite not having been to China since September 2019. She was instead told to go the emergency room, where she was diagnosed with bronchitis.

In Munich, a German woman of Chinese descent was assaulted by a neighbor, who sprayed her with disinfectant, screamed "Corona" at her, and threatened to cut her head off. The man is facing charges of assault and threat; the state protection department is investigating a possible racist motive for the crime. A restaurant run by a well-known chef announced a ban on people of Chinese descent.

German football club RB Leipzig denied entry to a group of twenty Japanese fans over coronavirus fears. In Nuremberg, locals threw raw eggs at homes owned by Japanese residents. According to the Ministry of Foreign Affairs (Japan), anti-Japanese discrimination has been rising in Germany.

The embassy of South Korea in Germany warned its citizens of rising anti-Korean violence. In February 2021, a Bayern3 radio host apologized for comparing the worldwide popularity of the South Korean K-pop group BTS to "some crappy virus that hopefully there will be a vaccine for soon as well". The incident prompted many South Koreans living abroad to express concerns that such remarks would further incite racist violence against them.

In Hamburg, a German family of Turkish descent received a threatening letter that allegedly contains the coronavirus.

A 2021 Institute for Strategic Dialogue report for the European Commission found an increase in antisemitic posts on the German-language Telegram, with narratives recasting COVID-19 as a "Zionist bioweapon". Flyers were spread in Germany blaming Jews for the pandemic.

=== Hungary ===
Chinese-owned businesses, including those in the predominantly Asian Józsefváros Market in Budapest, have reported a significant drop in sales, which owners have attributed to the coronavirus. Some businesses have opted to signal to potential customers that they are from another Asian country.

Antisemitic comments have been documented on Hungarian social media alleging that the coronavirus was created by Jews in the US or Zionists in Israel to rule the world. To a lesser extent, some comments also blamed the Chinese for the virus, calling them "yellow Jews" or "the Jews of the East".

=== Ireland ===
On 8 August 2020, two men of Chinese origin, Martin Hong and Arthur Ma, were attacked in a physical and verbal racist assault whilst shopping in a supermarket in Cork County Cork. The assault happened after Martin and Arthur were racially abused by a group of teenagers who were shouting "Chinese virus". Hong and Ma asked the teenagers to repeat what they said after removing their phones, to which the teenagers responded by violently punching the pair. An elderly woman raised the alarm by contacting Gardaí. Hong and Ma spent six hours receiving medical care after the pair were admitted to Cork University Hospital. Gardaí later issued a statement about the incident which was confirmed and they said they were following a "definite line of enquiry".

On 14 August 2020 Gardaí Síochána are investigating a racist verbal and physical assault in Dublin County Dublin after a video, which was posted on two separate TikTok accounts of an Asian woman Xuedan (Shelley) Xiong being filmed, being pushed into the Royal Canal between Castleknock and Ashtown by a group of boys who raced towards her on bicycles, as if to push her into the canal after she confronted them for making racial slurs by shouting "Coronavirus" towards her. The video was deleted along with the accounts, which were suspended. Xiong is now afraid to leave her home. Xiong was heard telling the group "not to racially discriminate, that's criminal" before some of the boys pushed her into the canal some of the boys were heard mocking her screams and laughing as they cycled off. Gardaí Síochána said the boys are unlikely to be charged or cautioned.

On 4 November 2020, an account alleged to belong to Rebecca Barrett, wife of National Party leader Justin Barrett, tweeted racist remarks towards Dublin mayor Hazel Chu. Responding to a Tweet where Chu said she was awake watching the results of the 2020 United States presidential election, the account replied "Since you're up anyway, we'll have a sweet and sour chicken, a szechuan beef and two fried rice please. No bat." The tweet was later removed by Twitter.

In March 2021, a 51-year-old Asian woman was attacked by a dozen male teenagers on Henry Street in Dublin, who circled her, hit her, threw a rubbish bag in her face, filmed her with their phones, and used a racial slur. She stated that, "This is just the latest in the chain of violence and hate crime I've witnessed and [been] subjected to on the streets of Dublin."

=== Italy ===
La Repubblica reported that the director of Rome's prestigious Santa Cecilia music conservatory, Roberto Giuliani, suspended lessons for all students of East Asian origin – Chinese, Japanese and Koreans, with the Chinese being the largest group affected – due to the epidemic. Though it was noted that many of the students were second-generation immigrants.

According to The Washington Post, people especially from South Korea and China experienced increased mockery and discrimination.

It was posted on social media that a bar around the Trevi Fountain had a sign not allowing entrance to anyone from China because of "international safety measures". It was later removed by police.

Dozens of Chinese stores were vandalized in the northern towns of Como, Brescia, and Varese. Many Chinese stores reported a decline in business.

People of Chinese descent, as well as those of Filipino origin who were perceived as being "Chinese" reported assaults (some serious enough to require hospitalization), harassment, and being refused services. Some public officials asked students of Chinese/East Asian origin to stay home.

On 24 February 2020, a Chinese man was barred from entering a gas station in Cassola in Vicenza, Veneto and was told "You have coronavirus, you cannot enter!" at which point somebody broke a bottle on his head causing severe injuries. The same day, an elderly Filipino pensioner was attacked and punched in a supermarket in the town of Mariano Comense, in Como, Lombardy. Singer and TV personality Francesco Facchinetti was seen intervening and defending the victim.

Veneto regional governor Luca Zaia apologized after claiming the Chinese eat live mice.

On 8 March 2020, a Japanese restaurant in Rivoli, in Torino, Piedmont was the target of an arson attack by a group of teens who taunted the owners, calling them carriers of the epidemic.

=== Netherlands ===
The Dutch public broadcaster NOS reported in early 2020 that a large number of "racist, discriminatory, and anti-Chinese comments" were being posted under its Facebook and Instagram posts about the coronavirus. Dutch residents of Asian descent similarly reported being called out as carriers of the coronavirus during their commute, in the supermarket, at school, and on social media.

On 6 February 2020, radio DJ Lex Gaarthuis presented his Carnaval song "Voorkomen is beter dan Chinezen" (a pun on the proverb Voorkomen is beter dan genezen – "prevention is better than cure" – with Chinezen referring to both Chinese people and eating Chinese food) on national radio station Radio 10 under his alter ego Toon, which includes the lyrics "we can't have the virus in our country, it is all caused by these stinking Chinese people" and "don't eat Chinese food". After many complaints were issued against Radio 10 and Gaarthuis, primarily by the Chinese community in the Netherlands, both the station and artist made formal apologies, with Gaarthuis saying the song was meant to be satirical but had overshot its mark. Ironically, the virus was spread significantly during the Carnaval period.

On 8 February 2020, a group of Chinese students living in a student dormitory of Wageningen University discovered that their floor had been vandalized. Damages included a Chinese flag torn from a student's door and shredded, and walls defaced with English language insults such as "Die, Chinese" and "Chinese Corona". Dutch police investigated the incident, but did not identify any suspects.

On 10 February 2020, a 65-year-old Dutch man of Chinese descent was kicked off his bicycle in Amsterdam by two young men on a scooter. One of the culprits filmed the incident and uploaded it to his Snapchat story. He later downplayed criticism saying "don't you worry guys, it was a Chinese man", but turned himself in to police after becoming the target of widespread Internet vigilantism.

On a KLM flight from Amsterdam to Seoul on 11 February 2020, flight attendants put up a sign in Korean discouraging passengers from using a restroom on the plane allegedly reserved for the flight crew, apparently out of fear of the coronavirus. A spokesman for the airline issued an apology, stating "we are deeply sorry that this was viewed as discrimination, which was absolutely not the intention of the crew" and that it is not company policy to reserve specific lavatories for flight crew. Many Koreans and Dutch people of Korean descent reported a spate of anti-Korean incidents in early 2020, ranging from vandalism to their homes to violent attacks and harassment. More than 150 Korean expats indicated in an online survey that they had experienced a xenophobic incident.

On the evening of 22 February 2020, a 24-year-old Dutch student of Chinese descent was assaulted by a group of students in her dormitory in Tilburg, suffering a concussion and knife wounds, after she asked them to stop singing Gaarthuis' Carnaval song.

In late February 2020, the Japanese School of Amsterdam cautioned parents not to bring their children to playgrounds and other places frequented by local children, amidst a spate of violent bullying incidents targeting Japanese children.

On 16 March 2020, a residence in Diemen was smeared with words reading "Kankerchinees corona" ("cancerous Chinese corona" in English), which was publicly denounced by Mayor Erik Boog.

On 21 June 2020, a teenager of Korean descent fell victim to a group assault in a Zaandam park. The teen was kicked in the head, blamed for the coronavirus, and one of his assailants attempted to steal a mobile phone. On 4 July, a 16-year-old boy was arrested on suspicion of attempted manslaughter. Police questioned a 13-year-old boy who had filmed the incident and the Public Prosecution Service indicated that it did not rule out further arrests.

=== Poland ===
In May 2020, the Polish-based "NEVER AGAIN" Association published its report titled "The Virus of Hate: The Brown Book of Epidemic". It documented acts of racism, xenophobia and discrimination that occurred in the wake of coronavirus in Poland. The 40 pages long report recorded numerous attacks on the representatives of minorities on the background of accusations of spreading the virus, as well as cases of spreading hate speech and conspiracy theories about the epidemic by the extreme right.

=== Russia ===
In Moscow and Yekaterinburg, Chinese nationals are targeted by quarantine enforcing campaigns, as well as police raids, which were condemned as racial profiling.

In Blagoveshchensk, at least one hotel has barred Chinese nationals from booking rooms, and markets operated by people of Chinese origin have seen their sales plummeting.

According to an Ipsos MORI poll conducted in February 2020, 37% of Russian respondents would consider avoiding people of Chinese origin, the highest of the eight countries surveyed. On the other hand, an October 2020 poll from the Central European Institute of Asian Studies found that Russian respondents were the least likely to blame China for COVID-19 out of the 13 European countries surveyed.

=== Sweden ===
It was reported on 20 May 2020 that a Chinese student and his girlfriend were racially harassed and assaulted in Stockholm due to wearing masks. A man hit the couple in the face and head, which resulted in injuries for both victims, including a concussion for the female victim. Individuals have been bullied, forced to leave public transportation and physically abused.

An October 2020 poll from the Central European Institute of Asian Studies had more than half of Swedish respondents agreeing that COVID-19 spread due to Chinese people eating bats and other wild animals, which was a higher percentage than the other 12 European countries surveyed.

=== Turkey ===
While in 2019, a poll estimated that 83.2% of Turks wanted all Syrian refugees returned, the pandemic caused a further rise of xenophobia and anti-refugee sentiment in Turkey. A couple of religious news outlets have reported a spike in attacks on Turkish churches, with some scapegoating Christians for the coronavirus crisis in Turkey. Some Israeli researchers and Jewish Turks reported in 2020 that antisemitic conspiracy theories blaming Jews for COVID-19 were spreading on Turkish social media.

=== United Kingdom ===
On 12 February 2020, Sky News reported that some British Chinese said they were facing increasing levels of racist abuse. It was recorded that hate crimes against British Chinese people between January and March 2020 have tripled the number of hate crimes in the past two years in the UK. According to the London Metropolitan Police, between January and June 2020, 457 race-related crimes against British East and Southeast Asians.

Verbal abuse has been one of the common forms of racism experienced by British Chinese. Just before the lockdown in February 2020, British Chinese children recalled experiences of fear and frustration due to bullying and name calling in their schools. According to a June 2020 poll, 76% of British Chinese had received racial slurs at least once, and 50% regularly received racial slurs, a significantly higher frequency than experienced by any other racial minority.

Anti-Chinese racism has also had effects on Chinese-owned businesses. Many, including the busy Chinese takeaway segment and businesses in Chinatown, London recorded significantly reduced customers in the aftermath of the coronavirus outbreak compared to usual elevated sales related to Chinese New Year celebrations, due to fears of coronavirus spreading through food or unhygienic working practices.

In London, a student of the Royal Holloway University was verbally abused by train passengers at Clapham Junction station, while a similar incident was reported by passengers on the London Underground. On 30 January 2020, a postgraduate student walking alone while wearing a face mask on West Street in Sheffield city centre, towards the University of Sheffield, was verbally abused and nudged by three people.

Tottenham Hotspur footballer Dele Alli posted a video on Snapchat where he wore a face mask and appeared to mock an Asian man seated near him in Dubai about the coronavirus outbreak. He later apologised and deleted the video.

A 24-year-old Thai tax consultant in London was violently assaulted and robbed by two teenagers yelling "coronavirus" at the man. In Solihull, a woman of Chinese origin was allegedly called "a dirty Chink" and told "Take your fucking coronavirus back home!" A woman of Indian origin who tried to intervene was beaten up and later hospitalised.

On 24 February 2020, a Singaporean Chinese student at University College London was beaten up when walking past a group who shouted "I don't want your coronavirus in my country". He suffered fractures on his face and bruises on his eye. Two teenagers have been arrested in relation to the incident. One of the teenagers was sentenced to serve an 18-month youth rehabilitation order on 28 January 2021.

In March 2020, in Exeter, there had been six separate racially motivated physical assaults against Asian people, including three assaults against Chinese teenagers reported in a 24-hour period.

A Vietnamese art curator was dropped as an assistant for an exhibit of contemporary Vietnamese fine art at the Affordable Art Fair. Raquelle Azran, the dealer in charge of the exhibit, explained in an email that she could no longer participate because "Asians are being seen as carriers of the virus" and that the presence of a Vietnamese curator "would unfortunately create hesitation on the part of the audience to enter the exhibition space".

An NHS nurse of Asian descent stated she was assaulted and racially abused by a couple at a train station during her commute for a nightshift at a hospital. In February 2021, a University of Southampton lecturer of Chinese descent was beaten by a group of men and had various racist slurs yelled at him.

Some right-wing social media users have spread Islamophobic conspiracy theories and fake videos of Muslims flouting social distancing measures and being prone to spreading the virus.

According to a study carried out by the University of Oxford in early 2020, nearly one-fifth of respondents in England believed to some extent that Jews were responsible for creating or spreading the virus with the motive of financial gain. Peter Hotez detailed in a 2023 journal article the convergence of antivaccine sentiment and antisemitism, where he reported on being targeted, this convergence was also detailed in a British cross-sectional study published in December 2023.

=== Romanis ===
Slovakia, Romania, and Bulgaria have each allegedly taken "disproportionate or militarized measures" against communities of Romani people during the pandemic, targeting their towns and villages as part of a racially charged narrative that the Romani are unclean and diseased. Media organizations in these nations have also sometimes taken discriminatory stances, with one Romanian media outlet claiming that Romani people were disease reservoirs, having genetic resistance to COVID-19 themselves, yet able to pass it on to others. Meanwhile, in Hungary, Romani leaders have claimed that they have been left out of the nation's aggressive COVID-19 immunization drive and thus were forced to organize their own community initiatives to spur lagging vaccination rates.

== North America ==
=== Canada ===
A national report, funded by the Government of Canada and conducted as a collaboration with the Chinese Canadian National Council – Toronto Chapter, Project 107, Vancouver Asian Film Festival and the Chinese Canadian National Council for Social Justice, revealed there were 600 documented anti-Asian incidents reported in the country since the start of the pandemic. It revealed that East Asians suffered the most attacks at 83%, followed by Southeast Asians at 7%, South Asians at 2%, mixed-race or biracial Canadians at 1.5% and Indigenous Canadians at 1%.

On 26 January 2020, Peter Akman, a reporter who was with CTV News, tweeted an image of his Asian barber in a mask and said, "Hopefully all I got today was a haircut." He was fired after the tweet was reported.

On 29 January 2020, Theresa Tam, Chief Public Health Officer of Canada and head of the Public Health Agency of Canada, expressed her concern. Tam, who is originally from Hong Kong, tweeted that "I am concerned about the growing number of reports of racism and stigmatizing comments on social media directed to people of Chinese and Asian descent related to 2019-nCoV coronavirus."

The Nation reported on 7 February 2020 that some people of Hong Kong and other Asian diaspora in Canada had been spreading xenophobic stories and rhetoric online against mainland Chinese people.

Several incidents of violent assaults against women of Asian descent have been reported.

According to an Angus Reid Institute/University of Alberta survey on 22 June 2020, 64% of Chinese-Canadian respondents reported some level of disrespect during COVID-19, 50% of them had experienced verbal abuse, and 29% had experienced physical attacks. 64% of respondents also felt coverage from North American news outlets had led to negative views of ethnically Chinese people in Canada.

In Vancouver, anti-Asian hate crimes grew 717% between 2019 and 2020.

==== Alberta ====
In Calgary a man was arrested for spitting on an Asian woman on a longboard at a park and calling her a "stupid chink". The man also spit on a white couple behind the Asian woman.

Also in Calgary, a man was charged with hate crimes for verbally attacking a Chinese-Canadian man with racial slurs.

On 23 December 2021, Alberta Premier Jason Kenney likened the origins of COVID-19 to a "bat soup thing out of Wuhan". Following subsequent criticism for his remarks, Kenney supposedly apologized, allegedly stating "...if anybody did take offence, that I apologize to them, if they took offence, certainly none was intended".

==== British Columbia ====
Chinese-Canadian businesses in Vancouver have reported a drop in business from fifty to seventy percent.

On 13 March 2020, a white man in his 50s yelled racist remarks about COVID-19 towards a 92-year-old Asian man with dementia at a convenience store in Vancouver. The suspect also assaulted the elderly man, which caused the victim to fall and hit his head on the ground.

Vancouver's Chinese Cultural Centre was a target of vandalism, particularly graffiti calling for the death of Chinese people.

On 1 November 2020, a man was filmed threatening a Filipino man on a bus in Vancouver. The man referred to the Filipino man as a "Chinese spy" and threatened to sexually assault his daughter.

According to the Vancouver Police Department the number of anti-Asian hate crimes reported in the months March and April 2020 exceeded the total in 2019. During the first nine months of 2020, the number of anti-Asian hate crimes saw an 878% increase compared to the same period in 2019, from nine to eighty-eight.

A survey of 1,600 adults conducted by ResearchCo and obtained by the Agence France-Presse revealed one in four Canadians of Asian descent (70% of whom were of Chinese descent) who lived in British Columbia knew someone within their household who had faced discrimination. The survey also revealed 24 percent of Canadians of South Asian descent reported racist insults. Canadians of Indigenous origin had also reported discrimination.

On 1 May 2021, at a Burger King in Ironwood Plaza in Richmond, a man standing next to a Chinese family shouted "China virus! Because of you the world is like this! Go back to your country", causing a bystander to shout "Get the fuck out", to which the attacker responded with further racist abuse.

==== Ontario ====
In the Greater Toronto Area, Chinese restaurants have reported a drop in sales of thirty to eighty percent.

On 28 January 2020, nine thousand parents of a school district in the York Region, just north of Toronto signed a petition calling on the York Region District School Board to keep students whose family have visited China home from school for seventeen days, and that schools keep track of these students' travels and inform other parents so they could decide whether to pull their kids out of class. The York Region School Board rejected the petition, saying it could potentially stoke racism.

In April 2020, Dipanjan Basu, a University of Waterloo engineering professor posted anti-Chinese messages on his personal Facebook account, for which he later apologized.

In Markham, Ontario, police arrested an individual and charged an individual implicated in six assaults against Asian women.

In another incident in Scarborough, a man was assaulted while ordering food. Anti-Asian statements were uttered by the attacker. Police investigated this as a hate-motivated assault.

==== Quebec ====
In Montreal, vandals targeted Vietnamese Buddhist temples by smashing statues and religious artifacts.

On 17 March 2020, two Korean men were stabbed in Montreal, prompting the Korean Consulate to issue a warning to those of Korean heritage in the city to be cautious and report any incidents to the consulate.

In April 2020, there have been reports of Inuit being harassed and mistaken as Asians in Montreal. They were spat on and told to "go back to China" or "home country".

The SVPM noted a spike in the number of hate crimes and incidents against the Asian community in Montreal in 2020.

==== Hutterites ====
In late-June 2020, a large number of cases involving Hutterites – a communal, self-sufficient ethnoreligious group with a large population in Alberta, Saskatchewan, and Manitoba, began to emerge. While many colonies cooperated with provincial health officials to control these outbreaks, some displayed resistance – which led to the group as a whole becoming stigmatized by the general population and facing discrimination.

After facing the threat of a human rights complaint by a community member, Manitoba announced that it would no longer link COVID-19 cases to Hutterite colonies unless there is risk to the general public. For similar reasons, the Hutterian Safety Council (HSC) criticized Saskatchewan for linking outbreaks to Hutterite colonies where there is no risk to the public – even after it began to use the euphemism "communal living setting" to identify them – considering it a form of "cultural profiling" as no other group had been singled out in this manner. The province's medical officer Saqib Shahab said it was "very important to recognize there will be different settings for transmission", and that the public needed to be aware of where new cases were located.

=== United States ===
COVID-19 Hate Crimes Act
- Long title: To facilitate the expedited review of COVID-19 hate crimes, and for other purposes.
- Enacted by: the 117th United States Congress
- Effective: 20 May 2021

Citations
- Public law: Pub. L. 117–13 (text) (PDF)
- Statutes at Large: 135 Stat. 265

Legislative history
- Introduced in the Senate as S. 937 by Mazie Hirono (D–HI) on 23 March 2021; Passed the Senate on 22 April 2021 (94–1); Passed the House on 18 May 2021 (364–62); Signed into law by President Joe Biden on 20 May 2021

According to a June 2020 Pew Research study 58% of Asian Americans and 45% of African Americans believe that racist views toward them had increased since the pandemic began. A study by the New York University College of Arts & Science found that there was no overall increase of Anti-Asian sentiment among the American population, instead it suggested that "already prejudiced persons" had felt authorized by the pandemic to act openly on their prejudices.

Early calls for blaming China for the pandemic outbreak included derogatory use of the phrases "Chinese flu", "Kung flu" (in reference to Chinese martial arts), or "Wuhan flu", phrases embraced and widely used by then-President Donald Trump and his supporters. There were several thousand incidences of xenophobia and racism against Asian Americans between 28 January and 24 February 2020, according to a tally compiled by Russell Jeung, professor of Asian American Studies at San Francisco State University. An online reporting forum called "Stop AAPI Hate" recorded "650 direct reports of discrimination against primarily Asian Americans" between 18 and 26 March 2020, this later increased to 1,497 reports by 15 April 2020, and most targets were of Chinese (40%) and Korean (16%) descent. By 28 February 2021, it had risen to 3,795. According to a report by Philadelphia radio station WHYY-FM (21 April 2020), incidents of anti-Asian racism in Philadelphia during the pandemic, including discrimination, racial slurs and a violent attack, especially targeted Chinese Americans, and went mostly unreported to the authorities. The article detailed a number of incidents which were caused both by white Americans and African Americans.

Media critique organisation FAIR has documented instances of anti-Asian racism on the street, and reports that many media outlets such as CNN, The Wall Street Journal, and Fox News capitalise on Sinophobia and "Orientalist tropes that the Chinese are inherently sneaky and untrustworthy, and are ruled by an incompetent, authoritarian government that is the 'sick man of Asia'". An article on The Conversation has also noted anti-Chinese sentiments from similar media outlets on their coverage of Chinese wet markets.

The University of California, Berkeley's University Health Services posted an infographic on common reactions to the novel coronavirus epidemic that said "Xenophobia: fears about interacting with those who might be from Asia and guilt about these feelings" is normal. The university was criticized for "normalizing racism".

Former presidential candidate Andrew Yang spoke of an uptick in anti-Asian racism surrounding the coronavirus. In February 2021, Asian American basketball player Jeremy Lin said he had been called "coronavirus" on the court.

Several lawmakers, including members of Congress, denounced xenophobia related to the coronavirus in a press conference. They said Asian American businesses across the country from grocery stores to nail salons and restaurants had been forced into financial crises due to a reduction in customers. Additionally, Asian American businesses have reported coronavirus-related harassment and acts of vandalism.

President Trump frequently referred to SARS-CoV-2 as the "Chinese Virus", "China Virus" and "Kung Flu" (from Kung Fu, Chinese martial arts) in an attempt to point to its origin, a term considered by some to be anti-Chinese and racist. He later argued this was "not racist at all" after lawmakers including Elizabeth Warren raised objections about the statement. Trump also tweeted, on 23 March 2020, that the coronavirus was not Asian Americans' fault and their communities should be protected. CNN commentators Chris Cuomo and Jim Acosta also criticized the use of the term "Wuhan Virus" and "Chinese Virus", although other CNN anchors had used those terms in the past. Trump also brushed off the alleged use of the derogatory term "Kung Flu" by a White House official to refer to COVID-19 when asked by a reporter during a media session on 18 March 2020. Eventually he pulled back on the "Chinese Virus" name due to Asian communities facing increased number of racist taunts and incidents as the illness spread across the U.S. However, at his Tulsa, Oklahoma, rally on 20 June, Trump referred to the virus as "Kung Flu".

Then-U.S. Secretary of State Mike Pompeo referred to the virus as the "Wuhan Virus" and said that there was "a significant amount of evidence" it emerged from the Wuhan Institute of Virology and blamed the Chinese Communist Party for posing "a substantial threat to our health and way of life."

In response to the growing anti-Chinese sentiment, several media outlets and individuals began suggesting that it was not useful to blame Chinese people for the pandemic, and that there was a distinction between the people of China and the Chinese Communist Party (CCP), accused by some of covering up and mishandling the pandemic. A petition to use the name 'CCP virus' was launched with the White House on 20 March 2020.

On 23 March 2020, the Federal Bureau of Investigation's (FBI) New York City office issued an alert reporting that extremists were encouraging one another to intentionally spread the coronavirus to police officers and members of the Jewish community, if they contracted it. That same day, the FBI foiled a terrorist plot by a white supremacist to use a car bomb to blow up a Missouri hospital overflowing with COVID-19 patients, with the man having referenced far-right conspiracy theories that the virus was "engineered by Jews" online before he was shot and killed in an altercation with FBI agents. The next day, the Department of Homeland Security released a memo to law enforcement officials warning of the possibility of violent extremists taking advantage of the pandemic to commit terrorist attacks. The memo cites calls by far-right extremists to commit attacks on Asian Americans and other targets, as well as spread the virus in diverse neighborhoods and places of worship. On 28 March, the FBI warned again that white supremacist groups were plotting to "expose Jewish people to coronavirus" by having members use themselves as bio-weapons" to infect areas Jewish people are deemed likely to visit.

The Anti-Defamation League and Life After Hate observed that in addition to the wave of anti-Asian xenophobia online, there was a white nationalist and white supremacist-fueled wave of antisemitic and anti-Zionism, including but not limited to claims that Jews and/or Israelis were spreading the virus, but also an online campaign to infect Jews with the virus as a means of murder. The ADL was especially concerned with the prevalence of antisemitic messaging on Steam, Discord and TikTok combined with the increased internet usage by children after school closings.

Restaurants in Chinatown in Boston have also lost customers due to fears of coronavirus. The government of New York City cited a report which estimated a forty percent sales drop for Chinese businesses in Flushing, Queens, while other reports suggested the drop ranged from thirty to eighty percent. It has been reported that the number of restaurants in Chinatown in New York, that remained open decreased from 270 to 40.

According to a March 2020 article in The Korea Times, Asians in the U.S. were being attacked both for wearing face-masks and for not wearing them, creating a dilemma for some Koreans as to which was safer, a choice made even more difficult by conflicting mask guidance from the CDC.

At a White House press conference on 10 April 2020, Surgeon General Jerome Adams claimed that people of color were "socially predisposed" to coronavirus exposure. He was also criticized for calling on minority communities to abstain from drugs and alcohol with condescending language: "Do it for your abuela. Do it for your granddaddy, do it for your Big Mama, do it for your pop-pop." Others questioned the validity of the criticism, including Columbia professor John McWhorter, who challenged the ideology demanding that root-cause arguments always be included in statements addressing black Americans, and compared outrage at the Surgeon General's statement to that directed at Barack Obama when he admonished absentee black fathers.

Testifying before a House Energy and Commerce Committee hearing on 23 June 2020, Dr. Anthony Fauci, the director of the National Institute of Allergy and Infectious Diseases, said he believes institutional racism is a contributing factor to the disproportionate effect that the virus has had on African American and other minority communities.

On 17 September 2020, the United States House of Representatives passed a resolution 243–164 condemning racism tied to the pandemic against Asian Americans. On 14 April 2021, the US Senate voted 92–6 to advance the "COVID-19 Hate Crimes Act", which would allow the US Justice Department to review hate crimes related to COVID-19, with a section of the bill (titled the "Khalid Jabara-Heather Heyer NO HATE Act", originally drafted by Senator Richard Blumenthal) dedicated to providing federal grants for states and local governments transitioning to the National Incident-Based Reporting System, authorizing federal grants for states to establish hate crime reporting hotlines, and allowing courts to require individuals convicted under the Matthew Shepard and James Byrd Jr., Hate Crimes Prevention Act to participate in educational programs or community service. On 22 April 2021, the Senate voted 94–1 to pass the COVID-19 Hate Crimes Act with bipartisan changes. It then passed the House of Representatives by a 364–62 vote on 18 May and was signed into law by Biden on 20 May.

U.S. Olympians Sakura Kokumai and Yul Moldauer said they had been targets of hate crimes as of early 2021.

On 28 December 2022, following the abrupt end of China's Zero-COVID policy and subsequent surge of cases, the U.S. instituted a pre-departure testing requirement for all air passengers arriving from China. Since the U.S. had previously abandoned testing of all other foreign arrivals, it was feared that Asians may again become scapegoated in the midst of a pre-existing wintertime surge of cases in the United States.

==== Arizona ====
A man in Page was arrested in April and accused of inciting terrorism. The man is accused of making a social media post that calls for the killing of Navajo people due to COVID-19. The Navajo Nation has been dealing with a COVID-19 outbreak.

In March, Scottsdale city council member Guy Phillips made a private Facebook post claiming COVID stands for "Chinese Originated Viral Infectious Disease", prompting criticism and allegations of racism. Phillips later issued an apology in a letter to the Arizona Republic.

Asian American students at Arizona State University have also reported incidents of racism and xenophobia.

==== Arkansas ====
On 13 March 2021, a Bentonville Fire Department captain confronted a Vietnamese American man outside Oaklawn Racing Casino Resort in Hot Springs, asked him if he knew this was America, made threats, and fought. A security guard separated them but the fire captain ran back to the man, threatened to kill "you and your kind of people", grabbed him by his shirt, pushed him backwards, and punched him. Garland County charged him with public intoxication and third-degree assault. Arkansas has no hate crime statute. The man, Benjamin Snodgrass, later pleaded guilty to assault, disorderly conduct, and public intoxication.

==== California ====
On 13 February 2020, Los Angeles County authorities spoke out against a number of bullying incidents and assaults against the Asian American community, including a middle-schooler being beaten and hospitalized.

On 14 February 2020, bullies physically attacked an Asian American boy, 16, in San Fernando Valley and accused him of having the coronavirus only because he is Asian American. Robin Toma of the Los Angeles County Human Relations Commission stated, "Many may be quick to assume that just because someone is Asian or from China that somehow they are more likely to be carriers of the virus. We need to speak out against this when we see it. We need to speak up, not be bystanders, be upstanders." Other forms of harassment in Los Angeles included fake World Health Organization flyers advising people to avoid Asian American restaurants.

Chinatowns across the state have seen a significant drop in business since the beginning of the pandemic, in particular around the San Francisco Bay Area.

In November 2021, Olympic gold medalist Suni Lee was pepper-sprayed while several people shouted racial slurs at her and a group of other Asian-Americans.

==== Colorado ====
In July 2020, a group of Colorado State University students set up an Instagram account and listings for a fake Chinese restaurant in Fort Collins called "Ching Chong House" with a description playing into various anti-Chinese stereotypes, including a menu with items such as "mouse tail salad" and "marinated ostrich foreheads" that appears to specifically reference the COVID-19 pandemic allegedly originating in a wet market in Wuhan.

==== Connecticut ====
On 3 April 2020, a Chinese restaurant in Seymour received racist phone calls blaming the COVID-19 pandemic on people of Chinese descent and threatening to shoot the owners.

In Stamford, an Asian American woman claimed a cashier sprayed her with Lysol at a supermarket.

A man was arrested for yelling "Go back to China" at a man wearing a mask in Milford. The man then allegedly pointed his vehicle at the other man.

==== Delaware ====
In June 2020, flyers described as "racist and xenophobic" by the University of Delaware were found on vehicles and apartments doors of Asian American students.

==== Florida ====
In mid-March 2020, in Miami Beach, Florida, a rapper named 1KJohnny posted an Instagram video of himself bullying an elderly Asian woman by chasing her with hand sanitizer while shouting, "Sanitize your ass!"

==== Georgia ====
In April 2020, "Wuhan plague" stickers depicting Winnie the Pooh eating a bat were posted on several businesses in Atlanta.

On 16 March 2021, a series of mass shootings occurred at three massage parlors in the metropolitan area of Atlanta. Eight people were killed, six of whom were women of Asian descent, and one person was wounded. The South Korean Foreign Affairs Ministry reported that four of the dead were of Korean ethnicity. According to The Chosun Ilbo, an eyewitness said the shooter said he would "kill all Asians", and some lawmakers and commentators argued that the shootings constituted a hate crime. Various public officials have condemned the shootings and expressed their condolences with the Asian American community, including the president, vice president, several lawmakers, and South Korea's foreign minister.

==== Illinois ====
A 60-year-old Chinese American man was attacked by two women while jogging in Naperville, Illinois. According to his daughter, they allegedly threw a log at him, accused him of having the virus, spat at him, and told him to "go back to China."

==== Indiana ====
Two Hmong men were rejected from two hotels in Indiana because hotel staff thought they might have the virus.

A Korean American doctor born in Louisville, Kentucky, was kicked out of a Marathon Petroleum gas station in Martinsville. The clerk told him he was not allowed to buy anything or use the bathroom, and to never come back.

On 27 February 2021, Ardahbek Amantur, 29, told his passengers while at College Mall in Bloomington that only four people could legally ride in his car and canceled the Uber ride request. A man in the passenger seat refused to leave his car and asked him repeatedly, "Do you eat bats?", got out of the car, tried to tackle him, knocked the victim to the concrete, took Amantur's glasses, which had fallen to the ground, and purposefully smashed them.

On 3 March, Jason Nguyen, a sophomore at Indiana University from Fishers, was at IU's Willkie Campus Store when store workers were debating whether they would vote for one of the workers if he ran for president. Nguyen said, "I'd vote for you" and a worker said, "Oh no, no, no you wouldn't vote for him, because people of your kind ..." then caught himself.

On 11 January 2023, an 18-year-old IU student was stabbed multiple times in a Bloomington Transit bus by a 56-year-old woman, who admitted to attacking Asian Americans intentionally, stating "It would be one less person to blow up our country." The woman, Billie Davis, pleaded guilty to stabbing the student and was sentenced to six years in federal prison.

==== Kansas ====
On 19 March 2020, in Overland Park, Kansas, an Asian American worker was told to move six feet away from her white co-workers at Taben Group. She was the only person in the office asked to distance herself from others due to safety concerns over the COVID-19 pandemic. When the woman filed a complaint of discriminatory treatment, she was fired from the Taben Group.

On 19 March 2021, in Russell, an out-of-state bar patron shouted, "I'm going to kick his ass" and aggressively confronted State Representative Rui Xu, questioning the use of a face mask and asking if he had COVID-19 while accompanied by the owner of the business.

==== Louisiana ====
A police officer in Kaplan, Louisiana, was fired for allegedly making comments on social media about it being "unfortunate" that more black people do not die from COVID-19.

CNN reporter Amara Walker, a Korean American, described three racist incidents that happened to her at the New Orleans International Airport. According to Walker, a man at the airport said "Ni hao, ching chong" to her. She says that when she was at the terminal, a different man asked her if she spoke English and mocked Asian languages. When an airport officer came to the terminal, Walker says that the officer stated that asking someone if they speak English is not racist.

==== Maine ====
A homeless man in Portland was arrested in March 2021 for harassing an Asian woman and her daughter and damaging the woman's car. Police say they are investigating the incident as a hate crime.

==== Maryland ====
In Howard County, six restaurants, four of which were Asian-owned, were burglarized on Lunar New Year 2021.

In May 2021 in Baltimore, two women who were closing shop were reportedly assaulted by a 50-year-old man with a cinder block. The women were elderly, in their late sixties. One got 25 stitches to her head. The man faces assault charges, but hate crime charges were not yet filed. The man, Daryl Doles, was found guilty of multiple assaults and sentenced to life in prison, with all but 30 years suspended.

==== Massachusetts ====
After a Chinese American anesthesiology resident left work from Massachusetts General Hospital, a man followed her and yelled profanities and racial verbal abuse, saying, "Why are you Chinese people killing everyone?" and "What is wrong with you? Why the fuck are you killing us?" Another anesthesiology resident who is of Chinese and Filipino descent was yelled at by a man on the subway, "Fuck China! Fuck the Chinese!"

An internal medicine resident at Beth Israel Deaconess Medical Center in Boston said a frustrated patient at another hospital repeatedly told her to "go back to your country."

==== Michigan ====
In Lansing, a child at the Reopen Michigan protest danced in blackface resembling former President Barack Obama on the steps of the Michigan State Capitol building.

==== Minnesota ====
In Woodbury in March 2020, a threatening racist note was left on the home of an Asian American couple with statements such as "we're watching you" and "take the Chinese virus back to China".

In Moorhead in April 2020, a man was arrested for coughing on two grocery store employees while blaming racial minorities for COVID-19.

In September 2020, the words "China virus" were burned onto the front yard of an Austin man of Chinese heritage.

==== Missouri ====
In Eureka, Missouri, a restaurant displayed a racist coronavirus-shaped piñata, which featured an Asian caricature wearing a conical hat and Fu Manchu mustache. These piñatas circulated in parts of Mexico and the U.S. in March 2020.

==== Nebraska ====
Leirion Gaylor Baird, the Mayor of Lincoln, Nebraska, said there are racial and ethnic disparities in the city. There were also an increase of hateful and racist incidents toward Asian Americans. This also includes outright racist acts, very aggressive behavior, a lot of staring and remarks to neighbors about staying away from people. One staff member of the Asian Community and Cultural center of Lincoln recalled that a random person came up to sneeze in her face and went away to laugh with their family.

==== New Jersey ====
On 26 March 2020, Governor Phil Murphy acknowledged reports of bias incidents against Jewish Americans and Korean Americans in Bergen County, which experienced the worst outbreak in New Jersey.

On 4 April 2020, a group of teens in Edison, New Jersey, surrounded a 55-year-old Asian woman and yelled racial slurs about the coronavirus. One of the teenage girls then punched the woman in the back of the head.

In August 2020, Anthony Lodespoto pleaded guilty to threatening to assaults Jews of the Lakewood Township community during the pandemic.

==== New Mexico ====
Racist incidents have occurred in New Mexico.

In March 2020, an international student at the University of New Mexico was targeted with a racist prank outside his dormitory room covered in plastic with the sign "CAUTION – KEEP OUT – QUARANTINE". An Asian American advocacy group was also harassed and was told to "go back where you came from." Vandals spray-painted "Trucha with the coronavirus" at the Asian Noodle Bar restaurant in Albuquerque. It was reported on April that a Vietnamese community member was attacked at Costco in Albuquerque. An Asian American woman said people harass and use racial slurs at her whenever she goes out and claimed another woman even tried to run her over with a car. She said, "I've been told I don't belong here, I've been told I should go back to China and die there and leave Americans alone."

On 29 April 2021, a Florida resident walked into a massage therapy establishment without a mask on in violation of both state and business requirements, yelled racial slurs at the Asian American female employee, refused to wear a mask when ask by staff to put on a mask, assaulted her while calling her the "Chinese virus" and used other racial slurs, and continued until police arrived. Police charged the attacker with misdemeanor counts of aggravated battery and leaving painful temporary disfigurement while investigating felony crime and hate crime charges.

==== New York ====
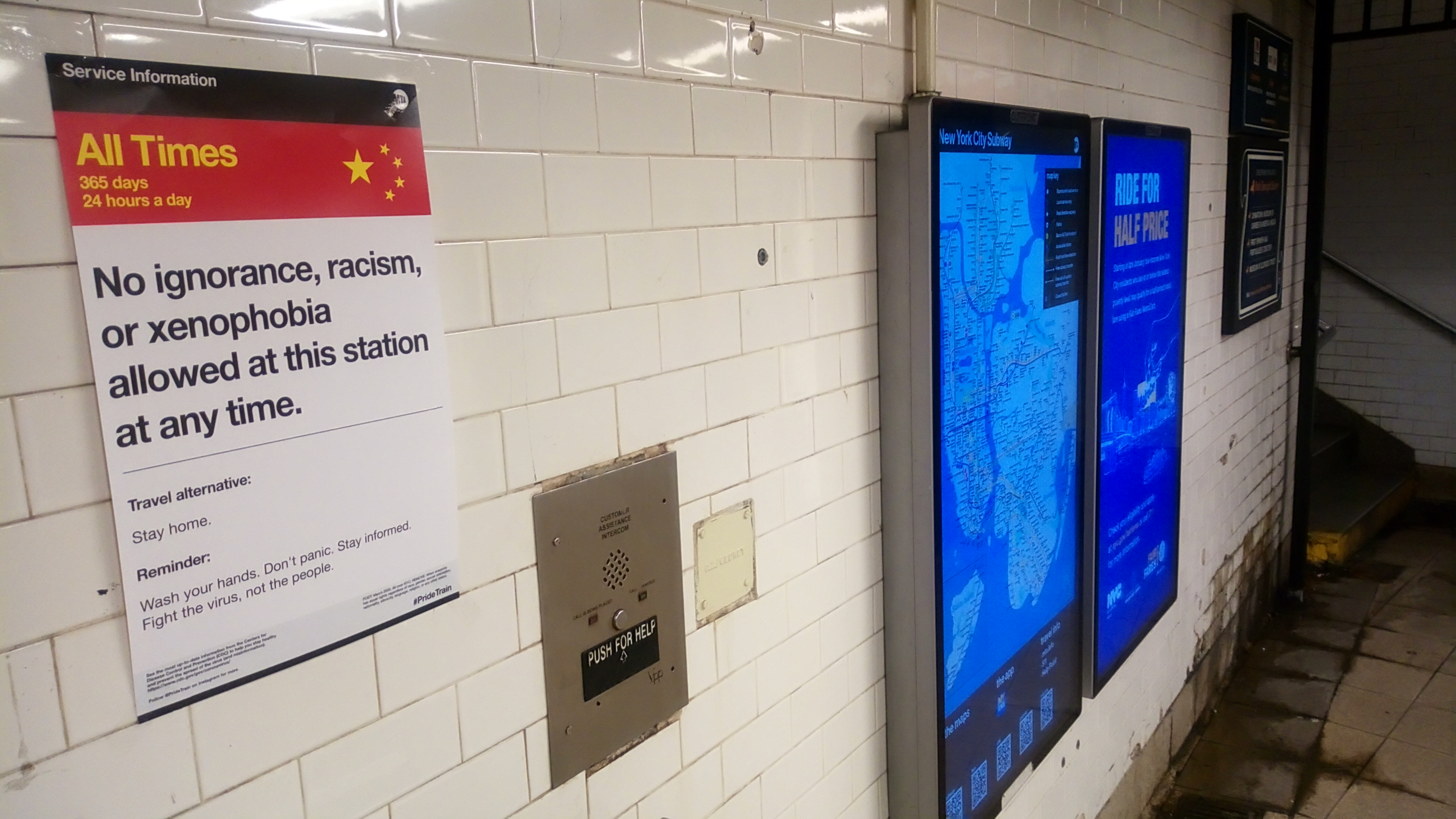
An unofficial anti-xenophobia poster at a New York City Subway station amid the coronavirus pandemic

Overall during 2020, the NYPD arrested 20 suspects for committing anti-Asian hate crimes. Of the perpetrators, 55% were non-Hispanic Black, 35% were Hispanic and 10% were non-Hispanic White. 60% of the accused were male and 40% were female. The overall number of anti-Asian hate crimes registered with police had risen from three in 2019 to 28 in 2020. There were 129 reported hate crimes against Asian-Americans in 2021 as of 5 December, up 361% from 28 in 2020, and more than a fortyfold increase since 2019.

In March 2020, as New York became a global hotspot, prejudicial sentiment against New Yorkers began to be reported as several states put into place regulations banning, blocking or imposing quarantines on them. New York state governor Andrew Cuomo proclaimed "We will not let New Yorkers be discriminated against" as he reprimanded Rhode Island for initiating xenophobic procedures targeting New Yorkers.

In February 2022 a South Korean diplomat was physically attacked, prompting city councilman Keith Powers to issue a statement on the increase in hate crimes against the AAPI over the past year.

==== North Carolina ====
A poster for a Chinese American real estate agent was vandalized with racial slurs near Pineville, North Carolina. The real estate agent believes she was targeted because of the coronavirus.

==== Ohio ====
It was reported in February that there was suspicion and mistreatment of Asian Americans and specifically Chinese Americans in Northeast Ohio. There has been a decrease of customers of Chinese owned and/or operated businesses. In April 2020, a Thai American woman was yelled at with racist insults from a driver in a red pickup truck as they both drove through Lakewood, Ohio. The driver also said, "You're a virus and get out of America. And that's an order." Another woman reported that two young men on bikes spit on her and told her to go home and chanted "Corona, corona" in downtown Columbus.

==== Oklahoma ====
On 20 June 2020, in a speech in Tulsa, Oklahoma, former President of the United States Donald Trump used language widely considered racist when he referred to COVID-19 as "Kung Flu", a phrase Senior Counselor to the President Kellyanne Conway had previously described as "wrong", "highly offensive" and "very hurtful". On 22 June 2020, the White House defended Trump's use of the term.

==== Oregon ====
In Portland, a man was arrested after allegedly kicking an Asian woman who was with her son on a bus on 22 January 2021. Prosecutors say the man yelled racial slurs related to the coronavirus during the attack. The case against the suspect was later dismissed because of a lack of public defenders.

A bar in Medford drew backlash after the electronic billboard displayed the words "CHINA VIRUS HOURS". In response, the bar was review bombed on Yelp, leading the site to disable reviews for it.

Vandalism targeting a Portland district of Asian-owned businesses has been suggested as being related to racism related to COVID-19.

A college student in Salem was assaulted by two men while walking to a store. Police are investigating the incident as a possible hate crime.

==== Pennsylvania ====
In a Philadelphia SEPTA subway station in March 2020, an Asian couple was surrounded by a group and attacked. Harassment and attacks on Asians have included a reporter for The Philadelphia Inquirer who was verbally harassed several times during the same month.

In August 2020, a woman shouted expletives at a nine-month-pregnant woman and her daughter, sprayed water on her, then punched her in the face in Philadelphia at 13th Street and Walnut Street.

On 3 September 2020, Philadelphia's Chinese business community organized two meetings of a panel of Asian-American community leaders and organizers to emphasize how enforcing hate crime laws and constitutional rights education reduces hate crimes against Asian Americans.

The Lower Moreland High School received criticism from students and parents after racist texts surfaced among several of its students. Among the messages was one calling for Asians to be stoned and lynched.

In February 2021, a restaurant in Philadelphia received complaints after naming a macaroni and cheese dish "COVID Mac". The dish in question was made with Chinese chili.

On 4 April 2021, at 2:00 pm a homeless man approached two women and struck one, age 27, unprovoked in Philadelphia at 11th Street and Filbert Street.

On 6 April 2021, at 7:40 pm a man shouted, "You gave me coronavirus" at an Asian American man, 64, repeatedly bumped him then assaulted him in Philadelphia on North 10th Street. The Philadelphia District Attorney charged the man with ethnic intimidation, terroristic threats, assault, and other related charges.

On 15 April 2021, Philadelphia City Council passed a resolution to have the School District of Philadelphia teach Asian American history during Asian Pacific American Heritage Month (May) to help combat anti-Asian hate.

==== South Carolina ====
While a Taiwanese American CNN reporter, Natasha Chen, was working on a Memorial Day weekend story in Myrtle Beach, South Carolina, a man racially harassed the reporter about her mask, told her to "get out of his country" with an expletive and that she was responsible for the pandemic.

==== Texas ====
At a Sam's Club in Midland, Jose Gomez III, 19, stabbed two adults and two children, including a Sam's Club employee who attempted to stop the attack. The targeted victims were identified as an Asian family, specifically a Burmese father with a two-year-old and six-year-old. The FBI lists the case as a hate crime as the suspected indicated he stabbed the Asian family because he thought they were Chinese spreading the coronavirus. Gomez was sentenced to 25 years in federal prison for the attack.

An Austin Police Department officer was suspended for text messages, which according to a disciplinary memo, suggested that the recipients, who were former APD officers, would get COVID-19 from a homeless Asian man. One recipient responded with several racial slurs against Asians.

On April Fools' Day 2020, two students from Angelo State University, Michael Luna and Shane Stumpf, placed several coronavirus warning posters on an international Korean student's dormitory door as a racist prank. When confronted, they fought and then Stumpf pulled out his gun on the Korean student. According to a reporter for the Korean newspaper Joins.com, Stumpf runs a country music YouTube channel where he plays in front of a background with the Confederate battle flag.

Chinatown in Houston faced a drop in customers after people falsely and maliciously spread rumors online of an outbreak of the coronavirus.

On 14 March 2021, a ramen restaurant in San Antonio was covered in racist graffiti after its owner spoke out against Governor Abbot's lifting of the state mask mandate.

==== Utah ====
In March 2021, several Asian Americans in Salt Lake County received threatening messages. One restaurant was sent a letter blaming Asians for the pandemic.

==== Washington ====
In Seattle and elsewhere in Washington State, a rise in anti-Asian racism has been blamed on coronavirus.

On 26 March 2020, windows were shattered at Jade Garden restaurant in Seattle's Chinatown–International District. Total damages were estimated to be around $1,500. The business was already down 80% at beginning of March, which forced the owner to temporarily lay off 33 employees. With this addition of damages, the owner said they did not have enough money for the repairs. The owner said that the damages "weren't just a simple rock being thrown, but a deliberate attack where 'someone took the time in the middle of the night to smash the windows in hard, very forcefully, five times.'" In late March in Yakima, Minado Buffet had broken windows and the building was spray-painted with hate speech saying, "Take the corona back you chink." Damages would cost $1,000 according to restaurant's owner.

On 16 May, a man attacked and spat on an Asian couple in downtown Seattle, blaming them for the coronavirus pandemic.

In February 2021 in Renton, a woman was recorded calling an Asian man a chink and throwing a snowball at him.

On 3 April 2021, a 15-year-old was arrested in Tacoma after a video surfaced of the juvenile attacking an Asian couple. The attack took place on 19 November 2020.

On 26 April 2021, a Caucasian man, 25, encountered two Asian American men in Bothell (the attacker and the other men were previously unknown to each other), and unprovokedly gave the middle finger to them as they exited their apartment, lunged with a hunting knife, stabbed the victim, also 25, in the heart, and lunged for the other victim who escaped. He was arrested that hour, while the first victim later died.

==== Wisconsin ====
On 24 March 2020, a student from the University of Wisconsin saw chalk graffiti across the street from the campus saying, "It's from China #chinesevirus". The university later released a statement acknowledging that racism had increased towards students of East Asian and South Asian descent.

On 12 May 2020, a 57-year-old white man was arrested at a grocery store in Stevens Point for harassing, with racial slurs, Hmong shoppers wearing masks.

== Oceania ==
=== Australia ===
On 26 January 2020, two Murdoch News Corp tabloids ran controversial headlines, the Melbourne Herald Sun's headline read, "Chinese virus pandamonium", a misspelling of "pandemonium" and alluding to China's native pandas, while Sydney's The Daily Telegraph headline read "China kids stay home". One of the outcomes of these headlines was a petition of over 51,000 signatures in 24 hours demanding an apology and stating that these tabloids were not representative of Australians. In response, the Sydney Morning Herald ran a counter-piece titled "This virus is not 'Chinese' – don't racialise it because we all have to be prepared".

Several isolated incidents of xenophobia and racism related to the COVID-19 pandemic were also reported in the media. On 28 January 2020, a man collapsed and died of a suspected cardiac arrest outside of a restaurant in Sydney's Chinatown. Unconfirmed viral videos circulating on social media suggest that bystanders refused to perform CPR out of fear of the coronavirus. In February, it was reported that a supermarket employee had refused entry to customers of Asian appearance, claiming it was to prevent the spread of the coronavirus. A witness made a complaint that was upheld by Woolworths, which confirmed that the employee had been in the wrong, apologised, and said that it was conducting a full investigation into the incident. Ravenswood School for Girls, a private school on Sydney's North Shore reportedly asked a South Korean student to leave her dormitory – even though she had not been to China since visiting Shanghai in October 2019. Similarly, a Chinese-Malaysian student in Perth found herself evicted from her shared home upon returning to Australia after visiting her home country for Lunar New Year.

One news agency reported in February 2020 that Chinese restaurants and establishments in Sydney and Melbourne had seen a dramatic drop in business, with trade declining by more than seventy percent. According to an online Ipsos MORI poll conducted in February 2020, 23% of Australian respondents would consider in the future avoiding people of Chinese origin to protect themselves from coronavirus.

During the early months of the pandemic there was an increased number of isolated reports where members of the Chinese-Australian and Asian-Australian communities were subjected to verbal vitriol and racist slurs. On 20 March 2020, a student wearing a mask in Hobart, Tasmania was told, "you've got the virus" and "go back to your country" before being punched, leaving him with a bruised eye and broken glasses. The motivation for the attack was partly attributed to the cultural differences between Eastern and Western cultures in wearing masks. However, the attacker was already known to police and was jailed after pleading guilty to common assault.

In October 2020, a Chinese restaurant in Victoria reportedly received a letter telling the owners to "go back to Wuhan" and calling Chinese people "bloody bird and animal shit eating". 84.5% of Asian-Australians experienced at least one instance of discrimination between January and October 2020, according to a survey.

In March 2021, it was reported that a pregnant Asian-Australian couple, while waiting for a pregnancy scan in south Perth, was at the receiving end of racial slurs and abuse. A woman allegedly told the couple to "piss off back to China" as well as other slurs. The Asian-Australian man responded by saying, "Don't tell me to get out of my own country ... You just told me to get out of my own country, go back to where I come from ... I was born here, mate." The incident was recorded on camera and posted online. The couple said they were "heartened" by the supportive responses they had received after the video was posted and had over 250,000 views.

The COVID-19 Racism Incident Report Survey 2021, conducted by the Asian Australian Alliance revealed that 52% of those who had faced COVID-19-related racism were of Chinese descent, followed by Vietnamese (8%), Malaysian (8%), Korean (7%), Singaporean (3%), Filipino (3%) and Indian (2%) descent. The survey noted that COVID-19-related racism had affected those of East Asian, Southeast Asian and South Asian descent and other migrant backgrounds, with blame being pushed on different communities as times goes on.

=== Fiji ===
On 5 February 2020, Fiji's state-owned broadcaster Fijian Broadcasting Corporation (FBC) reported that a local Chinese resident had been berated publicly at a bus station by a man claiming that the victim had COVID-19.

An opposition Fijian member of parliament Mitieli Bulanauca mentioned that COVID-19 has been spread by evil forces to assist China and they were responsible for the crisis, which is being assisted by satanic forces. Bulanauca also claimed that the World Health Organization (WHO) had sided with China over the poor handling of the COVID-19 outbreak. The Chinese Embassy in Fiji condemned claims made by Bulanauca saying that it is shocked and disappointed as his remarks are not factual and were taken from fake social media pages.

=== New Zealand ===
MP Raymond Huo said there were racial abuse incidents in the country's Chinese community. An online petition to prevent people from China from entering the country was signed by more than 18,000 people. In Canterbury, an email was sent to a Chinese-origin student's parent, which reportedly said, "our Kiwi kids don't want to be in the same class with your disgusting virus spreaders."

Mayor of Auckland Phil Goff said he was "sickened" by the reports of Asian-origin people being racially targeted at swimming pools, public transport and restaurants.

There were reports of incidents of violent assaults against New Zealanders of Korean descent. In February 2021, the Chinese consulate in Auckland was affected by a phony bomb threat made on an events website Aucklife that was hacked. The motive was reportedly a punitive response against China for allegedly causing the pandemic.

Indigenous Māori reported high levels of discrimination throughout the pandemic, potentially due to "iwi checkpoints" in which tribal authorities set up COVID-19 safety checkpoints to discourage non-essential travelers from visiting predominantly Māori lands.

Following a Delta variant community outbreak in mid–August 2021, several congregants of the predominantly Samoan "Samoan Assemblies of God Mangere" church received racist abuse after their church was linked to 58 cases in the outbreak. Auckland councillor Efeso Collins claimed there was a racist double standard towards the Pasifika community. The Ministry of Health condemned racism against the Pasifika community.

== South America ==
=== Argentina ===
On 26 February 2020, an incident involving a fight was reported in La Plata between a Chinese supermarket owner and an Argentine delivery man. The fight was triggered because the delivery man said "¿Qué hacés, coronavirus?" ("What's up, coronavirus?"), making a joke about Chinese people and the coronavirus. Both men ended up injured and the police later had to intervene.

=== Bolivia ===
Local authorities quarantined three Japanese nationals despite them having no coronavirus-related symptoms.

=== Brazil ===
Brazil's Education Minister, Abraham Weintraub, tweeted an anti-Chinese slur on 4 April 2020. He insinuated that China was responsible for the COVID-19 pandemic and that it was part of its "plan for world domination". In the original Portuguese, his tweet substituted the letter "r" with capital "L" – "BLazil" instead of "Brazil", for example – in a style commonly used to mock a Chinese accent.

On 16 April 2020, a judge ruled in favor of tribes in the Javari Valley and barred the evangelical Christian group New Tribes Mission of Brazil from entering the area. The group UNIVAJA, which unites some of these tribes, released a statement identifying themselves as "survivors of previous genocidal plagues" and accusing the missionaries of "physically expos[ing] us to a lethal virus". Two months earlier, President Bolsonaro had selected a former missionary from New Tribes to head the government agency responsible for protecting these tribes.

According to Brazilian journalist Gabriel Leão, Asian Brazilians have not been impacted as much by racism and discrimination as other Asian communities in the Northern Hemisphere, particularly those in the United States, United Kingdom, and other European countries. However, Leão expressed concern that anti-Asian sentiment will increase in Brazil as well, because of how Brazil's president Jair Bolsonaro tried to use the pandemic as an opportunity to attack China, similar to Donald Trump. In early 2020, Bolsonaro reportedly became convinced that COVID-19 was "part of a Chinese government scheme to expand its global power".

According to Leão, there have already been reports of Brazilians of Asian descent suffering from pandemic-related harassment, for example, being told to "go back to their country" or being accused of "spreading the virus". He himself has heard strangers in Brazil casually curse the "Chinese virus". Chinese Brazilians in particular have been dealing with increased occurrences of discrimination in 2020, for example being told to "go back to China", "watch out for sellers", or to "get out, Chinese". One Chinese Brazilian in particular was told "Put the fucking mask on, you piece of shit. These pests come to our country to kill us. Go back to your country, you animal" when he tried to take off his mask to drink water at a clinic in Rio de Janeiro at the end of 2020.

== Responses ==
Canadian Prime Minister Justin Trudeau condemned racism against Chinese Canadians while attending a Lunar New Year festival in Toronto on 29 January 2020. Likewise, John Tory, the Mayor of Toronto, denounced xenophobia toward Chinese Canadians, amid reports of increasing stigma facing that community.

On 30 January 2020, the World Health Organization's Emergency Committee issued a statement advising all countries to be mindful of the "principles of Article 3 of the IHR (the International Health Regulations)", which the WHO says is a caution against "actions that promote stigma or discrimination", when conducting national response measures to the outbreak.

In response to the heightened outbreak of the virus in Italy, which caused the Chinese community to shut down businesses due to racist attacks, President Sergio Mattarella made a surprise visit on 6 February 2020 to a primary school in Rome where nearly half the pupils are Chinese, saying "Friendship and peace are fundamental and you know it."

An online petition titled "We zijn geen virussen!" ("We are not viruses!" in English) was started in the Netherlands on 8 February 2020 in protest of racism against Dutch Chinese and others of Asian descent, which garnered over 13,600 signatures on its first day and had been signed more than 57,600 times by the end of the month.

On 27 February 2020, the High Commissioner for Human Rights Michelle Bachelet called for solidarity with people of ethnic Asian origin subject to such discrimination.

On 14 March 2020, more than two hundred civil rights groups in the United States demanded that the House of Representatives and Senate leadership publicly denounce the growing amount of anti-Asian racism related to the pandemic and take "tangible steps to counter the hysteria" around the coronavirus, offering the passage of a joint resolution denouncing the racism and xenophobia as one solution.

Stop AAPI Hate, a joint project of Asian Pacific Policy and Planning Council, Chinese for Affirmative Action, San Francisco State University's Asian American Studies Department, launched a website on 20 March 2020, encouraging the reporting of coronavirus-related harassment, discrimination, and bigotry.

In the United States, The Anti-Defamation League, the FBI and former 2020 U.S. Democratic presidential candidate Andrew Yang have also pointed out that the virus has led to increased incidents of antisemitism.

New York Attorney General Letitia James launched a hotline for New Yorkers to report hate crimes and discrimination amid the coronavirus outbreak.

In response to the scandal surrounding anti-African discrimination, provincial authorities in the Chinese province of Guangdong set up a hotline for foreign nationals and laid out measures discouraging businesses and rental houses in Guangzhou from refusing people based on race or nationality.

In response to the rising discrimination against Asian Americans, the Black Lives Matter movement condemned the racism against Asian-Americans via Twitter.

In 2020, Red Hong Yi (also referred to as 'Red'), a Malaysian artist, created and released a series of 10 artworks via her Instagram page titled "#IAMNOTAVIRUS" that depicted portraits of numerous Asian personalities out of foodstuff such as matcha leaves that she found in her house during lockdown. Acting as a response to anti-Asian hate crimes that heightened during the Coronavirus pandemic, she described the importance of "standing up for everyone no matter their skin colour."

In June 2021, the City Council of Aurora, Colorado, agreed to utilize city funds to supply Asian residents with safety kits and provide AAPI (Asian American Pacific Islander) training for Aurora police officers. This comes amidst a recent city council decision to reject a Statue of Peace proposal in Aurora. In response to the statue proposal being defeated, city staff wrote in a letter that "The memorials have attracted a wide-range of community response including peaceful and antagonistic free speech events, vandalism, Asian hate, and legal action requesting removal," and that "based on this information the Parks, Recreation, and Open Space Department believes the memorial placement on city-owned property is not a compatible use."

On 8 September 2021, research published by Mandiant and Google found that a network of thousands of fake social media accounts across dozens of social media platforms, including Facebook, Twitter and YouTube, were linked to the Chinese government and were attempting to draw protests in the United States against anti-Asian-American sentiment and against allegations that China engineered SARS-CoV-2, the virus that causes COVID-19.

== See also ==
- Anti-Chinese sentiment
- Anti-Filipino sentiment
- Anti-Japanese sentiment
- Anti-Indian sentiment
- Anti-Italianism
- Anti-Korean sentiment
- Anti-Russian sentiment
- Anti-Thai sentiment
- Anti-Vietnamese sentiment
- Antiziganism
- Islamophobia
- Antisemitism
- Homophobia
- Transphobia
- Cyber racism
- Yellow Peril
- 1817–1824 cholera pandemic, a pandemic that also resulted in anti-Asian sentiment, especially towards Indian people and culture, and resulted in cholera's association with Asia
