= Headache Stencil =

Thai graffiti artist and activist

Headache Stencil is a pseudonymous Thai street artist. Dubbed Thailand's version of the British graffiti artist Banksy, Headache Stencil is known for his satirical graffiti art depicting the military officials of Thailand who took power in 2014. He says of himself, "I started calling myself Headache Stencil because I knew what I did is going to cause people headaches. I've been a troublemaker since I was a kid".

== Career ==
Headache's works first appeared on the streets of Bangkok and Chiang Mai in 2014.

He became more widely known in January 2018 with his graffiti of the Thai Deputy Prime Minister Prawit Wongsuwan's face inside an alarm clock. In April 2019 he had his first social critique exhibition “Sex Drugs and Headache Stencil” at the Patpong Museum's Candle Light Studio in Bangkok's infamous redlight district. The show focused on sex workers living reality.

To commemorate the 88th anniversary of the 1932 Siamese Revolution, on 24 June 2020, Headache Stencil and some fellow activists projected images of 1932 revolt leader Pridi Banomyong onto a wall of Wat Ratchanadda, a Buddhist temple. Also shown was the proclamation that announced the end of absolute monarchy. Thai authorities now regard the commemoration of the democratic revolt to be a crime.

== Controversy ==
On 26 January 2020, Headache Stencil came under controversy for his statements on Twitter targeting Chinese people, which read "Hey Chink! Please go back to ur shit-eating country. Our government need ur money to keep their power but you all not welcome for us now. #notwelcometothailand #backtourchinklandpls". This incident was covered by both domestic and foreign press as an example of COVID-19 related sinophobia and anti-Chinese racism.
