= 365 by Whole Foods Market =

Defunct American organic supermarket chain

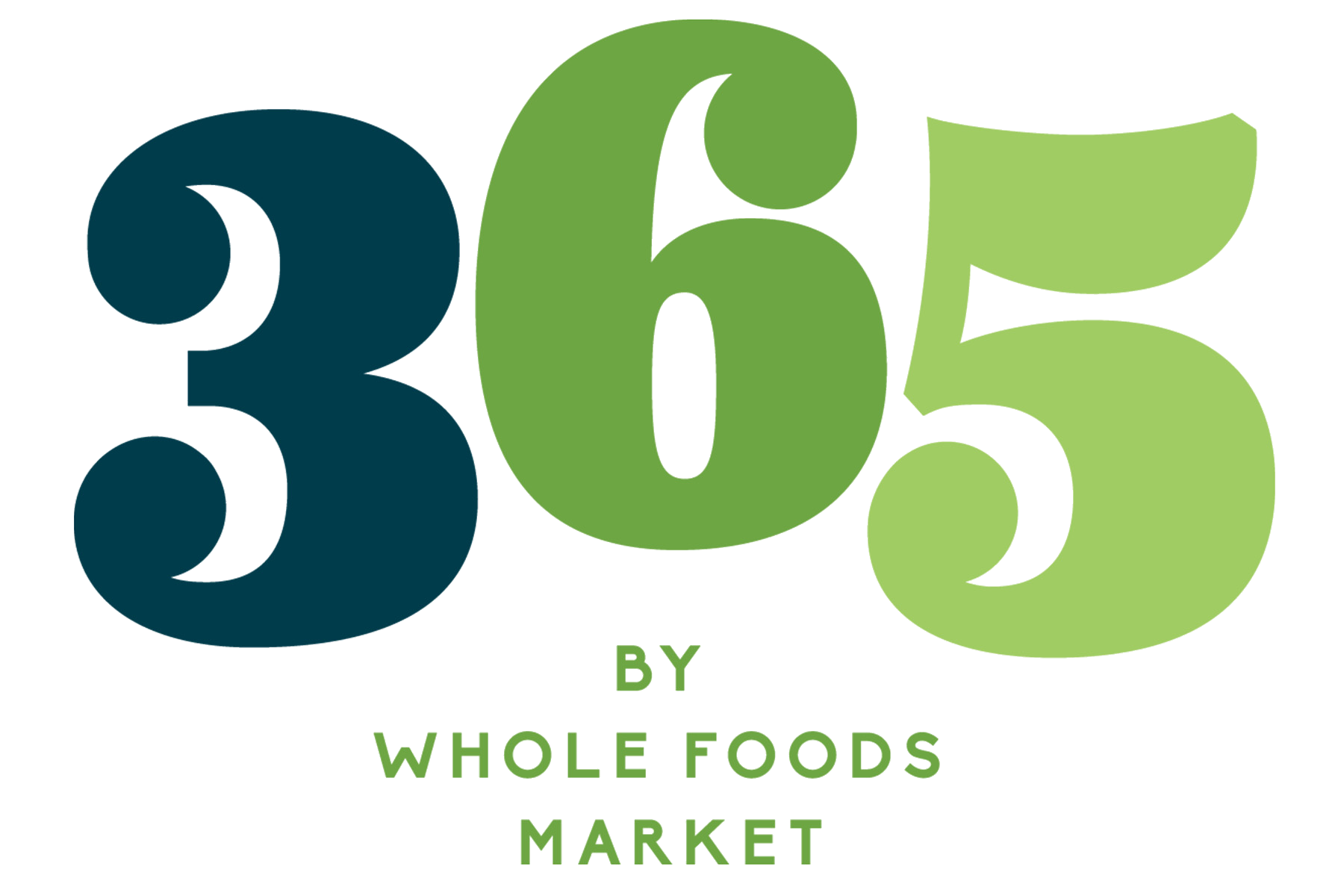
- Type: Subsidiary
- Industry: Retail groceries
- Founded: June 2015; 11 years ago
- Defunct: c. December 2019; 6 years ago
- Fate: Converted to Whole Foods or closed
- Headquarters: Austin, Texas, U.S.
- Number of locations: 12 (December 2018)
- Parent: Whole Foods Market
- Website: Last archive of website

365 By Whole Foods Market was an organic supermarket chain that was formed by Whole Foods Market in 2016 and closed in 2019 when its parent company was acquired by Amazon. The chain was formed at a time when prices at Whole Foods were considerably higher than the prices for the same organic foods offered by conventional supermarkets, such as Kroger and Albertsons.

== History ==
In June 2015, the organic supermarket chain Whole Foods Market announced a more affordable store concept aimed at younger consumers, called "365 By Whole Foods Market". The stores used digital price tags and communicated with customers in store via a smartphone app. To target a goal of zero waste, the locations donated leftover food, utilized LED lighting, and installed carbon dioxide-powered refrigeration cases. Jeff Turnas served as president of the division.

To cut costs, customers unloaded bulkier products directly off a pallet. Some items, like produce, were priced per item instead of by weight. For items sold by weight, the customers weighed, barcoded, and tagged those items before they reached the check-out counter. Unlike the regular Whole Foods stores, the 365 stores offered a rewards program.

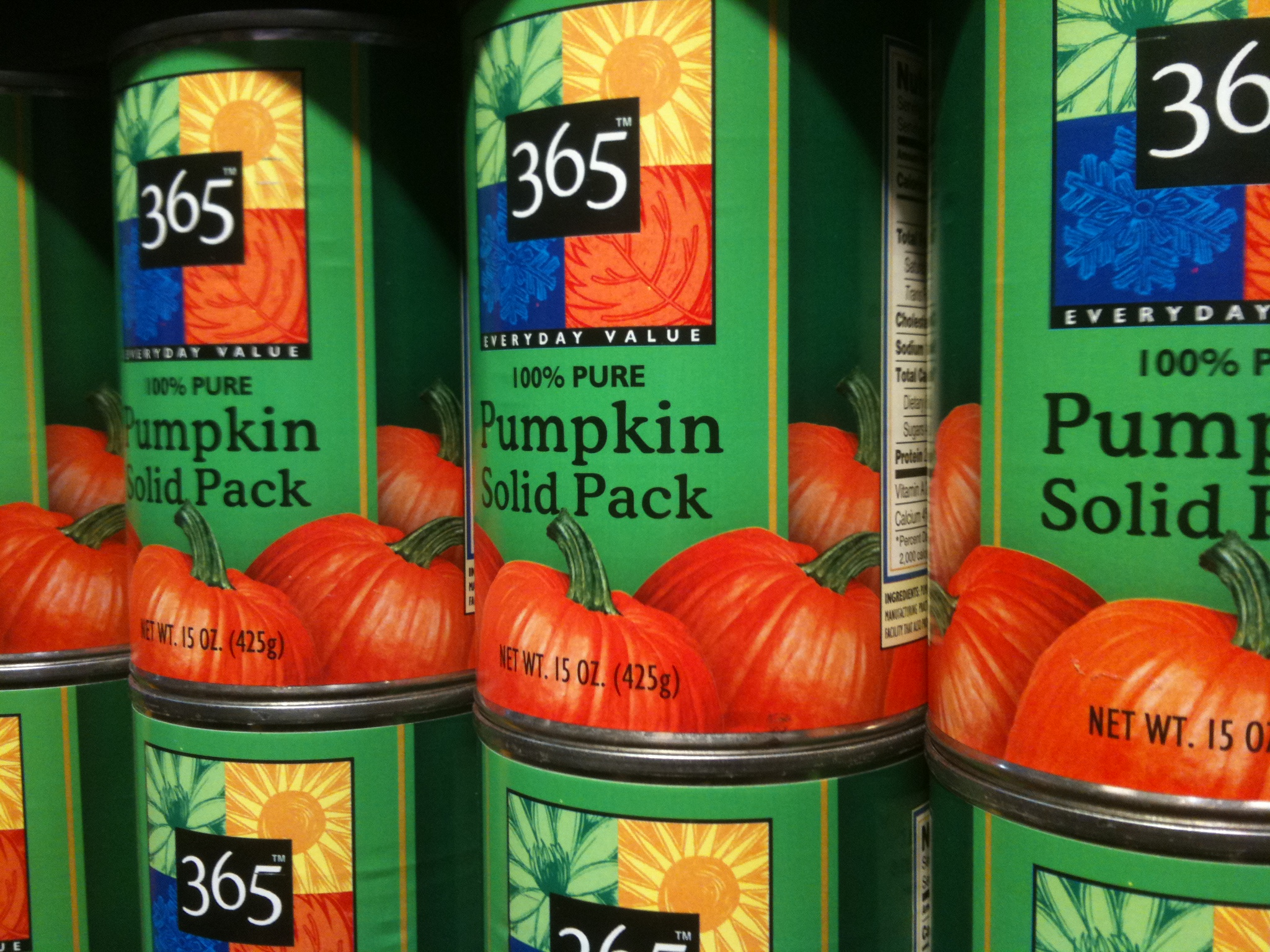
365 by Whole Foods Market private label brand

The first 365 By Whole Foods Market store opened in May 2016 in the Silver Lake neighborhood of Los Angeles. A second location opened two months later in Lake Oswego, Oregon, followed by a third store two months after that in Bellevue, Washington. In April 2017, a fourth location opened in Cedar Park, Texas. In August 2017, a fifth location opened in Santa Monica, California. In September 2017, a sixth location opened in Akron, Ohio.

The Bellevue store, the only location within a mall, was closed without warning in October 2017 after 13 months of operation. The mall filed a lawsuit against Whole Foods to keep the store open, but the Washington state appeals court ruled that Whole Foods could keep the store closed as long as they paid the rent to fulfill the lease agreement.

In December 2017, a seventh location opened in Concord, California. In January 2018, an eighth location opened in the Fort Greene neighborhood of Brooklyn, New York. The ninth location for the chain opened in April 2018 in Long Beach, California, followed by the opening of the tenth location a month later in Upland, California. An eleventh store opened in the Independence Heights district of Houston, Texas, in August 2018. In December 2018, the twelfth and thirteenth stores were opened at almost the same time in the Buckhead district of Atlanta and in Decatur, Georgia.

There were plans to open five additional stores in Illinois, Indiana, Ohio, Georgia, and Florida.

Although there were as many as twenty-two 365 stores under various stages of construction by early July 2017, progress at most of these construction sites came to a halt upon the news of the possible acquisition of the parent company by Amazon, and there was no information at the time if and when the construction at any of the building sites would resume. As a result of the firm's merger with Amazon, Whole Foods canceled the continuation of work at the construction sites for at least two 365 stores. In January 2018, the Fresh Thyme Farmers Market chain announced that they were taking over the abandoned 365 store construction site at College Mall in Bloomington, Indiana, to open a second Bloomington-area store. In the same month, the City of Los Alamitos, California, announced the abandonment of a shopping development that a 365 store would have anchored.

In reviewing the new retail format, a reporter for The Motley Fool wrote that the new stores were "closer to a combination of a fruit stand, convenience store, and a restaurant than a traditional grocery store" while a MarketWatch reporter called them "hipster havens" due to their use of high tech as a cost-cutting and efficiency measure. Most reviews were very positive, although some customers said that they missed talking to actual people when placing food orders via tablets.

In January 2019, it was announced that the 365 by Whole Foods Market concept would be discontinued, but the existing locations would remain open. The following month, it was announced that all existing 365 stores would be converted into regular Whole Foods stores by the end of the year.

== Private label brand ==
Although the short-lived chain is long gone, the 365 by Whole Foods Market moniker is still being used by Whole Foods as a private label brand of low cost foods for both Whole Foods and Amazon.
