= College Mall =

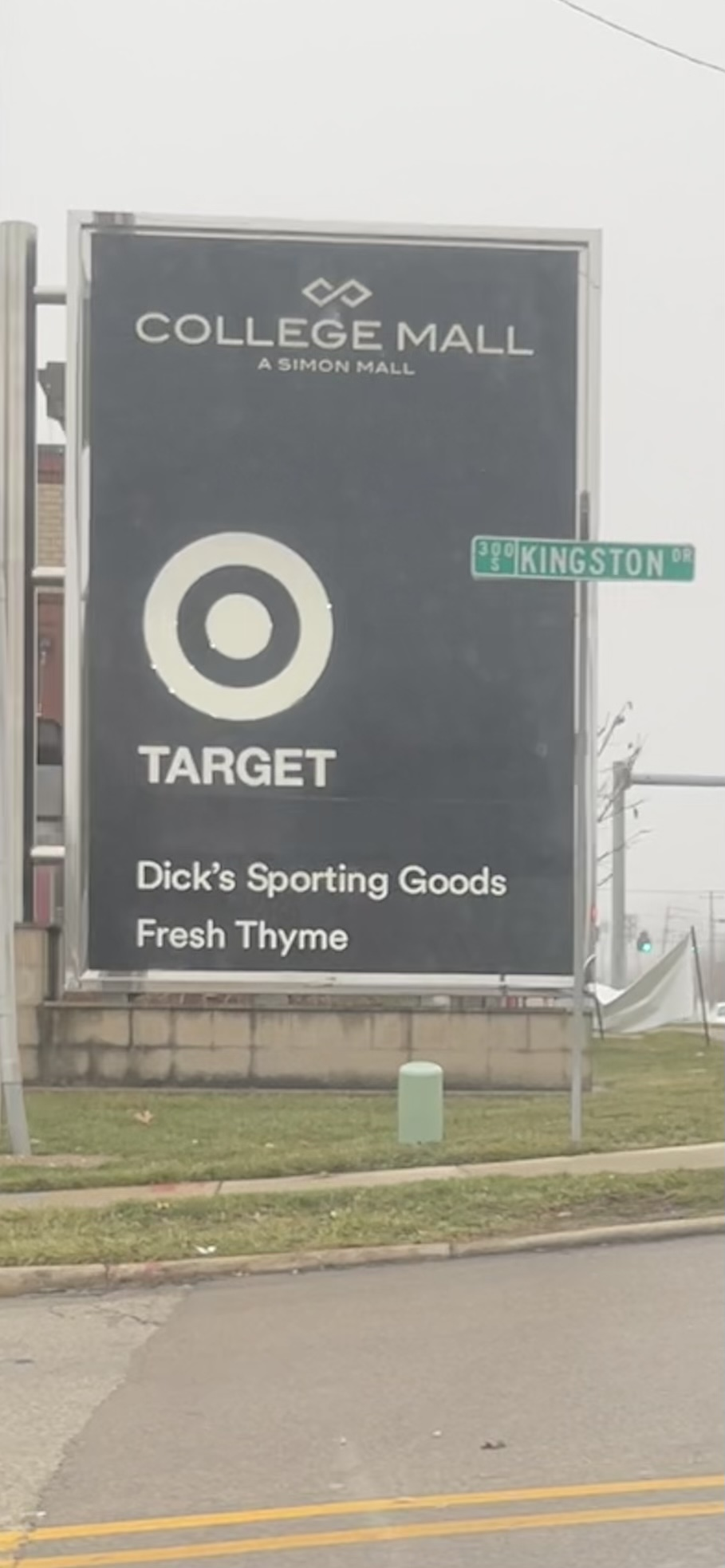
- Location: Bloomington, Indiana, United States
- Coordinates: 39°09′41″N 86°29′45″W
- Opened: March 1965; 61 years ago
- Developer: Melvin Simon & Associates
- Manager: Simon Property Group
- Owner: Simon Property Group
- Num. of stores: 89
- Num. of anchor tenants: 3 (2 open, 1 vacant)
- Floor area: 537,034 square feet (49,892.1 square meters)
- Floors: 1 (2 in former Macy's)
- Public transit: BT 3E, 9, 9L
- Website: www.simon.com/mall/college-mall

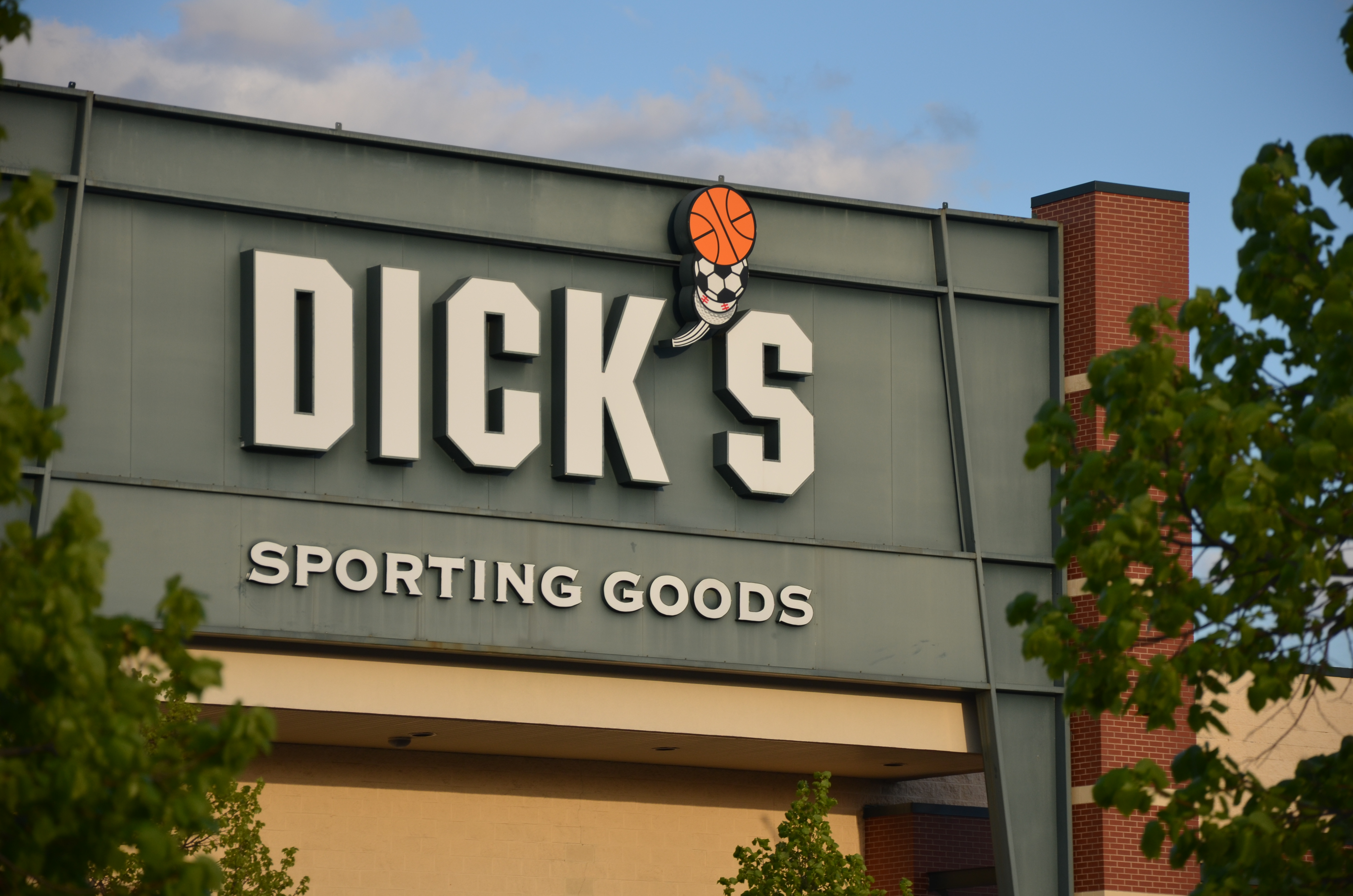
Dick's Sporting Goods

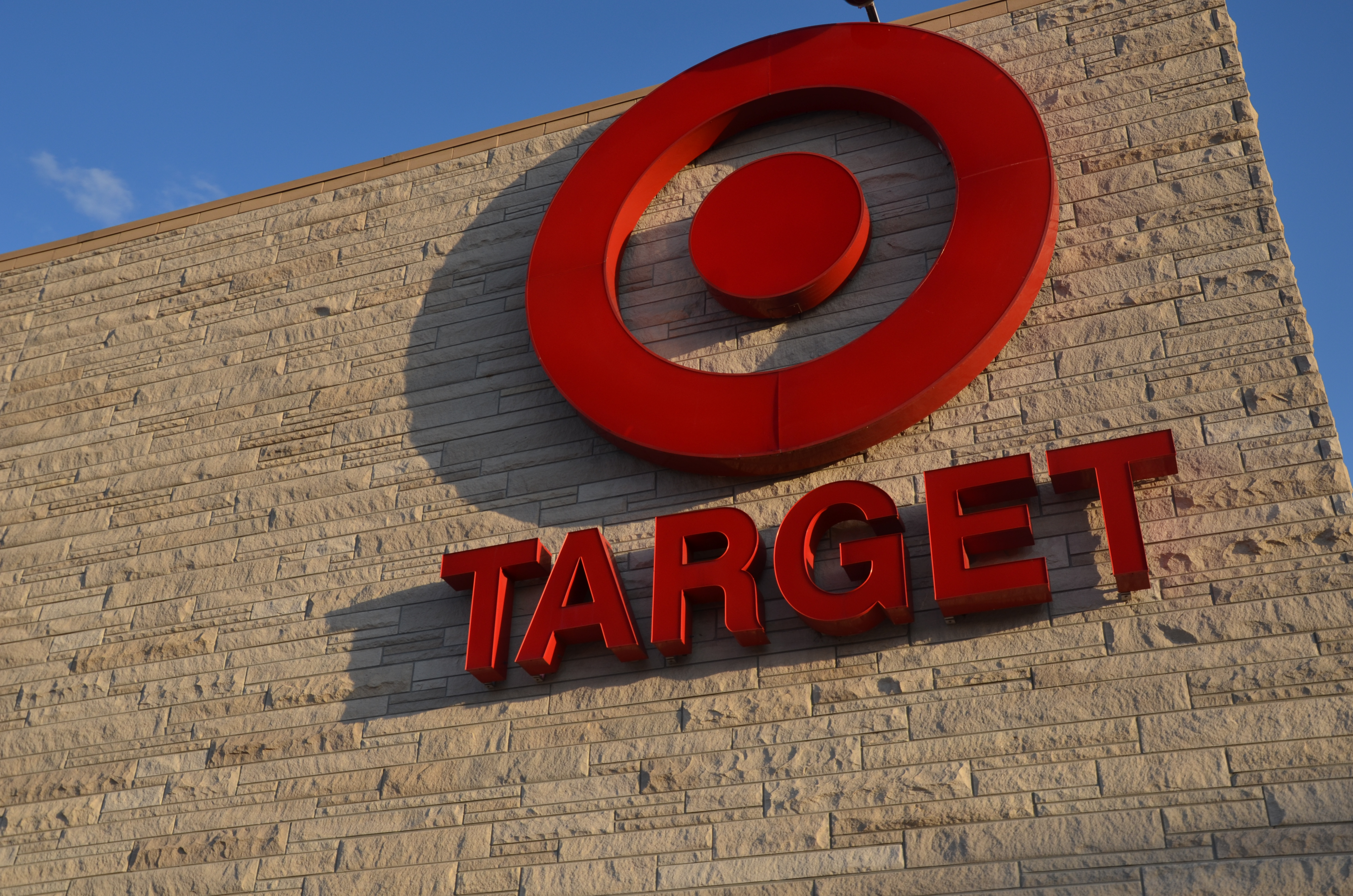
Target at College Mall

College Mall (Bloomington, Indiana)

College Mall is a regional shopping mall located in Bloomington, Indiana. This is home to Indiana University's flagship campus. The mall's anchor stores are Dick's Sporting Goods and Target. The mall also features a Fresh Thyme Farmers Market (with no interior entrance) and an Ulta Beauty.

== History ==
=== 20th century ===
College Mall was one for the first enclosed mall properties developed by Melvin Simon & Associates and was first opened in 1965 with just 250,000 square feet retail space. This makes the mall one of the older malls in the central/southern part of Indiana.

H. P. Wasson and Company and Sears were the original anchors. Sears was the first store to open at the mall in March 1965 with 95,000 square feet and Wasson opened later in August of the same year with 35,000 square feet. A total of 33 shops were opened by the following year.

The first major addition occurred from 1969 to 1970 in which an additional 63,000 square feet of retail space was added. At this time, Wasson was able to nearly double its space to make 59,000 square feet. Notable new tenants included the 2 screens College Mall Cinema (operated by General Cinema), MCL Cafeteria, and L.S. Ayres's Sycamore Shop. Shortly after the completion of this addition, Danner's 5 and 10 Cent Store vacated their 18,000 square feet store which they had occupied since 1965. William H. Block replaced Danner in 1972 with a very limited store while keeping their Block's College Shop open at Indiana and Kirkwood until 1980.

Another major addition and renovation had occurred from 1979 to 1982 in which a new wing was built and the mall expanded east adding JCPenney and L.S. Ayres as new anchors plus over two dozen other stores. Available retail space was increased by 360,000 square feet to make 750,000 square feet. During this time, Sears was able to add 15,000 square feet to make a new total of 125,000 square feet. The new JCPenney store had open in April 1981 with 130,000 square feet while the 2 level new L.S. Ayres store open in August 1982 with 80,000 square feet. At this time, JCPenney relocated from a smaller store that was previously located in downtown Bloomington. For L.S. Ayres, they increased their presence in Bloomington by building their first full department store in the community as replacement to their smaller format Sycamore Shop, a store concept that was used mostly in small communities that may not be able to support a full store, that was previously in the mall.

In September 1980, H. P. Wasson and Company's parent, Goldblatt's, made a surprised announcement that they were going to close their Bloomington store in January 1981. From the time of Wasson's closing in January 1981 to JCPenney's opening in April 1981, Sears store was the only fully functional anchor still operating at the mall.

Block's was able to take advantage of this unexpected situation caused by the unexpected Wasson's vacancy by moving across the hall to occupy the former Wasson's location in August 1981. This move allowed Block's to triple its size and become a full anchor at the mall. When Block's was sold by its parent company to Federated Department Stores in 1987, the Block's location was rebranded Lazarus in November of that year.

=== 21st century ===
The Lazarus store was later closed in April 2003 by its new parent Macy's as a part of a nationwide cost-cutting measure and the site was left vacant for nearly two years before it was razed and a T.G.I. Friday's was built at the location in November 2005 but without a connection to the interior of the mall. T.G.I. Friday's closed in November 2015. In March 2016, the mall management announced that Red Robin was going to replace T.G.I. Friday's by mid-2016.

The property owner Simon DeBartolo Group spent $4.2 million in 1996 for the renovations of the 689,000 square foot mall which included new ceramic floors, new ceilings and new entrances.

Also in April 2001, JCPenney left its 2 level store and closed operations. The store was demolished to make way for a new single level 125,000 square feet Target anchor in March 2004. Target previously had occupied an 86,000 square feet free standing building on an out lot of the mall that was originally built for its Ayr-Way predecessor in 1969.

General Cinema eventually doubled the number of screens to 4 by 1983. After much competition with Kerasotes Theatres, General Cinema later sold the College Mall Cinema to Kerasotes in 1988 to allow Kerasotes to form a monopoly in South Central Indiana. Kerasotes quickly fired all of its union projectionists, citing a corporate policy "of using only manager-projectionists who are responsible for all aspects of managing the theater". In 2000, the 4-screen cinema at the mall was changed from a first run to a discount theater as a result of opening of a large 12 screen complex on the west side of the city. After dwindling ticket sales and the completion of their new multiplex on the west side of Bloomington, Kerasotes closed the College Mall Cinema at the same time neighboring MCL Cafeterias decided to move out of the mall to a location on the westside in 2004. Both the cafeteria and theater had been at the mall since the 1969 era mall addition. Dick's Sporting Goods built a 50,000 square foot store as a new anchor in the area formerly occupied by the cafeteria and theater to replace the old Lazarus in April 2005.

L. S. Ayres became Macy's in September 2006 following Federated Department Stores purchase of L. S. Ayres's parent, The May Department Stores Company, the previous year.

The distribution of food services within the mall was radically changed in 2007 by the construction of a new 12,000 square feet centralized food court that included a large common seating area, new restrooms, and places for staging events. Prior to this time, food services with in the complex were scattered throughout the mall.

In August 2014, Simon Property Group announced that Whole Foods would join the mall in 2016, but declined to give specifics on where in the mall they would occupy. Later in February 2015, Simon Property Group announced that to make room for the new Whole Foods store, they plan to demolish the current Sears store and build a new energy efficient green grocery store from scratch. This announcement surprised the local Sears management since Sears was the first tenant to open its doors at College Mall in 1964 and is the last of the original anchors. Simon also announced that Panera Bread and other business would occupy the yet to be built out lots that is the result of the expected Sears building demolition. After 51 years of operations, Sears finally announced in March 2016 that were closing their store in College Mall with liquidation sales starting March 25 and final closing by June.

In March 2016, the management of College Mall announced that Sears building would be demolished and a new building housing a 365 by Whole Foods Market store, in place of the first-announced full service Whole Foods Market, would be built in its place but without an interior connection to the rest of the mall with an expected opening date sometime in 2017. Although originally scheduled to open on August 1, 2017, construction at the Whole Foods building site ceased in mid-June with concerns that Whole Foods might pull out of the mall if its merger with Amazon goes through. In January 2018, Fresh Thyme Farmers Market announced it will open a new store in place of what was supposed to be 365 by Whole Foods.

On January 5, 2021, it was announced that Macy's would be closing in March 2021 as part of a plan to close 45 stores nationwide, which left Dick's Sporting Goods and Target as the only traditional anchors left.

== See also ==
- List of shopping malls in the United States
- List of Simon Property Group properties
