= Bloomington Transit =

Public transit operator in Bloomington, Indiana, U.S.

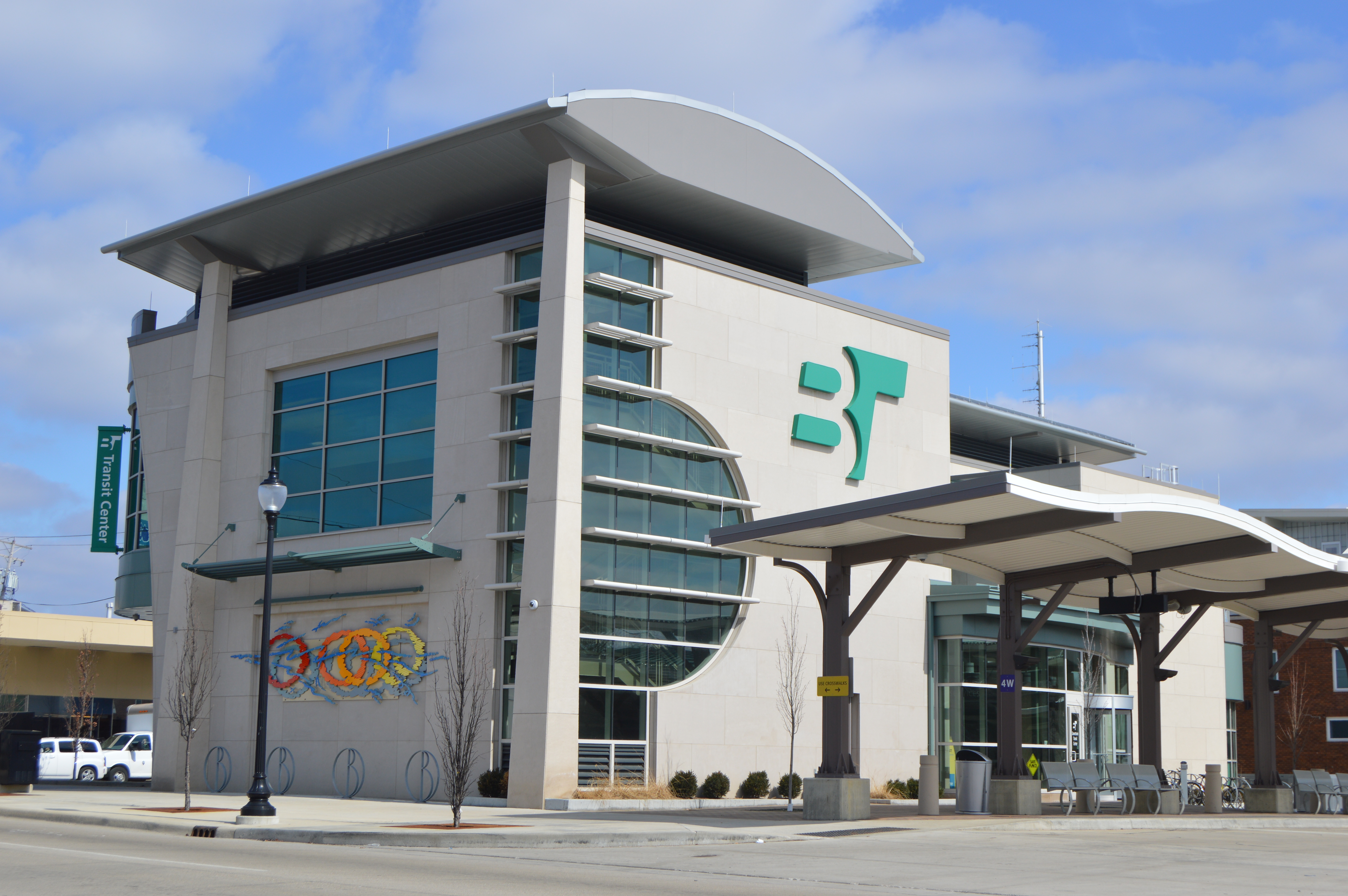
- Bloomington bus terminal
- Headquarters: 130 W. Grimes Lane
- Locale: Bloomington, Indiana
- Service area: Monroe County, Indiana
- Service type: bus service, paratransit
- Routes: 15
- Fuel type: diesel
- Operator: RATP Dev
- Website: Bloomington Transit

Bloomington Transit is the provider of mass transportation in Bloomington, Indiana, United States. 13 routes are operated, with many connected to Indiana University. It is owned by the Bloomington Public Transportation Corporation, a municipal corporation.

== Route list ==
There are 15 regularly scheduled bus routes.

- Route 1 North – Fee Lane / Bloomington High School North
- Route 2 South – South Rogers / Country View Apts
- Route 2 West – 11th Street via Showers Complex
- Route 3 – College Mall / IU Health Hospital
- Route 4 South – High Street / Sherwood Oaks
- Route 4 West – Bloomfield Road / Heatherwood
- Route 5 – Sare Road
- Route 6 – Campus Shuttle
- Route 7 – South Walnut / Clear Creek
- Route 9 – IU Campus / College Mall
- Route 9L - Limited
- Route 11 - West 17th Street / IU Campus Express
- Route 12 - North Walnut / IU Campus Express
- Route 14 - Muller Park / IU Campus Express
- Route 16 - West Side

== Former routes ==
The following routes have been removed from service.

- 1 South - South Walnut/Arbor Glen. Removed August 2022. Replaced by 7.
- 6L - Limited. Removed August 2025.
- 8 - Eastside Local. Removed August 2022.
- 10 - East 10th/IU Health Hospital. Removed August 2022.
- 3 West – Highland Village / Curry Pike. Removed May 31, 2026.
- 13 - Park 48 / Ivy Tech. Removed May 31, 2026

== Bloomington Transit Center ==
The Bloomington Transit Center is located on the south end of downtown Bloomington (corner Walnut St and Third St), and serves as the primary transfer point for Bloomington Transit. The facility opened on August 20, 2014, at a cost of $9.5 million. The transit center includes an indoor waiting area, restrooms, vending machines, and canopies over the bus loading area to protect riders from the weather.

Miller Transportation (aka Hoosier Ride) intercity buses stop at the transit center as well.

== See also ==
- List of bus transit systems in the United States
- Metropolitan Evansville Transit System
