= List of public art in the London Borough of Newham =

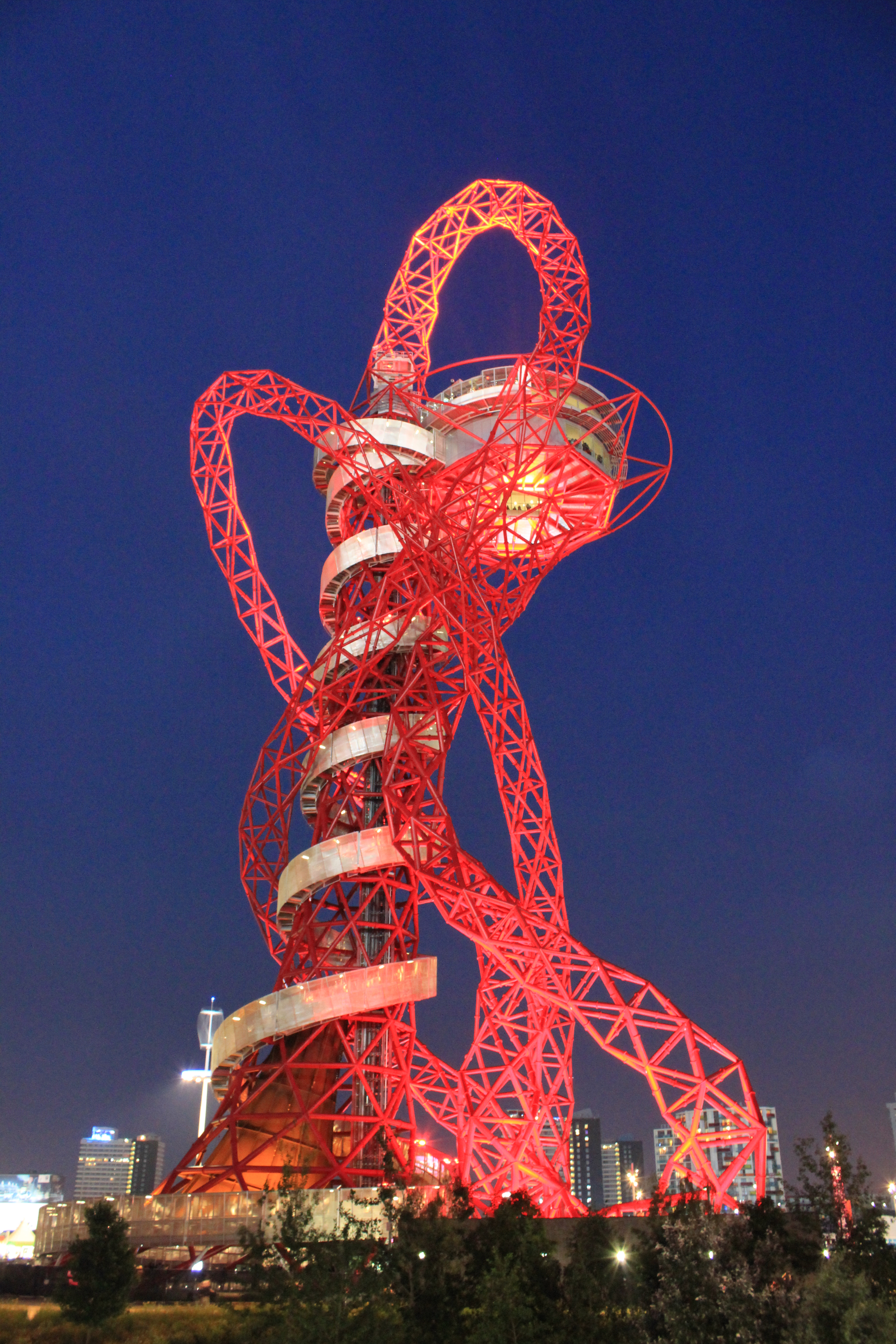
ArcelorMittal Orbit

This is a list of public art in the London Borough of Newham.

== Beckton ==
Image	Title / subject	Location and coordinates	Date	Artist / designer	Type	Designation	Notes
More images	Horses	Beckton Bus Station 51.5116°N 0.0586°E	1990s	Brian Yale	Sculpture	—N/a	

== Bromley-by-Bow ==
Image	Title / subject	Location and coordinates	Date	Artist / designer	Type	Designation	Notes
More images	Statue of Corbet Woodall	Twelvetrees Crescent 51.5233°N 0.0051°W	c. 1926	Arthur George Walker	Statue	Grade II	
	Gas Light and Coke Company War Memorial Lamp	Twelvetrees Crescent 51.52346°N 0.00441°W	?	?	Memorial column with gas lamp	Grade II	
	Gas Light and Coke Company War Memorial Rotunda	Twelvetrees Crescent 51.52351°N 0.00441°W	?	?	War memorial	Grade II	

== Canning Town ==
Image	Title / subject	Location and coordinates	Date	Artist / designer	Type	Designation	Notes
	Memorial to Bradley Stone	Peacock Gym, Caxton Street North 51.50966°N 0.01341°E	1995	Ann Downey	Statue	—N/a	Unveiled 10 January 1995.
	DNA DL90	Bow Creek 51.52037°N 0.00860°W	2003	Abigail Fallis	Sculpture	—N/a	This 9.3 m (31 ft) tall sculpture is a double helix made up of 22 shopping trolleys. It marks the 50th anniversary of the discovery of the structure of DNA, and the artist considers the trolleys a symbol of modern consumer culture.
More images	Gandhi Chaplin Memorial Garden mosaics	Beckton Road 51.51748°N 0.017899°E	2015	Alan Read, pupils of Rokeby School	Mosaic	—N/a	Four mosaics commemorating the meeting nearby of Charlie Chaplin and Mahatma Gandhi in 1931, which inspired the film Modern Times
	Alphabetti Spaghetti	Caxton Works 51.51112°N 0.01206°E	2019	Alex Chinneck	Sculpture	—N/a	Sculpture of a pillar box tied in a knot, one of a number installed around the country.

== Custom House ==
Image	Title / subject	Location and coordinates	Date	Artist / designer	Type	Designation	Notes
	Newham Trackside Wall (second section)	Victoria Dock Road 51.50991°N 0.02480°E	2016–2021	Sonia Boyce	Mural	—N/a	Panels with images, personal testimonies and information relating to the area, on a wall running alongside the Elizabeth line. The two sections combined measure 1.9 kilometres (1.2 mi) in length, making this one of the longest artworks ever commissioned in the UK.
	Prince Regent Station Frieze	Prince Regent DLR station 51.50956°N 0.03462°E	1995	Brian Yale	Frieze	—N/a	Laser-cut metal panels depicting history of the London Docklands area.

== East Ham ==
Image	Title / subject	Location and coordinates	Date	Artist / designer	Type	Designation	Notes
More images	Central Park War Memorial County Borough of East Ham	Central Park 51.5284°N 0.0556°E	1921	Robert Banks-Martin	Cenotaph	Grade II	The architect was the mayor of East Ham during the First World War.

== Forest Gate ==
Image	Title / subject	Location and coordinates	Date	Artist / designer	Type	Designation	Notes
	The Preacher	Forest Gate Methodist Church, Woodgrange Road 51.5480°N 0.0253°E	1961	Peter Laszlo Peri	Architectural sculpture	Grade II	

== Manor Park ==
Image	Title / subject	Location and coordinates	Date	Artist / designer	Type	Designation	Notes
	Bust of Andrew Carnegie	Rabbits Road wall of former Carnegie Library, Manor Park 51.55301°N 0.05372°E	1904	Unknown	Architectural sculpture	Grade II	

== North Woolwich and Silvertown ==
Image	Title / subject	Location and coordinates	Date	Artist / designer	Type	Designation	Notes
More images	Silvertown War Memorial	Royal Wharf, North Woolwich Road 51.4999°N 0.0278°E	c. 1920	Thomas Arthur Darcy Braddell	Pillar	Grade II	Moved to this location in 2016.
	St Mark's Church War Memorial	Brick Lane Music Hall 51.5026°N 0.0426°E	c. 1920	?	Celtic cross	Grade II	Moved to this location in 1991.
	Brick Lane Music Hall mural	Brick Lane Music Hall 51.5027°N 0.0425°E	2004		Mural	—N/a	
	Newham Trackside Wall (first section)	Connaught Road and Albert Road 51.50156°N 0.05089°E	2016–2021	Sonia Boyce	Mural	—N/a	Panels with images, personal testimonies and information relating to the area, on a wall running alongside the Elizabeth line. The two sections combined measure 1.9 kilometres (1.2 mi) in length, making this one of the longest artworks ever commissioned in the UK.

== Plaistow ==
Image	Title / subject	Location and coordinates	Date	Artist / designer	Type	Designation	Notes
	West Ham Corporation Tramways War Memorial	Greengate Street 51.52749°N 0.02733°E	c. 1920	J. F. Richards	War memorial	Grade II	

== Royal Docks ==
Image	Title / subject	Location and coordinates	Date	Artist / designer	Type	Designation	Notes
More images	Landed	Excel Centre, Royal Victoria Dock 51.50797°N 0.02500°E	2009	Les Johnson	Sculptural group	—N/a	
	Bird Boy (without a tail)	Royal Victoria Dock 51.50761°N 0.01745°E	2011	Laura Ford	Statue	—N/a	A sculpture of a child wearing a bird costume, standing on a pontoon.
More images	Athena	Outside London City Airport 51.50458°N 0.03963°E	2012	Nasser Azam	Statue	—N/a	Unveiled 5 July 2012. This is the tallest bronze sculpture in the UK, at 12 metres high. The sculptor grew up in the borough.
	Types of Happiness	Royal Docks 51.50774°N 0.01896°E	2019 (created), 2023 (installed)	Yinka Ilori	Sculpture	—N/a	Two 10 feet (3.0 m) tall chairs decorated in the style of African wax prints, representing happiness and pride.
More images	Timeless Flight	University of East London Docklands Campus 51.50725°N 0.07006°E	2024	UEL students	Sculpture	—N/a	Sculpture marking the 125th anniversary of the University of East London, in the form of a phoenix as found on the university's coat of arms
	Arrivals + Departures	Compressor House, Dockside Road 51.50843°N 0.04511°E	2025	YARA + DAVINA		—N/a	Two flip-disc displays showing names submitted by the public

== Stratford ==
Image	Title / subject	Location and coordinates	Date	Artist / designer	Type	Designation	Notes
	Statue of William Shakespeare	University of East London Stratford Campus 51.54344°N 0.00906°E	1840	?	Statue	Grade II	A statue in Coade stone, originally made for the Opera House (now Her Majesty's Theatre) in Haymarket. Presented to Stratford by a local councillor, J. C. Carroll, in 1925.
More images	Samuel Gurney Memorial Drinking Fountain	Broadway 51.5409°N 0.0017°E	1861	John Bell	Obelisk	Grade II	
More images	Memorial to the Stratford Martyrs	St John the Evangelist Church, Broadway 51.5415°N 0.0026°E	1878	J. T. Newman	Memorial	Grade II	
	Memorial to Edith Kerrison	The Grove 51.54285°N 0.00402°E	1936	Christine Gregory	Memorial	—N/a	Kerrison was the first female councillor in West Ham.
	Memorial to Gerard Manley Hopkins	Outside Stratford Library, The Grove 51.54265°N 0.00391°E	1994	?	Commemorative stone	—N/a	Unveiled 28 July 1994, the 150th anniversary of the poet's birth, by Seamus Heaney. Hopkins's birthplace was at 87 The Grove; the house was bombed in World War II.
	Railway Tree	Stratford High Street 51°32′21.93″N 0°0′1.33″W	1996	Malcolm Robertson	Sculpture	—N/a	
	Danes Yard Tower	Danes Yard, beside Three Mills Wall River 51.5325°N 0.0085°W	2012	ARC-ML Archichtects	Tower	—N/a	Also known as Strand East Tower and the Olympic Torch sculpture, the wood and galvanised steel tower is 40 metres (130 ft) high and lit at night by LEDs.
More images	Stratford Shoal	Stratford Centre 51.54163°N 0.00167°W	2012	Studio Egret West	Sculpture	—N/a	
More images	Statue of Joan Littlewood	Gerry Raffles Square, outside the Theatre Royal Stratford East 51.54273°N 0.00089°E	2015	Philip Jackson	Statue	—N/a	Unveiled 4 October 2015.

=== Queen Elizabeth Olympic Park ===
Image	Title / subject	Location and coordinates	Date	Artist / designer	Type	Designation	Notes
More images	ArcelorMittal Orbit	Queen Elizabeth Olympic Park 51.53827°N 0.01298°W	2012	Anish Kapoor (with Cecil Balmond)	Sculpture	—N/a	
	Carpenters Curve	Queen Elizabeth Olympic Park 51.53799°N 0.00930°W	2012	Clare Woods	Mural	—N/a	
	Untitled	Queen Elizabeth Olympic Park	2012	D. J. Simpson	Mural	—N/a	
More images	A Place Beyond	Outside V&A East Museum 51.5416°N 0.0139°W	2026	Thomas J. Price	Statue	—N/a	Unveiled 16 March 2026. The 18 ft (5.5 m)–tall sculpture is Price's tallest to date.

== Three Mills ==
Image	Title / subject	Location and coordinates	Date	Artist / designer	Type	Designation	Notes
	Untitled (Juniper)	House Mill 51.52737°N 0.00750°W	2014	Virginia Overton	Sculpture	—N/a	A weather vane in steel and gold leaf featuring a juniper tree, referencing both the artist's origins and a former gin distillery at Three Mills.
	A Moment Without You	Three Mills 51.52659°N 0.00751°W	2017	Tracey Emin	Sculpture	—N/a	Five bronze sculptures of birds mounted on tall poles.
	Reaching Out	Three Mills Green 51.52942°N 0.00665°W	2020	Thomas J. Price	Statue	—N/a	The third sculpture of a black woman in the UK, and the first by a black artist, this is not based on a single person but is a fictional composite of various references. The statue is 9 ft (2.7 m) tall and weighs 420 kilograms.

== Upton Park ==
Image	Title / subject	Location and coordinates	Date	Artist / designer	Type	Designation	Notes
More images	World Cup Sculpture ("The Champions") Bobby Moore, Geoff Hurst, Martin Peters and Ray Wilson	Barking Road and Central Park Road 51.53012°N 0.03796°E	2003	Philip Jackson	Sculptural group	—N/a	

== West Ham ==
Image	Title / subject	Location and coordinates	Date	Artist / designer	Type	Designation	Notes
	Crockett's Leathercloth Works War Memorial	Junction of Abbey Road and Mitre Road 51.5331°N 0.0058°E	After 1918	?	Pylon with sculpture	Grade II	

== Bibliography ==
- Matthews, Peter (2018). London's Statues and Monuments. Oxford: Shire Publications.
