= The Line (art trail) =

Art project in London

The Line is a public art trail in London, opened in 2015, that very roughly follows the path of the Greenwich meridian as it crosses the River Thames. It consists of a set of artworks positioned on a 7.7-kilometre (4.8 mi) walking route starting at the London Stadium, passing down the Lea Valley, crossing the Thames via the London Cable Car, and ending at The O2 in Greenwich. The trail has included works by Anthony Gormley and Tracey Emin.

Map of The Line

== List of artworks ==
Image	Title	Artist	Year	Location	Notes
Please Take a Seat by Mahtab Hussain	Please Take a Seat	Mahtab Hussain	2025	Queen Elizabeth Olympic Park; 51.53943°N 0.01212°W	A contemporary reinterpretation of a Victorian park bench.
	ArcelorMittal Orbit	Anish Kapoor	2012	Queen Elizabeth Olympic Park; 51.53826°N 0.01294°W	Created for the 2012 Summer Olympics and Paralympics, this is the tallest sculpture in the United Kingdom at 115 metres (377 ft) and features two observation decks.
	The Slide	Carsten Höller	2016	Queen Elizabeth Olympic Park; 51.53826°N 0.01294°W	The Slide was added to the ArcelorMittal Orbit in 2016. It is the world's longest tunnel slide at 178 m (584 ft) and riders can reach speeds of up to 24 km/h (15 mph).
	Diver	Ron Haselden	2012	51.53244°N 0.00850°W	Animated light installation showing a person diving into water
Nature in Mind by Madge Gill	Nature in Mind / Untitled	Madge Gill		Three Mills; 51.52745°N 0.00750°W	A series of large-scale reproductions of works by local artist Madge Gill, curated by Sophie Dutton.
	Untitled (Juniper)	Virginia Overton	2014	Three Mills; 51.52737°N 0.00750°W	A weather vane in steel and gold leaf featuring a juniper tree, referencing both the artist's origins and a former gin distillery at Three Mills.
Dreams Are a Language Made of Images by Zineb Sedira	Dreams Are a Language Made of Images	Zineb Sedira	2025	3 Mills Studios; 51.52664°N 0.00670°W	Based on a quote by Federico Fellini.
Untitled The Line by Rasheed Araeen	Untitled The Line	Rasheed Araeen	2025	51.52496°N 0.00761°W	An open cube structure with diagonal support.
	Living Spring	Eva Rothschild	2011	51.52311°N 0.00711°W	4 m (13 ft) tall sculpture of striped steel tubes.
0º00 Navigation Part II A Journey Across Europe and Africa by Simon Faithfull	0°00 Navigation Part II: A Journey Across Europe and Africa	Simon Faithfull	2023	51.52124°N 0.00825°W	Engravings of drawings that Faithfull made during an international journey following the Greenwich Meridian
	DNA DL90	Abigail Fallis	2003	Bow Creek; 51.52037°N 0.00860°W	This 9.3 m (31 ft) tall sculpture is a double helix made up of 22 shopping trolleys. It marks the 50th anniversary of the discovery of the structure of DNA, and the artist considers the trolleys a symbol of modern consumer culture.
Helen Cammock On WindTides - North side	On WindTides	Helen Cammock	2024	51.51877°N 0.00682°W	Steel text on a cable bridge across the River Lea, and a display cabinet of changing artworks made by local residents
	Nature in Mind / Untitled	Madge Gill		Cody Dock; 51.51789°N 0.00209°W	Large-scale reproduction of a work by local artist Madge Gill, spanning the River Lea. One of a series curated by Sophie Dutton.
a cloud + a fence by Katie Schwab	a cloud + a fence	Katie Schwab	2024	Between Cody Dock and Star Lane DLR station 51.52127°N 0.00022°E	Blue shapes and painted street furniture along the route between Cody Dock and Star Lane DLR station
Nature in Mind / Red Women by Madge Gill	Nature in Mind / Red Women	Madge Gill		Star Lane DLR station 51.52048°N 0.00372°E	One in a series of reproductions of works by local artist Madge Gill, curated by Sophie Dutton.
In Between by Hélène Amouzou	In Between	Hélène Amouzou	2025	Royal Docks; 51.50795°N 0.01728°E	Large-scale reproductions of portrait photographs
	Bird Boy (without a tail)	Laura Ford	2011	Royal Docks; 51.50761°N 0.01745°E	A sculpture of a child wearing a bird costume, standing on a pontoon.
	Types of Happiness	Yinka Ilori	2019 (created), 2023 (installed)	Royal Docks; 51.50774°N 0.01896°E	Two 10 feet (3.0 m) tall chairs decorated in the style of African wax prints, representing happiness and pride.
	Sanko-time	Larry Achiampong	2020	London Cable Car; 51.50250°N 0.01165°E	Two audio works designed to be listened to during a journey on the London Cable Car, reflecting on the history of the area and the impacts of colonialism.
	Quantum Cloud	Anthony Gormley	2000	Greenwich Peninsula; 51.50181°N 0.00920°E	29 m (95 ft) tall sculpture, inspired by Gormley's conversations with the physicist Basil Hiley. Originally commissioned for the millennium North Meadow Sculpture Project.
	Liberty Grip	Gary Hume	2008	Greenwich Peninsula; 51.50437°N 0.00509°E	A bronze sculpture with three sections, each modelled on a mannequin's arm.
	Tribe and Tribulation	Serge Attukwei Clottey	2022	Greenwich Peninsula; 51.50482°N 0.00198°E	A 5.5m tall totemic sculpture made of 1.4m cubes of reclaimed wood, including timber from Ghanaian fishing boats, and an embedded sound installation.
	A Slice of Reality	Richard Wilson	2000	Greenwich Peninsula; 51.50414°N 0.00024°W	A sliced section through the former sand dredger Arco Trent. Originally commissioned for the millennium North Meadow Sculpture Project.
	Here	Thomson & Craighead	2013	Greenwich Peninsula; 51.50316°N 0.00146°W	This sculpture is located on the Greenwich meridian and is a UK road sign displaying the 24,859-mile (40,007 km) distance around the Earth back to its position.

== Former works ==
Several works were previously part of The Line, but have since been removed.

Image	Title	Artist	Created	Added	Removed	Location	Notes
	Inhibition Point	James Balmforth	2015	April 2016	January 2017		
	Work No.700	Martin Creed	2007	May 2015	December 2016	Royal Docks; 51.5077°N 0.01887°E	
	Sensation	Damien Hirst	2003	May 2015	November 2019		
	Vulcan	Eduardo Paolozzi	1999	May 2015	June 2017		
	Network	Thomas J. Price	2013	May 2015	November 2019		
	Reaching Out	Thomas J. Price	2020		August 2022	Three Mills Green; 51.52942°N 0.00665°W	The third sculpture of a black woman in the UK, and the first by a black artist, this is not based on a single person but is a fictional composite of various references. The statue is 9 feet (2.7 m) tall and weighs 420 kilograms.
	Consolidator #654321	Sterling Ruby		May 2015	August 2019	The Crystal	
	The Hatchling	Joanna Rajkowska	2019				Large replica of a blackbird egg. This was a mixed media work and sound equipment played the noises made by chicks as they prepare to hatch.
	Transfiguration Series	Bill Viola		May 2015	August 2015	House Mill, Three Mills; 51.52742°N 0.00785°W	
	No. 1104 Catching Colour	Rana Begum	2022			London City Island; 51.51148°N 0.00577°E	Clouds of coloured mesh, suspended above a path.
	A Moment Without You	Tracey Emin	2017	July 2021	November 2024	51.52659°N 0.00751°W	Five bronze sculptures of birds mounted on tall poles.
	A Bullet from a Shooting Star	Alex Chinneck	2015	2015	July 2025	Greenwich Peninsula; 51.50124°N 0.00057°W	A sculpture of an electricity pylon balanced at an angle on its tip. It is 35 metres (115 ft) tall and weighs 15 tonnes. Originally commissioned for the 2015 London Design Festival.
	Nature in Mind / Untitled	Madge Gill				51.53542°N 0.01171°W	10 large-scale reproductions of works by local artist Madge Gill, part of a series curated by Sophie Dutton.
	The Living Line	Somang Lee	2022			51.53555°N 0.00803°W	Watercolour illustrations of plants and wildlife found along the trail. Some of the illustrations were created by local school children.
	Nature in Mind / Untitled	Madge Gill				Royal Docks; 51.50789°N 0.01740°E	6 large-scale reproductions of works by local artist Madge Gill, part of a series curated by Sophie Dutton.
	What I Hear I Keep	Larry Achiampong	2020			Royal Docks 51.50751°N 0.02058°E	Pan-African flag designed by the artist
