= A Slice of Reality =

Sculpture by Richard Wilson

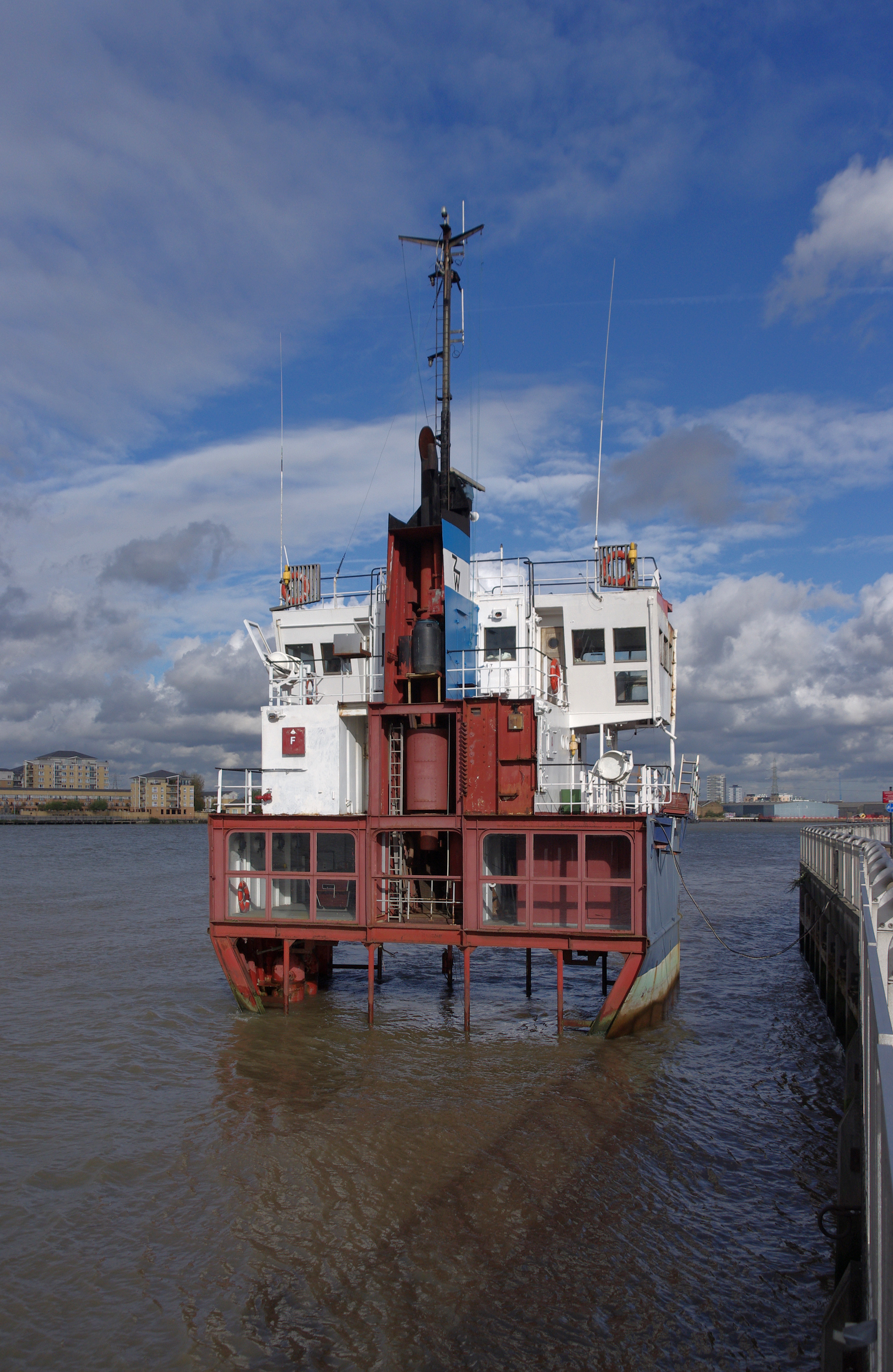
- Artist: Richard Wilson
- Year: 2000
- Medium: Ship
- Dimensions: 9 m (30 ft)
- Location: London; 51.504147°N 0.0003°W

A Slice of Reality is a work of modern art by Richard Wilson sitting by (and commissioned for) the Millennium Dome on the north-western bank of the Greenwich Peninsula. It consists of a 9-metre (30 ft) sliced vertical section through the former 800-ton The 60-metre (200 ft) sand dredger Arco Trent and exposes portions of the former living quarters of the vessel to the elements (such as a visible pool table in the lower decks). The ship had been built at Appledore Shipbuilders in Devon in 1971 and scrapped in Middlesbrough in 1999.

The work is one of the sculptures on The Line art trail in East London. It was originally commissioned for the millennium "North Meadow Sculpture Project".

== Gallery ==
These photographs were taken during Open House London 2015.

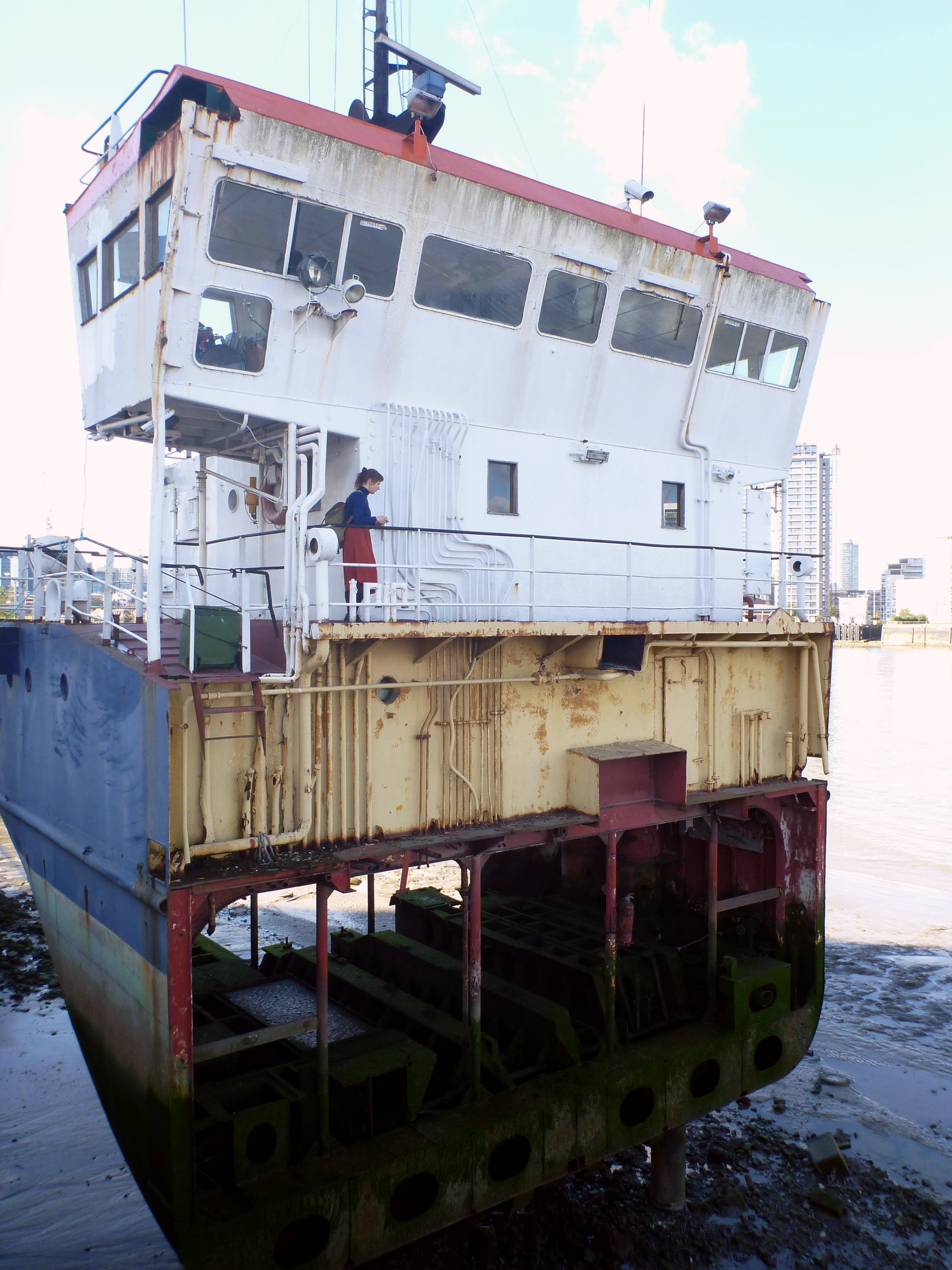
View from bow

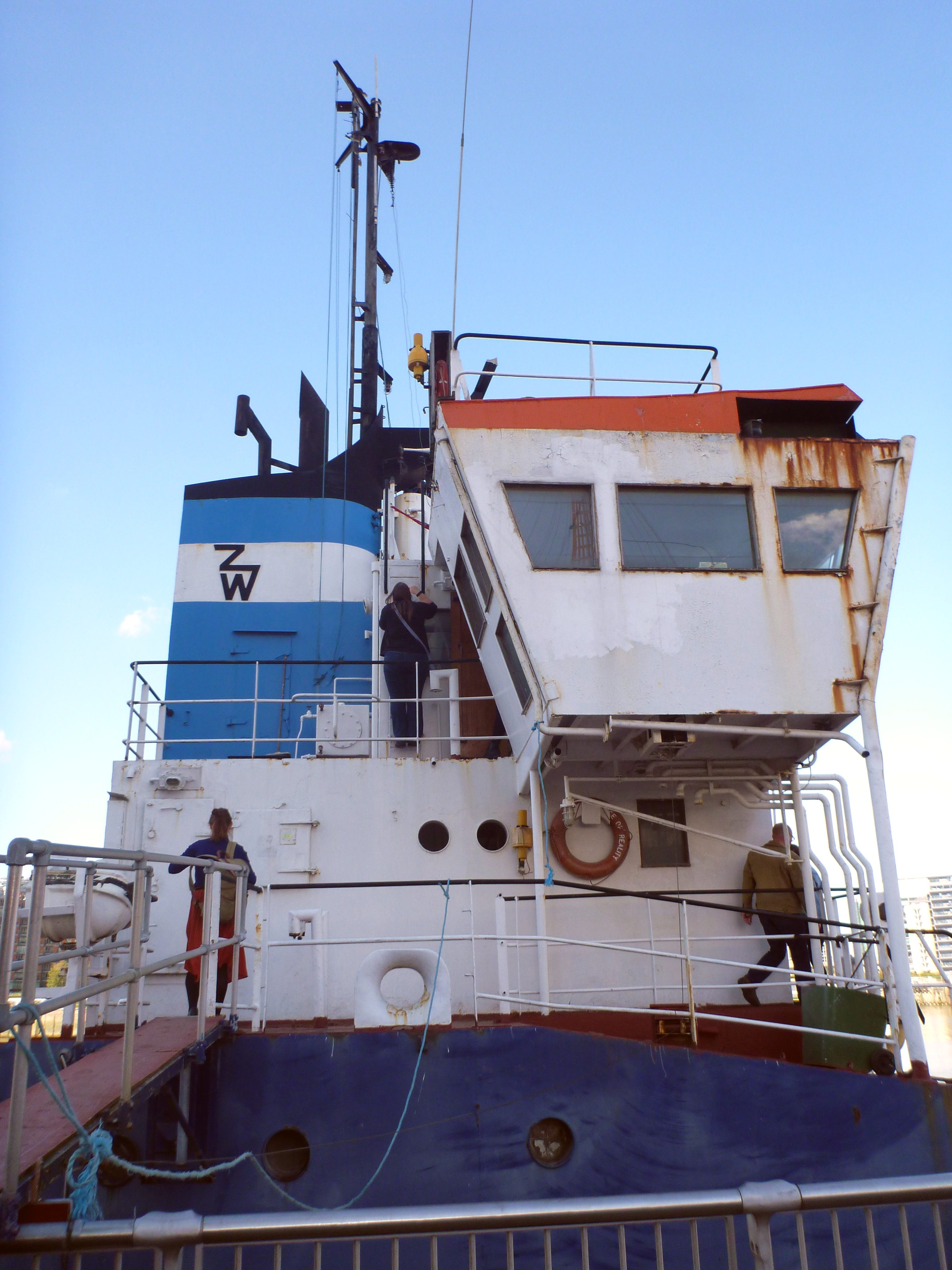
View from starboard
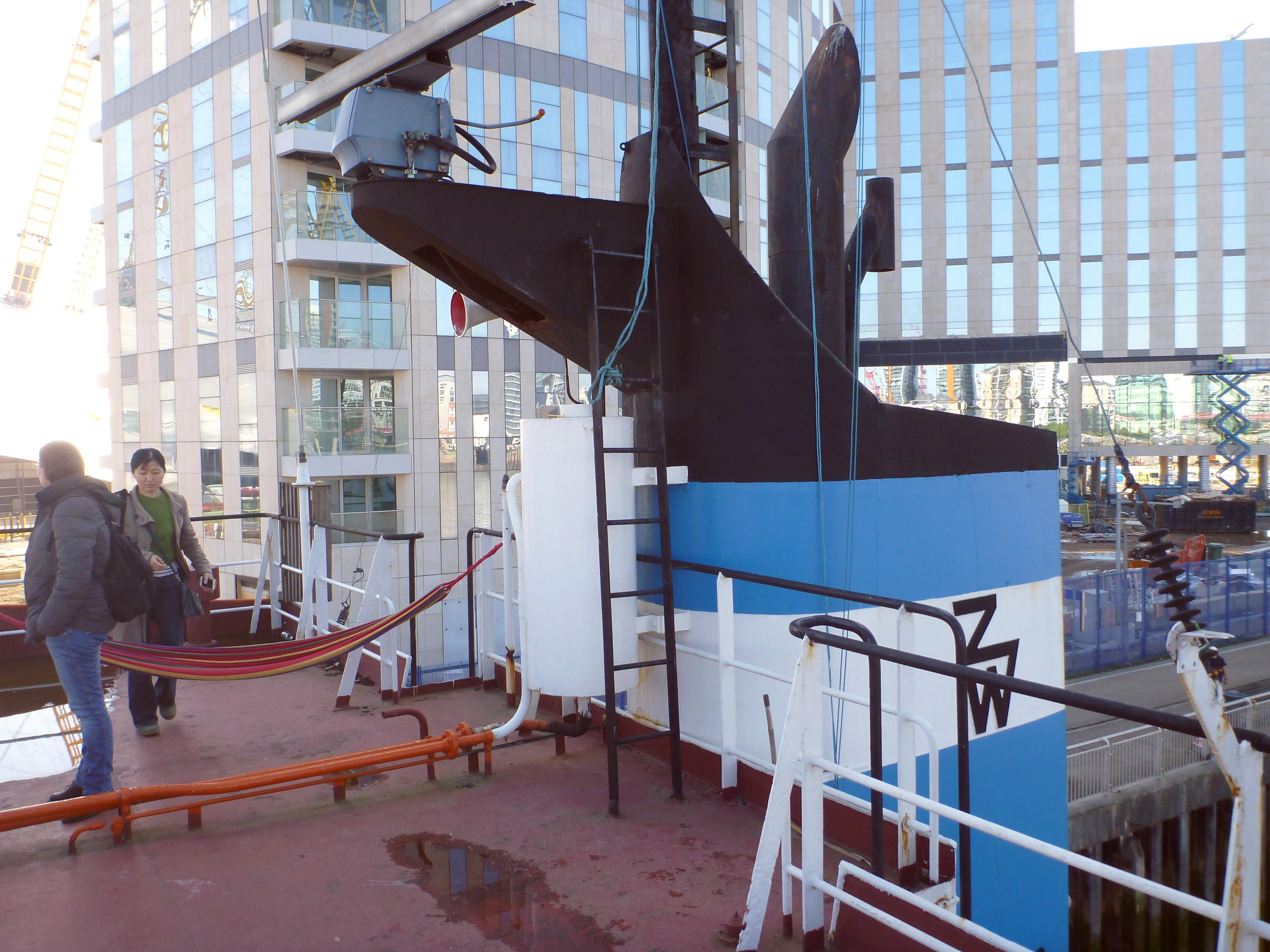
The weather deck

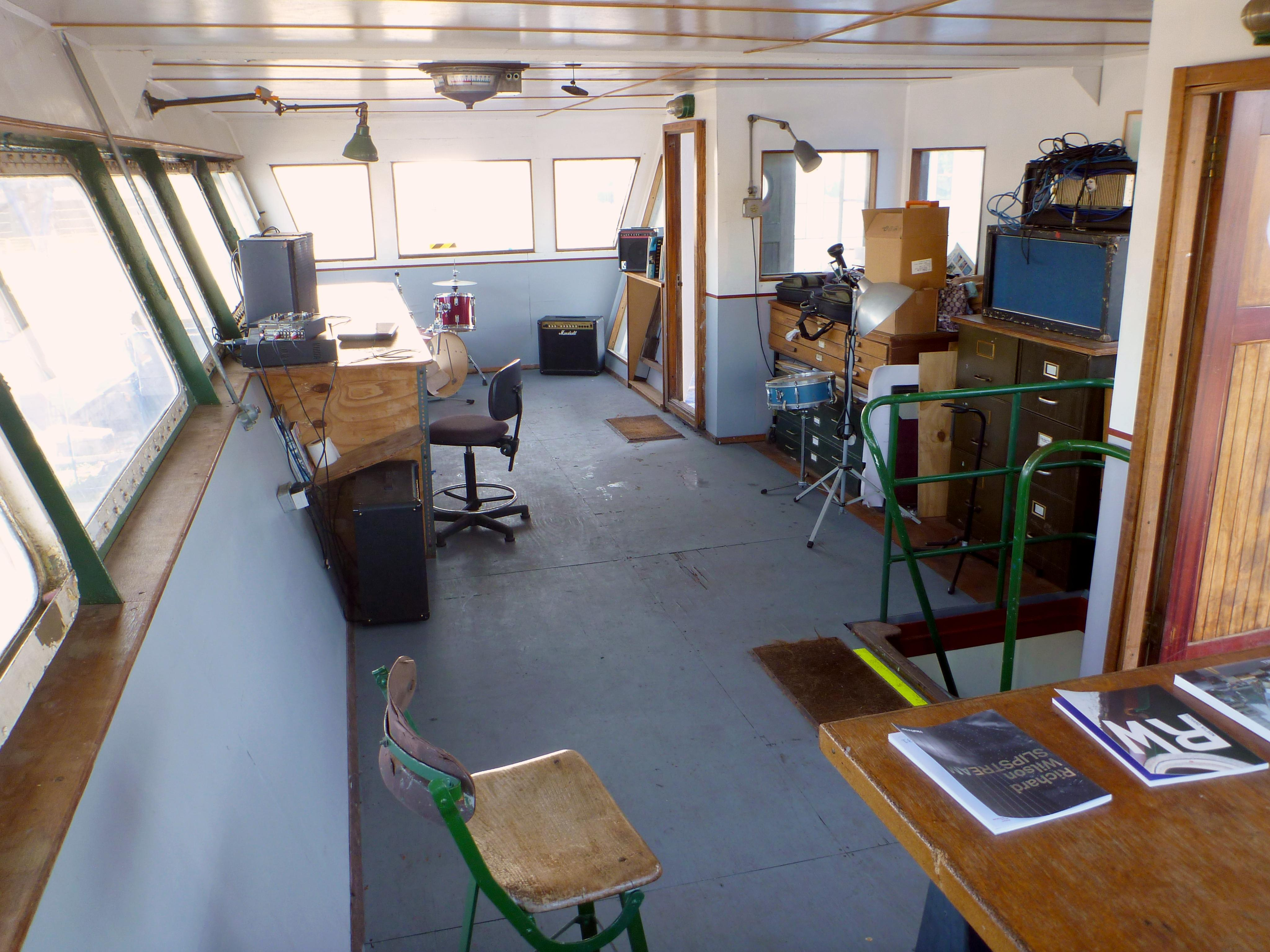
The bridge

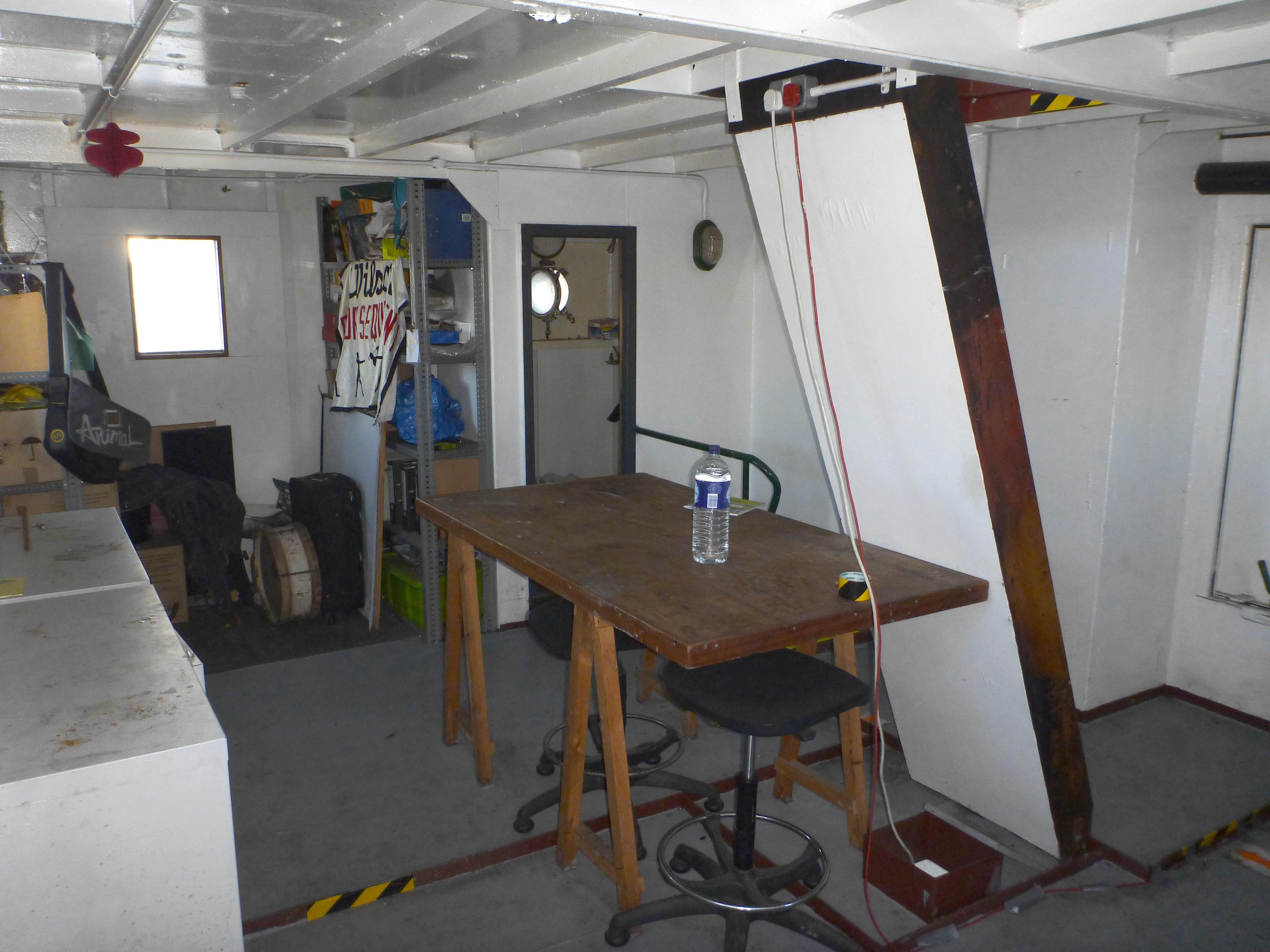
The poop deck

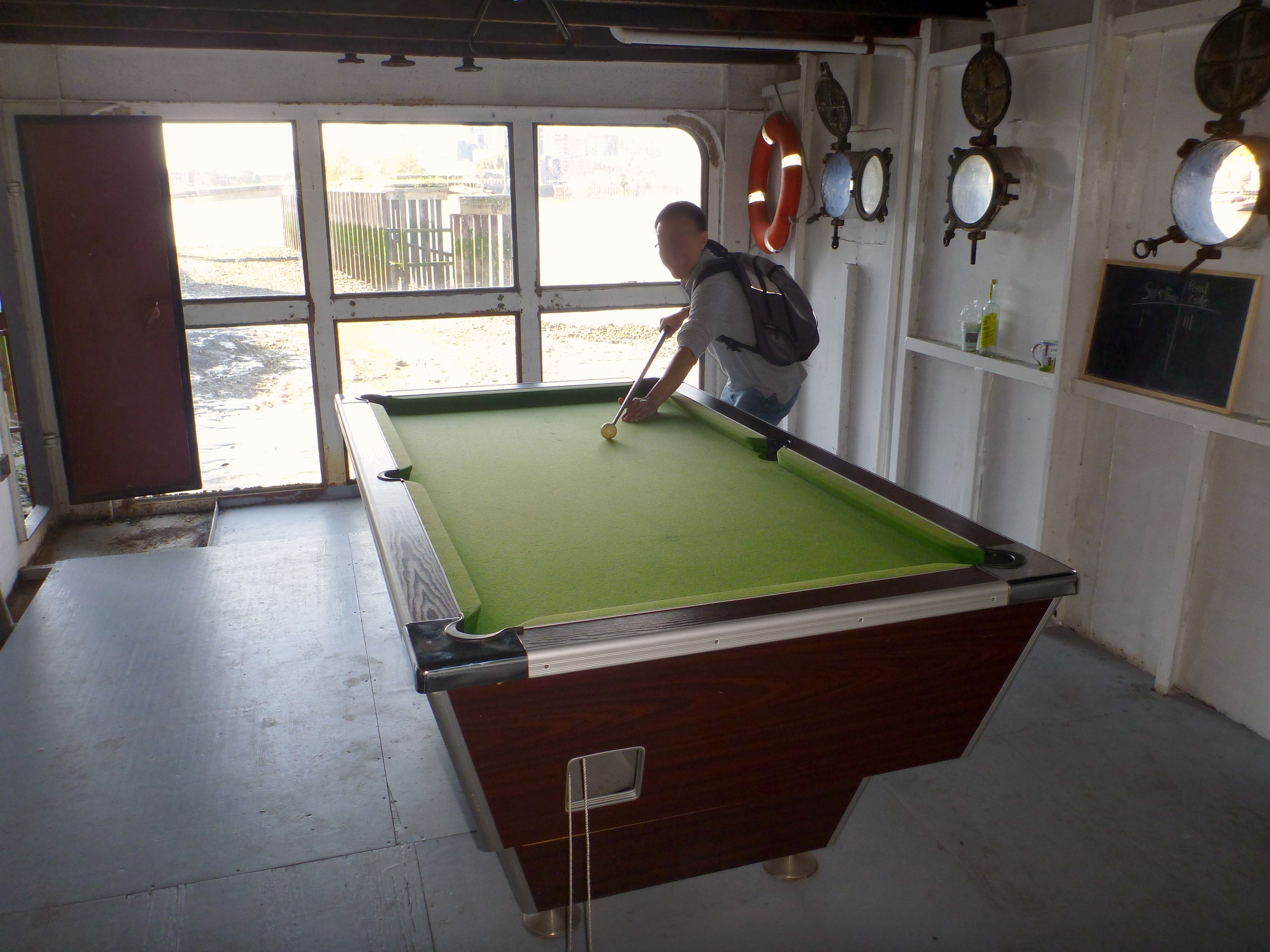
Accommodation deck
