= Here (sculpture) =

Public artwork, London, England

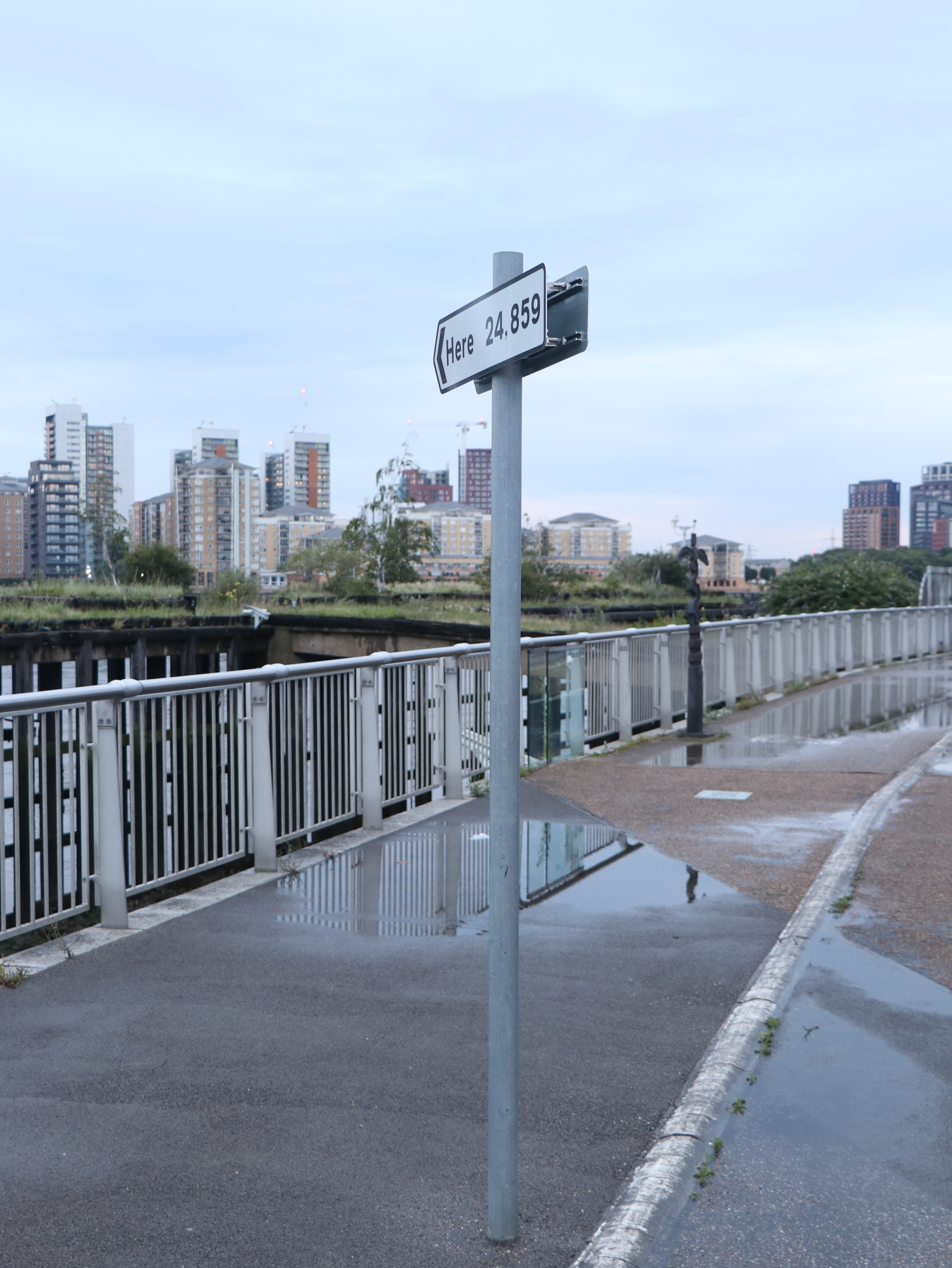
- Artwork on The Line in north Greenwich, London, looking northwards
- Artist: Thomson & Craighead
- Year: 2013
- Medium: Metal
- Dimensions: 2.64 m × 0.12 m × 0.82 m (8.7 ft × 0.39 ft × 2.7 ft)
- Location: North Greenwich, London; 51.50316°N 0.00146°W
- Website: the-line.org

Here is a 2013 artwork created by artist duo Thomson & Craighead. The work, a standard UK road sign pointing northwards, is situated on a riverside path on the west side of the Greenwich Peninsula in south-east London, where it forms part of The Line, a public art trail that very roughly follows the path of the Prime Meridian as it crosses the River Thames.

== History ==
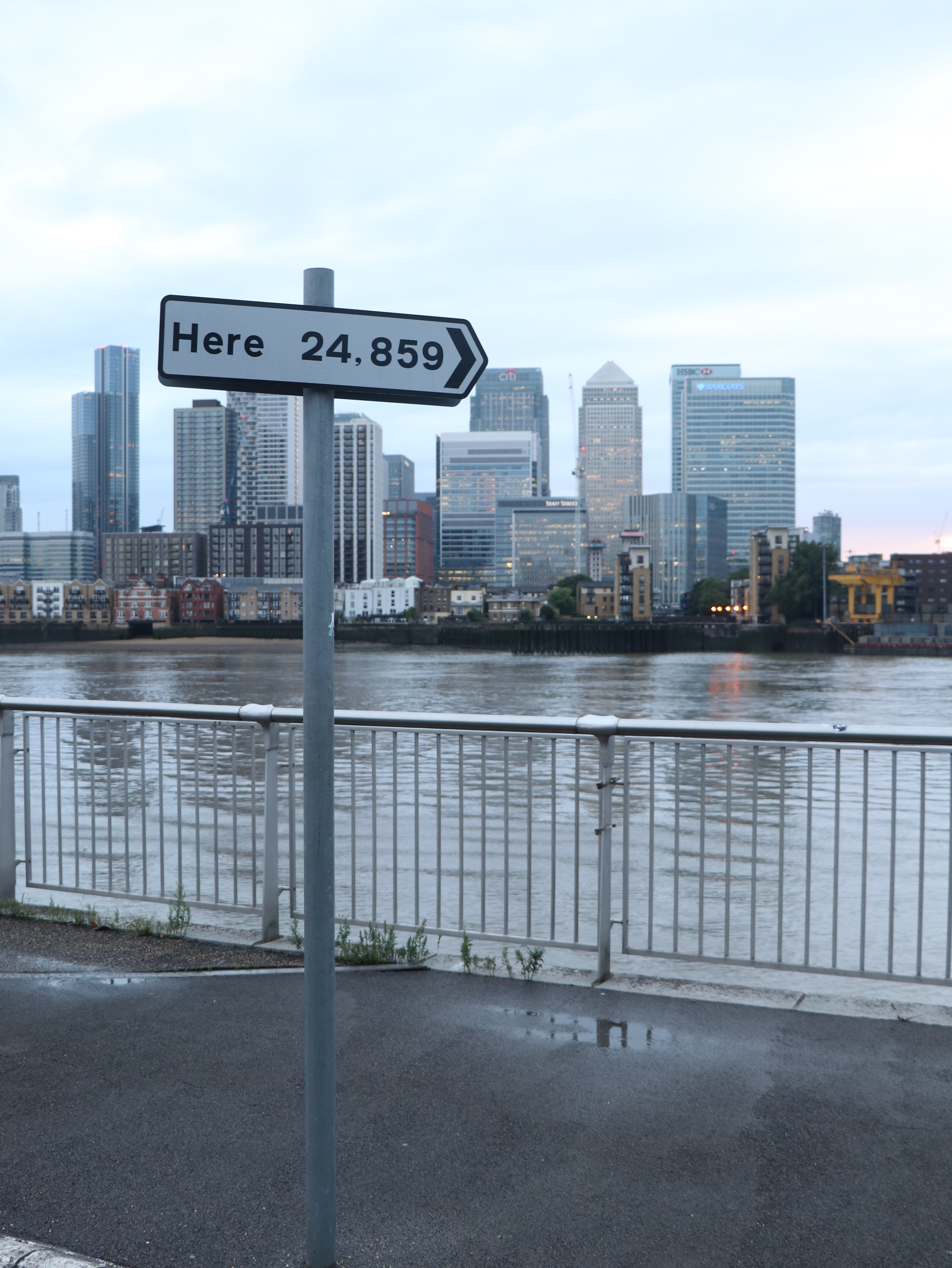
Here, viewed from the east, with Canary Wharf in the background

Created by Thomson & Craighead in 2013, Here is formed by a standard 2.64-metre (8 ft 8 in) tall UK road sign pointing north and displaying the 24,859-mile (40,007 km) distance around the circumference of the Earth back to the sign's position. Maggie Gray in art magazine Apollo said: "Such pieces command attention and, once they have it, direct that attention outwards to their surroundings, or back on to the viewer."

In 2014 it was one of nine works chosen from over 70 submissions for the inaugural year of The Line, an art project distributed along a 3-mile (4.8 km) route following some of London's waterways between Stratford and North Greenwich. The route opened in 2015. The five Greenwich elements of The Line also form part of an art trail across the Greenwich Peninsula.
