= Moments Contained =

Bronze sculpture in Rotterdam

Coordinates: 51°55′23.66″N 4°28′14.02″E

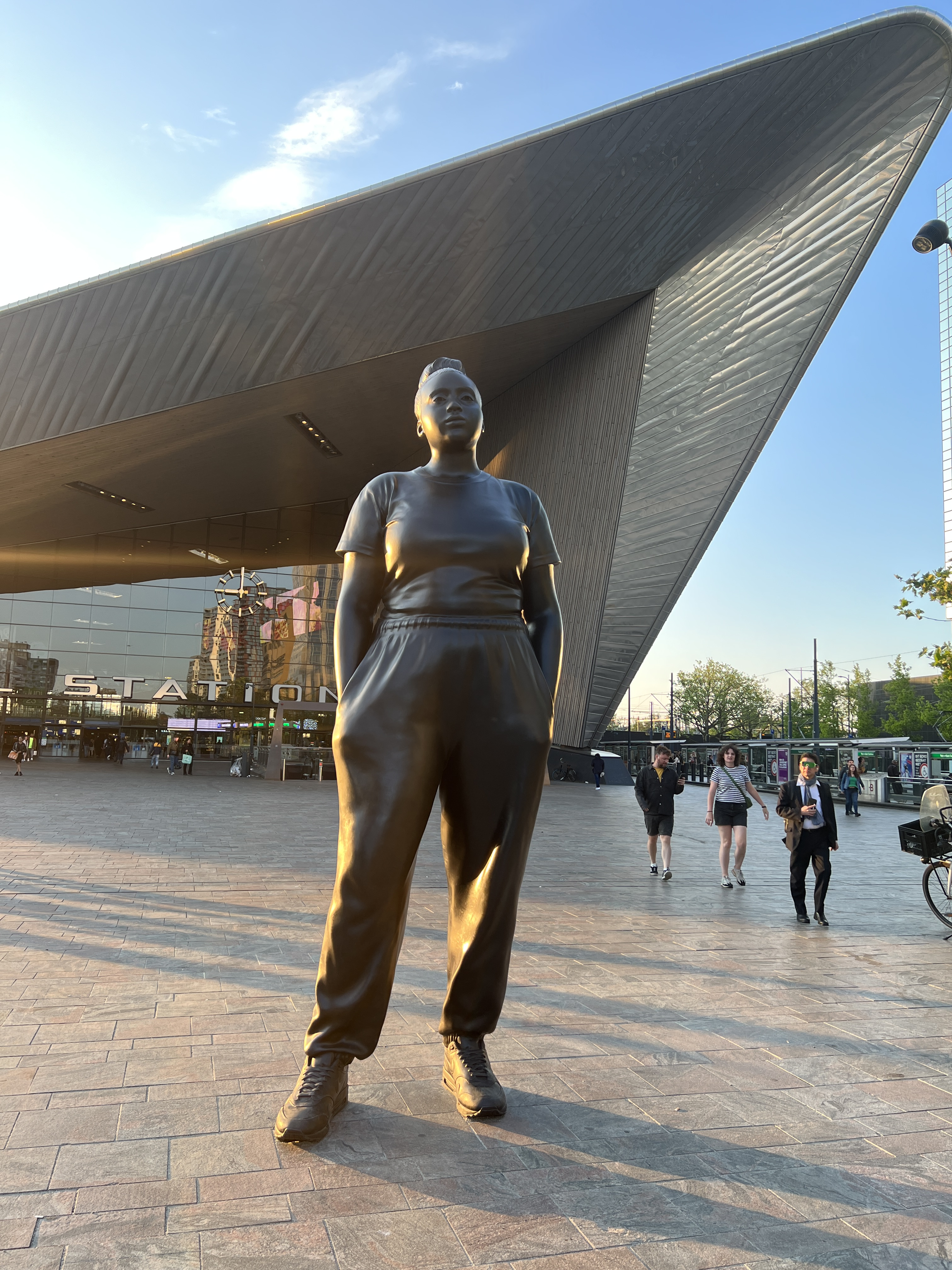
- Interactive map of Moments Contained
- Location: Stationsplein, Rotterdam, the Netherlands
- Designer: Thomas J Price
- Material: Bronze
- Height: 365,7 cm (12 ft)
- Completion date: 2022
- Website: Official website
- Reveal date: 2023

Moments Contained is a 2022-2023 bronze sculpture on the Stationsplein, in front of Rotterdam Centraal station, Rotterdam, the Netherlands. It was created by artist Thomas J Price, a London-based artist with Caribbean roots. A similar statue is on display at the Victoria and Albert Museum in London.

== Description ==
The sculpture is almost four metres tall and depicts a fictional, young Black woman. She stands erect and appears confident. The knuckles of her clenched hands are visible in her trouser pockets, suggesting the woman may be less casual than she appears at first glance. She stands on the ground, rather than on a pedestal.

The woman is the same fictional character as the person in the sculpture Reaching Out (2020) in London.

== Creation and reveal ==
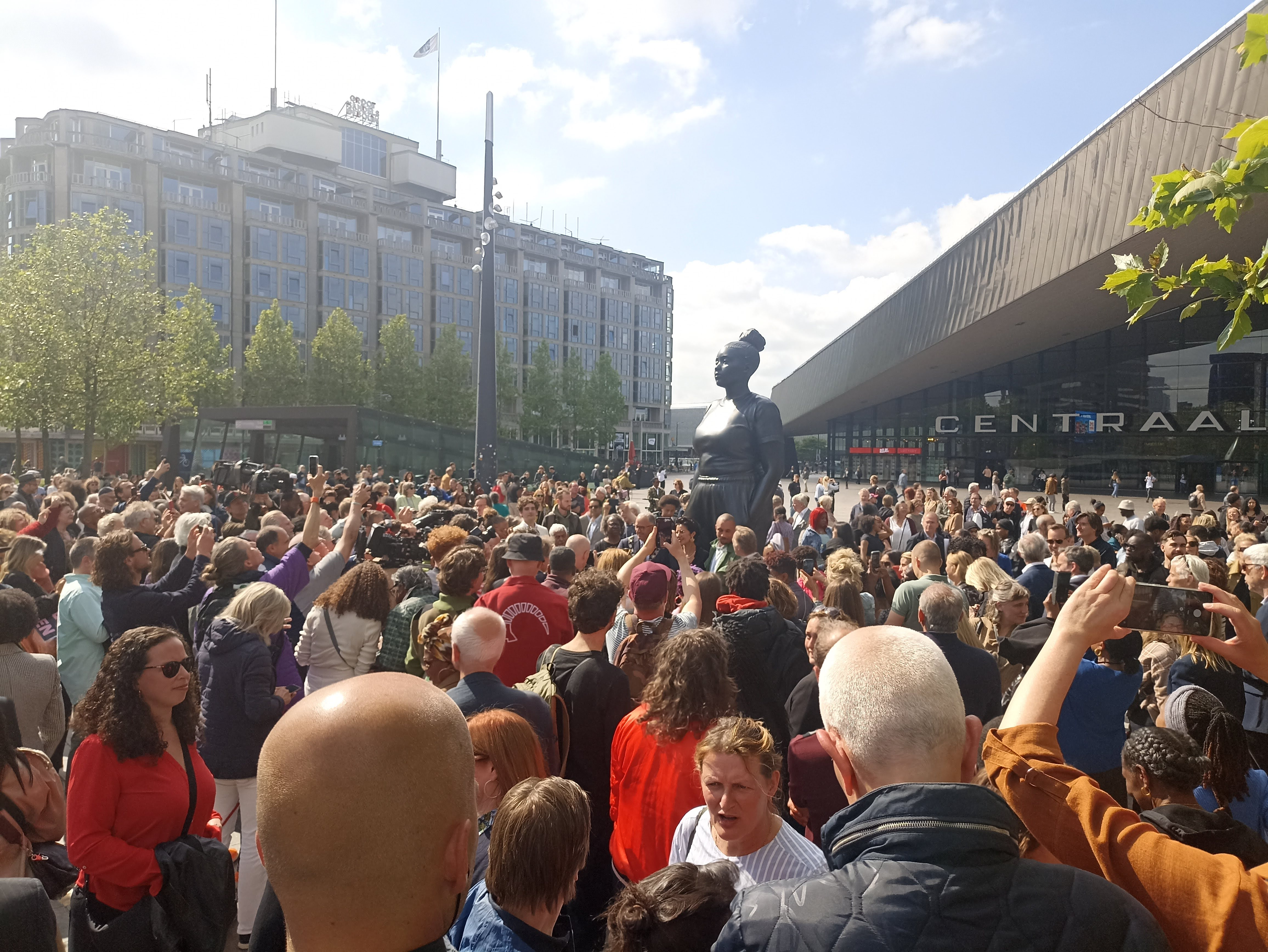
Unveiling of Moments Contained by Thomas J. Price at Rotterdam's stationsplein with, among others, former Mayor of Rotterdam Ahmed Aboutaleb and former State Secretary for Culture and Media Gunay Uslu.

Moments Contained was shown at Art Basel in 2022, and was unveiled on location in Rotterdam on 2 June 2023 in the presence of the artist, former State Secretary Gunay Uslu, and Rotterdam's former Mayor Ahmed Aboutaleb. The sculpture was donated to the city by Stichting Droom en Daad, the philanthropic fund of the Van der Vorm family. It is scheduled to stand in this location for five years, after which the site will be evaluated. It will be part of Rotterdam's International Sculpture Collection.
