= Madge Gill =

British artist (1882–1961)

- Born: Maud Eades; 19 January 1882; Walthamstow, England
- Died: 28 January 1961 (aged 79); Leytonstone, England
- Education: Self-taught (Outsider artist)
- Occupation: Visual artist
- Known for: Pen-and-ink drawing
- Style: Visionary art; Horror vacui
- Movement: Art brut; Spiritualism
- Memorials: § Recognition

Madge Gill (born Maude Ethel Eades; 1882–1961) was an English outsider and visionary artist.

== Early years ==
Maude Ethel Eades was born on 19 January 1882, in East Ham, Essex, (now Greater London). She was considered an illegitimate child and spent much of her early years in seclusion because her family couldn't stand the embarrassment. At age nine, despite her mother still being alive, she was placed in Dr. Barnardo's Girls' Village Home orphanage at Barkingside, Ilford, Essex.

In 1896, she was sent to Canada by Dr. Barnardo's Homes as a British Home Child, arriving aboard the S.S. Scotsman as one of a group of 254 children destined to become farm labourers and domestic servants for Canadian families. Upon arrival at Quebec City, she and the other girls in her travel party were taken by train to Barnardo's Hazelbrae Home in Peterborough, Ontario before being sent out on placements as domestics. Her name, Maud Eades, can be found inscribed on the "Additions and Corrections" side panel installed on the Hazelbrae Barnardo Home Memorial in Peterborough in 2019. After spending her teenage years working as a domestic servant and caregiver for young children on a series of Ontario farms, she managed to move back to East Ham in 1900 to live with her aunt, who introduced her to Spiritualism and astrology. During that time, she found work as a nurse at Whipps Cross Hospital, in Leytonstone.

At the age of 25, she married her cousin, Thomas Edwin Gill, a stockbroker. Together they had three sons; their second son Reginald died of the Spanish flu. The following year she gave birth to a stillborn baby girl and almost died herself, contracting a serious illness that left her bedridden for several months and blind in her left eye.

== Artistic works ==
During her illness, in 1920, Gill – now thirty-eight – took a sudden and passionate interest in drawing, creating thousands of allegedly mediumistic works over the following 40 years, most done with ink in black and white. The works came in all sizes, from postcard-sized to huge sheets of fabric, some over 30 feet (9.1 m) long. She claimed to be guided by a spirit she called "Myrninerest" (my inner rest) and often signed her works in this name. As American scholar Daniel Wojcik noted, "like other Spiritualists, Gill did not attribute her art to her own abilities, but considered herself to be a physical vessel through which the spirit world could be expressed." However, she experimented with a wide variety of media including knitting, writing, weaving, and crochet work. Extremely prolific, she was capable of completing dozens of drawings in a single night. The figure of a young woman in intricate dress appeared thousands of times in her work and is often thought to be a representation of herself or her lost daughter, and in general female subjects dominate her work. Her drawings are characterised by geometric chequered patterns and organic ornamentation, with the blank staring eyes of female faces and their flowing clothing interweaving into the surrounding complex patterns.

In 1922, Gill became a patient of Dr Helen Boyle after Thomas Gill contacted the Essex Voluntary Association for the Blind, concerned for his wife's mental health. Dr Boyle admitted Gill for treatment at the Lady Chichester Hospital in Hove, known for progressive and kind treatment of women, and is thought to have been encouraging about Gill's creation of art.

In 1939, she exhibited one of her works at the Whitechapel Gallery. It was probably one of her largest works, measuring 40 metres long, covering an entire wall in the gallery. She continued to exhibit her work each year at the Whitechapel Gallery up until 1947.

In 1942, from 1 July to August 4, she exhibited a large calico at the Artist Aid Russia Exhibition at the Wallace Collection, Hertford House, London.

== Later years ==
Gill rarely exhibited her work and never sold any pieces out of fear of angering "Myrninerest". After her firstborn son, Bob, died in 1958, she started drinking heavily and stopped drawing. Following her death in 1961, thousands of drawings were discovered in her home; the collection is owned by the London Borough of Newham and is in the care of the borough's Heritage and Archives Service. Her work has been exhibited internationally at venues including The Los Angeles County Museum of Art, USA (1992), Manor Park Museum, London (1999), The Whitechapel Gallery, London (2006), Slovak National Gallery, Bratislava (2007), Halle Saint Pierre (Musée d'Art Brut & Art Singulier), Paris (2008, 2014), Kunsthalle Schirn, Frankfurt a.M. (2010), Collection de l'Art Brut, Lausanne (2005, 2007).

== Exhibitions ==
From 5 October 2013 to 26 January 2014, Gill's work was displayed at the Orleans House Gallery curated by Roger Cardinal, Mark De Novellis, Henry Boxer and Vivienne Roberts.

A major trilogy of exhibitions, showing over 600 of Gill's works, many previously unseen, took place at The Nunnery Gallery in London. It opened in May 2012 and lasted until January 2013.

In summer 2019 Sophie Dutton curated Myrninerest at the William Morris Gallery in Walthamstow, which included "newly uncovered large-scale embroideries, textiles and archival objects, many of which [had] never been exhibited before".

Some of her drawings are on permanent view in The Viktor Wynd Museum of Curiosities, Fine Art & Natural History, whilst others are held by the London Borough of Newham Heritage Service.

Her work Crucifixion of the Soul (1936) was shown at the Venice Biennale in 2024, curated by Adriano Pedrosa.

Some of her works are part of the Zander Collection, Cologne.

In 2025 some works were presented in the Grand Palais in Paris at the exhibition "Dans l'intimité d'une collection, Donation Decharme au Centre Pompidou" and at the Wallace Collection in the exhibition "Grayson Perry: Delusions of Grandeur".

== Solo exhibitions ==
- 2023 National Museum of Art of Catalonia, Barcelona, (with Josefa Tolrà)
- 2018 William Morris Gallery, Walthamstow, 2019 (publication)
- 1992 Collection de l’Art Brut, Lausanne
- 1992 Whitechapel Gallery, London,
- 1978 Collection de l'art brut, Lausanne,

== Group Exhibitions ==
- 2025 Kunstmuseum, Basel, "Ghosts, Visualizing the Supernatural"
- 2025 Power Station of Art, Shangai, "A Walk on the Wild Side: Artworks from the Collection de l'Art Brut and Elsewhere", 2025, (Publication)
- 2025 Tokyo Shibuya Koen-dori Gallery, Museum of Contemporary Art Tokyo, Tokyo,
- 2025 Wallace Collection , "Grayson Perry: Delusions of Grandeur" 2025
- 2025 Galerie du Marché, Lausanne "25 ans de plaisir"
- 2024 Venice Biennale, "Foreigners Everywhere" Padiglione Centrale, Venice,
- 2024 Villa Medici , Roma, "Epopées Célestes" '
- 2019 "Flying High, Künstlerinnen der Art Brut" Bank Austria Kunstforum, Wien,
- 2019 American Folk Art, New York "Art Brut in America : the Incursion of Jean Dubuffet",
- 2013 Halle Saint-Pierre, Paris, " Raw Vision, 25 ans d'art brut"
- 2006 Tate Britain, " Outsider Art", London, 2006
- 2015 Palais idéal du facteur Cheval, Hauterives, "Elévation, hommage des collectionneurs Bruno Decharme & Antoine de Galbert à Joseph Ferdinand Cheval",
- 2013 Halle Saint-Pierre, Paris, "Raw vision, 25 ans d'art brut"
- 2011 LaM – Lille Métropole Museum of Modern, Contemporary and Outsider Art, Amicalement brut, collection Eternod-Mermod.(Publication)
- 2011 Caboches. Galerie du marché, Lausanne,
- 2006 Tate Britain, " Outsider Art", London,
- 2001 Waldemarsudde Museum, "Solitärer. Sarlingskonst fran Samling Eternod - Mermod," Stockholm. (Publication)
- 2000 L’Art Brut: Jean Dubuffet and the Outsiders, Louis Stern Fine Arts, West Hollywood
- 2000 Kunstmuseum Malmö, "Solitärer. Sarlingskonst fran Samling Eternod - Mermod", Malmö, (Publication)
- 1999 Halle Saint-Pierre, Paris, Art Spirite Mediumnique Visionnaire Messages D’Outre-Monde
- 1998 Castello Visconteo di Pavia, Pavia, Figure della anima, arte irregolare in Europa (publication)
- 1997 Musée de la Création Franche, Bègles, Collection Eternod-Mermod, (publication)
- 1993 Museo Reina Sofía, Madrid, 1993Visiones paralelas. Artistas modernos y arte marginal. (Publication)
- 1993 Kunsthalle Basel, Parallel Visions.
- 1992 Los Angeles County Museum of Art, Los Angeles, 1992 Parallel Visions. (publication)
- 1987 Dubuffet & Art Brut, Peggy Guggenheim Collection, Venise, (Publication)
- 1986 Rosa Esman Gallery, "European Outsiders", New York
- 1978 Musée d'art moderne, Paris "les singuliers de l'art" Paris,(publication)
- 1976 Leeds Playhouse, Drawings by Madge Gill, Leeds Playhouse
- 1976 Folkestone, Arts Centre, New Metropole
- 1974 Washington State University "A selection from the Newham Collection at Washington State University"
- 1972 Canterbury, Mediumistic Drawings Slater Art Gallery, Canterbury
- 1969 East Ham Town Hall, London, Exhibition of drawings bequeathed to Newham by Laurie Gill, East Ham Town Hall
- 1947 East End Academy, London
- 1942 Wallace Collection, London, "Artists Aid Russia"
- 1942 East End Academy, London
- 1939 Whitechapel Gallery, London
- 1932 Whitechapel Gallery, London
- 1930 East End Academy, London

== Recognition ==
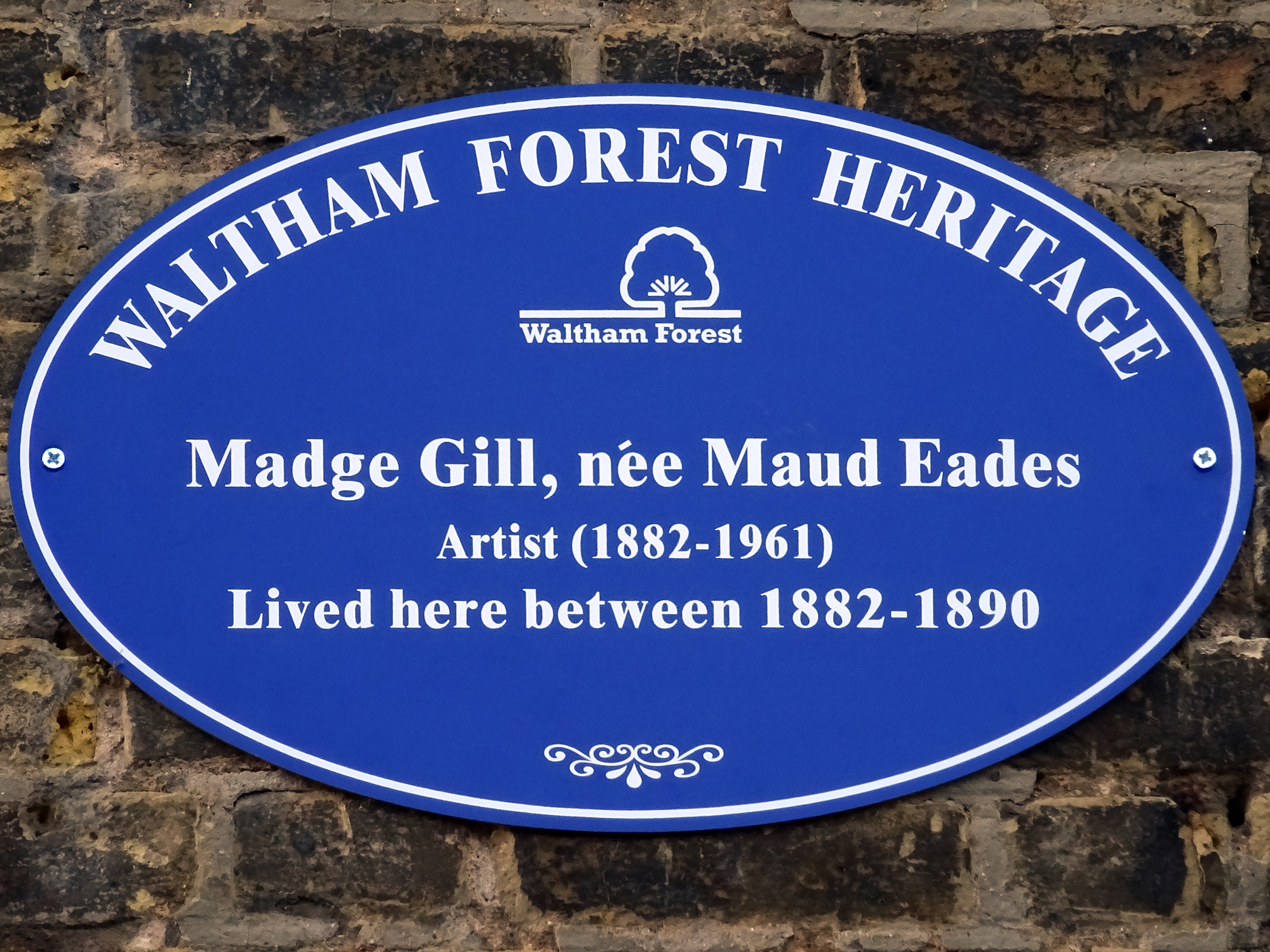
Waltham Forest Heritage commemorative plaque at 71 High Street, Walthamstow, London E17

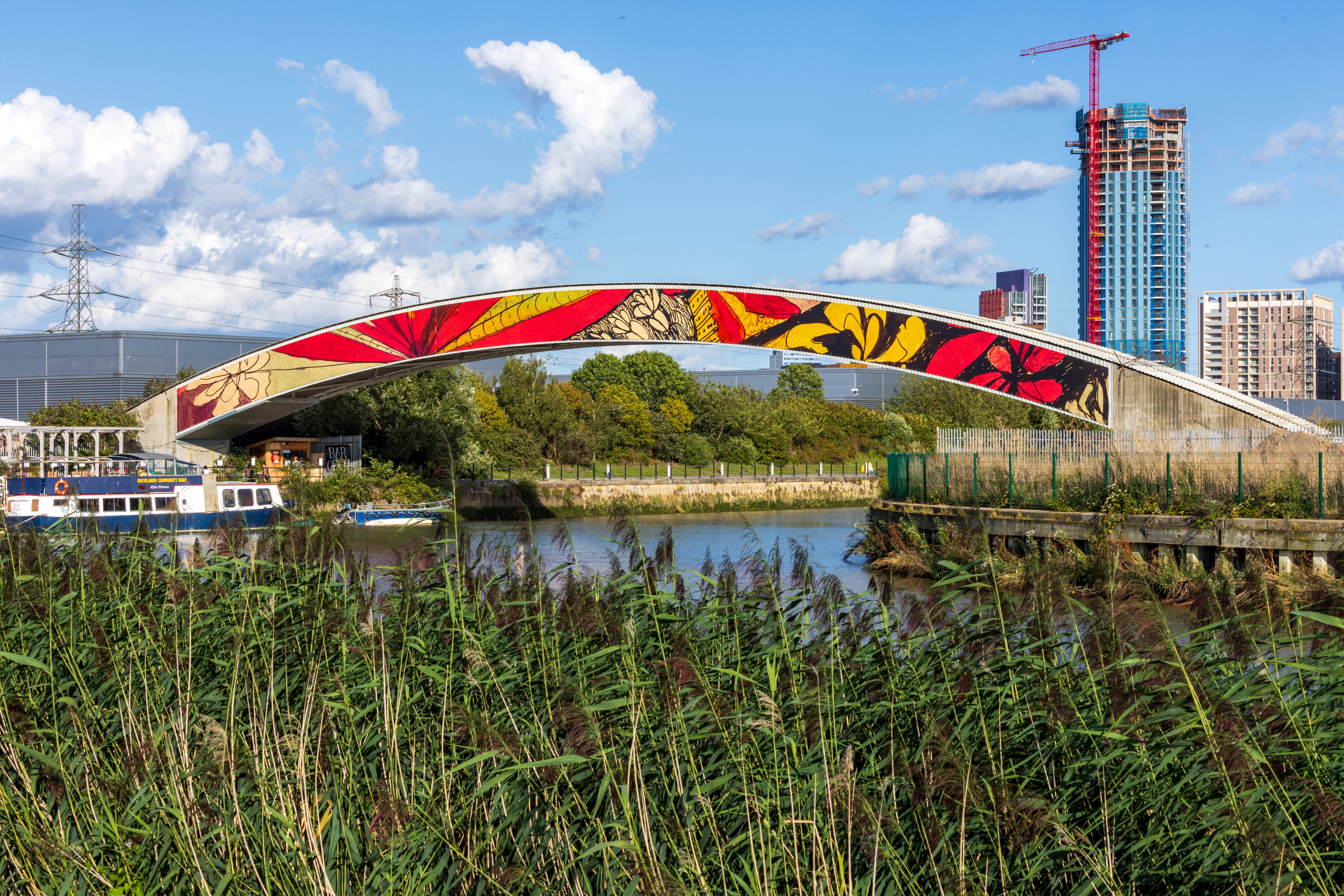
Reproduction from one of Gill's work on a bridge over Bow Creek, London, part of The Line art trail

Madge Gill, like many outsider artists, has continually been gaining fame since her death in 1961. Her work is part of the permanent collection at the Collection de l'Art Brut in Lausanne, Switzerland, one of the central venues for the exhibition and support of outsider art.

In 2013, admirer David Tibet, himself an outsider artist, published an antiquarian-style book solely devoted to her work, the first of its kind. Tibet's musical project with James Blackshaw, active in 2012, was named Myrninerest.

On 8 March 2018 a blue plaque commemorating Gill was erected at 71 High Street, Walthamstow, where she was born in 1882 and lived until 1890.

In 2021, an exhibition Nature in mind curated by Sophie Dutton and consisting of 20 reproductions of her work was installed at various locations in east London as part of The Line art trail.
