= Grounded in the Stars =

Sculpture by British artist Thomas J Price

- Artist: Thomas J Price
- Location: New York City, New York, U.S.

Grounded in the Stars is a 12-foot (3.7 m)-tall bronze sculpture by British artist Thomas J Price. It depicts a young black woman.

In 2025, the sculpture was temporarily installed in Times Square as an exhibit scheduled to last from April 29 through June 17, 2025. The sculpture's features are a combination of qualities that Price observed in black women he came across. As explained in the description, Grounded in the Stars "disrupts traditional ideas around what defines a triumphant figure and challenges who should be rendered immortal through monumentalization."

The sculpture has received a mixed reaction.
