= Thomas J Price =

British sculptor (born 1981)

- Born: c. 1981 (age 44–45)
- Education: Chelsea College of Arts; Royal College of Art
- Occupation: Sculptor
- Known for: Reaching Out (2020), Moments Contained (2022)

Thomas J Price (born c. 1981) is a British sculptor. Reaching Out, his first individual full figure representation of a woman, has been shown as part of the art project The Line in the East End of London. He was also selected to create an artwork, unveiled in 2022, commemorating the Windrush generation for Hackney Town Hall.

Price studied at Chelsea College of Arts and the Royal College of Art. There have been major exhibitions of his work at the National Portrait Gallery, the Yorkshire Sculpture Park, and The Power Plant Contemporary Art Gallery, Toronto. On 8 May 2025, Price's 12-feet bronze statue of a black woman, Grounded in the Stars, was unveiled in New York City's Times Square and was on view there until 17 June 2025.

== Works ==
=== Reaching Out ===
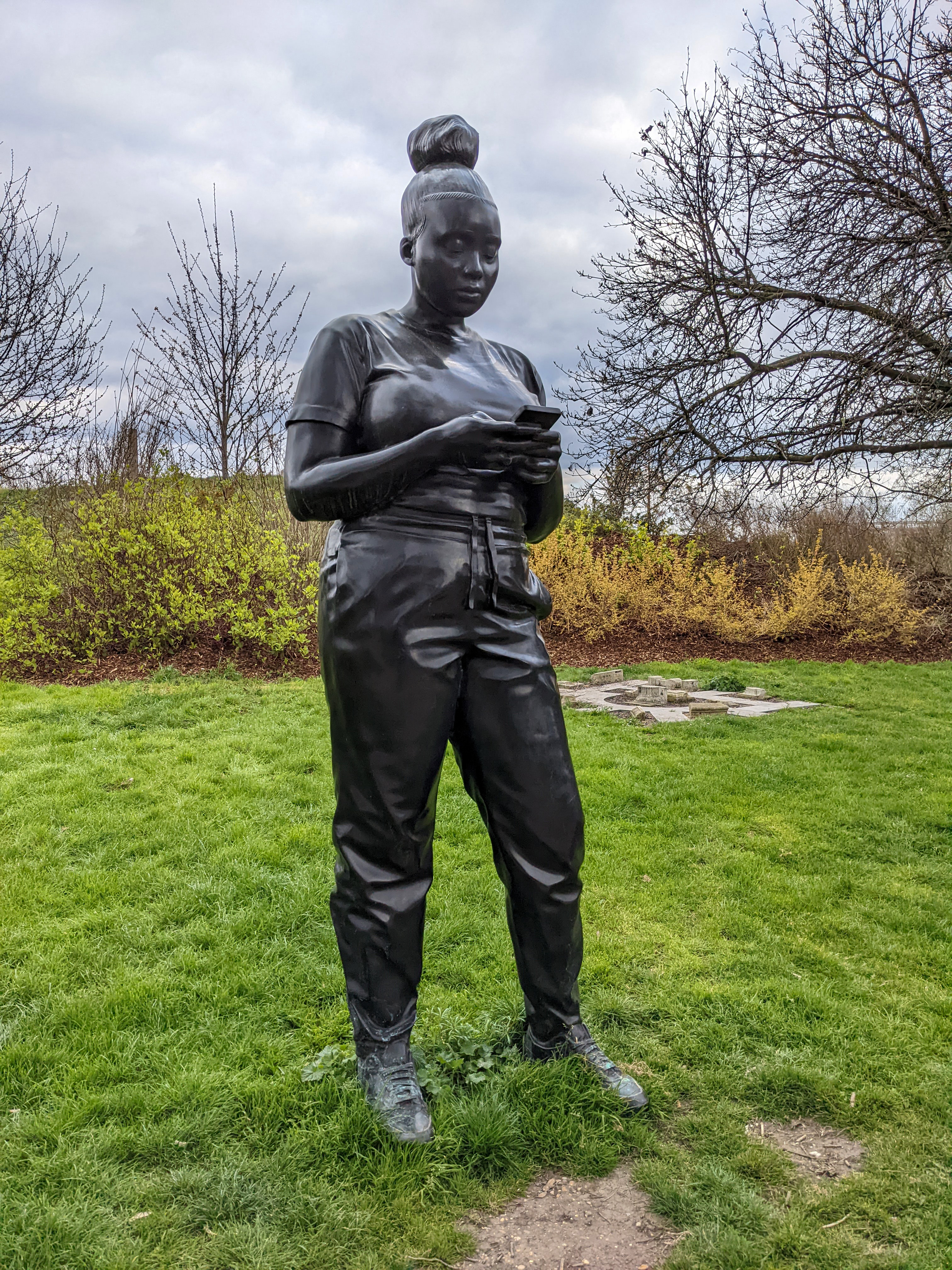
Reaching Out (2020)

Reaching Out is 9 feet (2.7 m) tall and weighs 420 kilograms. "I want this sculpture to be an opportunity for people to connect emotionally with an image of someone they might not have noticed before," Price said.

The sculpture was on Three Mills Green near Stratford, east London. This was the first statue in the UK of a black woman by a black artist. The Guardian reported that there are only two other statues of black women in the UK.

Price wrote in TIME about the legacy of colonial monuments and the removal of the statue of Edward Colston. Within the article, he said, "White artists are putting themselves forward to create replacement sculptures of slave owners with no sense of irony. That's a saviour complex, and that exemplifies what is wrong, when even the solution doesn't involve the Black experience."

=== Moments Contained ===
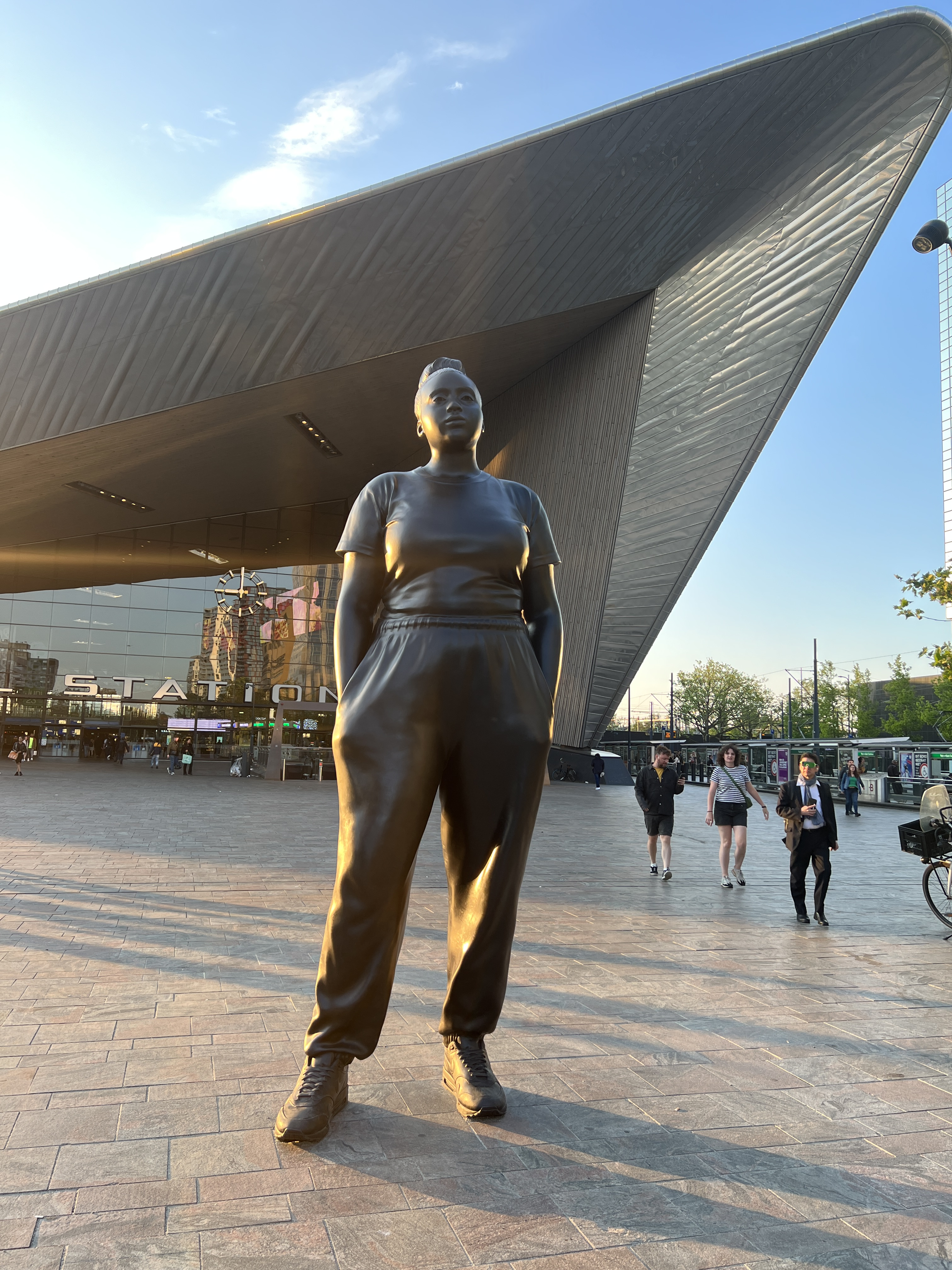
Moments Contained at Rotterdam Centraal station

In 2022, Price returned to the fictional character depicted in Reaching Out with the statue Moments Contained, which was unveiled at the forecourt of Rotterdam Centraal station in the Netherlands. The statue depicts the unnamed young black woman with her hands in her pockets. Price explained, "You can see the knuckles slightly pressing through the fabric. And I think, there's also this sense of containing oneself. And that potential energy that's there. And the emotion or the psychological tension, that's just ready to emerge from this piece." At the unveiling the statue, the former mayor of Rotterdam Ahmed Aboutaleb said he expected it to become the city's most photographed image. "She's not a heroine, a character with an illustrious past. She is the future, our future, and this city is her home."

Not all responses to Moments Contained were positive. Rosanne Hertzberger, writing in NRC, was critical, describing its subject matter as just "someone ordinary" and that "The group to which she belonged was marginalized and therefore she is now overcompensated", and that the statue is "offensive to people who have actually done something heroic". Marjolijn van der Meijden, project leader at Sculpture International Rotterdam, instead said, "This is a statue about softness. It doesn't stand on a plinth and isn't an exalted representation of someone exotic. It's just yourself, how you are, not a 'super' version."

=== Grounded in the Stars ===
Grounded in the Stars was a 12-foot (3.7 m)-tall bronze sculpture temporarily installed in Times Square, New York City, in 2025.

=== Ancient Feelings ===
In September 2025, the 3-metre tall bronze statue was installed outside the Museum of Contemporary Art Australia in Sydney where it remained until April 2026. Commenting on Ancient Feelings, Christopher Allen, national art critic for The Australian newspaper, described Price as "one of those international artists who specialise in producing bland, forgettable and yet pseudo-political works on a very large scale" and described a version of Reaching Out shown in Florence, Time Unfolding, as "triviality".

=== A Place Beyond ===
Price's latest work, A Place Beyond, was installed outside the V&A East in London's Queen Elizabeth Olympic Park ahead of the gallery's opening in April 2026. The Guardian's Catherine Slessor described the 5-metre bronze female statue – Price's tallest – as "a fictionalised young everywoman, mobile phone in hand, scanning the horizon... somehow in perfect synchronicity with O'Donnell & Tuomey's building", while the same newspaper's art critic Ben Eastham called it "the quintessence of east London youth, executed at the scale of Michelangelo's David".

== Gallery ==
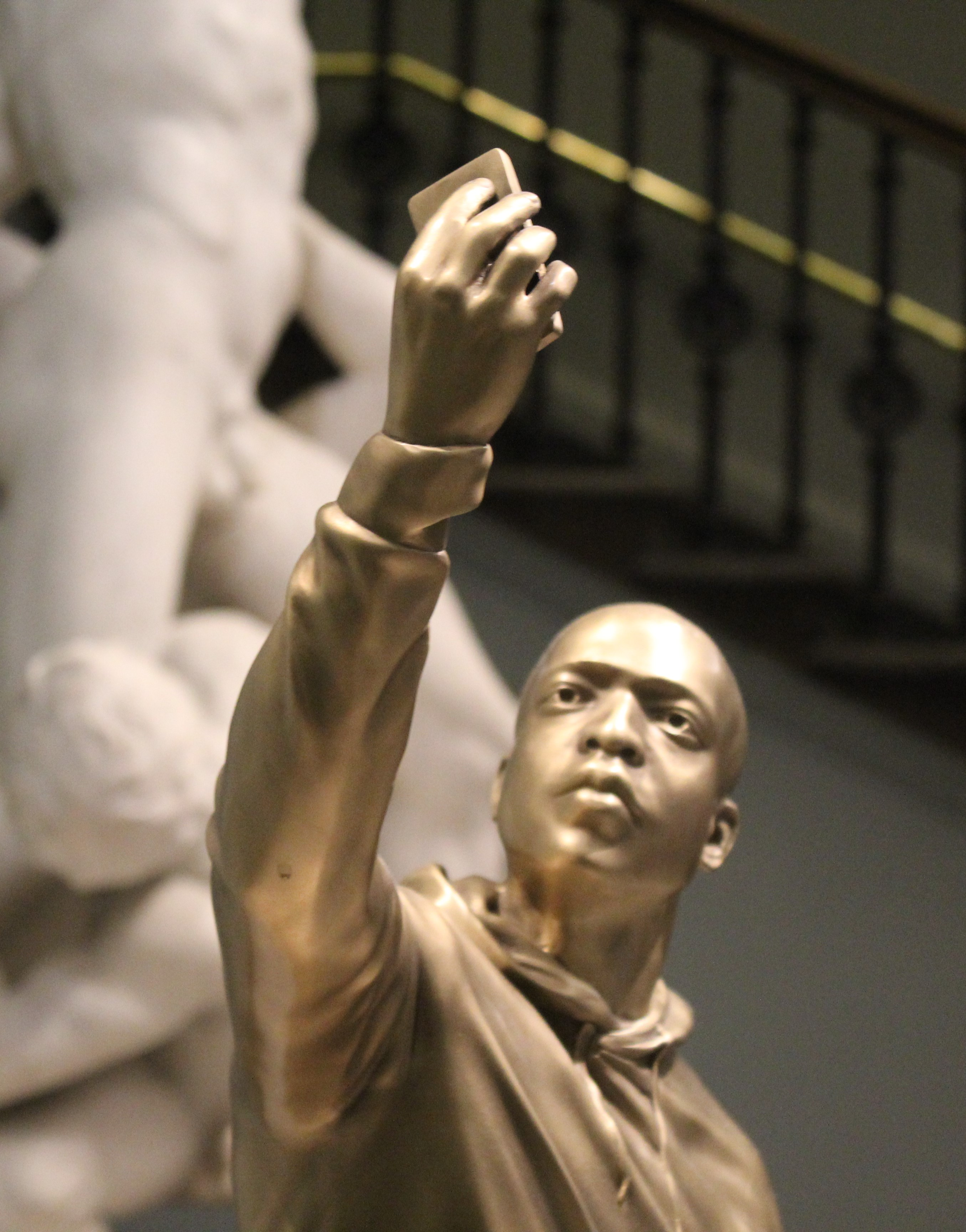
Signals, 2021, Victoria and Albert Museum

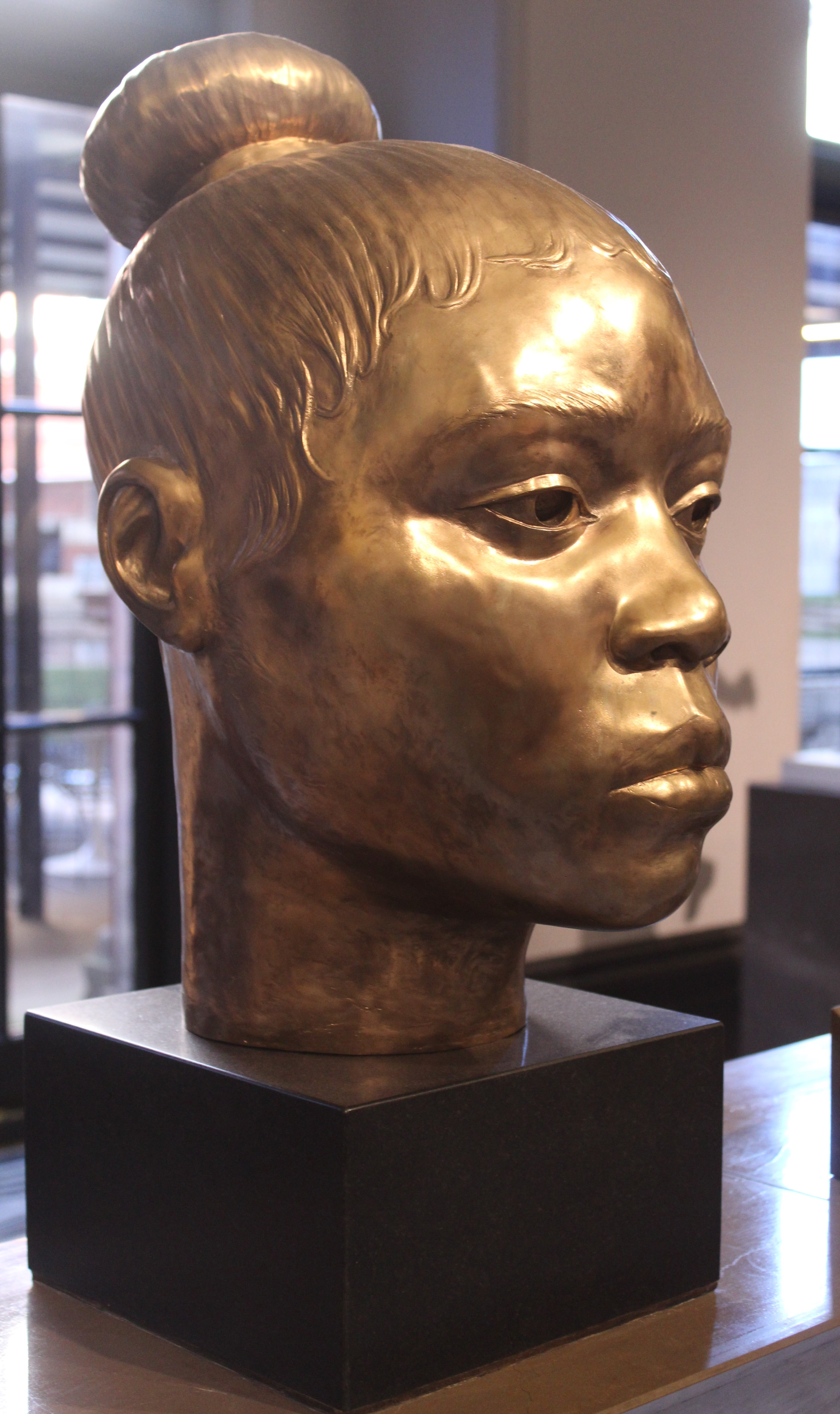
Lay It Down (On The Edge Of Beauty), 2018, Victoria and Albert Museum

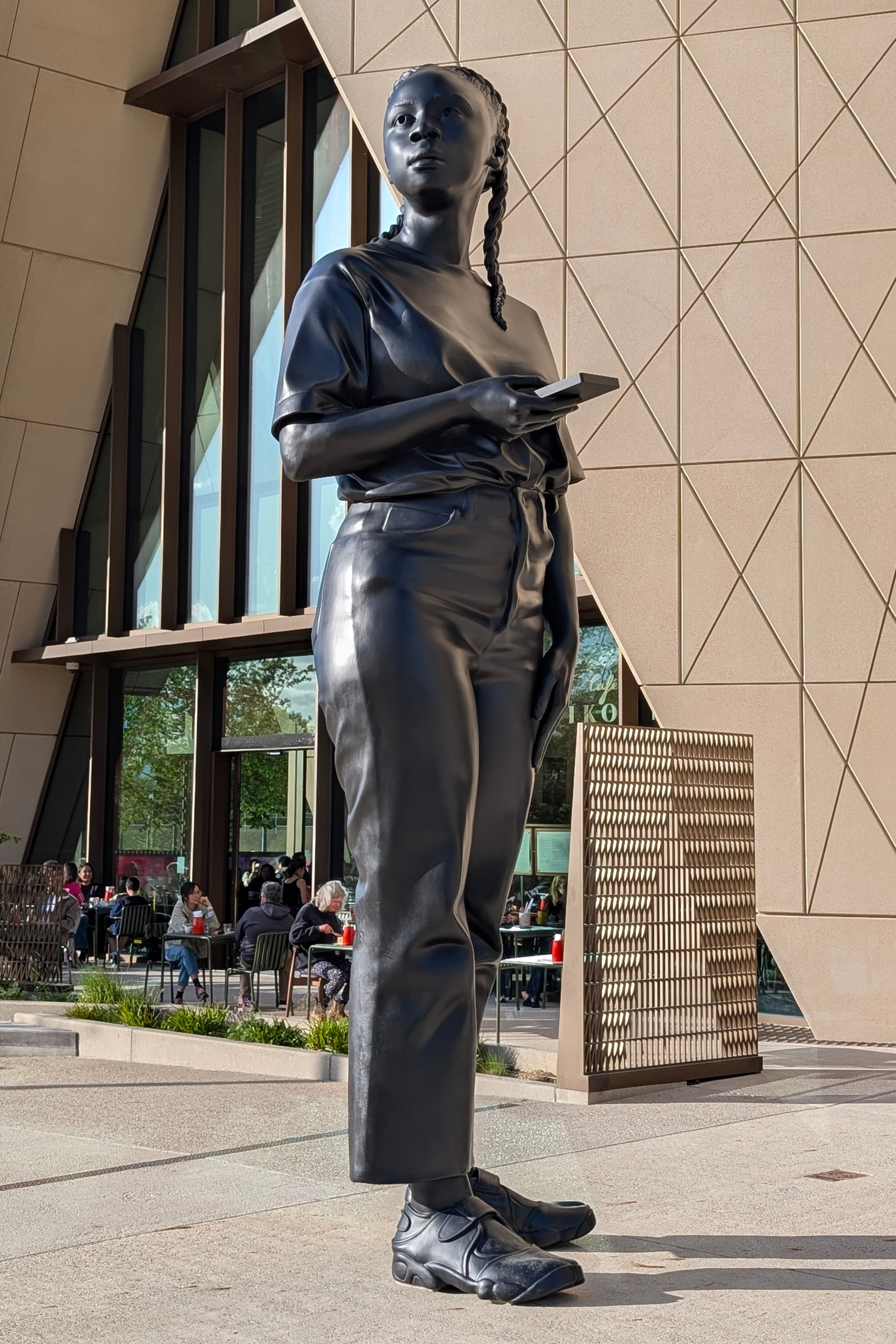
A Place Beyond, 2026

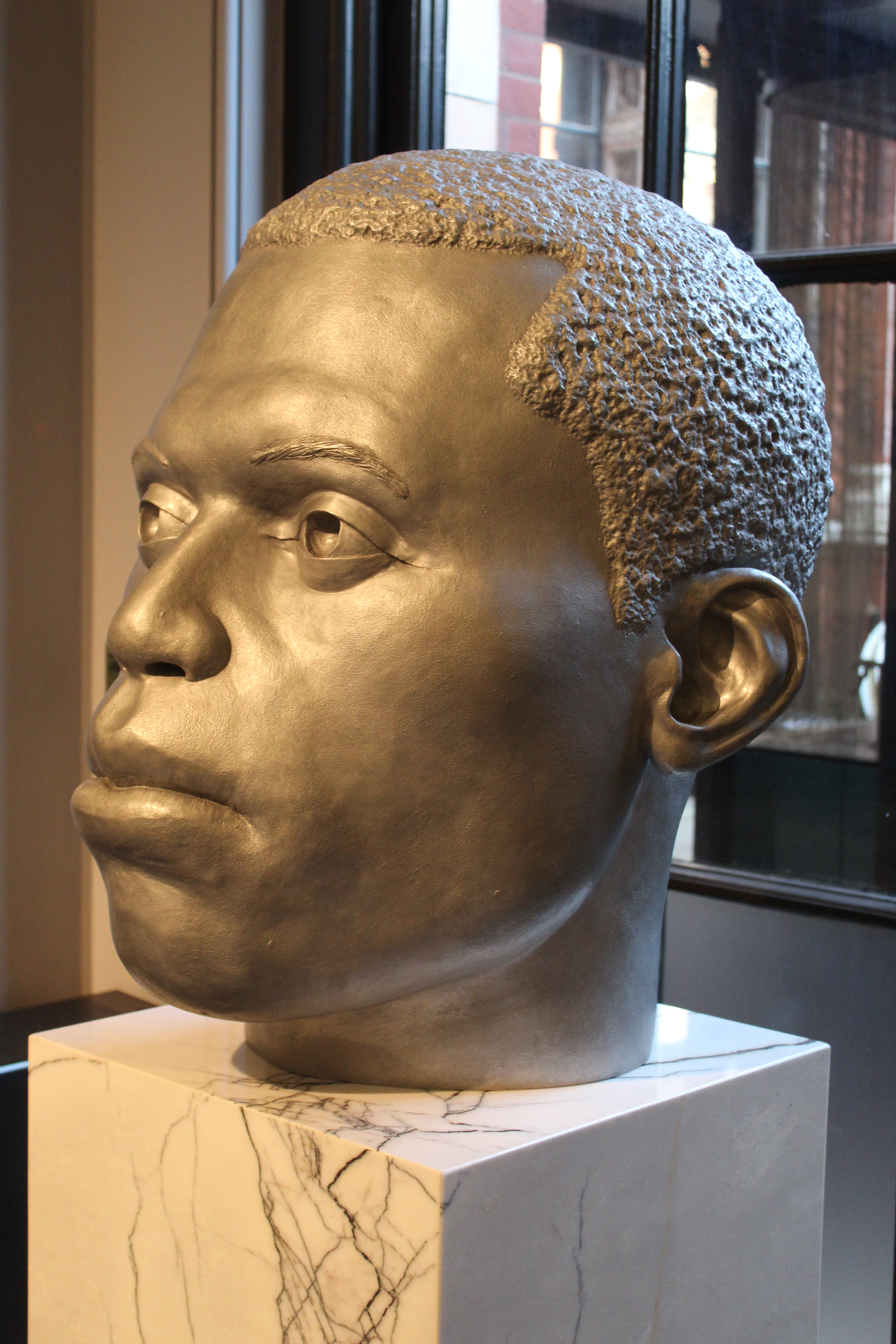
Numen (Shifting Votive One), 2016, Victoria and Albert Museum

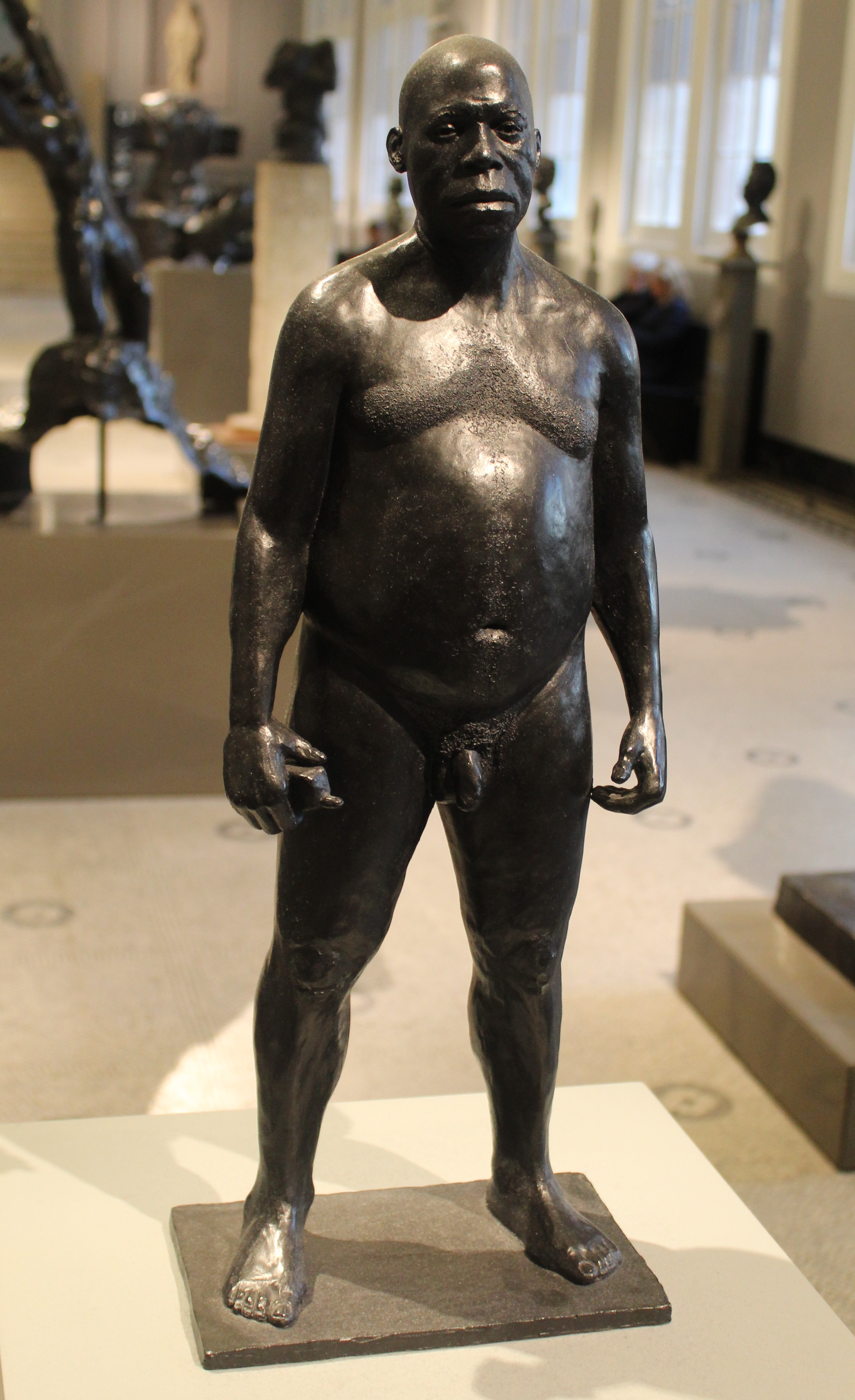
Tasman Road, Figure 2, 2008, Victoria and Albert Museum
