= Reaching Out (sculpture) =

Sculpture by Thomas J Price

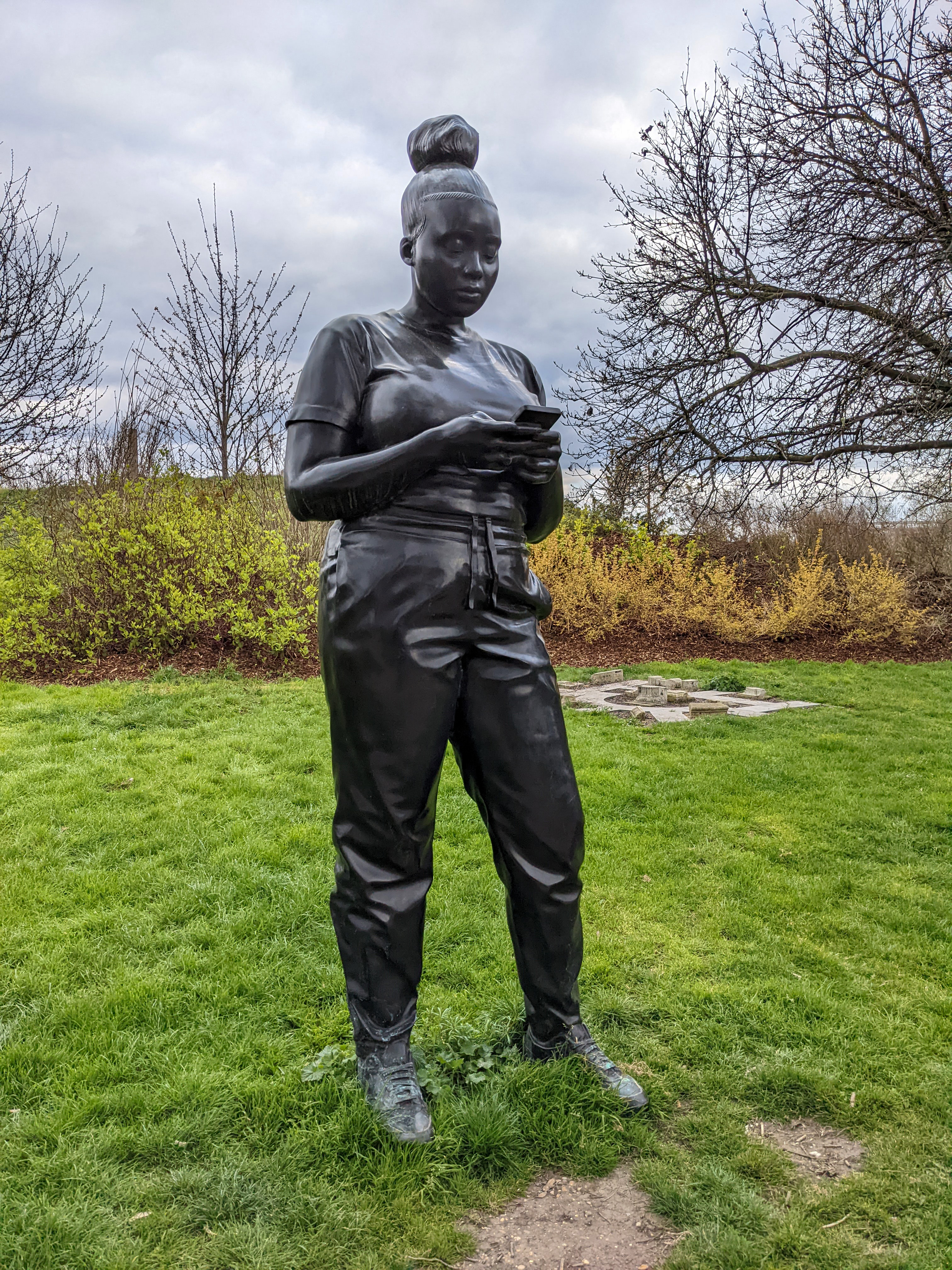
- Reaching Out in 2022 on The Line art trail in London
- Artist: Thomas J Price
- Year: 2020
- Medium: Bronze
- Dimensions: 285 cm × 90 cm (112 in × 35 in); 86 cm diameter (34 in)
- Weight: 420 kilograms (930 lb)

Reaching Out is a bronze sculpture of a Black woman looking at her mobile phone by artist Thomas J Price. She is casually dressed, while seemingly unengaged with her surroundings. It was unveiled in 2020 at The Line art trail in East London during a time when Black Lives Matter protests drew attention to public art celebrating historical figures who had persecuted Black people. It is one of several monumental sculptures by Price depicting Black women and men, a subject matter underrepresented in modern sculpture. Reaching Out was the third public sculpture of a Black woman in London and the first public commissioned sculpture in the United Kingdom of a Black woman created by a Black artist.

Price's goal is to create works depicting "everymen" and "everywomen" that are often overlooked engaging in routine activities. The intent of Reaching Out is to show someone relatable and to represent marginalised voices. It has been described as "decidedly ordinary" while also reframing "the ordinary as extraordinary". The sculpture was on display on the art trail until 2022. Since then, it has been exhibited at other institutions. Replicas are on display at the National Portrait Gallery in London and Ekebergparken Sculpture Park in Oslo.

== Description ==
Reaching Out is a dark bronze sculpture depicting an anonymous Black woman looking at her mobile phone. She is wearing casual pants, a fitted T-shirt and Nike trainers, while casually posing as she focuses on the phone. Her hair is tied into a knot on top of her head, with strands of hair hanging by her face. The sculpture measures 2.85 metres (9 ft 4 in) tall, 0.9 metres (2 ft 11 in) wide and 0.86 metres (2 ft 10 in) in diameter. Unlike many monumental sculptures, the figure does not stand on a plinth or pedestal. It weighs 420 kilograms (930 lb).

The sculpture was originally located on Three Mills Green in East London, one of many public works along The Line art trail. It was removed two years later and has been displayed at other institutions, including the National Gallery of Victoria in Melbourne, the Kunsthal in Rotterdam and the Chillida Leku in Hernani, Spain. Replicas of the sculpture are on display in the National Portrait Gallery in London and Ekebergparken Sculpture Park in Oslo, and have been exhibited at the Hauser & Wirth in Bruton, England.

It was sculpted by British artist Thomas J Price whose works often depict Black "everymen" and "everywomen" engaging in routine activities. One of his goals was to create a sculpture that people can relate to, something many large sculptures fail to do according to Price. He wanted viewers, specifically Black women, to recognize themselves or someone they know in Reaching Out, a person who is often overlooked. Unlike many grand sculptures, the woman is not being depicted as a hero, but as someone relatable.

Price's other works include Network, a 2013 sculpture of a Black man casually looking at his mobile phone, Moments Contained, a 2022 sculpture of a Black woman posing confidently, and A Place Beyond, a 2026 monumental sculpture of a young Black woman holding a mobile phone while looking into the distance. Reaching Out was Price's first solo full-figure sculpture of a woman. It was the city's third public statue of a Black woman, with the first two being the statue of Mary Seacole outside St Thomas' Hospital and the Bronze Woman monument in Stockwell. It was also the first public commissioned statue in the country of a Black woman to be created by a Black artist.

== Analysis and reception ==
According to Price, Reaching Out "is a representation of a fictional young woman, which is important because of the way Black women have often been marginalised in society, without being given the visibility they deserve." It combines the idea of isolation while also being connected to the outside world. Price's works including Reaching Out have been described as "decidedly ordinary" but also reframing "the ordinary as extraordinary" and reflecting his "desire for more accurate and meaningful representations for marginalised voices, including his own." Price has noted he did not see many people like himself while attending art school and seeks to create art that represents a population he believes is underrepresented in modern sculpture. Reaching Out does not look at the viewer, much like his other works, because the person depicted does not seek validation. The sculptor wanted viewers to feel a connection to someone they might otherwise overlook.

Although Reaching Out is similar to classical sculpture, the difference is that it does not depict a famous individual posing in a triumphant way, but someone you might see performing a daily routine. The choice of subject raises "a quiet question about who and what deserves to be eternalized through sculptural monuments." According to Price, "often the most powerful person in the room is the person in the background, or fiddling, or not sitting bolt upright smiling." The subject staring at her phone represents the way technology affects modern life for most individuals, and her casual clothes and shoes further invites viewers to relate to her. A review in Art Papers noted a connection between Reaching Out and the Windrush generation, the Afro-Caribbean people who migrated to the United Kingdom from the late 1940s to early 1970s.

Nora McGreevy from Smithsonian wrote that when Reaching Out was unveiled in 2020 it celebrated "black culture and rejects monumentalism" during the Black Lives Matter protests, a time when statues of people associated with the persecution of Black people were being criticised or removed. A few months before Reaching Out was unveiled in August 2020, London Mayor Sadiq Khan said a commission would be formed to "review and improve diversity" amongst public art in the city. The Line director Megan Piper said, "The lack of diversity in the public realm is under long-overdue scrutiny and this installation—as a portrait of a contemporary black woman, rather than a sculpture depicting a historically celebrated (white male) figure—feels particularly pertinent."
