= Thomson & Craighead =

British artist duo

Jon Thomson (born 1969) and Alison Craighead (born 1971) are London-based visual artists, who work with video, sound and the internet.

== Life and work ==
Jon Thomson was born in London, England and Alison Craighead in Aberdeen, Scotland.

They have been working together with video, sound and the internet since 1993. Much of their work to date explores how technology changes the way we perceive the world around us. They use live data to make artworks, including "template cinema online artworks" and gallery installations, where networked movies are created in real time from online material such as remote-user security web cams, audio feeds and chat room text transcripts.

Recently (as of 2008) they have made outdoor semi-permanent works, Decorative Newsfeeds and BEACON, where the emphasis is on live virtual information. In BEACON, data is projected onto gallery walls, interacting with viewers' physical space. In 2007 they made an animated documentary, Flat Earth, where the voices of bloggers found online are combined with public domain satellite imagery.

In 2005 they won Arts Foundation award, and were fellows at the MacDowell Colony, New Hampshire in Autumn 2004.

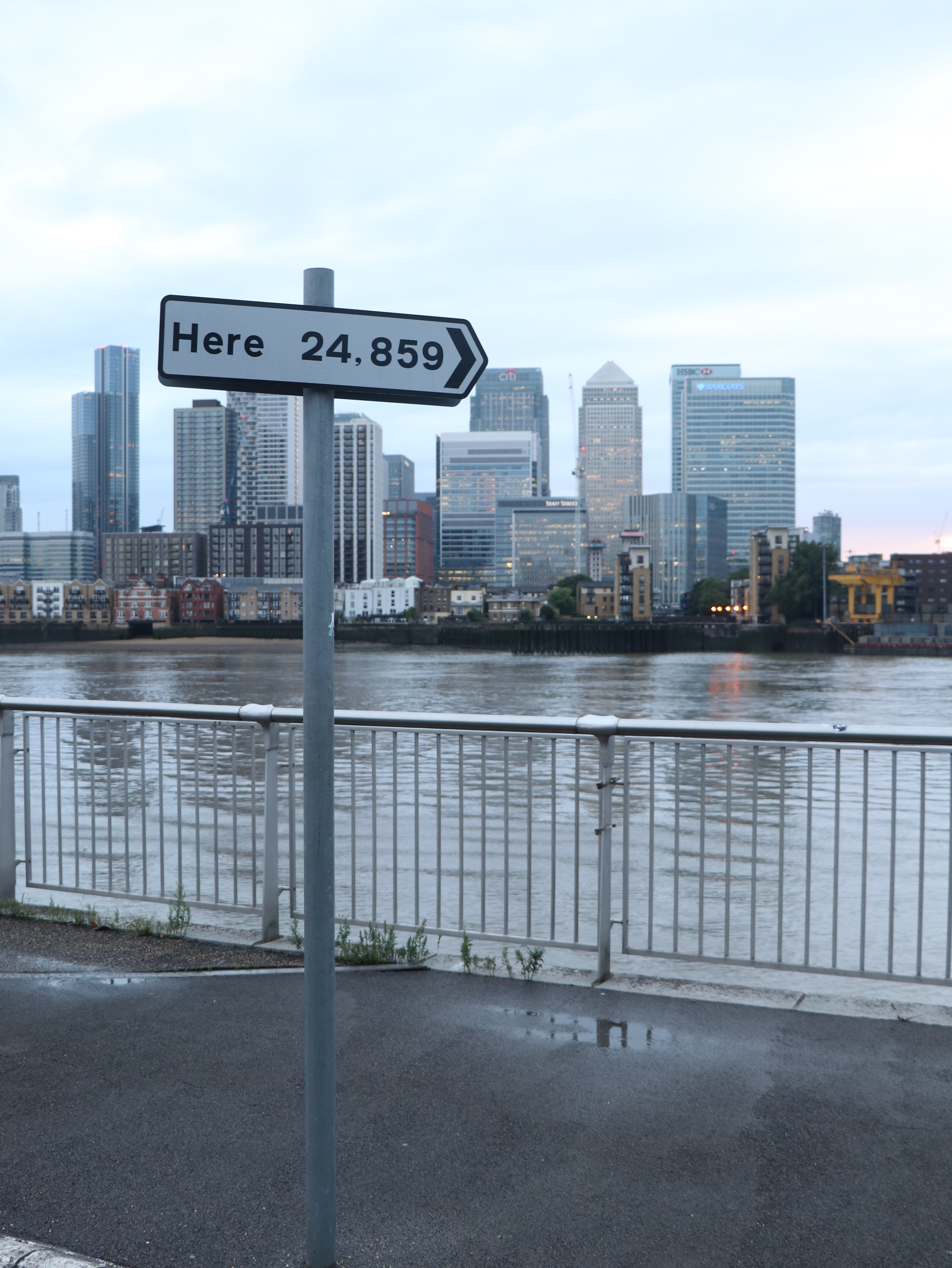
"Here", viewed from east, with Canary Wharf district in background

Created by Thomson & Craighead, Here is a 2013 artwork formed by a standard 2.64m tall UK road sign pointing north from a riverside path in east London and displaying the 24,859 mile distance around the circumference of the earth back to the sign's position. Maggie Gray in art magazine Apollo said: "Such pieces command attention and, once they have it, direct that attention outwards to their surroundings, or back on to the viewer." In 2014, it was one of nine works chosen from over 70 submissions for The Line, an art project distributed along a three-mile route following some of London's waterways between Stratford and North Greenwich. The route opened in 2015.

Thomson is Professor of Fine Art at the Slade School of Fine Art in London. Craighead is currently Reader at the University of Westminster, and also lectures in Fine Art at Goldsmiths, University of London.

== Exhibitions ==
Exhibitions include 'Maps DNA and Spam' at Dundee Contemporary Arts; Never Odd nor even at Carroll / Fletcher Gallery London; Tate Britain; San Francisco Museum of Modern Art SFMOMA; Laboral Art Centre in Gijon, Spain; Zentrum Kunst Media ZKM, Karlsruhe, Germany; The New Museum, New York; Mejanlabs, Stockholm; Neuberger Museum of Art at Purchase, New York.
