= Sharon Jones & the Dap-Kings discography =

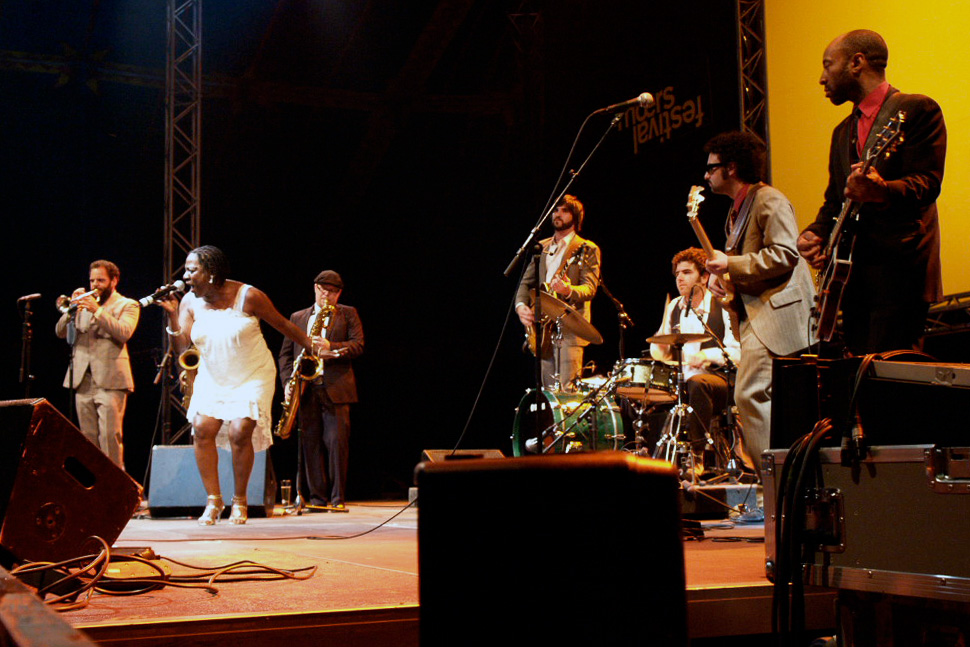
- The band performing live in 2007.
- Studio albums: 7
- Soundtrack albums: 1
- Compilation albums: 3
- Singles: 31

The discography of Sharon Jones & the Dap Kings consists of seven studio albums, three compilation albums, and the soundtrack album of Miss Sharon Jones!, in addition to more than thirty album and non-album singles. Not included in these numbers are the singles released by the band in the late 1990s as the Soul Providers.

== Albums ==
=== Studio albums ===
Title	Details
Dap Dippin'	Released: May 14, 2002; Label: Daptone; Format: LP, CD, digital
Naturally	Released: January 25, 2005; Label: Daptone; Format: LP, CD, digital
100 Days, 100 Nights	Released: October 2, 2007; Label: Daptone; Format: LP, CD, digital
I Learned the Hard Way	Released: April 6, 2010; Label: Daptone; Format: LP, CD, digital
Give the People What They Want	Released: January 14, 2014; Label: Daptone; Format: LP, CD, digital
It's a Holiday Soul Party	Released: October 30, 2015; Label: Daptone; Format: LP, CD, digital
Soul of a Woman	Released: November 17, 2017; Label: Daptone; Format: LP, CD, digital

=== Compilation albums ===
Title	Details
The Dynamic Sound of Sharon Jones and the Dap-Kings	'Best of' collection; Released: April 16, 2009; Label: Daptone; Format: CD
Soul Time!	Collection of non-album funk tracks; Released: November 14, 2011; Label: Daptone; Format: LP, CD, digital
Miss Sharon Jones!	Soundtrack collection; Released: August 19, 2016; Label: Daptone; Format: LP, CD, digital
Just Dropped In (To See What Condition My Rendition Was In)	Collection of cover songs recorded from 2002 on; Released: October 23, 2020; Label: Daptone; Format: LP, CD, digital

== Singles ==
Adapted from the Daptone catalog.

=== As primary artist ===
Title (A-side / B-side)	Year	Album	Format	Cat.
"Got a Thing On My Mind" Part 1 & 2	2001	Dap Dippin'	45	DAP-1001
"Make It Good To Me" / "Casella Walk" (The Dap-Kings feat. Bosco Mann)	2002	Dap Dippin'	45	DAP-1004
"Got To Be The Way It Is" Part 1 & 2	2002	Dap Dippin'	45	DAP-1006
"What Have You Done For Me Lately"	2002	Dap Dippin'	45	DAP-1009
"Pick It Up Lay It In The Cut" / "Hard Eight" (The Dap-Kings feat. Otis Youngblood)	2002	Dap Dippin'	45	DAP-1011
"Genuine Part" 1 & 2	2004	Non-album singles	45	DAP-1016
"What If We All Stopped Paying Taxes" / "This Land Is Your Land"	2004	Non-album singles	45	DAP-1019
"How Long Do I Have To Wait" / Instrumental	2004	Naturally	45	DAP-1020
"Just Dropped In To See What Condition" / Instrumental	2004	Non-album single	45	DAP-1022
"How Do I Let A Good Man Down" / "My Man Is A Mean Man"	2005	Naturally	45	DAP-1024
"I'm Not Gonna Cry" / "Money Don't Make The Man"	2007	Non-album single	45	DAP-1031
"100 Days, 100 Nights" / "Settling In"	2007	100 Days, 100 Nights	45	DAP-1037
"Tell Me" (stereo) / "Tell Me" (mono mix)	2008	100 Days, 100 Nights	45	DAP-1038
"Ain't No Chimneys In The Projects" / "Holiday Message" (Binky Griptite)	2009	Non-album singles	45, digital	DAP-1048
"When I Come Home" / Instrumental	2010	Non-album singles	45	DAP-1049
"Day Tripper" (The Budos Band) / "Money"	2010	Non-album singles	45	DAP-1053
"Better Things" / "Window Shopping"	2010	I Learned the Hard Way	45	DAP-1053
"He Said I Can" / "It Hurts To Be Alone"	2011	Non-album single	45	DAP-1061
"People Don't Get What They Deserve" / "Slow Down, Love"	2013	Give the People What They Want	45	DAP-1072
"Goldfinger"	2013	Non-album singles	digital	
"Calamity" / "Ain't Nobody"	2014	Non-album singles	45	DAP-1078
"Just Another Christmas Song" / "Big Bulbs"	2014	It's a Holiday Soul Party	45	DAP-1086
"Little Boys With Shiny Toys" / Instrumental	2015	Non-album single	45, digital	DAP-1089
"8 Days Of Hanukah" / "What Does Hanukah Mean"	2015	It's a Holiday Soul Party	45	DAP-1093
"Midnight Rider"	2016	Non-album single	digital	
"Matter Of Time" / "When I Saw Your Face"	2017	Soul of a Woman	45	DAP-1110
"Tear It Down"	2018	Non-album singles	digital	
"Keep On Looking" / "N.B.L." (The Dap-Kings)	2020	Non-album singles	45	DAP-1129
"Little by Little" / "Signed, Sealed Delivered I'm Yours"	2020	Just Dropped In...	digital	
"In the Bush"	2020	Just Dropped In...	digital	
"Making Up And Breaking Up..." / "Just Give Me Your Time"	2021	Non-album single	45	NOR451006
"Don't Wanna Lose You" / "Don't Give A Friend A Number"	2024	Non-album single	45, digital	DAP-1143

=== As remixed artist ===
Title (A-side / B-side)	Year	Remix artist	Format	Cat.
"How Long Do I Have To Wait For You" / "How Long DUB"	2008	Ticklah	45	DAP-1040
"Keep On Looking" (Kenny Dope Remix) / Original version	2008	Kenny Dope	12"	SPR-12001

=== Collections ===
- I Learned The Hard Way – 45s Box Set
- Dappy Holidays – 45s Box Set

== Guest appearances ==
Title	Year	Other artist(s)	Album
"6 O'Clock Blues" (sampled artist)	2008	Solange	Sol-Angel And The Hadley St. Dreams
"Baby (You've Got What It Takes)" feat. Sharon Jones & the Dap-Kings	2009	Michael Bublé	Crazy Love
"Take Me with U"	2009	N/A	Purplish Rain
"Inspiration Information"	2009	N/A	Dark Was The Night
"This Land" (sampled artist)	2019	Gary Clark Jr.	This Land

== Soundtrack appearances ==
- Good Luck Chuck (Motion Picture Soundtrack) (2007) – "You're Gonna Get It"
- Soul Men (Original Motion Picture Soundtrack) (2008) – "Just Dropped In (To See What Condition My Condition Was In)"
- Up In The Air (Music From The Motion Picture) (2009) – "This Land Is Your Land"
- Hung: Original Television Soundtrack (2010) – "How Long Do I Have to Wait for You?"
- For Colored Girls: Music From and Inspired by the Original Motion Picture Soundtrack (2010) – "Longer & Stronger"
- Stand Up Guys (Original Motion Picture Soundtrack) (2012) – "Give It Back"
- The Wolf Of Wall Street: Music From The Motion Picture (2013) – "Goldfinger"
- Maron (Music From The Original Television Series) (2013) – "Give Me A Chance"
- Luke Cage OST (2016) – "100 Day, 100 Nights"

== Dap-Kings credits ==
=== Singles ===
Adapted from the Daptone catalog.

Title (A-side / B-side)	Year	Other artist(s)	Format	Cat.
"Give Me A Chance"	2001	Lee Fields	45	DAP-1002
"Nervous Like Me" / Instrumental	2004		45, digital	KD-003
"I'm In Love"	2011	Ricky Calloway	45, digital	FNR-011/KD-030
"Stay In The Groove"	2011	Ricky Calloway	45, digital	FNR-015/KD-09
"I'm In Love (Instrumental)"	2012	Ricky Calloway	45, digital	FNR-021
"Stay In The Groove (Instrumental)"	2012	Ricky Calloway	45, digital	FNR-025
"Stay In The Groove (Kenny Dope Mixes)"	2012	Ricky Calloway	45, digital	FNR-029
"Tear It Down" / "The Collection Song"	2018		45	DAP-1116

=== Guest appearances ===
Title	Year	Other artist(s)	Album
"Red Hot"	2005	Jurassic 5	Non-album single
"Rehab"	2006	Amy Winehouse	Back to Black
"You Know I'm No Good"	2006	Amy Winehouse	Back to Black
"Back to Black"	2006	Amy Winehouse	Back to Black
"Love Is A Losing Game"	2006	Amy Winehouse	Back to Black
"Wake Up Alone"	2006	Amy Winehouse	Back to Black
"He Can Only Hold Her"	2006	Amy Winehouse	Back to Black
"God Put a Smile upon Your Face" (featuring The Daptone Horns)	2007	Mark Ronson	Version
"Oh My God" (featuring Lily Allen)	2007	Mark Ronson	Version
"Toxic" (featuring Ol' Dirty Bastard and Tiggers)	2007	Mark Ronson	Version
"Valerie" (featuring Amy Winehouse)	2007	Mark Ronson	Version
"Apply Some Pressure" (featuringPaul Smith)	2007	Mark Ronson	Version
"Inversion"	2007	Mark Ronson	Version
"Pretty Green" (featuring Santigold)	2007	Mark Ronson	Version
"Just" (featuring Phantom Planet)	2007	Mark Ronson	Version
"Amy" (featuring Kenna)	2007	Mark Ronson	Version
"The Only One I Know" (featuring Robbie Williams)	2007	Mark Ronson	Version
"Diversion"	2007	Mark Ronson	Version
"L.S.F. (Lost Souls Forever)" (featuring Kasabian)	2007	Mark Ronson	Version
"Outversion"	2007	Mark Ronson	Version
"So Good Today"	2007	Ben Westbeech	Non-album single
"Colleen" feat. The Dap-King Horns	2007	The Heavy	Great Vengeance and Furious Fire
"Fried Chicken"	2007	Nas	Nas
"Cash In My Pocket"	2008	Wiley	See Clear Now
"Patches"	2009	The Saturday Knights	Mingle
"Mama Told Me"	2009	Wale	Attention Deficit
"Impossible"	2009	Daniel Merriweather	Love & War
"Change"	2009	Daniel Merriweather	Love & War
"Chainsaw"	2009	Daniel Merriweather	Love & War
"Cigarettes"	2009	Daniel Merriweather	Love & War
"Could You"	2009	Daniel Merriweather	Love & War
"Not Giving Up"	2009	Daniel Merriweather	Love & War
"Getting Out"	2009	Daniel Merriweather	Love & War
"Live By Night"	2009	Daniel Merriweather	Love & War
"How Do You Like Me Now" (featuring The Dap-King Horns)	2010	The Heavy	How Do You Like Me Now EP
"Will You Still Love Me Tomorrow? (2011)"	2011	Amy Winehouse	Lioness: Hidden Treasures
"Valerie ('68 Version)"	2011	Amy Winehouse	Lioness: Hidden Treasures
"The One Who Broke Your Heart"	2012	David Byrne & St. Vincent	Love This Giant
"A La Modeliste" (Original Mix)	2012	Mark Ronson, et al.,	RE:Generation (The Remixes)
"A La Modeliste" (Bonobo Remix)	2012	Mark Ronson, et al.,	RE:Generation (The Remixes)
"Like a Rock"	2014	Jennifer Nettles	That Girl
"Heart Of Stone"	2015	Mario Biondi	Beyond Special Edition
"Look Closer (Can't You See The Signs?)"	2015	Saun & Starr	Non-album single
"Welcome To Earth (Pollywog)"	2016	Sturgill Simpson	A Sailor's Guide to Earth
"Keep It Between The Lines"	2016	Sturgill Simpson	A Sailor's Guide to Earth
"In Bloom"	2016	Sturgill Simpson	A Sailor's Guide to Earth
"All Around You"	2016	Sturgill Simpson	A Sailor's Guide to Earth
"Call To Arms"	2016	Sturgill Simpson	A Sailor's Guide to Earth
"Stone Cool"	2016	Michael Lington	Second Nature
"Slick"	2016	Michael Lington	Second Nature
"You're My Present" (featuring The Dap-Kings)	2017	Smokey Robinson	Christmas Everyday
"Woman" (featuring The Dap-Kings Horns)	2017	Kesha	Rainbow
"Who Do You Love"	2018	Elise Legrow	Playing Chess
"Hold On"	2018	Elise Legrow	Playing Chess
"Going Back Where I Belong"	2018	Elise Legrow	Playing Chess
"Rescue Me"	2018	Elise Legrow	Playing Chess
"Can't Shake It"	2018	Elise Legrow	Playing Chess
"How Did You Get Here"	2019	Celine Dion	Courage
"Black Heart"	2019	Stealth	Non-album singles
"This Christmas"	2020	Jess Glynne	Non-album singles
