= Binky Griptite =

American musician and DJ

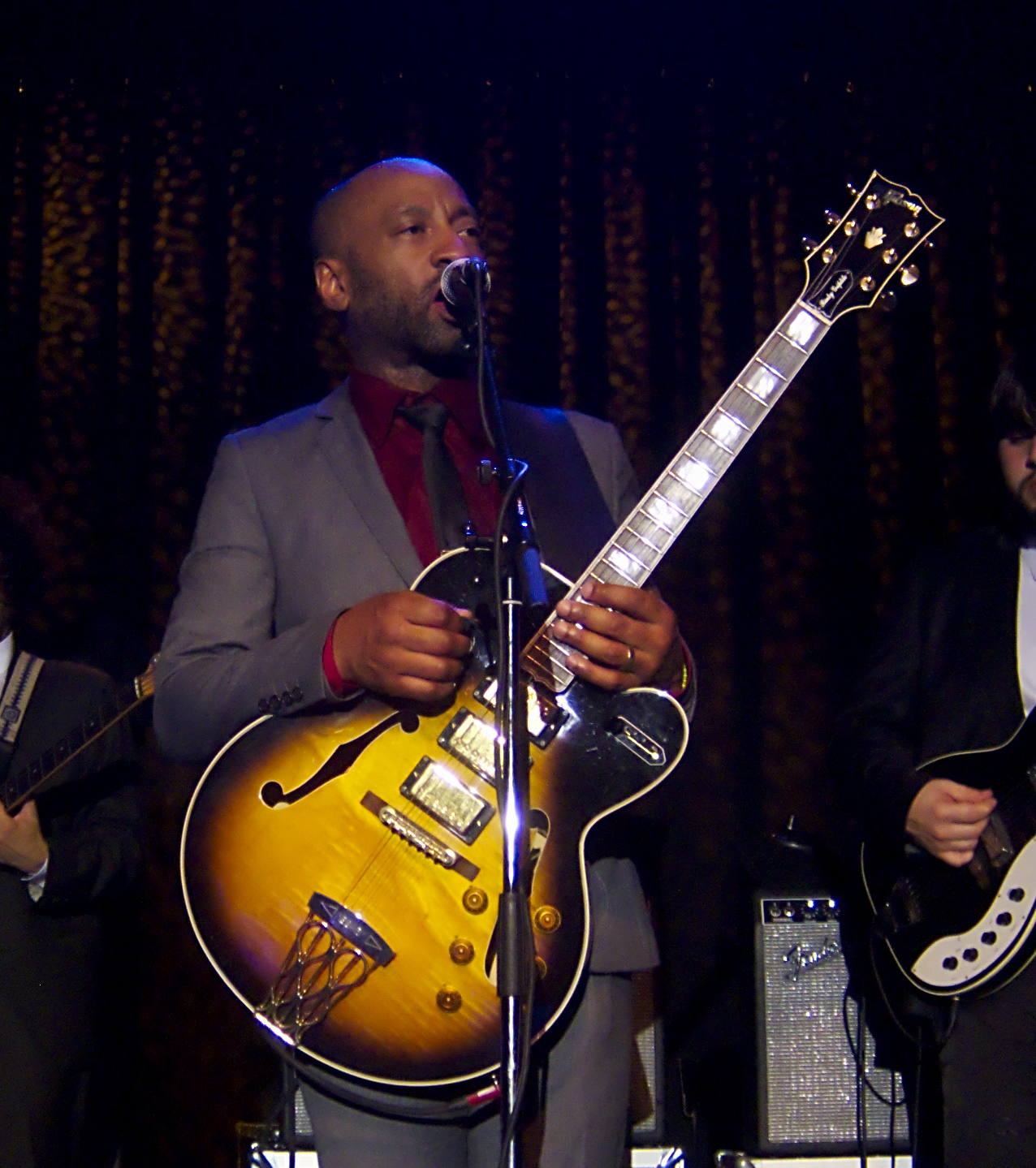
- Griptite with the Dap-Kings in 2012.

Background information
- Born: Franklin Stribling; Milwaukee, Wisconsin
- Origin: New York City
- Genres: Soul; funk; retro-soul; R&B
- Occupations: Musician; producer; DJ
- Instrument: Guitar
- Years active: 1996–present
- Label: Daptone Records
- Presenting career
- Show: The Boogie Down
- Station: WFUV
- Time slot: Saturday, 8-11 pm
- Website: wfuv.org/content/boogie-down

Franklin Stribling, professionally known as Binky Griptite, is an American guitarist, record producer, and radio DJ. He is best known as a founding member and guitarist of Sharon Jones & the Dap-Kings, Soul Providers, and Antibalas, among other Daptone Records-related projects. From 2017 to 2021, he hosted the weekly radio program The Boogie Down on WFUV.

== Childhood ==
Griptite was born (1966) and raised in Milwaukee, the youngest of 7 children. He lived in Minneapolis before moving to New York City in 1996.

== Career ==
Following a break in his music career he connected with musician Gabe Roth, who would co-found Daptone Records, and was recruited to play in Roth's Desco Records house band, Soul Providers. Some of the first records he played on were those of Lee Fields. He adopted the stage name Binky Griptite in 1999.

In late 1998, he joined the first incarnation of the Brooklyn afrobeat ensemble Antibalas with then-roommate Martín Perna as a bassist, touring and recording with them in their early years. Following the dissolution of Desco and the Soul Providers in 1999–2000, he formed The Dap-Kings with other former members as a band for Sharon Jones. They recorded their debut album Dap Dippin' with Sharon Jones and the Dap-Kings in 2001. In total, the group released eight studio albums, concluding with 2017's Soul of a Woman. Their 2014 album Give the People What They Want was nominated for the Grammy Award for Best R&B Album. Following a twenty-year tenure, Griptite departed from The Dap-Kings in September 2018.

In addition to playing with the Dap-Kings, Binky has played on records for artists such as Janet Jackson and Amy Winehouse, with whom he toured extensively in 2007. As a producer, he has worked with artists such as The Impressions. He also leads the R&B band The Mellomatics and The Binky Griptite Orchestra.

In July 2017, Griptite began hosting The Boogie Down on WFUV. The all-vinyl radio show airs weekly on Saturday nights and highlights vintage soul and R&B tracks.

In July 2021, WFUV announced that Griptite and the station have amicably agreed to end the program, saying that Griptite hopes to revive the program at some future point, on a station or stations to be determined.

== Discography ==
Selected album discography. Adapted from Discogs.

- Sharon Jones & the Dap-Kings – Dap Dippin' with Sharon Jones and the Dap-Kings (2002)
- Sharon Jones & the Dap-Kings – Naturally (2005)
- Amy Winehouse – Back to Black (2006); 6 tracks, including "Back to Black" and "Rehab"
- Sharon Jones & the Dap-Kings – 100 Days, 100 Nights (2007)
- Mark Ronson – Version (2007); 2 tracks including "Valerie"
- Daniel Merriweather – Love & War (2009)
- Sharon Jones & the Dap-Kings – I Learned the Hard Way (2010)
- Amy Winehouse – Lioness: Hidden Treasures (2011); 2 tracks
- Sharon Jones & the Dap-Kings – Give the People What They Want (2014)
- Sharon Jones & the Dap-Kings – It's a Holiday Soul Party (2015)
- Saun & Starr – Look Closer (2015)
- Sharon Jones & the Dap-Kings – Soul of a Woman (2017)
- Deva Mahal – Run Deep (2018); 2 tracks
- Nicole Atkins – Italian Ice (2020)
- Sharon Jones & The Dap-Kings – Just Dropped In (To See What Condition My Rendition Was In) (2020)
