= Miss Sharon Jones! =

- Directed by: Barbara Kopple
- Produced by: David Cassidy
- Cinematography: Gary Griffin; Tony Hardmon; Kyle Kibbe
- Edited by: Anne Fratto; Jean Tsien
- Music by: Sharon Jones & The Dap-Kings
- Production company: Cabin Creek Films
- Distributed by: Starz Digital Media
- Release dates: 11 September 2015 (Toronto); 29 July 2016 (limited)
- Running time: 93 minutes
- Language: English

Miss Sharon Jones! is a 2015 documentary film about the singer Sharon Jones. The film depicts Jones' battle with cancer while continuing to perform with her group the Dap-Kings.

== Reception ==
Miss Sharon Jones! has received mostly positive reviews from critics. Review aggregator Rotten Tomatoes gives the film an approval rating of 87%, based on 38 reviews, with an average rating of 7.3/10. On Metacritic, the film has a score of 77 out of 100, based on 15 critics, indicating "generally favorable reviews".

== Soundtrack ==
Miss Sharon Jones!

Soundtrack album by Sharon Jones & the Dap-Kings
- Released: August 19, 2016
- Genres: Soul, funk
- Label: Daptone

Sharon Jones & the Dap-Kings chronology
It's a Holiday Soul Party (2015)	Miss Sharon Jones! (2016)	Soul of a Woman (2017)

The soundtrack to the film was released by Daptone on August 19, 2016. The album compiles songs from the three previous studio albums by Sharon Jones & the Dap-Kings: 100 Days, 100 Nights (2007), I Learned the Hard Way (2010), and Give the People What They Want (2014).

=== Track listing ===
1. Tell Me
2. Retreat!
3. Genuine Pt. 1
4. Longer and Stronger
5. If You Call
6. 100 Days, 100 Nights
7. People Don't Get What They Deserve
8. Humble Me
9. I'll Still Be True
10. Let Them Knock
11. Stranger to My Happiness
12. Keep on Looking
13. Mama Don't Like My Man
14. I Learned the Hard Way
15. Slow Down, Love
16. I'm Still Here
