= Sharon Jones =

American soul and funk singer (1956–2016)

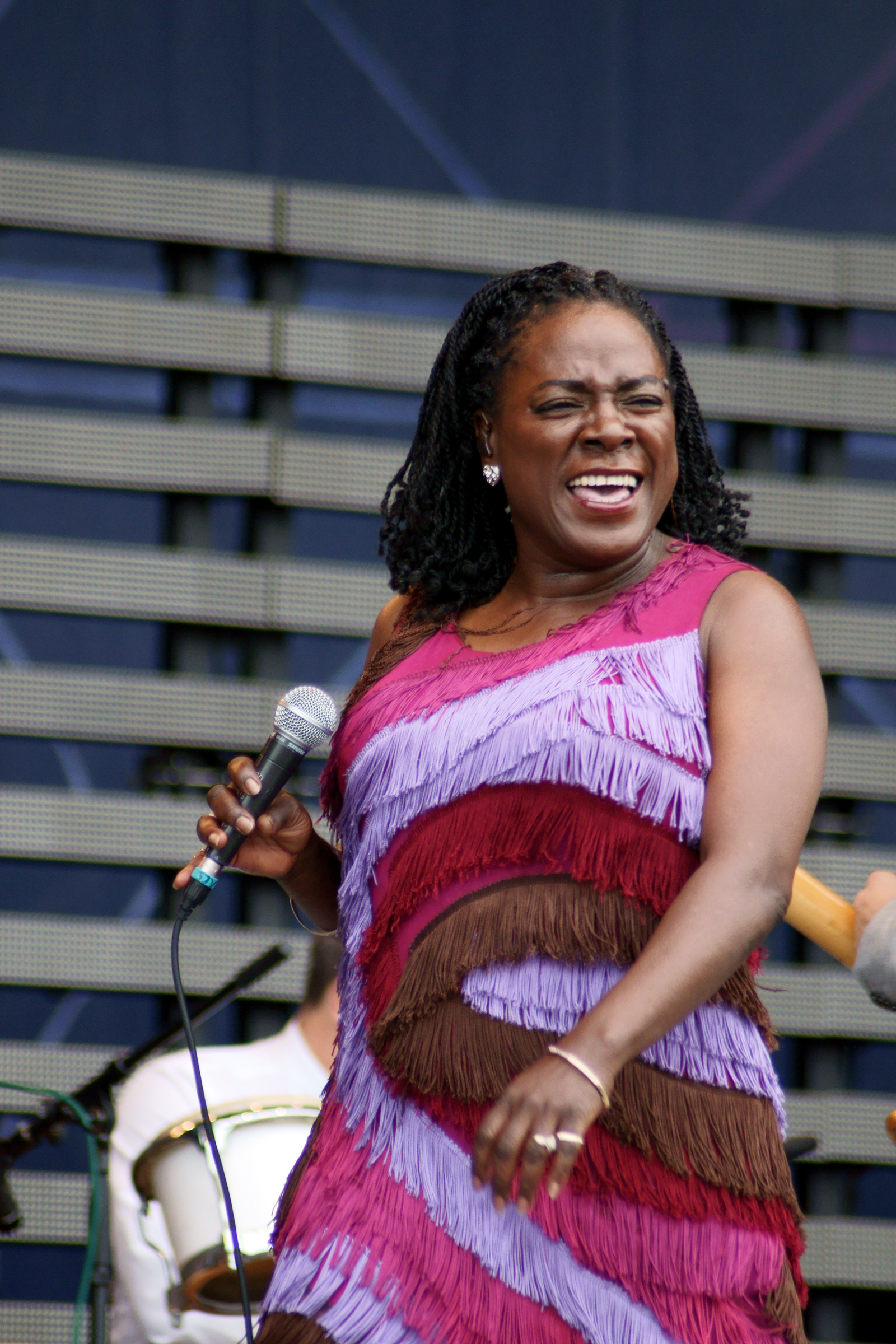
- Jones performing at Pori Jazz in 2010

Background information
- Also known as: Lafaye Jones
- Born: Sharon Lafaye Jones; May 4, 1956; Augusta, Georgia, U.S.
- Origin: New York City, U.S.
- Died: November 18, 2016 (aged 60) Cooperstown, New York, U.S.
- Genres: Soul; retro-soul; R&B; funk
- Occupation: Singer
- Instrument: Vocals
- Years active: 1996–2016
- Labels: Desco, Daptone
- Formerly of: Sharon Jones & the Dap-Kings
- Website: Official website

Sharon Lafaye Jones (May 4, 1956 – November 18, 2016) was an American soul and funk singer. She was the lead singer of Sharon Jones & The Dap-Kings, a soul and funk band based in Brooklyn, New York. Jones experienced breakthrough success relatively late in life, releasing her first record when she was 40 years old. In 2014, Jones was nominated for her first Grammy, in the category Best R&B Album, for Give the People What They Want.

== Early life ==
Jones was born in Augusta, Georgia, the daughter of Ella Mae Price Jones and Charlie Jones, living in adjacent North Augusta, South Carolina. Jones was the youngest of six children; her siblings are Dora, Charles, Ike, Willa and Henry. Jones's mother raised her deceased sister's four children as well as her own. She moved the family to New York City when Sharon was a young child. As children, she and her brothers would often imitate the singing and dancing of James Brown. Her mother happened to know Brown, who was also from Augusta.

Jones grew up in the Bedford Stuyvesant neighborhood of Brooklyn, New York. In 1975, she graduated from Thomas Jefferson High School in Brooklyn. She attended Brooklyn College.

== Career ==
=== Early career ===
A regular gospel singer in church, during the early 1970s Jones often entered talent shows backed by local funk bands. Session work then continued with backing vocals, often credited to Lafaye Jones, but in the absence of any recording contract as a solo singer, she spent many years working as a corrections officer at Rikers Island and as an armored car guard for Wells Fargo, until receiving a mid-life career break in 1996 after she appeared on a session backing the soul and deep funk legend Lee Fields.

The session was organized by Gabriel Roth and Philippe Lehman, then the owner of the now-defunct French record label Pure Records. Jones was the only one of three singers called to the session to show up. Having completed all the backing parts herself, Roth and Lehman were suitably impressed with her performance and recorded "Switchblade", a solo track with Jones. This track and "The Landlord" were included on the Soul Providers' album Soul Tequila, released by Lehman on Pure circa 1996. The Soul Providers—with members of the Brooklyn bands Antibalas and the Mighty Imperials—later formed the Dap-Kings, who became Jones's regular backing band.

Lehman and Roth started a new label based in Brooklyn, Desco Records, now also defunct. Soul Tequila was re-released as Gimme the Paw, which omitted "The Landlord" but kept "Switchblade". Jones recorded and released three 45-rpm singles for Desco: "Damn It's Hot" part 1 backed by part 2, "Bump N Touch" part 1 backed by "Hook and Sling Meets the Funky Superfly" (a medley cover of tracks by Eddie Bo and Bobby Williams), and "You Better Think Twice" backed by "I Got the Feeling" (a James Brown cover). The singles gained some notice among 45 soul and funk collectors, particularly because in the early days of Desco Records some collectors may have believed them to be originals from the early seventies, as they were not dated. These singles were also released on a compilation CD, the Desco Funk 45' Collection, with tracks by various other artists in the Desco stable. Desco had established a firm reputation among enthusiasts. Desco continued to release 45-rpm singles and also released LPs by Lee Fields, the Sugarman 3, the Daktaris and the Mighty Imperials as well as a further compilation of funk 45s. The Mighty Imperials album was the last release on the Desco label, and Lehman and Roth parted ways in 2000. Lehman started another independent label, Soul Fire Records, now also defunct. Roth went on to start Daptone Records with the saxophonist Neal Sugarman of Sugarman 3.

=== Daptone Records ===
Launched on the back of the popularity of Desco Records, Daptone Records' first release was a full-length album by Sharon Jones. A new band, the Dap-Kings, was formed from the former members of the Soul Providers and the Mighty Imperials. Some of the musicians went on to record for Lehman's Soul Fire label, while some formed the Budos Band, an Afro-beat band. From the original Soul Providers, Roth (also known as Bosco Mann) on bass, guitarist and emcee Binky Griptite, percussionist Fernando Velez, trumpet player Anda Szilagyi and organist Earl Maxton were joined by original Mighty Imperials saxophonist Leon Michels and drummer Homer Steinweiss, plus Neal Sugarman from Sugarman 3, to form The Dap-Kings.

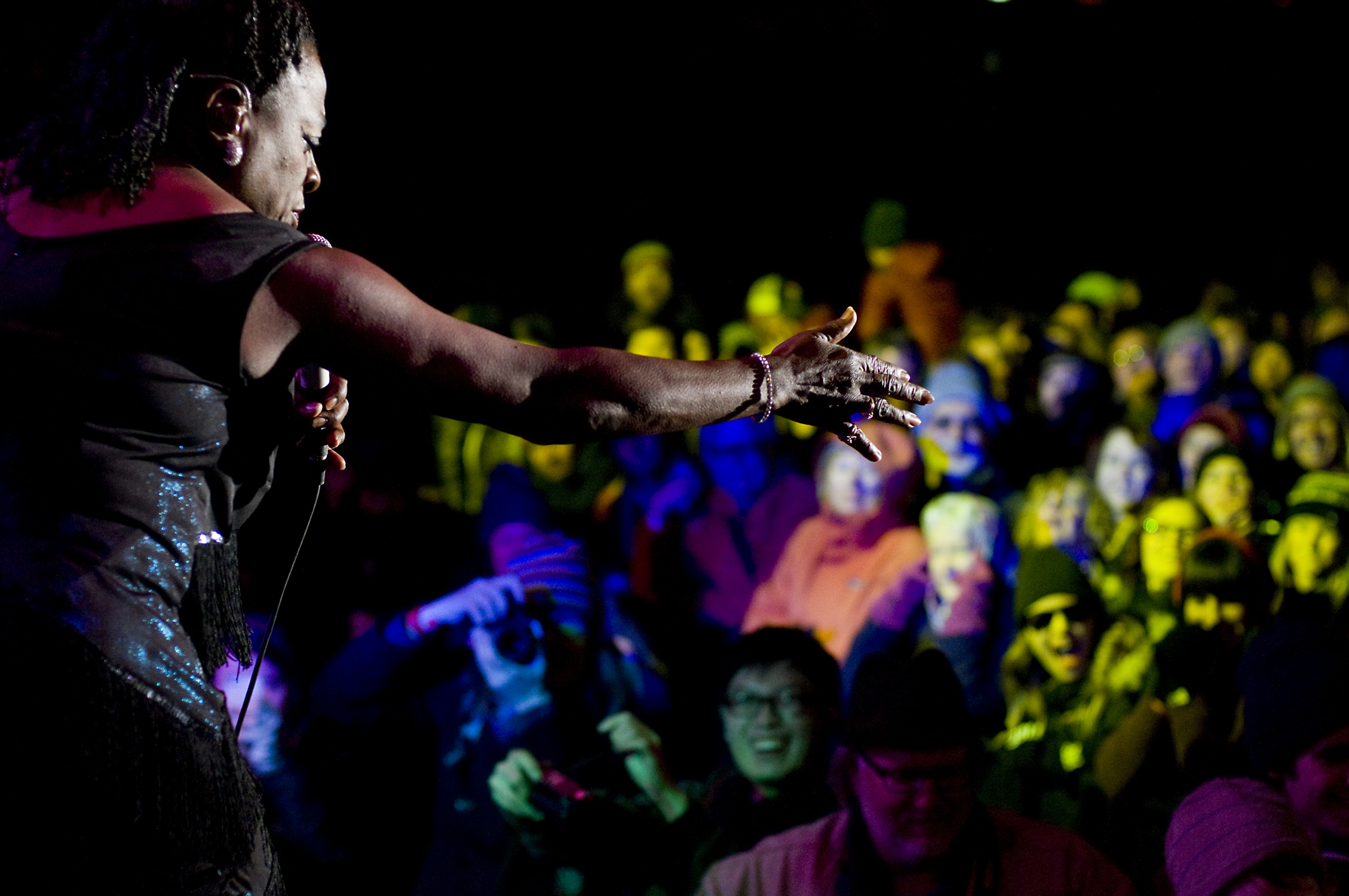
Sharon Jones and the Dap Kings were the headliner act at the 2013 Treefort Music Fest

In 2002, under the name Sharon Jones & The Dap-Kings, the group released the album Dap Dippin' with Sharon Jones and the Dap-Kings, for which they received immediate attention and acclaim from enthusiasts, DJs and collectors. With three more albums under their belt, Naturally (2005), 100 Days, 100 Nights (2007) and I Learned the Hard Way (2010) they are seen by many as the spearhead of a revival of soul and funk.

In 2015, during an interview with Billboard about her Grammy nomination, Jones discussed her commitment to the Daptone Label, an independent company. She cited artistic freedom and the commitment to the band.

=== Film ===
Jones had a small part in the 2007 film The Great Debaters, starring Denzel Washington and Forest Whitaker, in which she played Lila, a juke joint singer. Her performance of Lucille Bogan's "That's What My Baby Likes" is featured in the film, and additional covers by Jones of songs from the 1930s are included on the film's soundtrack. In 2015, a documentary titled Miss Sharon Jones!, directed by Barbara Kopple, debuted at the Toronto International Film Festival.

=== Collaborations ===
- 2007: She performed on tour with Lou Reed, although her appearance in The Great Debaters caused Jones to turn down a stint as back-up singer for Reed's fall 2007 live show built around his Berlin album. She performed one song on the David Byrne–Fatboy Slim collaboration, Here Lies Love.
- 2009: Jones sang backup for Phish during their 2009 Halloween performance of the Rolling Stones's Exile on Main St., at Festival 8, in Indio, California.
- 2009: Jones performed a duet of "Baby (You've Got What It Takes)" with Michael Bublé on his 2009 album Crazy Love.
- 2013: Jones & The Dap-Kings performed on a float during the 87th annual Macy's Thanksgiving Day Parade.
- 2015: Jones performed "Wade in the Water" on the BBC television program Reginald D Hunter's Songs of the South, presented by Reginald D. Hunter.
- 2016: Jones performed "100 Days, 100 Nights" in the closing scenes of the Marvel Netflix TV series Luke Cage. Jones and her band were shown performing live in a Harlem night club central to one of the main story arcs of the series.

== Influences ==
Jones has sometimes been called, especially early in her late renaissance of a career, the Female James Brown.

Amongst Jones's influences were James Brown, Sam Cooke, Aretha Franklin, Ella Fitzgerald, Thom Bell, Otis Redding, Ike & Tina Turner, Marva Whitney, and everyone from Motown. In addition, Jones also cited more recently known artists, such as Michael Jackson, Prince, Erykah Badu, and Beyoncé.

== Personal life ==
For several years she lived with her mother in the Far Rockaway section of Queens, New York.

=== Health and death ===
It was announced on June 3, 2013, that Jones had been diagnosed with bile duct cancer and had undergone surgery, which forced her to postpone the release of the group's fifth album, Give the People What They Want. The diagnosis was later changed to stage II pancreatic cancer, for which Jones had surgery on her liver and underwent chemotherapy. The chemotherapy caused hair loss and for a time she performed bald, refusing to wear wigs.

During the screening of her documentary at the 2015 Toronto International Film Festival, Jones revealed that her cancer had returned and that she would be undergoing chemotherapy again. She suffered a stroke while watching the 2016 United States presidential election results and another the following day. Jones remained alert and lucid during the initial period of her hospital stay, claiming light-heartedly that the news of Donald Trump's victory was responsible for her stroke.

Jones died on November 18, 2016, in Cooperstown, New York, aged 60. Memorial services were held at Brown Memorial Baptist Church in Clinton Hill, New York, on December 14, 2016, and at Imperial Theatre in Augusta, Georgia, three days later.

== Discography ==
=== With the Dap-Kings ===
- Dap Dippin' with Sharon Jones and the Dap-Kings (2002)
- Naturally (2005)
- 100 Days, 100 Nights (2007)
- I Learned the Hard Way (2010)
- Soul Time! (compilation) (2011)
- Give the People What They Want (2014)
- It's a Holiday Soul Party (2015)
- Soul of a Woman (2017)

=== As solo artist ===
Singles

- "Damn It's Hot" (Desco, 1996)
- "Bump N Touch Part 1" / "Hook N Sling Meets The Funky Superfly" (Desco, 1997)
- "You Better Think Twice" / "I Got The Feeling" (Desco, 1998)

As featured artist

- The Soul Providers featuring Lee Fields – "The Landlord" from Gimme The Paw ...And Eleven Other Funky Favorites (1997); vocals
- Norma Jean Bell – "Yes I Am (I'm Gonna Get You)" from Come Into My Room (2001)
- Greyboy – "Got To Be A Love," "Gotta' Stand For Something" & " Everyday Problem" from Soul Mosaic (Ubiquity, 2004)
- Los Walkysons – "Do The Crank / I Idolize You" feat. Sharon Jones (2006)
- They Might Be Giants – "Withered Hope" from The Else (2007)
- Wax Tailor – "The Way We Lived" feat. Sharon Jones from Hope & Sorrow (Decon, 2007)
- Greyboy – "Got To Be A Love" feat. Sharon Jones from 15 Years Of West Coast Cool (2008)
- Lucky Peterson – "Will The Circle Be Unbroken?" from Organ Soul Sessions: The Music Is The Magic (Universal Jazz France, 2009)
- David Byrne & Fatboy Slim – "Dancing Together" from Here Lies Love (2010)
- Booker T. Jones – "Representing Memphis" feat. Matt Berninger & Sharon Jones from The Road From Memphis (ANTI, 2011)
- Steve Cropper – "Come On & Save Me" and "Messin' Up" feat. Sharon Jones from Dedicated: A Salute To The 5 Royales (429 Records, 2011)
- Joe Jackson – "I Ain't Got Nothin' But The Blues / Do Nothin' 'Til You Hear From Me" from The Duke (Ear Music, 2012)
- E.L. Fields Gospel Wonders – "Heaven Bound" (Daptone, 2017)

Other credits

- Gangsters – Heat I (1981); backing vocals
- Ivy – Ivy II (1986); vocals
- Lee Fields – "Let Man Do What He Wana Do" / "Steamtrain" (Desco, 1996); backing vocals
- TriSpirit – "Rejoice" feat. Tonni Smith (2003); backing vocals
- New York Ska-Jazz Ensemble – Skaleidoscope (2005); vocals
- Rufus Wainwright – "Release The Stars" from Release The Stars (Geffen, 2007); backing vocals
- Lou Reed – Berlin: Live At St. Ann's Warehouse (2008); backing vocals
- Naomi Shelton and The Gospel Queens – What Have You Done, My Brother? (Daptone, 2009); backing vocals
- The Gaslight Anthem – "Stray Paper" from Get Hurt (2014); backing vocals
