= The Daktaris =

Cover of Soul Explosion

Professional ratings
Review scores
Source	Rating
Hectic Eclectic	link

The Daktaris, whose name means "doctors" in Swahili, were a funk and Afrobeat studio project from Brooklyn, United States. After recording the album some of its members have gone on to be part of the Dap Kings and Antibalas and features veteran Cameroonian drummer Jojo Kuo on drums, vocals, and percussion. The name of the group was inspired by the TV show Daktari, an American family drama series that aired on CBS between 1966 and 1969, a fictional Study Center for Animal Behavior in East Africa.

Basing its sound on the style of 1970s African musicians like Fela Kuti and Mulatu Astatke, The Daktaris created a fictitious Nigerian backstory for the album Soul Explosion, which included personnel names created by TV on Radio vocalist Tunde Adebimpe, a vintage cover, and a "Produced in Nigeria" label. The group makes reference to its apocryphal origins in the track title "Eltsuhg Ibal Lasiti", which backwards, reads "It Is All A Big Hustle".

Soul Explosion was originally recorded in 1997 and first released in 1998 on the Desco label. It was reissued by Daptone Records in 2004.
