= The Saturday Knights =

American hip hop group

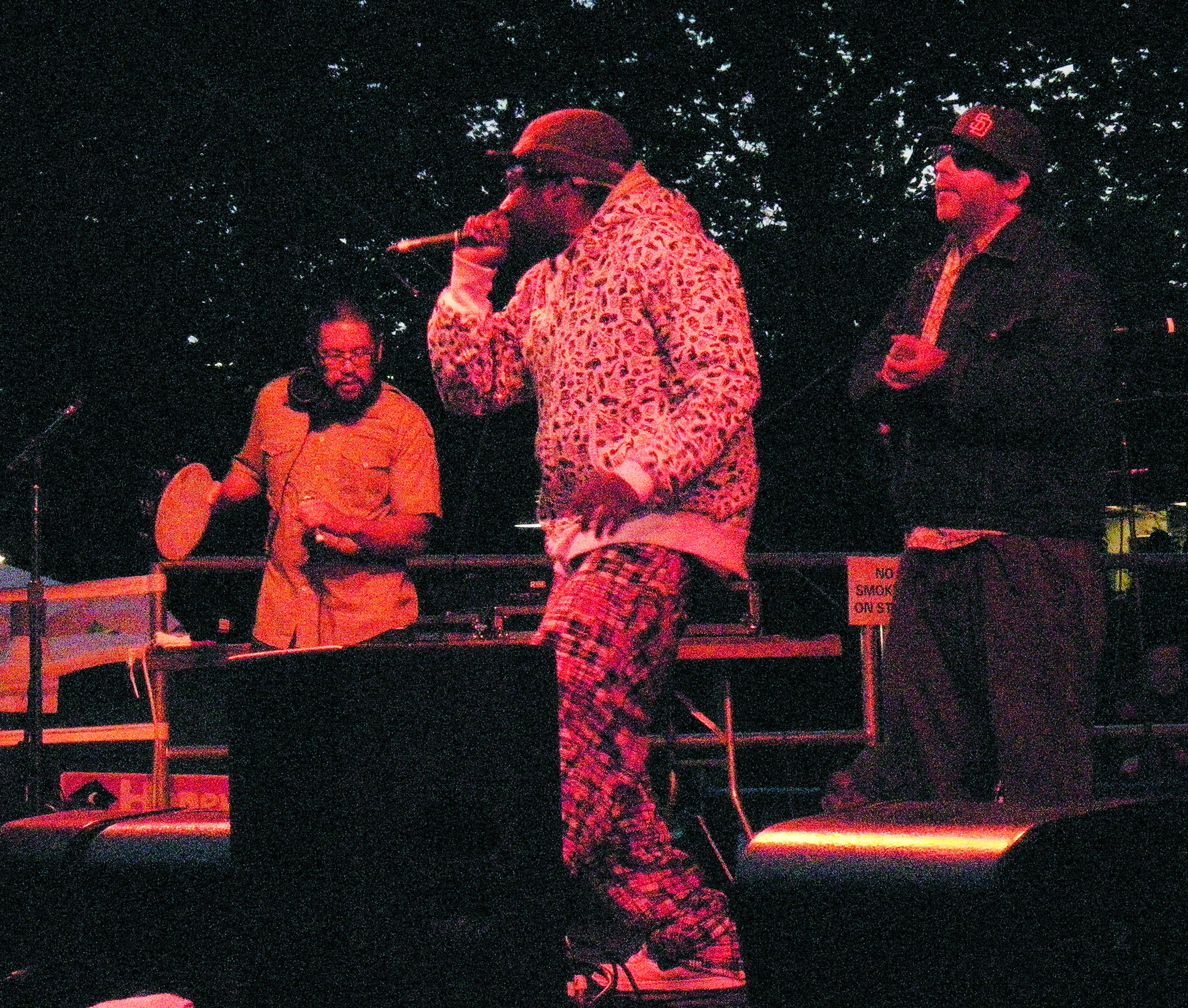
- The Saturday Knights at Bumbershoot 2008. Left to right: DJ Suspence, Tilson, Barfly

Background information
- Genres: Hip-hop, Indie rock
- Label: Light In The Attic
- Members: Barfly; Tilson; DJ Suspence

The Saturday Knights are a Seattle and Tacoma, Washington-based musical group whose music spans many genres, ranging from hip hop to pop music. Their debut full-length CD, Mingle (2008) features guest appearances from the Dap-Kings, Chris Ballew, Jack Endino, Holly Deye (the bassist from Lillydale), Kim Thayil, and Jim Horn & the Muscle Shoals Horns. This crew of guest artists allowed them to recreate samples they wanted to use on this album but could not for legal reasons.

Its members go by the names Tilson, Barfly, and DJ Suspense (Spencer Manio). The group originally included multi-instrumentalist Brian Weber (ex-Dub Narcotic Sound System), who went by the name of "B-Web" and who left the group shortly before their 2007 South by Southwest appearance.

A June 2007 piece in the Seattle Times states that the "genre-flouting" group have been praised by virtually all media in Seattle who cover popular music, but have yet to get geographically broader attention, partly (it conjectures) because their 2007 appearance at South by Southwest in Austin, Texas has been their only non-Seattle-area performance to date.

== Members ==
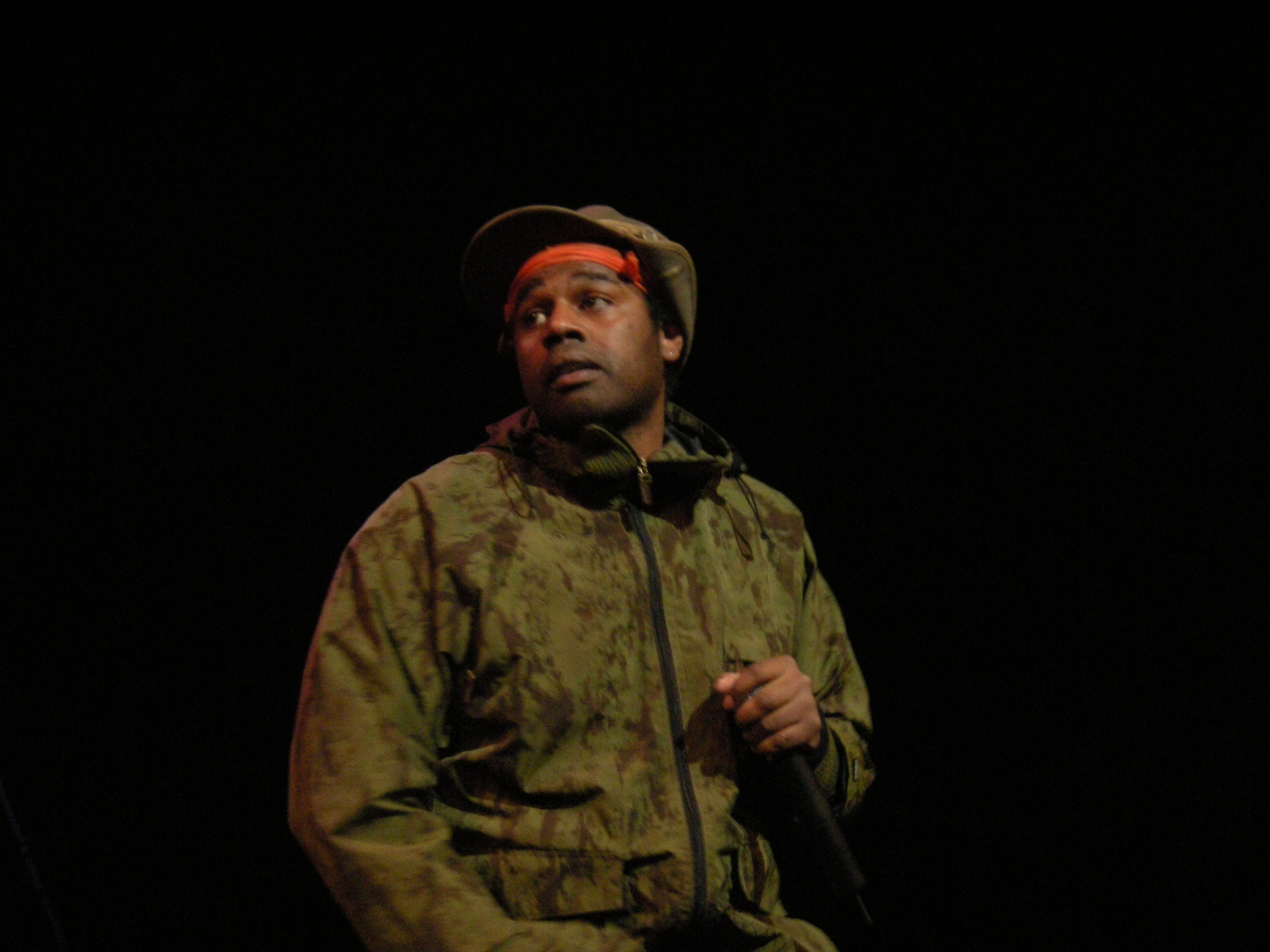
Tilson performing at the launch of Mayor Greg Nickels "Seattle, City of Music" initiative.

- Barfly - vocals
- Tilson - vocals
- DJ Suspense (Spencer Manio) - beats

== Discography ==
- The Saturday Knights, Light In The Attic Records (2007), 4-song EP
- Mingle, Light In The Attic Records (2008), full-length CD
