= Naomi Shelton =

American singer (1942–2021)

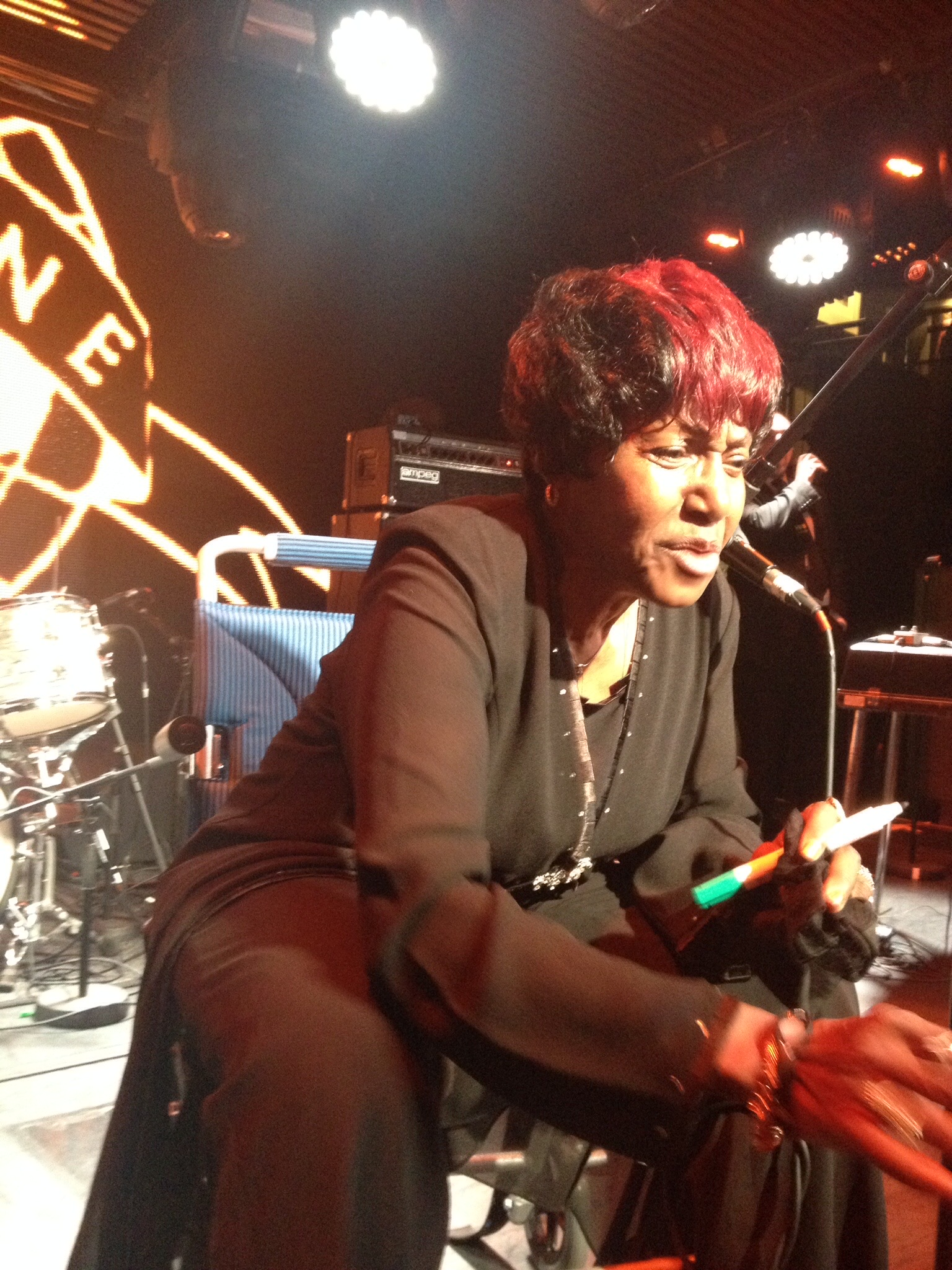
- Naomi Shelton, in 2015

Background information
- Also known as: Naomi Davis Shelton
- Born: Naomi Virginia Davis; October 14, 1942; Midway, Alabama, U.S.
- Origin: Brooklyn, New York
- Died: February 17, 2021 (aged 78) Brooklyn, New York, U.S.
- Genres: Gospel, blues, funk, Soul, black gospel, deep funk, northern soul, rhythm and blues
- Occupations: Singer, songwriter
- Instrument: vocals
- Years active: 1958–2021
- Labels: Desco, Daptone

Naomi Davis Shelton (born Naomi Virginia Davis; October 14, 1942 – February 17, 2021) was an American gospel, blues, funk, and soul musician, who performed traditional black gospel, deep funk, northern soul and rhythm and blues styles of music. She started her music career in 1958, and in 1999 she formed the group Naomi Shelton & the Gospel Queens.

== Biography ==
Shelton was born in Midway, Alabama. She and her two older sisters grew up as members of Mount Coney Baptist Church, and sang together until the oldest graduated from high school. After Naomi graduated in 1958, she moved to Florida and in 1963 she settled in Brooklyn, New York. She worked as a maid while singing at the Night Cap venue in the evenings. She later married Dennis Shelton.

In 1999 she formed the Gospel Queens with Cliff Driver. After a recording deal fell through in the mid 2000s when the label folded, the group signed with Daptone in the late 2000s.Their first studio album What Have You Done, My Brother? was released in 2009, and peaked at No. 41 on the Billboard Top Gospel Albums chart. They released Cold World in 2014, and that album reached No. 23 on the Top Gospel Albums chart.

Shelton appeared as herself in the 2014 film Song One and she contributed one song to its soundtrack. She died in Brooklyn at age 78 in 2021.
