= 100 Days, 100 Nights =

Studio album by Sharon Jones & The Dap-Kings
- Released: October 2, 2007
- Recorded: 2006
- Studio: Daptone's House of Soul (New York)
- Genres: Funk, soul, retro-soul
- Length: 33:48
- Labels: Daptone; DAP-012
- Producer: Bosco Mann

Sharon Jones & The Dap-Kings chronology
| Naturally (2005) | 100 Days, 100 Nights (2007) | I Learned the Hard Way (2010) |

100 Days, 100 Nights is the third studio album by American funk band Sharon Jones & The Dap-Kings. Recorded in 2006, it was released on Daptone Records October 2, 2007.

== Production ==
100 Days, 100 Nights contains influences from sixties era funk and afrobeat. The album was recorded by Bosco Mann at the label's in house studios, Daptone's House of Soul, using a completely analogue system as well as releasing 45's on vinyl with the intent of creating an old school sound reminiscent of the original funk of the 1960s. The first track, also titled "100 Days, 100 Nights" is written about love, making reference to this being the number of days needed for a man's heart to unfold.

== Release ==
The music video for "100 Days,100 Nights", directed by Adam Elias Buncher, was shot exclusively using authentic vintage cameras from the 1950s, and in a simple style likened to a performance on The Ed Sullivan Show.

On the vinyl pressing of the album, Side One has the message "This is a hit!" written in the matrix, or the run-off groove. This is a reference to James Brown and what he had said during the recording sessions for "Papa's Got A Brand New Bag" (as heard on the Star Time box set). Side Two of the album honors Brown with the message "For the Godfather".

The CD pressing of the album includes a promotional bonus disc of selected material from the Daptone Records catalog, presented as a radio program called "Binky Griptite's Ghettofunkpowerhour". This bonus disc runs an additional fifty eight minutes and introduces the fictitious WDAP radio station, featuring an additional 27 tracks of music and dialogue. This promotional disc was never released for individual sale, but was later available as a free download for MP3.

The song Nobody's Baby was used in the pilot episode (titled Lori Gilbert) of the Canadian TV police drama series King.

== Critical reception ==
Professional ratings
Review scores
| Source | Rating |
|---|---|
| AllMusic | 4/5 stars |
| The A.V. Club | B+ |
| Los Angeles Times | 3.5/4 stars |
| Okayplayer | (89/100) |
| Pitchfork | (8.0/10) |
| Robert Christgau | (choice cut) |
| Rolling Stone | 3/5 stars |
| PopMatters | (7/10) |
| Stylus Magazine | A− |

100 Days, 100 Nights received generally positive reviews. On Metacritic, the album has a score of 79 out of 100.

Joe Tangari of Pitchfork gave the album a score of 8.0 out of 10, writing "... They may not be doing anything especially new, but Sharon Jones and the Dap-Kings are the very best at what they do, and they've made another excellent album." In another positive review, Allmusic's Marisa Brown stated "... that's the magic and power of Sharon Jones & The Dap-Kings: their ability to convey passion and pain, regret and celebration, found in the arrangements and the tail ends of notes, in the rhythms and phrasing, and it is exactly that which makes 100 Days, 100 Nights such an excellent release."

Andrew Gilstrap of PopMatters, on the other hand, considered Naturally, Jones' previous album, to be superior to 100 Days, 100 Nights, writing "So 100 Days, 100 Nights is most definitely a Sharon Jones and the Dap-Kings record, but it doesn't announce itself with the same brash authority as Naturally." In an otherwise positive review, Noel Murray of The A.V. Club wrote "... 100 Days 100 Nights doesn't pop with sweaty passion like The Dap-Kings more memorable work, the record retains a ripped-from-the-past vibe that's astonishing in and of itself."

Rhapsody ranked the album #9 on its Rock’s Best Albums of the Decade list. Rhapsody's Justin Farrar wrote "Maybe there's something anachronistic about a band that plays funk music in the 21st century as if Parliament (let alone hip-hop) had never happened. It does sound like Sharon Jones could have cut her record in 1967, not 2007. But when the music's this good, those concerns fly out the window. Jones pours everything she's got into this album, and her gruff, passionate, brassy style grabs you by the collar and doesn't let go until the end. The Dap-Kings restrain themselves behind her, shuffling and jangling but leaving her plenty of space to maneuver on a clutch of good, if not great, songs."

== Track listing ==
| No. | Title | Writer(s) | Producer(s) | Length |
|---|---|---|---|---|
| 1. | "100 Days, 100 Nights" | Bosco Mann | Bosco Mann | 3:45 |
| 2. | "Nobody's Baby" | Homer Steinweiss | Bosco Mann | 2:27 |
| 3. | "Tell Me" | Neal Sugarman, Sharon Jones | Bosco Mann | 2:46 |
| 4. | "Be Easy" | Mann | Mann | 3:03 |
| 5. | "When The Other Foot Drops, Uncle" | Mann, Steinweiss | Mann | 3:15 |
| 6. | "Let Them Knock" | Mann | Mann | 4:29 |
| 7. | "Something's Changed" | Mann | Mann | 2:56 |
| 8. | "Humble Me" | Mann | Mann | 4:05 |
| 9. | "Keep On Looking" | Tommy Brenneck, Steinweiss | Mann | 2:49 |
| 10. | "Answer Me" | James Bignon | Mann | 4:08 |
| 11. | "Settling In" (Bonus Track) |
| 12. | "Collection Song" (Bonus Track) |

== Personnel ==
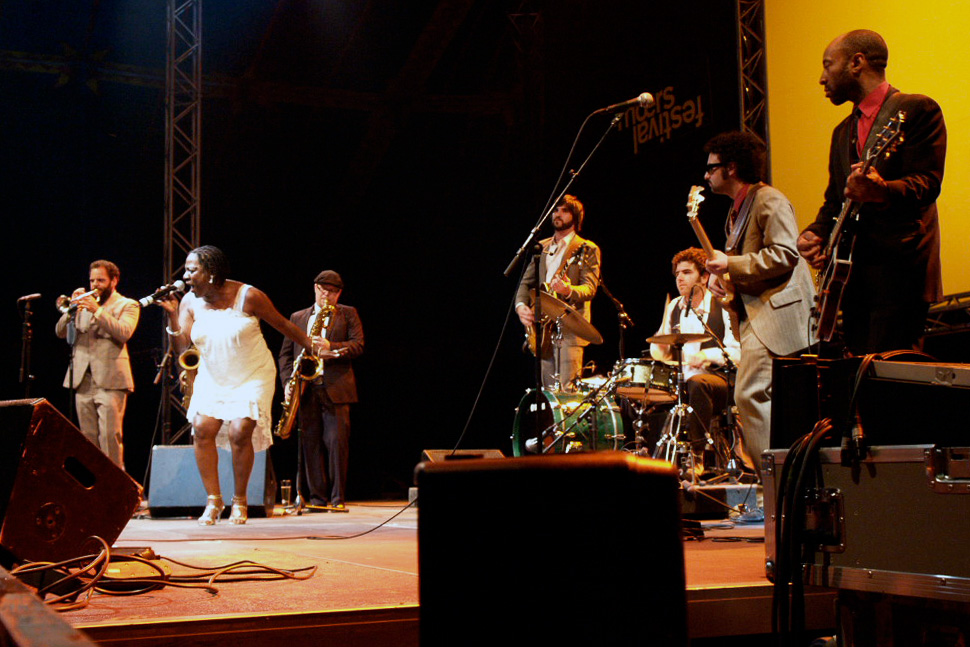
Sharon Jones & The Dap-Kings, moers festival 2007

- Sharon Jones – vocals, piano

The Dap-Kings

- Homer Steinweiss – drums
- Binky Griptite – guitar, emcee
- Dave Guy – trumpet
- Fernando Velez – congas, bongos, tambourine
- Gabriel Roth (aka Bosco Mann) – bass, bandleader
- Neal Sugarman – tenor saxophone
- Thomas Brenneck – guitar
- Ian Hendickson-Smith – baritone saxophone

Additional musicians

- Toby Pazner – vibraphone
- Aaron Johnson – trombone
- The Bushwick Philharmonic – strings
- The Voices Of Thunder – backup vocals on track 1
- Cliff Driver – piano on track 1
- Earl Maxton – organ on track 1, clavinet on track 3, Piano on track 8
- The Dansettes – backup vocals on tracks 2, 5, 10
- The Gospel Queens – backup vocals on track 3

Technical

- Scott Hull – mastering
- Dulce Pinzon – Cover Photo
- Gabriel Roth – engineer, executive producer
- David Serre – cover design

== Charts ==
Weekly chart performance for 100 Days, 100 Nights
| Chart (2007) | Peak position |
|---|---|
| French Albums (SNEP) | 69 |
| Dutch Albums (Album Top 100) | 53 |
| UK Independent Albums (Official Charts) | 32 |
| UK R&B Albums (Official Charts) | 36 |
| US Billboard 200 | 194 |
| US Heatseekers Albums (Billboard) | 3 |
| US Independent Albums (Billboard) | 22 |
| US Top R&B/Hip-Hop Albums (Billboard) | 97 |
