= Retro-soul =

Genre of music

Retro soul
- Stylistic origins: Soul music; blues; R&B; funk; gospel
- Cultural origins: Late 1990s–present, United States

Other topics
- Neo soul

Retro soul, sometimes written as retro-soul, is a contemporary popular music genre that emulates the singing, arrangements and recording techniques of traditional American soul music from the 1950s to the 1970s. This differs from neo-soul and contemporary R&B as it intentionally emphasizes a vintage style.

This music was brought to mainstream popularity by singer Amy Winehouse in 2006. Her Grammy Award-winning Back to Black record production sported a vintage soul style and featured the backing from the Dap-Kings. Subsequent releases by artists Sharon Jones, Mayer Hawthorne, Adrian Younge, Raphael Saadiq, Lee Fields, Shoshana Bean and Charles Bradley continued in this tradition.

== Background ==
Retro soul started in the late 1990s in New York City, with the vintage focused recordings from Desco (now Daptone Records). Hip hop producers craved sampling material, and the small label presented vinyl recordings emulating the style of 1960s and 1970s soul and music. This music was initially released to represent that the music may be rare or lost recordings that were somehow unearthed, although they were technically brand new recordings. The popularity grew, finding the music being played frequently on US college radio. In addition, some of these recordings were used as material for sampling in hip hop and electronic recordings.

== Characteristics ==
The musical style is recognized by both the arrangements and instrumentation from classic soul music of the 1950s until the 1970s. It is largely non-electronic. The instrumentation includes drum kit, electric bass, percussion, electric piano, electric guitar, Hammond organ, piano, saxophone, trumpet and trombone. The music is both instrumental and with vocals. The repertoire includes ballads, mid tempos and uptempos. The rhythms can include Motown, funk, and Sentimental ballad.

== Record labels ==
Desco Records (Brooklyn, 1996–2000)

- Founded by Phillip Lehman and Bosco Mann, the label was an early home to New York's artists. Lehman and Mann split ways to pursue different sounds in 2000.

Daptone Records (Brooklyn, 2004–present)

- Bosco Mann would go on to found Daptone with Neal Sugarman. Daptone is one of the best-regarded soul revival labels and is known for Sharon Jones & the Dap-Kings and Charles Bradley.

Truth & Soul Records (Brooklyn, 2004–2016)

- Following Desco, Lehman would run the short-lived label Soul Fire (1999–2003) before handing the studio over to Soul Fire musicians and producers Leon Michels and Jeff Silverman. Truth & Soul is best known for their Lee Fields & The Expressions releases and relationship with Daptone artists.

Colemine Records (Ohio, 2007–present)

- Founded by Terry Cole in the Greater Cincinnati area, Colemine has put out releases by artists from around the country including The Dip, Durand Jones & The Indications, and Black Pumas.

Stax Records (Memphis, 2007–present)

- Legacy soul label which relaunched in 2007 as part of the Concord Records group. Prominent contemporary artists include Ben Harper and Nathaniel Rateliff and the Night Sweats.

Stones Throw Records (Los Angeles, 1996–present)

- Primary a hip hop label, Stones Throw has championed pop-leaning retro-soul artists like Aloe Blacc and Mayer Hawthorne.

Now-Again Records (Los Angeles, 2002–present)

- A former funk and soul reissue subsidiary of Stones Throw, Now-Again is best known for their regional and global funk and psych rock compilations. The label is home to acts including The Whitefield Brothers, Heliocentrics, and Breakestra.

Big Crown Records (Brooklyn, 2016–present)

- is a Brooklyn-based independent record label started by Leon Michels & Danny Akalepse.

this is second record label Michels and Akalepse had built from the ground up.
