= Dap Dippin' with Sharon Jones and the Dap-Kings =

Studio album by Sharon Jones & the Dap-Kings
- Released: May 14, 2002
- Genres: Funk, soul
- Length: 45:24
- Labels: Daptone Records; DAP-001
- Producer: Bosco Mann

Sharon Jones & the Dap-Kings chronology
Dap Dippin' with Sharon Jones and the Dap-Kings (2002)	Naturally (2005)

Professional ratings
Review scores
Source	Rating
Allmusic	4/5 stars

Dap Dippin' with Sharon Jones and the Dap-Kings is the debut album by Sharon Jones & the Dap-Kings, released in 2002. It is also the first full-length release from Daptone Records.

== Track listing ==
All tracks are written by Bosco Mann, except where noted.

No.	Title	Writer(s)	Length
1.	"(Introduction)"		1:30
2.	"Got a Thing on My Mind"		2:58
3.	"What Have You Done for Me Lately?"	Jimmy Harris, Terry Lewis, Janet Jackson	3:16
4.	"The Dap Dip"		4:01
5.	"Give Me a Chance"		3:10
6.	"Cut That Line" (not included in the first release)		3:28
7.	"Will You Be True" (featuring Lee Fields. Included in 2014 remastered edition)
8.	"Got to Be the Way It Is"		3:26
9.	"Make It Good to Me"		4:52
10.	"Ain't It Hard"		4:30
11.	"Pick It up, Lay It in the Cut"		4:08
12.	"Casella Walk"		10:02

== Personnel ==
- Sharon Jones – Vocals
- Gabriel Roth (Bosco Mann) – Bass, Bandleader, Producer
- Leon Michels – Tenor Saxophone
- Jack Zapata (Martin Perna) – Baritone Saxophone
- Binky Griptite – Guitar, Emcee
- Fernando Velez – Conga
- Earl Maxton (Victor Axelrod) – Organ
- Homer Steinweiss – Drums
- Anda Szilagyi – Trumpet
