= I Learned the Hard Way =

Studio album by Sharon Jones & The Dap-Kings
- Released: April 6, 2010
- Recorded: 2009–2010
- Studio: Daptone's House of Soul (New York City)
- Genre: Soul, funk
- Length: 39:31
- Label: Daptone; DAP-019
- Producer: Gabriel "Bosco Mann" Roth

Sharon Jones & The Dap-Kings chronology
100 Days, 100 Nights (2007)	I Learned the Hard Way (2010)	Give the People What They Want (2014)

I Learned the Hard Way is the fourth studio album by American soul and funk band Sharon Jones & The Dap-Kings, released April 6, 2010 on Daptone Records. Production for the album took place at the label's House of Soul Studios during 2009 to 2010 and was handled by Daptone co-founder Gabriel Roth, credited for the album as "Bosco Mann". The album debuted at number 15 on the US Billboard 200, selling 23,000 copies in its first week. Upon its release, I Learned the Hard Way received generally positive reviews from most music critics.

== Release and promotion ==
The album was released by Daptone Records on CD, vinyl, MP3, and FLAC formats. The vinyl LP release includes a code for a free MP3 download of the whole album from the Daptone Records website. This digital version includes an exclusive bonus track, "When I Come Home." This song was later available as a 7" single. Three of the major digital music stores — the iTunes Store, Amazon MP3, and eMusic — each had their own exclusive bonus track.

== Critical reception ==
Professional ratings
Aggregate scores
Source	Rating
Metacritic	81/100
Review scores
Source	Rating
AllMusic	4/5 stars
The A.V. Club	A−
The Boston Phoenix	4/4 stars
Chicago Tribune	3.5/4 stars
Entertainment Weekly	A−
Pitchfork	8.0/10
PopMatters	8/10
Rolling Stone	3/5 stars
Slant Magazine	3/5 stars
URB	4/5 stars

I Learned the Hard Way received positive reviews from most music critics. At Metacritic, which assigns a normalized rating out of 100 to reviews from mainstream critics, the album received an average score of 81, based on 30 reviews, which indicates "universal acclaim". Critics praised Jones' maturing voice and The Dap-Kings soulful musicianship on the album. AllMusic writer Stephen Thomas Erlewine gave it 4 out of 5 stars and praised the band's incorporation of regional soul music styles, writing that it delivers "songs that swagger and stir the soul, fitting within tradition without being beholden to it". Entertainment Weekly's Whitney Pastorek complimented Jones's singing on the album. The Boston Globe's Siddhartha Mitter stated "The band is superb, and Jones ... sings of hard times, infidelity, and other life lessons with total authority". Richard Trapunski of NOW gave the album a 4/5 rating and commended its musical style, stating "Shifting between Philly soul and James Brown funk, the heavyweight horn section provides a suitable backdrop". Boston Phoenix writer Jeff Tamarkin gave it 4 out of 4 stars and praised their "commitment to retro soul", but wrote "they never leave the impression that they’re trying to recapture past glory. This music just feels right on them, and in its own way contemporary". The A.V. Club's Noel Murray complimented its incorporation of "Motown sound" influences, writing that Jones and the Dap-Kings apply "grandeur and polish to what used to be called 'race music'". The Washington Post's Sarah Godfrey lauded the band's "vintage" sound and wrote that it "is so entrenched in retro soul that it creates, rather than emulates, '60s sounds". Delusions of Adequacy writer Bryan Sanchez called the album "a beautiful representation of what real, honest and true soul music really is".

However, some critics viewed the album's material as unvarying to the band's previous work and expressed a mixed response towards its vintage soul style and sound. Q gave the album 3 out of 5 stars and found it "no better than a genuine, crackly, long-forgotten B-side or buried album track that a specialist reissue label might have unearthed". Rolling Stone's Jody Rosen called its musical detail "period-perfect" and commended Jones's vocal ability, but ultimately viewed that "Jones sings with force and feeling, but there's only so much she can do to breathe life into music so in thrall to the past". The Guardian's Dave Simpson gave the album 3 out of 5 stars and called it "almost comically textbook at times, but made with love". Jonathan Keefe of Slant Magazine perceived a lack of "risk" in the band's musical style, but stated "Even if the album is stagnant from an artistic point of view, Jones and the DAP-Kings really do their damnedest to make it seem fresh". In contrast, Nate Chinen of The New York Times expressed that the album "sustains more of a plaintive air, with songs about eroded trust, exasperated patience and wounded indignation". Lindsey Thomas of Spin commended Jones's "brassy" style on the album and called the Dap-Kings "tight and energetic as ever". Steve Jones of USA Today gave the album 3 out of 4 stars and stated "The singer's raw intensity and the band's propulsive energy make satisfaction guaranteed".

URB's Svein Brunstad wrote that Jones's voice "keeps getting stronger in her '50s, echoing the raw power of Tina Turner, the moaning soulfulness of Mavis Staples and the rhythmic swagger of James Brown". Viewing it as "a singer's record", Matthew Fiander of PopMatters noted Jones's progression in her vocal performance and viewed that it contributes to the album's distinctiveness, stating "Jones peels back her fire just enough to emote in quieter ways. As a result, this album—perhaps better than its three predecessors—shows her as an immensely talented singer with a genius eye for how to shape a phrase, how to pull the most out of each word". Chicago Tribune writer Greg Kot compared its arrangements to "'60s Motown and horn-spackled Stax" and complimented Jones's vocal range, stating "Jones' voices veers from an agitated rasp to a vulnerable falsetto, sometimes in the space of a line or two. All the while, she gives the impression of conversing with the listener, whether dispensing a little advice or dishing on a straying lover ... The you-are-there intimacy is Jones’ great gift as a communicator, the reason every one of these songs feels fresh, rather than merely a retro exercise". Brian Richardson of Tiny Mix Tapes commended Jones's vocal "articulation, phrasing, and ornamentation" as "confident and varied, allowing her to sound powerful without being histrionic". Richardson wrote that the Dap-Kings "match her authoritative readings with taut arrangements, outstanding contrapuntal work within the rhythm section, and lavish horn, organ, and string parts". Pitchfork Media's Joe Tangari praised the band's "attention to detail" and called the album "a varied and well-sequenced work".

== Commercial performance ==
The album debuted at number 15 on the US Billboard 200 with first-week sales of 23,000 copies. In Canada, it entered at number 22, its peak position, on the Top 100 Albums chart. It debuted at number 84 on the French Albums Chart, at number 34 in Austria, and at number 19 on Norway's VG-lista Top 40 chart. In the Netherlands, the album debuted at number 32 on the Mega Album Top 100 chart.

== Track listing ==
All tracks are written by Bosco Mann, except where noted.

No.	Title	Writer(s)	Length
1.	"The Game Gets Old"	Dave Guy, Homer Steinweiss, Tommy Brenneck	3:55
2.	"I Learned the Hard Way"		3:47
3.	"Better Things"	Steinweiss	3:40
4.	"Give It Back"	Guy	3:22
5.	"Money"		3:22
6.	"The Reason"	Neal Sugarman	2:20
7.	"Window Shopping"	Wayne Gordon, Lawrence Gordon, Derek Nievergelt	4:35
8.	"She Ain't a Child No More"		2:35
9.	"I'll Still Be True"	Brenneck	3:48
10.	"Without a Heart"		2:45
11.	"If You Call"		3:00
12.	"Mama Don't Like My Man"		2:31

Bonus tracks

DaptoneRecords.com
No.	Title	Length
13.	"When I Come Home"	2:56

iTunes Store
No.	Title	Length
13.	"He Said I Can"	2:50

Amazon.com
No.	Title	Writer(s)	Length
13.	"Without a Trace"	Brenneck	3:52

eMusic
No.	Title	Writer(s)	Length
13.	"Call on God"	Sharon Jones	5:07

Note

- Excluding "Call on God", the retailer-specific bonus tracks were later released on the 2011 compilation Soul Time!.

== Personnel ==
Musicians

- Sharon Jones – vocals
- The Dap-Kings
  - Thomas Brenneck – guitars, piano
  - Binky Griptite – guitars, bass
  - Dave Guy – trumpet
  - Ian Hendrickson-Smith – baritone saxophone, flute
  - Bosco Mann – bass
  - Homer Steinweiss – drums
  - Neal Sugarman – tenor saxophone
  - Fernando "Boogaloo" Velez – bongos, congas, tambourine

Additional musicians

- Victor Axelrod – piano, organ
- Moon Bancs – marching snare
- Cosmo Bann – guitars
- AnGee Blake – background vocals
- Sam Boncon – piano, clavinet
- Chris Cardona – violin
- Amos B. Conn – string arrangement (tracks 1, 2, 11)
- Nydia Davila – soul claps
- Eric Davis – French horns
- El Deuvo – cabasa
- Brian Floody – timpani
- Cochemea Gastelum – alto saxophone, tenor saxophone
- Wayne Gordon – soul claps
- Jimmy Hill – organ
- Aaron Johnson – trombones
- Alex Kadvan – cello
- Kevin C. Keys – background vocals
- Matthew Lehmann – violin
- Michael Leonhart – trumpet
- Leon Michels – tenor saxophone
- Toby Pazner – vibraphone, glockenspiel
- Mikey Post – soul claps
- Boom Boom Romero – drums
- Antoine Silverman – violin, string arrangement (tracks 4, 7)
- Daisy Sugarman – flute
- Entcho Todorov – violin
- Saundra Williams – background vocals
- Anja Wood – cello
- The Bushwick Callers – background vocals (track 5)

== Charts ==
Chart (2010)	Peak position
Austrian Albums Chart	34
Canadian Albums Chart	22
Dutch Albums Chart	32
French Albums Chart	84
Norwegian Albums Chart	19
US Billboard 200	15
US Billboard R&B/Hip-Hop Albums	6
