= Naturally (Sharon Jones & the Dap-Kings album) =

Studio album by Sharon Jones & the Dap-Kings
- Released: January 25, 2005
- Genres: Soul, funk
- Length: 40:16
- Labels: Daptone; DAP-004
- Producer: Bosco Mann

Sharon Jones & the Dap-Kings chronology
Dap Dippin' with Sharon Jones and the Dap-Kings (2002)	Naturally (2005)	100 Days, 100 Nights (2007)

Professional ratings
Review scores
Source	Rating
AllMusic	4/5 stars
IGN	9.5/10
Pitchfork	8.7/10
PopMatters	7/10
Stylus Magazine	A

Naturally is the second album by American funk band Sharon Jones & the Dap-Kings, released on January 25, 2005, on Daptone Records.

== Track listing ==
All songs written by Bosco Mann, except as noted.

1. "How Do I Let a Good Man Down?" – 3:02
2. "Natural Born Lover" – 3:04
3. "Stranded in Your Love" – 5:47 (featuring Lee Fields)
4. "My Man Is a Mean Man" – 3:16
5. "You're Gonna Get It" – 4:59
6. "How Long Do I Have to Wait for You?" – 4:03
7. "This Land Is Your Land" (Woody Guthrie) – 4:31
8. "Your Thing Is a Drag" – 3:33
9. "Fish in the Dish" – 3:18
10. "All Over Again" – 4:43

== Personnel ==
- Sharon Jones – Vocals
- El Michels – Baritone Saxophone
- Neal Sugarman – Tenor Saxophone
- Dave Guy – Trumpet
- Homer "Funky-Foot" Steiweiss – Drums
- Binky Griptite – Guitar, Emcee, Back-up Vocals
- Boogaloo Velez – Congas
- Tommy "TNT" Brenneck – Guitar, Piano
- Bosco "Bass" Mann – Bass, Piano, Vibes, Tambourine, Bandleader

Also featuring:

- Lee Fields – Vocals on "Stranded in Your Love"
- Alex Kadvan – Cello
- Antoine Silverman – Violin
- Entcho Todorov – Violin
- Stuart D. Bogie – Jaw Harp on "Fish in My Dish"
- Earl Maxton (Victor Axelrod) – Organ on "All Over Again"
