= Soul of a Woman (Sharon Jones & the Dap-Kings album) =

Studio album by Sharon Jones & the Dap-Kings
- Released: 17 November 2017
- Recorded: 2015 – 2017
- Studio: Daptone House of Soul
- Genre: Soul, funk
- Length: 35:38
- Label: Daptone
- Producer: Gabriel Roth, Neal Sugarman

Sharon Jones & the Dap-Kings chronology
Miss Sharon Jones! (2016)	Soul of a Woman (2017)

Soul of a Woman is the seventh and final studio album by Sharon Jones & the Dap-Kings, released on November 17, 2017. Sharon Jones had died from cancer the previous year and the album features her final studio recordings.

== Background ==
Sharon Jones was first diagnosed with pancreatic cancer in 2013, but continued to perform and record with the Dap-Kings. After treatment, the cancer went into remission in 2015 but soon reappeared. Soul of a Woman was recorded while Jones went through another round of cancer treatment, and vocal tracks were completed shortly before her death from the disease on November 18, 2016. The Dap-Kings completed the music for the album and released it one year later to commemorate the anniversary of Jones' death. In addition to the group's usual soul and funk revivalism, the album also includes the gospel song "Call on God," which Jones had written in the 1970s while a member of E.L. Fields’ Gospel Wonders. The song had initially been intended for an all-gospel album for Jones, which never materialized. The other songs were written specifically for the album to highlight the strengths of Jones' lyrics and singing voice.

== Reception ==
Soul of a Woman received favorable reviews, with many writers acknowledging the hopeful tone of the lyrics and the strength of Jones' performance, belying the weakened state of her health at the time of recording. For example, the New York Times noted that Jones "sounds anything but fragile... She wails, she shouts, she rasps, she exhorts, she fills phrases with teasing curlicues and holds pure tones endlessly aloft." American Songwriter called the album a "moving soul explosion that stands as one of the finest in her limited yet extraordinary catalog." AllMusic noted that Jones was "at the top of her game here, with her voice in fine shape and her phrasing and delivery on point, finding the right emotional details in the songs and working beautifully with the musicians, delivering powerful work on every cut," while also praising the musical performance by the Dap-Kings. NPR noted, "The mere existence of Soul of a Woman, to say nothing of its excellence, is a testament to the fortitude of all involved."

Consequence of Sound summed up Soul of a Woman and Jones' career by calling the album "a fitting coda to the life of the soul revival superstar whose untimely death from pancreatic cancer at the age of 60 cut short a stunning late-in-life ascendance." The Spill Magazine declared that "each song truly demonstrates the best of Jones and The Dap Kings making for a remarkable tribute to the life of Jones, proving once again that she had a truly incredible voice that was nothing short of legendary."

== Track listing ==
No.	Title	Length
1.	"Matter of Time"	3:22
2.	"Sail On!"	3:00
3.	"Just Give Me Your Time"	2:29
4.	"Come and Be a Winner"	2:56
5.	"Rumors"	2:33
6.	"Pass Me By"	3:20
7.	"Searching for a New Day"	3:14
8.	"These Tears (No Longer for You)"	3:35
9.	"When I Saw Your Face"	3:23
10.	"Girl! (You Got to Forgive Him)"	4:09
11.	"Call on God"	3:37
Total length:		35:38

== Personnel ==
- Sharon Jones - vocals
- Joseph M. Crispiano - guitar
- Cochemea Gastelum - baritone saxophone
- Binky Griptite - guitar
- Dave Guy - trumpet, bass
- Bosco Mann - bass, guitars, orchestral chimes, organ, tambourine, vibraphone
- Homer Steinweiss - drums
- Neal Sugarman - tenor saxophone, piano
- Fernando "Boogaloo" Velez - tambourine, congas

Additional musicians

- Victor Axelrod - organ
- Thomas Brenneck - guitar
- Christopher Cardona - violin
- Chris Davis - piano, trumpet
- Starr Duncan - backing vocals
- Brian Floody - timpani
- Rachel Golub - violin
- Ian Hendrickson-Smith - saxophone
- Alex Kadvan - cello
- Kevin Keys - backing vocals
- Ann Lehmann - violin
- Peter Sachon - cello
- Saun & Starr - backing vocals
- Antoine Silverman - violin
- Hiroko Taguchi - violin
- Entcho Todorov - violin
- Saundra Williams - backing vocals
- Brian Wolfe - drums
- Anja Wood - cello
