= Lee Fields =

American singer-songwriter

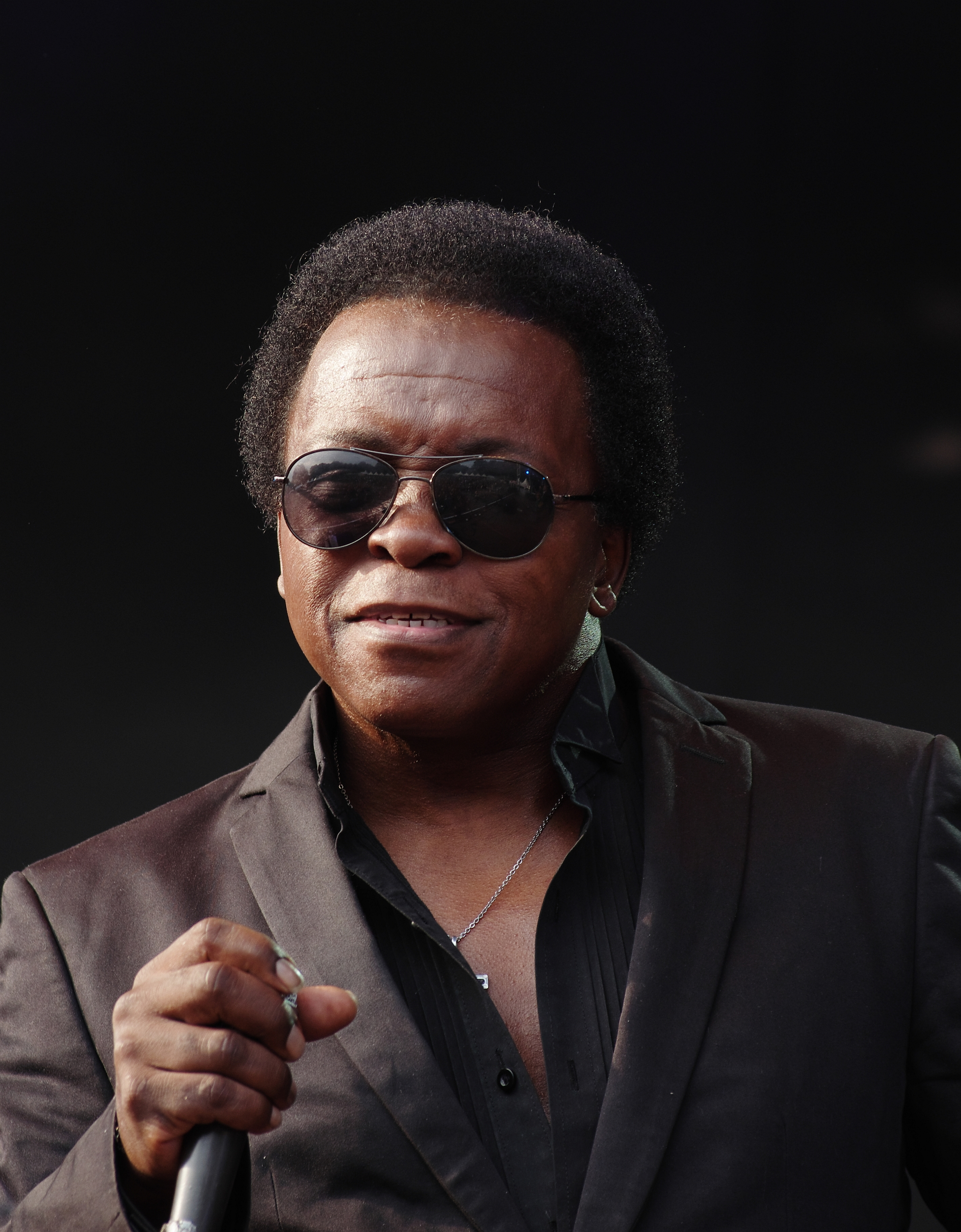
- Lee Fields at Haldern Pop (2013)

Background information
- Born: Elmer Lee Fields; April 26, 1950 (age 76); Wilson, North Carolina, United States
- Origin: Plainfield, New Jersey, United States
- Genres: Soul, funk, R&B, retro-soul
- Occupations: Singer, songwriter, composer, musician
- Years active: 1969-present
- Labels: Big Crown Records, Truth and Soul Records, Desco Records, Daptone Records
- Website: www.leefieldsandtheexpressions.com

Elmer Lee Fields (born April 26, 1950) is an American soul singer, sometimes nicknamed "Little JB" for his physical and vocal resemblance with James Brown. He has recorded with Kool and the Gang, Hip Huggers, O. V. Wright, Darrell Banks, and Little Royal. Fields has also worked with musicians such as B. B. King, Clarence Carter, Dr. John, Tyrone Davis, Johnny Taylor, Denise LaSalle, Bobby Blue Bland, Betty Wright, The Manhattans, Little Milton and Bobby Womack. He recorded his first single in 1969 and is still active. His recent work is with The Expressions, including the albums Faithful Man (2012), Special Night (2017), and It Rains Love (2019). In 2014, he provided additional vocals for the James Brown biographical movie, Get On Up.

== Early life ==
Fields was born in Wilson, North Carolina, United States, the son of Emma Jean Fields and John Fields. He was the second child of six children.

Fields had an interest in music from an early age. He decided to go to New York, at the age of 17 to pursue a music career. Although his mother (whom he later named an album in honor of) tried to convince him not to go, she ended up giving him her last 20 dollars. With moves and style inspired by James Brown, Fields soon had the nickname "Little JB". He moved to Plainfield, New Jersey at the time of his marriage, in his late teens.

== Career ==
=== Early career (1969–1981) ===
In 1969, Fields released his first single on the Bedford label, "Bewildered" b/w "Tell Her I Love Her". He recorded "Gonna Make Love" on London Records in 1973. That same year, Fields released the popular single, "Let's Talk It Over" b/w "She's a Love Maker". Fields released "Everybody Gonna Give Their Thing Away to Somebody (Sometime)" b/w "East Coast Rapper," on SoundPlus in 1975. Most of the second half of the 1970s Fields spent cutting singles for Angle 3 Records, including "The Bull Is Coming" b/w "Funky Screw". In 1979 he released a full-length album with Angle 3 called Let's Talk It Over.

In the 1980s, disco became increasingly popular, at the expense of soul. Venues that had previously booked Fields now booked DJs instead. Fields moved into real estate in Newark, New Jersey, in order to provide for his family.

=== Blues and dance music (1990s–2008) ===
In the 1990s, Fields returned singing soul-blues on the Southern circuit. He signed with Mississippi-based Ace Records and debuted Enough Is Enough. On Ace, Fields released Coming to Tear the Roof Down in 1995 and Dreaming Big Time in 1996 in which he played keyboards and synthesizers.

Later that year Fields signed to Desco Records founded by Gabriel Roth and Phillip Lehman. Sharon Jones, who was signed to Desco also at that time, sang backup for Fields on an early single. Fields was featured on the debut album Gimmie the Paw by the label's band The Soul Providers in 1997. He released several singles with Desco and in 1999, released a full-length album Let's Get a Groove On. Desco later split into Daptone Records and Soul Fire, and Fields eventually recorded for them both. "Give Me a Chance" and "Shot Down" were two 7" singles he released on Daptone over 2001-2002 and in late 2002, the album Problems, on Soul Fire. In early 2005 he performed on "Stranded In Your Love" included on Sharon Jones & the Dap-Kings' Naturally' LP. Another duet, "Will You Be True", was included on the 2014 remaster of Sharon Jones and The Dap-Kings' debut album, Dap Dippin' with Sharon Jones and the Dap-Kings.

In 2006 French House DJ Martin Solveig approached him to do a dance track. They toured in France and recorded the songs "Jealousy", "Everybody", "I'm a Good Man", and "I Want You".

=== The Expressions (2009–present) ===
Truth and Soul Records recorded a single with Fields that later became "Honey Dove". Lee Fields & The Expressions released "My World" for Truth and Soul in 2009. In 2011 he followed up with the album titled Treacherous. After releasing Faithful Man in 2012 with Truth and Soul, the singer toured globally. He then released two albums Emma Jean in 2014 and Special Night in 2017 (on Big Crown Records by former Truth and Soul co-founder Leon Michels).

In January 2019, Lee Fields & The Expressions released their latest single, "It Rains Love". Fields released an album, also entitled It Rains Love, in April 2019.

In 2022, Fields released Sentimental Fool, his full-length debut for Daptone Records. In 2023, Daptone released Fields' single "Waiting on the Sidelines".

In 2025, Fields was listed among the special guests for Alabama Shakes' 2025 reunion tour.

=== In popular culture ===
Fields' songs have frequently been sampled by R&B and hip hop artists such as J. Cole, Slum Village, Travie McCoy and Travis Scott sampled the track "All I Need" from the album Emma Jean on his song "Antidote".

He has lent his vocals, writing skills and been the featured artist on albums of such artists like El Michels Affair, Kraak & Smaak, Bliss n Eso and Wax Tailor.

Fields' music can be found on various movies, TV shows and video games. In 2008 he performed "You Don't Know What You Mean (To a Love Like Me)" for the soundtrack of the movie Soul Men. Fields's track "Honey Dove" was featured during Law & Order: Special Victims Unit's thirteenth season in 2011 (Episode 10, "Spiraling Down"). The track "Honey Dove" was featured in Season 6 of American Dad in 2011 (Episode 12, "You Debt Your Life"). The song "Wish You Were Here" featured in the second season of the legal drama Suits in 2012 (Episode 8, "Rewind"). In 2014, Fields provided additional vocals for the James Brown biographical movie, Get On Up. The song "Ladies" was played in the movie Magic Mike XXL in 2015. In 2016, the song "Could Have Been" was featured on the TV series Atlanta, he was featured as the musical guest on CBS This Morning, and the song "I'll Be Around" was on the soundtrack of the movie Keeping Up with the Joneses. A brief excerpt of "It Rains Love" can be heard during the end titles of the 2020 BBC series Trigonometry. In 2023, the song "Forever" was featured in highest rated Super Bowl LVII commercial, also titled "Forever," for the dog food company The Farmer's Dog. Fields' recordings were referenced in several episodes of the 2023 American Arnold Schwarzenegger television series, FUBAR.

A feature documentary about Fields, Lee Fields: Faithful Man, directed by Jessamyn Ansary and Joyce Mishaan, screened at DOC NYC. The film was set for TVOD release in February 2024.

== Personal life ==
Fields and his wife Christine are the parents of four adult children. They reside in Plainfield, New Jersey.

== Discography ==
=== Let's Talk It Over (1979) ===
No.	Title	Length
1.	"Wanna Dance"	5:35
2.	"Let's Talk It Over"	3:09
3.	"Mighty Mighty Love"	3:15
4.	"Flim Flam (Instrumental)"	3:37
5.	"She's A Love Maker"	4:15
6.	"You're My Weakness"	3:40
7.	"Everybody Gonna Give Their Thing Away, Pt.1"	3:00
8.	"Everybody Gonna Give Their Thing Away, Pt.2"	4:30
Total length:		31:01

Deluxe Reissue
No.	Title	Length
1.	"Fought For Survival"	3:14
2.	"Funky Screw"	3:31
3.	"Take Me Back"	3:14
4.	"Cuttin Out (On Me)"	2:44
5.	"Bewildered"	2:43
6.	"The Bull is Coming"	3:33
7.	"You Been Cuttin Out (On Me)"	2:47
Total length:		21:46

=== Problems (2002) ===
Lee Fields and The Expressions released the album Problems in 2002 with Truth and Soul Records.

No.	Title	Length
1.	"Problems"
2.	"The Right Thing"
3.	"Rapping With Lee"
4.	"Bad Trip"
5.	"Get On The Good Foot"
6.	"I Don't Know Where I'm Going"
7.	"Clap Your Hands"
8.	"Honey Dove"
9.	"I'm The Man"
10.	"You Made A New Man Out Of Me"

=== My World (2009) ===
My World is an album released in 2009 with Truth and Soul Records, in collaboration with the group The Expressions.

No.	Title	Length
1.	"Do You Love Me (Like You Say You Do)"	3:25
2.	"Love Comes And Goes"	3:11
3.	"Honey Dove"	4:06
4.	"Money I$ King"	3:18
5.	"My World Is Empty"	4:01
6.	"Expressions Theme"	2:51
7.	"My World"	3:27
8.	"Ladies"	4:17
9.	"These Moments"	3:08
10.	"The Only One Loving You"	4:09
11.	"Last Ride"	3:40

=== Faithful Man (2012) ===
Lee Fields released the album Faithful Man in 2012 with Truth and Soul Records.

No.	Title	Length
1.	"Faithful Man"	4:06
2.	"I Still Got It"	3:37
3.	"You're the Kind of Girl"	4:01
4.	"I'm Still Hanging On"	3:28
5.	"Intermission"	2:00
6.	"Wish You Were Here"	4:12
7.	"Who Do You Love"	2:51
8.	"Moonlight Mile"	3:38
9.	"It's All Over (But The Crying)"	4:10
10.	"Walk On Through That Door"	5:38

=== Emma Jean (2014) ===
Lee Fields released the album Emma Jean in 2014 with Truth and Soul Records.

No.	Title	Length
1.	"Just Can't Win"	4:04
2.	"Magnolia" (J.J. Cale cover)	3:20
3.	"Paralyzed"	2:57
4.	"Standing By Your Side"	3:48
5.	"Eye To Eye"	4:15
6.	"In The Woods" (Leon Russell cover)	3:30
7.	"All I Need"	3:34
8.	"Still Gets Me Down"	4:13
9.	"Talk To Somebody"	4:04
10.	"Stone Angel"	5:09
11.	"Don't Leave Me This Way"	4:32

=== Special Night (2017) ===
Lee Fields and The Expressions released the album Special Night in 2017 with Big Crown Records.

No.	Title	Length
1.	"Special Night"	5:54
2.	"I'm Coming Home"	3:13
3.	"Work To Do"	3:48
4.	"Never Be Another You"	4:25
5.	"Lover Man"	3:13
6.	"Make The World"	3:40
7.	"Let Him In"	3:45
8.	"How I Like It"	2:55
9.	"Where Is The Love"	3:43
10.	"Precious Love"	4:38

=== It Rains Love (2019) ===
Lee Fields and The Expressions released the album It Rains Love in 2019 with Big Crown Records.

No.	Title	Length
1.	"It Rains Love"	3:55
2.	"Blessed With The Best"	3:49
3.	"Two Faces"	3:43
4.	"You're What's Needed In My Life"	3:38
5.	"Wake Up"	3:44
6.	"Will I Get Off Easy"	3:29
7.	"Love Prisoner"	4:08
8.	"A Promise Is A Promise"	3:06
9.	"God Is Real"	3:19
10.	"Love Is The Answer"	3:35

=== Sentimental Fool (2022) ===
Lee Fields released the album Sentimental Fool in 2022 with Daptone Records.

No.	Title	Length
1.	"Forever"	3:15
2.	"I Should Have Let You Be"	3:00
3.	"Sentimental Fool"	3:05
4.	"Two Jobs"	3:22
5.	"Just Give Me Your Time"	3:08
6.	"Save Your Tears For Someone New"	2:51
7.	"The Door"	3:01
8.	"What Did I Do"	3:44
9.	"Without A Heart"	3:59
10.	"Ordinary Lives"	3:16
11.	"Your Face Before My Eyes"	1:58
12.	"Extraordinary Man"	3:14
