= Ian Hendrickson-Smith =

American saxophonist (born 1974)

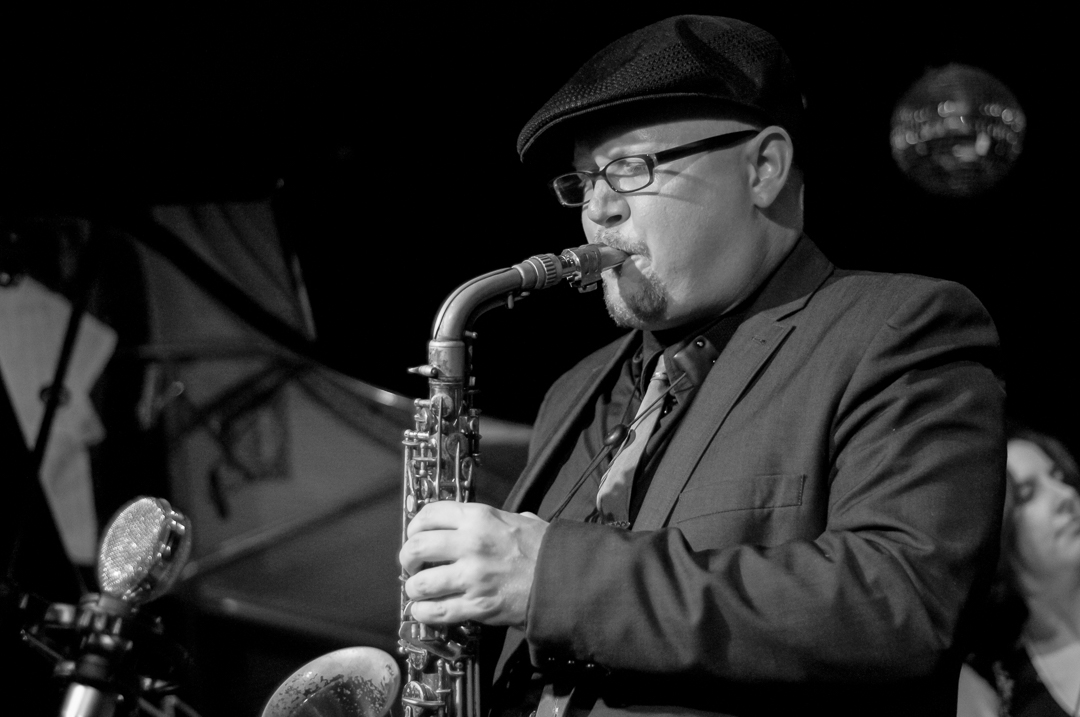
- Hendrickson-Smith performing in 2025

Background information
- Born: February 10, 1974 (age 52); New Orleans, Louisiana
- Origin: State College, Pennsylvania
- Genres: Jazz
- Occupation: Jazz musician
- Instruments: Alto saxophone, tenor saxophone, baritone saxophone, flute
- Member of: The Roots
- Formerly of: Sharon Jones & the Dap-Kings

Ian Hendrickson-Smith (born February 10, 1974) is an American jazz saxophonist. He is best known for being a former member of Sharon Jones & the Dap-Kings from 2004 to 2010 and playing with The Roots on The Tonight Show Starring Jimmy Fallon.

== Musical career ==
Hendrickson-Smith began his professional music career in 1996. He has worked and recorded with Lady Gaga, Bob Dylan, U2, Amy Winehouse, and Ed Sheeran throughout his career. From 2004 to 2010, Hendrickson-Smith was a member of Sharon Jones & the Dap-Kings. As of February 2014, Hendrickson-Smith plays in The Roots, the house band for The Tonight Show Starring Jimmy Fallon.

== Personal life ==
Hendrickson-Smith was born in New Orleans and graduated from State College Area High School in 1992. He later studied jazz performance at the Manhattan School of Music and is equally adept on all saxophones. He currently resides in New York.
