= Sharon Jones & the Dap-Kings =

American funk/soul band (1996–2018)

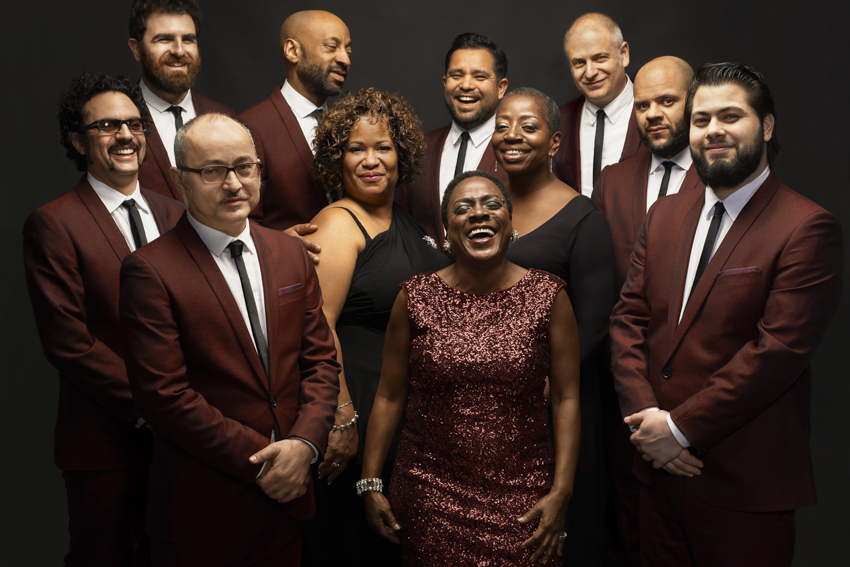
- Sharon Jones and the Dap Kings pictured in 2015

Background information
- Also known as: The Soul Providers (1996–1999)
- Origin: Brooklyn, New York, United States
- Genres: Funk; soul; retro-soul; R&B
- Years active: 1996–2018
- Labels: Desco, Daptone
- Past members: Sharon Jones; Binky Griptite; Dave Guy; Bosco Mann; Neal Sugarman; Joe Crispiano; Fernando Velez; Homer Steinweiss; Cochemea Gastelum; Saundra Williams; Starr Duncan-Lowe; Leon Michels; Earl Maxton; Anda Szilagyi; Thomas Brenneck; Ian Hendrickson-Smith
- Website: SharonJonesAndTheDapKings.com

Sharon Jones & the Dap-Kings were an American funk and soul band signed to Daptone Records. They were part of a revival movement of mid-1960s to mid-1970s style funk and soul music. They released their debut album, Dap Dippin', in 2002, the first of seven studio albums. Their 2014 album Give the People What They Want was nominated for the Grammy Award for Best R&B Album. After Sharon Jones' death in 2016, the band released the posthumous album Soul of a Woman in 2017 and a compilation of cover songs in 2020.

The Dap-Kings, the Daptone house band, are notable for their collaborations with Mark Ronson, including their contributions to Amy Winehouse's Back to Black. The band continued to work and perform together through 2018.

== History ==
=== 1996–2000: The early years with Desco Records ===
In the mid-1990s, artist Phillip Lehman and musician Gabriel Roth (also known as Bosco Mann) founded a band called the Soul Providers, and began recording an album of James Brown-inspired instrumentals and vocal collaborations with deep funk recording artist Lee Fields. After hearing Sharon Jones, a corrections officer turned singer, record backing vocals for a Fields track, Lehman and Roth recorded a solo track of Jones singing "Switchblade", a song which had been intended for a man's voice. This track along with another Jones solo, "The Landlord", were included on the Soul Providers debut album, Soul Tequila, released in about 1996 on the now-defunct French label Pure Records.

Lehman and Roth then started a new label in New York called Desco Records, first on the lower East Side above an umbrella store and later with a studio and distribution office in the basement of an apartment building located at 440 West 41st Street in Manhattan. They reissued Soul Tequila as a vinyl-only LP and renamed Gimme the Paw, and included only one of the Jones collaborations, "Switchblade".

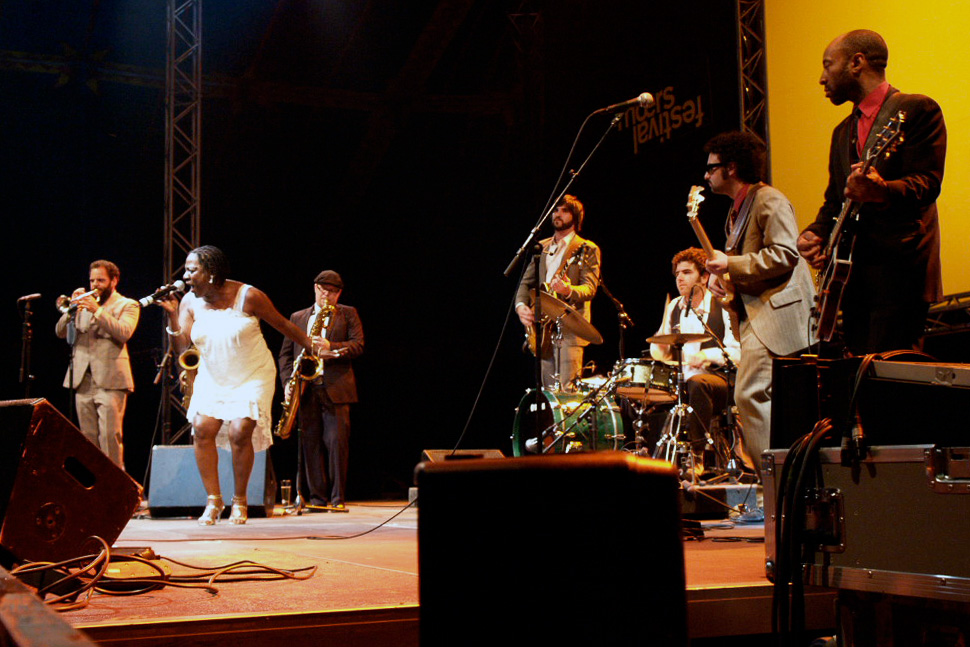
Sharon Jones & the Dap-Kings at the Moers Festival northwest of Düsseldorf, Germany, May 2007

Desco showcased its artists- The Soul Providers and Sugarman Three with shows which were revues and released their music on vinyl 45-rpm records. Jones, backed by the Soul Providers (who had become the Desco house band), released three 45s for the label. Recording dates were deliberately omitted from the labels and the records were often marketed as being released in the 1970s. Two other Soul Providers albums were released, an instrumental soundtrack to a Sam Lung kung-fu film, The Revenge of Mr Mopoji, credited to Mike Jackson and the Soul Providers, and a solo album by Lee Fields, Let's Get a Groove On, for which the Soul Providers provided the backing. Desco recorded, "Funky Sitar Man" by Ravi Harris and the Prophets, released on BBE Record.

=== 2000–2003: The birth of the Dap-Kings and Daptone Records ===
In 2000, Lehman and Roth parted ways, and the Soul Providers disbanded. Lehman set up Soul Fire Records; Roth started Daptone Records with Sugarman 3 saxophonist Neal Sugarman. The next studio location from 2000-2002 was at 340 Grand Street in Williamsburg, in the basement of Amayo's Afrospot and served as the headquarters for Daptone recording projects and the band Antibalas. A new group, the Dap-Kings, was formed, consisting of label owners Roth on bass and Neal Sugarman on saxophone, plus original Soul Providers: guitarist Binky Griptite, organist Earl Maxton, saxophonist Martin Perna percussionist Fernando Velez, and trumpeter Anda Szilagyi. Joining them were two young members of The Mighty Imperials, whose album Thunder Chicken was the last release on the Desco label: tenor saxophonist Leon Michels and drummer Homer Steinweiss, who both had also been touring members of The Soul Providers previously.

The band secured a four week, 20 show engagement at La Boite, a club in Barcelona, Spain, and recorded an LP, Dap Dippin' with Sharon Jones and the Dap-Kings, in 2001. A few hundred copies were pressed, so that sales during the residency would provide financial support for what would have otherwise been a financially draining trip. Promotional copies were sent to funk DJs and reviewers, and the album was officially released as the first LP and CD on Daptone Records in 2002, and attracted an enthusiastic review from quarterly hip-hop and funk magazine Big Daddy.

After the album came out, three 45s not on the album were released: "What If We all Stopped Paying Taxes", released in 2002 just ahead of the U.S. election, was a militant anti-war statement denouncing the Iraq War. "Genuine (parts 1 & 2)" (2004) was a hard funk record. Their cover of "Just Dropped In (To See What Condition My Condition Was In)", released in 2005, was recorded for a KFC commercial in 2002 but was never used.

=== 2003–2006: Naturally and personnel changes ===
About this time Maxton and Szilagyi left the band to become members of Antibalas, a New York-based afrobeat band. Trumpeter Dave Guy and guitarist Thomas Brenneck joined in their stead. In 2003, the Daptone Recording Studio, with a sixteen-track analog tape machine, was open for business. The band intended to record two albums back-to-back, but during the final sessions of the first of these albums, Roth suffered serious eye injuries in a car crash, and only one LP and CD, Naturally, was released in 2005. This album included a mix of both soul and funk influences; the production and recording values were crisper than the slightly duller "scratchy 45" sound of the first album. The band embarked on an international promotional tour.

Leon Michels left the band soon after the release of Naturally to help start a new label, Truth & Soul Records, and released a solo LP that was originally intended for Daptone, Sounding Out the City, credited to El Michels Affair. When Lehman closed the Soul Fire label and moved to the Bahamas, the back catalog of Soul Fire was handled by Truth & Soul Records, who, along with Soul Fire, used many of the same artists in their recordings, including Lee Fields, Steinweiss, Brenneck and Michels himself. The Dap-Kings took on Ian Hendrickson-Smith, a local saxophone player who had released several jazz albums under his own name.

=== 2006–2015: Subsequent albums ===
In late 2006, the band recorded a third studio album, 100 Days, 100 Nights. A non-album funk-style single, "I'm Not Gonna Cry", was released in April 2007, and the album was released in October along with two B-sides/bonus tracks: "Settlin' In" and "The Collection Song". Further albums included I Learned the Hard Way (2010), Give the People What They Want (2014), and the holiday release It's a Holiday Soul Party. Also in 2014, Jones and her band performed at Supercrawl in Hamilton, Ontario.

=== 2016–2020: Jones' death and final releases ===
The recording process Soul of a Woman began in 2015, during which Jones was fighting pancreatic cancer; she had been first diagnosed in 2013. A film about Jones' battle with cancer, Miss Sharon Jones!, was released in 2016 with a soundtrack compilation. Jones died on November 18, 2016, at the age of 60. No specific announcement has been made regarding the band's future; however, the Dap-Kings performed at the 59th Annual Grammy Awards in 2017 and were the house band for Joe's Pub Presents: A Holiday Special, which taped in November 2016.

The Dap-Kings completed the music for the album during this time and released Soul of a Woman on the first anniversary of Jones' death in 2017. They were active as a live performing group through 2018; of note, they played a series of summer shows with Jon Batiste. Two years later, in September 2020, the group announced Just Dropped In To See What Condition My Rendition Was In, an album compiling cover songs recorded over the years. The record was released on October 23, 2020.

== Members ==
Years adapted from album credits, may not be exact.

- Sharon Jones – vocals (2000–2016) ‡

The Dap-Kings

- Binky Griptite – guitar, vocals, MC (2000–2018) ‡
- Gabriel Roth (a.k.a. Bosco Mann) – bass, piano, percussion, producer, engineer (2000–2018) ‡
- Fernando "Bugaloo" Velez – conga, bongos (2000–2018) ‡
- Homer Steinweiss – drums (2000–2018) ‡
- Dave Guy – trumpet (2004–2018)
- Neal Sugarman – tenor saxophone, producer (2004–2018)
- Joe Crispiano – guitar (2013–2018)
- Cochemea "Cheme" Gastelum – tenor saxophone, alto saxophone (2013–2018; contributor: 2009–2013)
- Thomas Brenneck – guitar, piano (2004–2012; contributor: 2012–2016)
- Ian Hendrickson-Smith – baritone saxophone (2004–2010; contributor: 2010–2016)
- Leon Michels (a.k.a. Otis Youngblood) – tenor saxophone, baritone saxophone (2000–2005; contributor: 2009) ‡
- Victor Axelrod (a.k.a. Earl Maxton) – organ (2000–2003; contributor: 2006–2016) ‡
- Martín Perna (a.k.a. Jack Zapata) – baritone saxophone (2000–2003) ‡
- Anda Szilagyi – trumpet (2000–2003) ‡
- Todd M. Simon – trumpet (touring c. 2000s)
- Hagar Ben Ari – bass (touring 2000–2013)

‡ indicates musician who was part of/played with The Soul Providers, active from 1996 to 1999

The Dapettes

- Saundra Williams – vocals (2010–2016)
- Starr Duncan-Lowe – vocals (2010–2016)
- Sharen Lafet – vocals (2013–2014)

== Collaborations ==
Six of the tracks on Amy Winehouse's 2006 album Back to Black feature various members of the Dap-Kings, including two hits from the album, "Rehab" and "You Know I'm No Good". Several tracks recorded at Daptone Studios miscredit the studio as "Dapking Studios". Various members of the band feature on all but one of the tracks on Mark Ronson's second album, Version (2007), which spawned the Amy Winehouse cover "Valerie". The Dap-Kings became the backing band for Winehouse's first U.S. tour. After Winehouse's passing, Sharon Jones and the Dap-Kings joined Nas, Florence Welch, Wanda Jackson, and The Roots in tribute to her during VH1 Divas Celebrates Soul.

In 2007 the Dap-Kings worked with British singer Ben Westbeech to record a new version of his song "So Good Today". Jones lends her vocals on one song, "The Way We Lived", on Wax Tailor's second album, Hope & Sorrow, released in April 2007. Jones is also featured on releases by They Might Be Giants (The Else) and Rufus Wainwright (Release the Stars).

Jones contributed six period numbers by Bessie Smith and others to the soundtrack for the film The Great Debaters, recorded in the Ardent Studio in Memphis. Jones is also a featured on the Verve Records Baby Loves Jazz books/CDs and has had character books published by Penguin Books in conjunction with the series, entitled Ella the Elephant: Scats Like That. Sharon Jones and the Dap-Kings are featured on Michael Bublé's 2009 album, Crazy Love, in the track "Baby (You've Got What It Takes)". In the fall of 2009 Sharon Jones and David Guy appeared with Phish for their musical costume at Phish's Festival 8 in Indio California, where they covered the Rolling Stones' Exile on Main St.

The Dap-Kings horn section backed the Heavy in a 2010 appearance on the Late Show with David Letterman, and they appeared with Muse on Saturday Night Live in 2012, providing support during their performance of "Panic Station". The Dap-Kings appear on the 2012 David Byrne and St. Vincent collaboration Love This Giant. Dap-Kings drummer Homer Steinwess appears on St. Vincent's self-titled fifth album. In 2014, the Dap-Kings horn section collaborated with the Antibalas horn section, Mark Ronson, and Bruno Mars to record "Uptown Funk" and other tracks from Mark Ronson's 2015 album Uptown Special. They also performed "Uptown Funk" together on Saturday Night Live in November 2014.

In February 2017, the Dap-Kings served as the backing band for country musician Sturgill Simpson's performance of his song "All Around You" at the 59th Annual Grammy Awards. In July 2017, it was revealed that the Dap-Kings Horns collaborated with Kesha on her song "Woman", from her album Rainbow.

== In media ==
=== Use in advertisements ===
In 2006, Sharon Jones & the Dap-Kings were featured in an I Love NY commercial directed by Kurt Lustgarten and set to their cover of Woody Guthrie's "This Land Is Your Land". The band's cover of Stevie Wonder's "Uptight (Everything's Alright)" appeared in a Chase Manhattan Bank commercial that same year. In Australia, their song "Got a Thing on my Mind" featured in a 2005 commercial for Cadbury's Boost Chocolate bar.

In 2008 Sharon Jones & the Dap-Kings worked with Tropicana on a song promoting Tropicana orange juice, titled "Sweet & Lovely." Ziggy Marley and Bebel Gilberto were featured in similar projects. In 2015, the song "100 Days, 100 Nights" was used in a Fitbit commercial. In 2016, Sharon Jones and the Dap-Kings appeared in a video covering the Allman Brothers song "Midnight Rider" for Lincoln Motors.

=== Soundtracks ===
Sharon Jones & the Dap-Kings' cover of Woody Guthrie's "This Land Is Your Land", from the album Naturally, plays over the opening credits of the 2009 film Up in the Air. The song is also the first track on the Up in the Air soundtrack album. The same cover plays over the end credits of both the 2007 film Dark Matter and the How to Make It in America episode "Paper, Denim + Dollars" as well as in the end credits of Ken Burns' documentary film Jackie Robinson.

"How Long Do I Have to Wait for You?" was featured in the first season for the television series Hung and included on the soundtrack album. "Longer And Stronger", a previously unreleased track, also made an appearance on the For Colored Girls: Music From and Inspired by the Original Motion Picture Soundtrack in 2010.

"Money", "The Reason", and "Keep On Looking" are used in the video game Sleeping Dogs, which was released in August 2012. The songs can be heard on an in-game radio station called Daptone Radio. Henry's Crime, a 2011 movie, featured the songs "Answer Me", "100 Days 100 Nights", "Got a Thing On My Mind", "Stranded in Your Love", "Be Easy", and "Let Them Knock". The band appeared in the 2013 movie The Wolf of Wall Street. They also appear performing "100 Days 100 Nights" at the end of "You Know My Steez", the 13th episode of Netflix's Luke Cage.

== Discography ==
=== Studio albums ===
- Dap Dippin' with Sharon Jones and the Dap-Kings (2002)
- Naturally (2005)
- 100 Days, 100 Nights (2007)
- I Learned the Hard Way (2010)
- Soul Time! (2011)
- Give the People What They Want (2014)
- It's a Holiday Soul Party (2015)
- Soul of a Woman (2017)

=== As backing band ===
Selected album credits

- Amy Winehouse – Back to Black (Universal/Island, 2006)
- Saun & Starr – Look Closer (Daptone, 2015)
- Sturgill Simpson – A Sailor's Guide To Earth (Atlantic, 2016)
- Elise Legrow – Playing Chess (BMG, 2018)
- Various artists – A Change is Gonna Come (Newport Folk, 2020)

== Awards and nominations ==
| Year | Awards | Category | Nominated work | Result |
|---|---|---|---|---|
| 2014 | Grammy Awards | Best R&B Album | Give The People What They Want | Nominated |
| 2014 | Libera Awards | Video of the Year | "Retreat" | Nominated |
| 2015 | Libera Awards | Hardest Working Artist | | Won |
| 2016 | Critics' Choice Documentary Awards | Best Song in a Documentary | "I'm Still Here" | Won |
| 2017 | Black Reel Awards | Outstanding Original Song | "I'm Still Here" | Won |
| 2017 | Satellite Awards | Best Original Song | "I'm Still Here" | Nominated |
| 2017 | Libera Awards | Best Sync Usage | | Won |
| 2018 | Libera Awards | Best R&B Album | Soul of a Woman | Won |
