= Daptone Records =

Record label

- Founded: 2001
- Founder: Bosco Mann; Neal Sugarman
- Distributors: The Orchard; Redeye Worldwide
- Genre: Funk, soul
- Country of origin: U.S.
- Location: Brooklyn, New York
- Official website: daptonerecords.com

Daptone Records is an American funk and soul independent record label based in Brooklyn, New York. Best known as the home of Sharon Jones & The Dap-Kings and Charles Bradley, the label boasts a roster which includes Menahan Street Band, The Budos Band, The Sugarman 3, and Antibalas, and runs the recording studio Daptone's House of Soul.

== History ==
Daptone Records was formed in 2001 by Gabriel Roth (Bosco Mann) and Neal Sugarman. Daptone was born out of the closure of Desco Records, a label run by Roth with fellow musician Philip Lehman who both played in the band Soul Providers. Roth and Lehman ended their band and business relationship in 2000. Roth, who had played with Sharon Jones as part of the Soul Providers, subsequently founded a new label with Neal Sugarman, leader of The Sugarman 3, as the home of their new group, Sharon Jones & the Dap-Kings.

Their first release was 2002's Dap Dippin' with Sharon Jones and the Dap-Kings. In their first four years, Daptone would also put out Sharon Jones' sophomore album, Naturally, as well as original releases by the Sugarman 3 and Dap-Kings-adjacent The Budos Band.

During this time, they also converted a two-family home in Bushwick, Brooklyn into an analog recording studio space. The first album recorded there was Antibalas's "Who Is this America?" in July 2003. DJ and producer Mark Ronson became a fan of the studio. He brought in Amy Winehouse to record parts of her album Back to Black there with The Dap-Kings and Antibalas members Nick Movshon and Victor Axelrod. The Dap-Kings would tour with Winehouse in 2007.

In addition to Sharon Jones & The Dap-Kings, Daptone has recorded and released the music of Antibalas, The Sugarman 3, The Budos Band, The Poets of Rhythm, The Mystery Lights, The Daktaris, The Mighty Imperials, Lee Fields, Charles Bradley, Binky Griptite, The Sha La Das, and Naomi Davis. The Daptone Record label is inexorably tied to Sharon Jones. The label and members of her band were with her during the last weeks before her death.

Since its founding, Daptone has released over one hundred 45 RPM singles and fifty albums.

=== Imprints ===
As of 2021, Daptone operates four specialty imprints.

- Ever-Soul, an imprint that reissues rare soul singles from the 1960s and 1970s.
- Dunham, a label run by Thomas Brenneck and Homer Steinweiss, best known for their releases of Charles Bradley and Menahan Street Band.
- Penrose, a Southern California offshoot of Daptone began by Bosco Mann in 2020.
- Wick, a subsidiary founded in the late 2010s with a roster of rock-leaning artists.

== Recording studios ==
Daptone built their studio, called Daptone's House of Soul, in a converted two-family home in the Bushwick neighborhood of Brooklyn on Troutman Street. It was very run down when they first rented it, and the neighborhood was not great. Daptone Records has its offices in the top floor, the studio is on the ground floor. The label built the studio from scratch, and made the decision to not have computers, but to rely completely on the more old-fashioned analog recording methods to make music. There are tape machines and a CD recorder, but no Pro Tools or digital reverbs.

The studio is where they have recorded most of their releases. Their distinctive sound is a product of the studio acoustics, recording only on analog tape (no digital), and mixing done by Roth. The recording studio and engineering personnel have been sought out by record producers such as Mark Ronson.

In 2006, Amy Winehouse recorded parts of her Back to Black album at Daptone studios.

In February 2009, Daptone's House of Soul was broken into and thieves made off with the better part of its equipment.

== Artists ==
=== Daptone ===
- Adam Scone
- Antibalas
- Benjamin & the Right Direction
- Bob & Gene
- Charles Bradley
- Cochemea
- Lee Fields
- Jalen Ngonda
- Joseph Henry
- Menahan Street Band
- Naomi Shelton & The Gospel Queens
- Orquesta Akokán
- Saun and Starr AKA "The Dap-ettes"
- Sharon Jones & The Dap-Kings
- The Budos Band
- The Como Mamas
- The Frightnrs
- The James Hunter Six
- The Mighty Imperials
- The Sugarman 3
- The Olympians
- The Sha La Das
- The Womack Sisters

=== Dunham ===
- Charles Bradley

=== Penrose ===
- Thee Sacred Souls
- The Altons

=== Wick ===
- The Ar-Kaics
- The Jay-Vons
- The Mystery Lights
- Michael Rault

== Discography ==
Original logo used for Daptone Records.

Artist	Title	Catalog Number	Release date
Sharon Jones & The Dap-Kings	Dap Dippin' with Sharon Jones and the Dap-Kings	DAP-001	2002
Sugarman Three & Co.	Pure Cane Sugar	DAP-002	2002
The Mighty Imperials	Thunder Chicken	DAP-003	2004 (reissue)
Sharon Jones & The Dap-Kings	Naturally	DAP-004	2005
The Budos Band	The Budos Band	DAP-005	2005
The Sugarman 3	Sugar's Boogaloo	DAP-006	2007 (reissue)
The Poets of Rhythm	Practice What You Preach	DAP-007	2006 (reissue)
The Sugarman 3	Soul Donkey	DAP-008	2007 (reissue)
The Daktaris	Soul Explosion	DAP-009	2006 (reissue)
Bob and Gene	If This World Were Mine...	DAP-010	2007 (reissue)
The Budos Band	The Budos Band II	DAP-011	2007
Sharon Jones & The Dap-Kings	100 Days, 100 Nights	DAP-012	2007
Various Artists	Como Now: The Voices Of Panola Co., Mississippi	DAP-014	2008
Menahan Street Band	Make the Road by Walking	DAP-015	2008
Naomi Shelton & the Gospel Queens	What Have You Done, My Brother	DAP-016	2009
Pax Nicholas & The Nettey Family	Na Teef Know de Road of Teef	DAP-017	2009 (reissue)
Various Artists	Daptone Gold (label sampler)	DAP-018	2009
Sharon Jones & The Dap-Kings	I Learned the Hard Way	DAP-019	2010
The Budos Band	The Budos Band III	DAP-020	2010
Sharon Jones & The Dap-Kings	I Learned the Hard Way (11x45s box set)	DAP-021	2010
Charles Bradley	No Time for Dreaming	DAP-022	2011
El Rego Et Ses Commandos	El Rego (compilation)	DAP-023	2011
Sharon Jones & The Dap-Kings	Soul Time! (compilation)	DAP-024	2011
Menahan Street Band	No Time For Dreaming (The Instrumentals)	DAP-025	2012
The Sugarman 3	What The World Needs Now	DAP-026	2012
The Como Mamas	Get An Understanding	DAP-027	2013
Antibalas	Antibalas	DAP-028	2012
Menahan Street Band	The Crossing	DAP-029	2012
The Poets Of Rhythm	Anthology 1992-2003	DAP-030	2013
Charles Bradley	Victim of Love	DAP-031	2013
Sharon Jones & The Dap-Kings	Give The People What They Want	DAP-032	2014
Naomi Shelton & the Gospel Queens	Cold World	DAP-033	2014
The Budos Band	Burnt Offering	DAP-034	2014
Saun & Starr	Look Closer	DAP-035	2015
Various Artists	Daptone Gold, Vol. II (label sampler)	DAP-036	2015
Sharon Jones & The Dap-Kings	It's A Holiday Soul Party	DAP-037	2015
The Dap-Kings	A Closer Look at The Dap-Kings: The Instrumentals Behind Saun & Starr's "Look Closer"	DAP-038	2018
Walker Family Singers	Panola County Spirit	DAP-039	2016
The James Hunter Six	Hold On!	DAP-040	2016
Charles Bradley	Changes	DAP-041	2016
The Frightnrs	Nothing More To Say	DAP-042	2016
Sharon Jones & The Dap-Kings	Miss Sharon Jones! (Original Motion Picture Soundtrack)	DAP-043	2016
The Olympians	The Olympians	DAP-044	2016
The Como Mamas	Move Upstairs	DAP-045	2017
Antibalas	Where the gods are in peace	DAP-046	2017
Bob & Gene	If This World Were Mine	DAP-047	2017 (reissue)
The Frightnrs	More To Say Versions	DAP-048	2017
The Daktaris	Soul Explosion	DAP-049	2018
Sharon Jones & The Dap-Kings	Soul Of A Woman	DAP-050	2017
The James Hunter Six	Whatever it takes	DAP-051	2017
Orquesta Akokán	Orquesta Akokán	DAP-052	2018
The Sha La Das	Love In The Wind	DAP-053	2018
Charles Bradley	Black Velvet	DAP-054	2018
Cochemea	All My Relations	DAP-055	2019
Innov Gnawa	Lila	DAP-056	2021
The Budos Band	V	DAP-057	2019
Antibalas	Fu Chronicles	DAP-060	2020
Orquesta Akokán	16 Rayos	DAP-064	2021
Cochemea	Vol 2: Baca Sewa	DAP-067	2021
Various Artists	Daptone Super Soul Revue Live at the Apollo	DAP-069	2021
Victor Axelrod	If You Ask Me To...	DAP-070	2023
The Frightnrs	Always	DAP-071	2022
The James Hunter Six	With Love	DAP-072	2022
Scone Cash Players	Brooklyn to Brooklin	DAP-073	2022
Thee Sacred Souls	Thee Sacred Souls	DAP-074	2022
Lee Fields	Sentimental Fool	DAP-075	2023
Jalen Ngonda	Come Around and Love Me	DAP-076	2023
Orquesta Akokán	Caracoles	DAP-077	2024
Thee Sacred Souls	Got A Story To Tell	DAP-078	2024
The Altons	Heartache In Room 14	DAP-079	2025
Cochemea	Vol 3: Ancestros Futuros	DAP-080	2025
Antibalas	Hourglass	DAP-081	2025
The Olympians	In Search of a Revival	DAP-083	2026
Jalen Ngonda	Doctrine of Love	DAP-084	2026
Orquesta Akokán	América!	DAP-085	2026
The Womack Sisters	The Womack Sisters	DAP-086	2026

== Notable awards ==
Grammy Awards

- 2021: Antibalas, Fu Chronicles – Best Global Music Album (nominated)
- 2019: Orquesta Akokán, Orquesta Akokán – Best Tropical Latin Album (nominated)
- 2014: Sharon Jones & the Dap-Kings, Give The People What They Want – Best R&B Album (nominated)

A2IM Libera Awards

- 2021: Antibalas, Fu Chronicles – Best World Record
- 2021: Label of the Year (Small)
- 2019: Orquesta Akokán, Orquesta Akokán – Best Latin Album (nominated)
- 2019: Charles Bradley, Black Velvet – Best R&B Album (won)
- 2019: Charles Bradley, Black Velvet Deluxe – Creative Packaging (nominated)
- 2019: Label of the Year (Small) (won)
- 2018: Sharon Jones & the Dap-Kings, Soul of a Woman – Best R&B Album (won)
- 2018: Label of the Year (Small) (won)
- 2017: Charles Bradley, Changes – Best Blues/Jazz/R&B Album (won)
- 2017: Charles Bradley – Best Live Act (nominated)
- 2017: Sharon Jones & the Dap-Kings (Neal Sugarman) – Best Sync Usage (won)
- 2017: Label of the Year (Small) (won)
- 2017: Charles Bradley, Changes – Marketing Genius (nominated)
- 2016: Label of the Year (Small) (won)
- 2015: Sharon Jones & The Dap-Kings – Hardest Working Artist (won)
- 2015: Naomi Shelton & The Gospel Queens, Cold World – Best Heritage Album (nominated)
- 2015: Label of the Year (Small) (nominated)
- 2014: Sharon Jones & the Dap-Kings, "Retreat" – Video of the Year (nominated)
- 2014: Charles Bradley – Hardest Working Artist (won)
- 2014: Charles Bradley – Best Live Act (nominated)
- 2014: Label of the Year (Small) (won)
- 2013: Antibalas, “Dirty Money” – Video of the Year (nominated)
- 2013: Label of the Year (Small) (nominated)
- 2012: Charles Bradley – Road Warrior of the Year (won)
- 2012: Label of the Year (Small) (won)

== See also ==
- Daptone Records artists
- Daptone Records albums
- Bosco Mann
- Sharon Jones
- Sharon Jones & The Dap-Kings
- Truth & Soul Records
