= Bosco Mann =

American songwriter (born 1974)

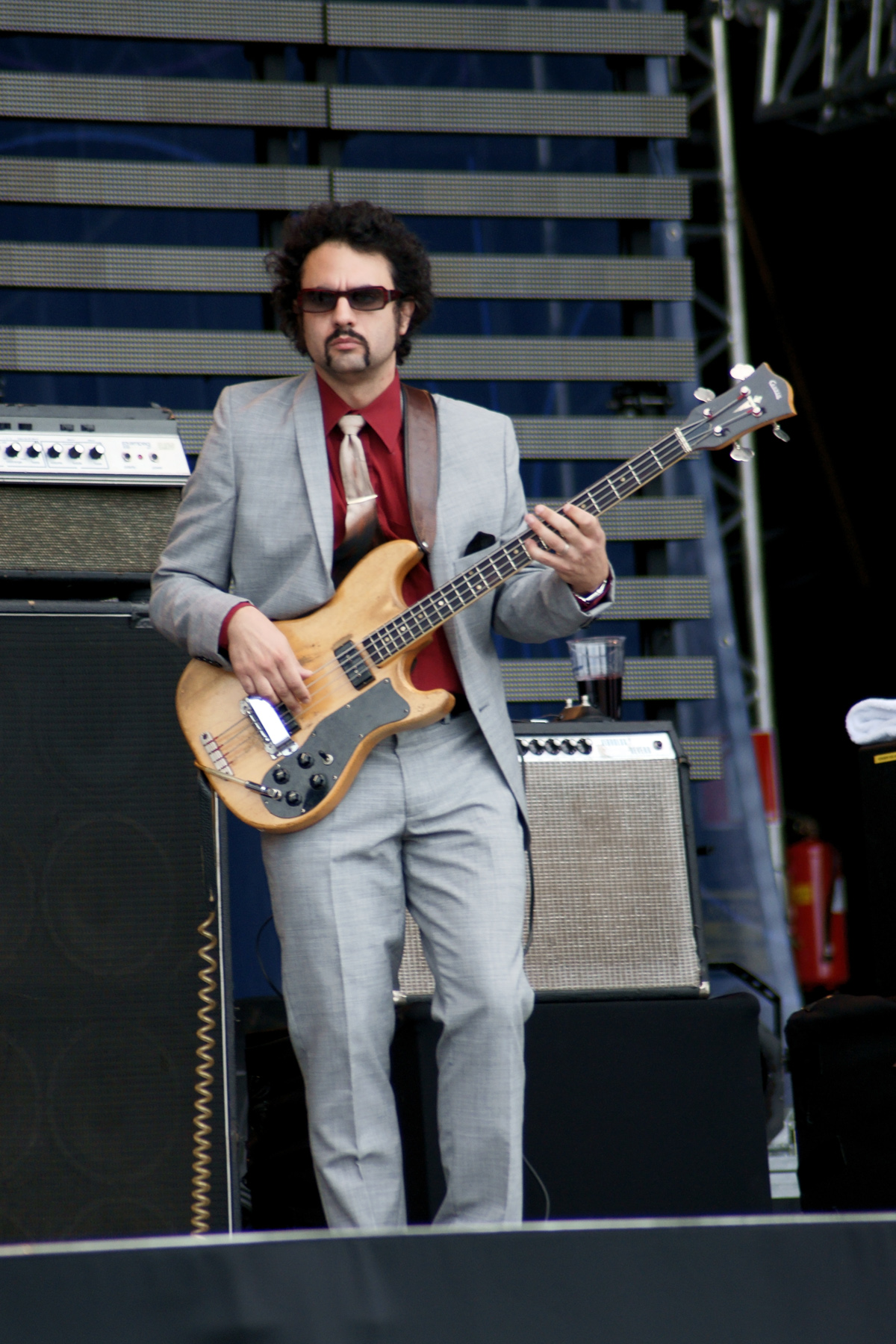
- Roth with the Dap-Kings in 2010.

Background information
- Also known as: Bill "Ravi" Harris, Mike Jackson, Clement Apaokagi
- Born: Gabriel Alexander Roth; August 17, 1974 (age 52); San Bernardino County, California U.S.
- Genres: Soul, funk, jazz
- Occupations: Musician, record producer, songwriter
- Instruments: Bass, keyboards, guitar, sitar, drums, percussion
- Labels: Daptone, Desco

Gabriel Roth (born August 17, 1974), also known as Bosco Mann among other aliases, is an American record producer, musician, and co-founder of Daptone Records. He is best known as the bandleader, bass player, primary songwriter, and producer of Sharon Jones & The Dap-Kings. A prolific recording engineer, he runs Daptone Studios in Brooklyn and Penrose Studios in Riverside, California.

== Background ==
Roth was born on August 17, 1974, in San Bernardino County, California. Gabe and his older sister, Samra, born in 1972, were raised in Riverside by their parents, Andrew and Diane Roth, both of whom practiced law in the community and worked on civil rights and discrimination cases. Roth said his early aspirations were to be a math teacher and that he did not consider a career in the music industry an option.

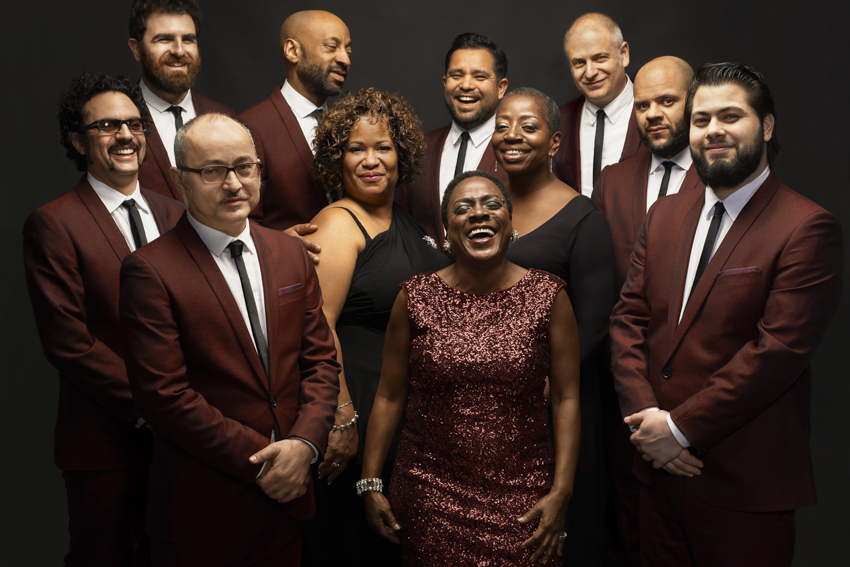
Roth (far left) with Sharon Jones & the Dap-Kings in 2015.

Roth is an outspoken proponent for analog recording, having once said, "Show me a computer that sounds as good as a tape machine and I'll use it."

The distinctive, tinted glasses Roth wears on stage and in interviews are the result of eye injuries he sustained in a 2002 car accident which put him in the hospital for ten days and left him temporarily blind.

== Career ==
After moving to New York City to attend New York University in the 1990s, he met record collector and former label owner Phillipe Lehman. After producing funk tracks together, the two launched the record label Desco Records in 1997. Located in Manhattan, Desco produced limited pressings of Lee Fields, The Sugarman 3, and the earliest Sharon Jones recordings, among other funk and afrobeat records. Roth also played with the label's house band, the Soul Providers, and recorded and wrote material for Antibalas and other bands on the Desco label, often under a pseudonym.

In 1999–2000, Lehman and Roth decided to part ways, with Lehman going to found Soul Fire Records and Roth partnering with The Sugarman 3 saxophonist Neal Sugarman to found Daptone Records. Daptone was home for the new Sharon Jones project, Sharon Jones & the Dap-Kings, of which Roth was producer, primary songwriter, and bassist for the band's nearly twenty-year history.

Mann was the recording engineer for the Thunder Chicken album sessions by The Mighty Imperials. He was present when Joseph Henry, a singer with a shouting style walked into the studio. A year prior to the sessions Henry had cut a single for Daptone Records, "Who’s the King?" which had done quite well on the funk scene. According to Bosco, the band was messing around on a groove when Henry arrived at the studio. Walking straight to the mic., he gave orders to the band to "Keep it just where it is". He had already begun singing before Bosco made it into the control room to press the record button. The song later had horns added to it and it was put on the album as "Soul Buster".

As a recording engineer and producer, Roth has won two Grammy Awards:

Amy Winehouse's acclaimed Back to Black album was recorded with the Dap-Kings at Daptone's House of Soul Studio in Bushwick, Brooklyn in 2006, and in 2012 Booker T. Jones' The Road From Memphis was also recorded there. As a member of Sharon Jones & the Dap-Kings, he was nominated for the 2014 Grammy Award for Best R&B Album for Give the People What They Want.

== Discography ==
Note, as co-label owner of Daptone Records, Roth executive produces every record released on the label with Neil Sugarman.

With Sharon Jones & the Dap-Kings

- Dap Dippin' with Sharon Jones and the Dap-Kings (2002)
- Naturally (2005)
- 100 Days, 100 Nights (2007)
- I Learned the Hard Way (2010)
- Give the People What They Want (2014)
- It's a Holiday Soul Party (2015)
- Soul of a Woman (2017)
