= Give the People What They Want (Sharon Jones & the Dap-Kings album) =

Studio album by Sharon Jones & the Dap-Kings
- Released: January 14, 2014
- Genres: Soul, funk
- Length: 33:38
- Label: Daptone

Sharon Jones & the Dap-Kings chronology
| I Learned the Hard Way (2010) | Give the People What They Want (2014) | It's a Holiday Soul Party (2015) |

Singles from Give the People What They Want
- 1. "Retreat!" Released: May 7, 2013

Give the People What They Want is the fifth studio album by American soul and funk band Sharon Jones & the Dap-Kings, released January 14, 2014, on Daptone Records. The album was nominated for Best R&B Album at the 57th Annual Grammy Awards.

== Critical reception ==
Professional ratings
Aggregate scores
| Source | Rating |
|---|---|
| Metacritic | 80/100 |
Review scores
| Source | Rating |
| AllMusic | 4/5 stars |
| The A.V. Club | B+ |
| The Guardian | 4/5 stars |
| The Independent | 4/5 stars |
| NME | 7/10 |
| PopMatters | 6/10 |
| Rolling Stone | 3.5/5 stars |
| Slant Magazine | 3.5/5 stars |
| Spin | 7/10 |
| USA Today | 3.5/4 stars |

Give the People What They Want received positive reception from music critics. At the review aggregator website Metacritic, which assigns a weighted average score based on independent reviews, the album scored an 80/100 based on 31 selected ratings, indicating "generally favorable" reviews. At The A.V. Club, Annie Zaleski noted that the album is not a "rehash of the past—or a collection that panders." Will Hermes, writing for Rolling Stone, stated that the band is "extending and preserving tradition; it remains a national treasure and an instant soul party." At Spin, Anupa Mistry affirmed, "The point is that music from another time can still thrill us in this one because of its practically tyrannical insistence on bliss." Ben Cardow of NME commented, "Rarely has reliability been this funky". At Slant Magazine, Kyle Fowle wrote that the music here is "reveling in a variety of musical tones, from confident, strutting anthems of independence to slow-burning, intimate ballads, but also displays Jones at her most vocally ferocious, lending a self-assured voice to the down and out."

At AllMusic, Fred Thomas noted, "These ten songs sound almost designed to be played on repeat, and keep with the always colorful and ecstatically fun sound audiences have come to expect from one of the best acts going in retrofitted classic soul." Elysa Gardner of USA Today commented that "her mighty voice and spirit undiminished" on which is "matched by the Dap-Kings' old-school R&B dynamism, and by the gritty, groovy indomitability conveyed in their new songs." At The Independent, Andy Gill affirmed that this release is "as good an R&B album as any in recent years." Maddy Costa, writing for The Guardian, alluded to how the release "breathes passionate new life into the past." However, PopMatters Zachary Houle cautioned that the album "is a quasi-holding pattern and is middling in its success".

== Track listing ==
| No. | Title | Writer(s) | Length |
|---|---|---|---|
| 1. | "Retreat!" | Bosco Mann | 3:31 |
| 2. | "Stranger to My Happiness" | Mann | 3:31 |
| 3. | "We Get Along" | Joe Crispiano, Homer Steinweiss | 3:03 |
| 4. | "You'll Be Lonely" | Cochemea Gastelum | 3:45 |
| 5. | "Now I See" | Steinweiss | 3:10 |
| 6. | "Making Up and Breaking Up (And Making Up and Breaking Up Over Again)" | Mann | 2:23 |
| 7. | "Get Up and Get Out" | Steinweiss | 3:27 |
| 8. | "Long Time, Wrong Time" | Gastelum | 3:21 |
| 9. | "People Don't Get What They Deserve" | Mann | 3:25 |
| 10. | "Slow Down, Love" | Mann | 4:02 |
| Total length: | | | 33:38 |

The CD package includes a code for a free MP3 download of the album, which adds a 58-minute Daptone Records sampler.

== Personnel ==
- Sharon Jones - vocals
- Homer Steinweiss - drums
- Binky Griptite - guitars
- Joseph M. Crispiano - guitars
- Bosco Mann - bass, guitars, orchestral chimes, organ, tambourine, vibraphone
- Neal Sugarman - tenor saxophone, piano
- Cochemea Gastelum - baritone saxophone
- Dave Guy - trumpet, bass
- Fernando "Boogaloo" Velez - tambourine, congas

Additional Musicians

- Aaron Johnson - trombone (tracks 1, 2, 5, 9)
- Victor Axelrod - Farfisa organ (tracks 1, 2), orchestral chimes (track 1), glockenspiel (track 1), Wurlitzer electric piano (track 3)
- Jimi "Popcorn" Ashes - timpani (tracks 1, 5, 9)
- Jordan McLean - trumpet (track 1)
- The Dapettes - background vocals

== Charts ==
=== Weekly charts ===
| Chart (2014) | Peak position |
|---|---|
| Austrian Albums (Ö3 Austria) | 47 |
| Belgian Albums (Ultratop Flanders) | 27 |
| Belgian Albums (Ultratop Wallonia) | 84 |
| Dutch Albums (Album Top 100) | 28 |
| French Albums (SNEP) | 116 |
| German Albums (Offizielle Top 100) | 79 |
| UK Independent Albums (Official Charts) | 13 |
| UK R&B Albums (Official Charts) | 14 |
| US Billboard 200 | 22 |
| US Independent Albums (Billboard) | 1 |
| US Top R&B/Hip-Hop Albums (Billboard) | 6 |

=== Year-end charts ===
| Chart (2014) | Position |
|---|---|
| US Top R&B/Hip-Hop Albums (Billboard) | 76 |
