= The Exciting Sounds of Menahan Street Band =

- One of two covers to the album: the other features four nude women with snakes wrapped around them, posed around a piano

Studio album by Menahan Street Band
- Released: February 26, 2021
- Studio: The Diamond Mine, Long Island City, New York, US; The Sound Factory, Hollywood, California, US
- Genre: Funk; soul
- Length: 37:50
- Label: Dunham
- Producer: Tommy "TNT" Brenneck

Menahan Street Band chronology
The Crossing (2012)	The Exciting Sounds of Menahan Street Band (2021)

The Exciting Sounds of Menahan Street Band is the third full-length studio album by American rhythm and blues group Menahan Street Band.

== Reception ==
Editors at AllMusic rated this album 3.5 out of 5 stars, with critic Mark Deming writing the "music frequently plays like a collection of soundtrack pieces to forgotten movies and television shows of the '70s" and "the vintage-style compositions, arrangements, and production are almost spooky in their accuracy". In Spill Magazine, Gerrod Harris gave this album a 4 out of 5, calling it "a sound that could set the tone and atmosphere of a Tarantino film" that has "a complete vibe that while founded on nostalgia and reminiscing for the past, is driven by excellent musicianship and strong songwriting". In a 7 out of 10 review for Under the Radar, Mark Moody called The Exciting Sounds of Menahan Street Band "a cohesive listen" while criticizing some tracks as weaker than others.

== Track listing ==
1. "Midnight Morning" (Thomas Brenneck, Dave Guy, Leon Michels, and Homer Steinweiss) – 2:57
2. "Rainy Day Lady" (Brenneck, Guy, Michels, and Steinweiss) – 3:18
3. "The Starchaser" (Brenneck, Guy, Michels, Nick Movshon, and Steinweiss) – 2:48
4. "Silkworm" (Brenneck, Guy, Michels, Movshon, and Steinweiss) – 3:17
5. "Cabin Fever" (Brenneck, Guy, Michels, Movshon, and Steinweiss) – 2:37
6. "Rising Dawn" (Brenneck, Guy, Michels, and Steinweiss) – 2:15
7. "Glovebox Pistol" (Brenneck, Guy, Michels, and Steinweiss) – 1:08
8. "Queens Highway" (Brenneck, Guy, Michels, Movshon, and Steinweiss) – 1:07
9. "Snow Day" (Brenneck, Guy, Michels, Movshon, and Steinweiss) – 4:00
10. "Parlor Trick" (Brenneck, Daniel Foder, Guy, Michels, and Brian Profilio) – 1:36
11. "The Duke" (Brenneck, Adam Feeney, Guy, Michels, Movshon, and Steinweiss) – 2:46
12. "Stepping Through Shadow"(Brenneck) – 2:01
13. "Devil’s Respite"(Brenneck, Guy, Michels, and Steinweiss) – 3:51
14. "There Was a Man"(Brenneck, Guy, Michels, Movshon, and Steinweiss) – 4:09

== Personnel ==
Menahen Street Band

- Thomas Brenneck – bass guitar, guitar, Mini Moog, organ, percussion, piano, engineering, mixing
- Mike Deller – organ, piano
- Dave Guy – trumpet, guitar, tambourine
- Leon Michels – tenor saxophone, organ, percussion
- Nick Movshon – bass, drums
- Homer Steinweiss – drums

Additional personnel

- Mike Deller – Farfisa organ on "The Duke"
- Daniel Foder – bass guitar on "Parlor Trick"
- Daniel Gneiding – lettering
- JJ Golden – mastering
- Simon Guzman – tape operation
- Jens Jungkurth – engineering
- Todd Malconfone – engineering
- Bosco Mann – bass guitar on "Midnight Morning"
- Ray Mason – trombone on "The Duke"
- Ariana Papademetropoulos – art direction, photography
- Brian Profilio – drums on "Parlor Trick"
- Elizabeth Pupo-Walker – congas on "The Starchaser"
- Ray Mason – trombone
- Gabriel Roth – mixing, executive production
- Neal Sugarman – executive production

== See also ==
- List of 2021 albums
