= The Crossing (Menahan Street Band album) =

Studio album by Menahan Street Band
- Released: October 30, 2012
- Studios: Dunham Sound, Brooklyn, New York City, New York, United States
- Genres: Funk; soul
- Length: 38:43
- Label: Daptone/Dunham
- Producer: Thomas Brenneck

Menahan Street Band chronology
Make the Road by Walking (2008)	The Crossing (2012)	The Exciting Sounds of Menahan Street Band (2021)

The Crossing is the second full-length studio album by American rhythm and blues group Menahan Street Band. It has received positive reviews from critics.

== Reception ==
According to the review aggregator Metacritic, The Crossing received "generally favorable reviews" based on a weighted average score of 79 out of 100 from 10 critic scores. Editors at AllMusic rated this album 4 out of 5 stars, with critic Fred Thomas writing that this album "expands somewhat on the band's debut, with the group plucking inspiration from a wide spectrum of soul and funk subcategories" and the band "cultivates a rich collection of emotionally complex instrumental soul, with precise musicianship meeting inspired production and a deeply studied obsession with the often sampled and less often acknowledged obscure geniuses of soul music". Len Comaratta of Consequence of Sound scored this album a B, noting the band's non-soul influences and states that a "slightly haunting, lower-timbre" runs through most of the album. In The Irish Times, Jim Carroll gave The Crossing 4 out of 5 stars, characterizing the music: "these tight, moody, sumptuous instrumentals are widescreen, cinematic pace-setters, with detailed, punchy, textured playing that draws you in and allows the drama to unfold". Elias Leight of PopMatters gave this release an 8 out of 10, stating that this work "once again shows their talent at creating tight instrumental funk" with music "buoyed by firm backbeats and highly synchronized horn section".

== Track listing ==
All songs written by Menahan Street Band.

1. "The Crossing" – 5:04
2. "Lights Out" – 2:35
3. "Keep Coming Back" – 3:16
4. "Three Faces" – 4:34
5. "Sleight of Hand" – 3:00
6. "Everyday a Dream" – 3:51
7. "Seven Is the Wind" – 5:06
8. "Bullet for the Bagman" – 2:57
9. "Driftwood" – 3:39
10. "Ivory and Blue" – 3:36
11. "Ivory and Blue (reprise)" – 1:05

== Personnel ==
Menahan Street Band

- Thomas Brenneck – autoharp, bass guitar, guitar, electric piano, synthesizer, ukulele, mixing, production
- Mike Deller – piano
- Dave Guy – trumpet
- Leon Michels – organ, tenor saxophone
- Nick Movshon – bass guitar, drums
- Homer Steinweiss – drums, package design

Additional personnel

- Victor Axelrod – organ
- The Bushwick Philharmonic – philharmonic orchestra on "Lights Out"
  - Antoine Silverman – violin
  - Entcho Todorov – violin
  - Anja Wood – viola
- John Carbonella – package design
- Bobby Chupete – congas on "Ivory and Blue"
- Cochemea Gastelum – flute on "Sleight of Hand"
- JJ Golden – mastering
- Gabriel Roth – executive production, mixing
- Sugarman – executive production
- Jared Tankel – baritone saxophone on "Sleight of Hand"

== See also ==
- 2012 in American music
- List of 2012 albums
