= Electrophonic Chronic =

Studio album by the Arcs
- Released: January 27, 2023
- Studio: Easy Eye Sound (Nashville); Electric Lady (Manhattan); Diamond Mine (Queens, New York); Dunham Sound Studios (Brooklyn)
- Length: 38:45
- Label: Easy Eye Sound
- Producer: Dan Auerbach; Leon Michels

The Arcs chronology
Yours, Dreamily, (2015)	Electrophonic Chronic (2023)

Singles from Electrophonic Chronic
- 1. "Keep on Dreamin'" Released: October 13, 2022; 2. "Heaven Is a Place" Released: November 10, 2022; 3. "Eyez" Released: December 8, 2022; 4. "Sunshine" Released: January 12, 2023

Electrophonic Chronic is the second studio album by the Arcs, a side project of Dan Auerbach of the Black Keys. It was released on January 27, 2023, under Auerbach's label Easy Eye Sound.

== Recording ==
A second album was initially conceived by the Arcs following the release of their debut album Yours, Dreamily, (2015); however, this did not materialize. Electrophonic Chronic features the original lineup of the band and was recorded primarily prior to Richard Swift's death in 2018. Recording took place at Auerbach's Easy Eye Sound studios in Nashville, Electric Lady Studios in Manhattan, and Leon Michels' Diamond Mine Studio in Queens, New York. It was co-produced by Auerbach and Michels. The album was announced by the band on October 13, 2022, coinciding with the release of the lead single "Keep on Dreamin'".

== Release and promotion ==
The album's first single "Keep on Dreamin'" was released simultaneously with the album announcement on October 13, 2022. A second single, "Heaven Is a Place", was released on November 10, 2022, along with a visualizer directed by Roboshobo that pays tribute to Swift. A third single, "Eyez", was released on December 8, 2022, along with a visualizer for it directed by Roboshobo. A fourth and final single, "Sunshine", was released on January 12, 2023. A music video for "Sunshine" directed by Roboshobo followed on January 23, 2023.

The band has no plans to tour in support of Electrophonic Chronic or to record new music. Commenting on the band's period of creativity with Swift and David Berman, Leon Michels said, "It was almost like this insane manic creative energy that was unsustainable. That's why we recorded so much music. We were trying to basically capture this feeling that can't sustain itself."

== Critical reception ==
Professional ratings
Aggregate scores
Source	Rating
Metacritic	82/100
Review scores
Source	Rating
AllMusic	3.5/5 stars
American Songwriter	4/5 stars
Clash	8/10
Far Out	4/5 stars
Hot Press	8/10
Mojo	4/5 stars
The Observer	4/5 stars
Uncut	8/10

Electrophonic Chronic received universal acclaim from music critics. At Metacritic, which assigns a normalized rating out of 100 to reviews from professional publications, the album received an average score of 82, based on 7 reviews.

Bud Scoppa of Uncut gave the album an 8 out of 10 rating, writing, "Auerbach's stoic, close-mic'd vocals and gnarled tendrils of distorted guitar bring a devastating immediacy to an album that contemplates the death of love and, by extension, mortality itself, seeking closure." Christopher Connor of Clash wrote, "Worth the wait for fans. The record balances its psychedelia with more mediative moments offering plenty of variety. This record again shows Auerbach's musical influences and projects beyond The Black Keys." Stephen Thomas Erlewine of AllMusic wrote, "Electrophonic Chronic plays like an old-fashioned long-player instead of a stack of 45s, a heady experience that nevertheless is anchored in R&B. Maybe the thrills aren't as immediate as they are on Yours, Dreamily, yet the free-floating psychedelic soul is alluring, as well as a worthy tribute to Swift."

== Track listing ==
Electrophonic Chronic track listing
No.	Title	Writer(s)	Length
1.	"Keep on Dreamin'"	Dan Auerbach; Leon Michels; Richard Swift	4:26
2.	"Eyez"	Auerbach; Michels; Nick Movshon; Homer Steinweiss; Swift	3:40
3.	"Heaven Is a Place"	Auerbach; Michels; Steinweiss	4:49
4.	"Califone Interlude"	Auerbach; Michels; Movshon; Russ Pahl; Steinweiss	1:16
5.	"River"	Auerbach; Michels; Swift	3:27
6.	"Sunshine"	Auerbach; Michels; Steinweiss; Swift	2:56
7.	"A Man Will Do Wrong"	Willie Clarke; Clarence Reid	4:17
8.	"Behind the Eyes"	Auerbach; Michels; Movshon; Pahl; Steinweiss	4:09
9.	"Backstage Mess"	Auerbach; Michels; Movshon; Steinweiss; Swift	1:47
10.	"Sporting Girls Interlude"		0:17
11.	"Love Doesn't Live Here Anymore"	Auerbach; Michels; Steinweiss	3:45
12.	"Only One for Me"	Auerbach; David Berman; Michels; Swift	3:56
Total length:			38:45

== Personnel ==
The Arcs

- Dan Auerbach – lead vocals (1–3, 5–9, 11, 12), acoustic guitar (1, 7–9, 11), electric guitar (1–9, 11), bass (1, 3, 5, 11, 12), background vocals (2), fuzz bass (8), percussion (8)
- Leon Michels – Ace Tone (1, 2, 5, 6), Hammond B3 (1, 3, 5–9, 11, 12), synthesizer (1–3, 7, 11), horns (1, 6, 7), background vocals (2), Rhodes (3), piano (4, 6, 11), flute (9, 12), Mellotron (11), glockenspiel (12)
- Nick Movshon – bass (2, 4, 6–9)
- Homer Steinweiss – drums (2–4, 6–9, 11), percussion (4, 11)
- Richard Swift – drums (1, 5, 11, 12), background Vocals (1, 5–7, 9, 11), percussion (6, 11)

Additional musicians

- Shawn Camp – fiddle (4)
- Russ Pahl – steel guitar (4, 8)
- Sam Bacco – percussion (5–7), congas (6)
- Shae Fiol – background vocals (5, 6)
- Mireya Ramos – background vocals (5, 6)
- Hiroko Taguchi – violin (5, 12)
- Garo Yellin – cello (5, 12)
- Ray Mason – horns (6, 7)
- Thomas Brenneck – electric guitar (7)

Technical

- Dan Auerbach – production
- Leon Michels – production
- M. Allen Parker – engineering
- Ben Baptie – engineering
- Collin Dupuis – engineering
- Patrick Damphier – engineering
- Ken Takahashi – engineering
- Joe Visciano – engineering
- Phil Joly – engineering
- Caleb VanBuskirk – engineering
- McKinley James – additional engineering
- Tyler Zwiep – additional engineering
- Jonny Ullman – additional engineering
- Tchad Blake – mixing
- Greg Calbi – mastering
- Steve Fallone – mastering

Packaging

- Perry Shall – design, layout
- Omar "El Oms" Juarez – illustrations

== Charts ==
Chart performance for Electrophonic Chronic
Chart (2023)	Peak position
German Albums (Offizielle Top 100)	90
Swiss Albums (Schweizer Hitparade)	57
UK Album Downloads (OCC)	49
