= No Time for Dreaming =

Studio album by Charles Bradley
- Released: January 25, 2011
- Genres: Soul; funk
- Length: 48:54
- Labels: Daptone; Dunham
- Producer: Thomas Brenneck

Charles Bradley chronology
No Time for Dreaming (2011)	Victim of Love (2013)

Singles from No Time for Dreaming
- 1. "The World (Is Going Up In Flames)" Released: December 14, 2010; 2. "Heart of Gold" Released: May 3, 2011

No Time for Dreaming is the debut studio album by American soul singer Charles Bradley. It was released on January 25, 2011, by Daptone Records and Dunham Records.

== Singles ==
The album's first single, "The World (Is Going Up In Flames)", was released on December 14, 2010. The album's second single, "Heart of Gold", was released on May 3, 2011. It is a cover of Canadian singer-songwriter Neil Young's "Heart of Gold".

== Critical reception ==
Professional ratings
Aggregate scores
Source	Rating
AnyDecentMusic?	6.5/10
Metacritic	79/100
Review scores
Source	Rating
AllMusic	4/5 stars
Blurt	8/10
Consequence	C−
Now	4/5
Paste	8.4/10
PopMatters	8/10
Prefix Magazine	8.5/10
Tiny Mix Tapes	3/5

No Time for Dreaming was met with generally positive reviews. At Metacritic, which assigns a normalized rating out of 100 to reviews from mainstream publications, the album received an average score of 79, based on 14 reviews. Aggregator AnyDecentMusic? gave it 6.5 out of 10, based on their assessment of the critical consensus.

Hal Horowitz of AllMusic said, "Retro-soul aficionados who claim they don't make 'em like they used to will obviously be thrilled with this, but even contemporary R&B fans can't help but be moved by the emotion and passion evident in every note of this riveting set". Benjamin Boles of Now said, "While it took a little while for the magic to finally get laid down to tape, the results are worth the wait". Mike Madden of PopMatters said, "You don't need to know his back story to fall in love with Bradley—the music speaks for itself. This album has been a looooong time coming, but it's more than worth the wait". Max Blau of Paste said, "No Time for Dreaming not only prevails as a defining culmination of Bradley's lifelong musicianship to date, but also furthers the argument that Daptone Records can do no wrong".

Josh Modell of Spin said, "No Time for Dreaming wails in a world of "Heartaches and Pain" (see the memorable closing track), but Bradley's despair is never less than stirring". J. Arthur Bloom of Tiny Mix Tapes said, "The Menahan Street Band realizes the vision of No Time for Dreaming, with Brenneck at the helm. More Memphis than Detroit, they're always present but never pretentious". Phil Johnson of The Independent said, "Bradley, a 62-year-old ex-plumber and James Brown impersonator, has a raspy, infinitely pained voice but there doesn't appear to be any real interaction between him and the band".

Mojo placed the album at number 40 on its list of "Top 50 albums of 2011".

== Track listing ==
All songs feature Menahan Street Band.

No Time for Dreaming track listing
No.	Title	Writer(s)	Length
1.	"The World (Is Going Up in Flames)"	Charles Bradley; Thomas Brenneck; Mike Deller; Leon Michels	3:22
2.	"The Telephone Song"	Brenneck; Dave Guy; Michels; Homer Steinweiss; Fernando Velez	3:48
3.	"Golden Rule"	Bradley; Brenneck; Michels; Nick Movshon; Steinweiss	3:29
4.	"I Believe in Your Love"	Bradley; Brenneck; Michels	3:54
5.	"Trouble in the Land"	Brenneck; Michels	1:02
6.	"Lovin' You, Baby"	Bradley; Brenneck	5:27
7.	"No Time for Dreaming"	Joe Quarterman	2:52
8.	"How Long"	Bradley; Brenneck; Guy; Michels; Steinweiss	3:54
9.	"In You (I Found a Love)"	Bradley; Brenneck; Michels	3:21
10.	"Why Is It So Hard"	Bradley; Brenneck; Michels; Steinweiss	4:09
11.	"Since Our Last Goodbye"	Brenneck; Michels; Steinweiss	4:16
12.	"Heartaches and Pain"	Bradley; Brenneck	2:56
13.	"Heart of Gold"	Neil Young	3:03
14.	"Stay Away"	Kurt Cobain	3:11

== Charts ==
Chart performance for No Time for Dreaming
Chart (2011–2013)	Peak position
Belgian Albums (Ultratop Flanders)	36
Belgian Albums (Ultratop Wallonia)	175
Danish Albums (Hitlisten)	24
Dutch Albums (Album Top 100)	34
Swiss Albums (Schweizer Hitparade)	66
US Heatseekers Albums (Billboard)	37
