= Nick Movshon =

- Born: Nicholas Anthony Movshon; March 17, 1982 (age 44); Manhattan, New York, U.S.
- Genres: R&B, soul, pop, alternative rock
- Occupations: Musician, record producer
- Instruments: Bass; drums; guitar; percussion; vocals
- Years active: 1999–present
- Labels: Truth and Soul Records; Dunham Records; Daptone Records; Big Crown Records
- Member of: Menahan Street Band; El Michels Affair; The Arcs; Lee Field & The Expressions
- Formerly of: Antibalas

Nicholas Anthony Movshon (born March 17, 1982) is an American bass guitarist, drummer and songwriter, best known for his considerable contributions to the New York funk and soul revival. A frequent contributor to the recorded output of Brooklyn-based labels Daptone Records and Truth & Soul, he has spent the past two decades playing with Charles Bradley, Lee Fields, and Sharon Jones & the Dap-Kings, and as a member of groups including Antibalas, Menahan Street Band, and El Michels Affair. He is also a founding member of The Arcs and has toured with The Black Keys.

A prolific session musician, he often works with producers Mark Ronson (Amy Winehouse; "Valerie," "Back to Black"), Dan Auerbach (Lana Del Rey, Yola), and Leon Michels (Aloe Blacc; "I Need a Dollar"). He can be heard playing on tracks like Bruno Mars' "Locked Out of Heaven".

== History ==
Movshon began his career as a teenager playing in the band The Mighty Imperials with longtime collaborators Leon Michels, Homer Steinweiss, and Thomas Brenneck. The band released music on Desco Records, a predecessor of seminal soul labels Daptone and Soul Fire, and soon was working as songwriters and sessions musicians for the latter. He joined Brooklyn Afrobeat ensemble Antibalas in the early 2000s and was soon a member of Michels' El Michels Affair and Brenneck's Menahan Street Band. Among other soul and funk bands affiliated with Truth & Soul Records and Daptone Records, Movshon is also a longtime member of Lee Field & The Expressions and has played with Charles Bradley and Sharon Jones & The Dap-Kings.

While sitting in with The Dap-Kings in the 2000s, Movshon got to know Mark Ronson who was producing Amy Winehouse's record Back to Black with the group. He played bass on much of the record and would go on play on many other Mark Ronson productions since, often forming a rhythm section with Steinweiss. In 2010, Movshon and Michels toured with The Black Keys. A few years later, they joined Dan Auerbach along with Steinweiss and Richard Swift to form The Arcs; The Arcs released their album Yours, Dreamily, in 2015. Over the past two decades, Movshon has also played with artists like Brooklyn art-rockers TV on the Radio and hip-hop group The Wu Tang Clan.

In 2014, Movshon built the Long Island City recording studio The Diamond Mine with Brenneck, Michels, and Steinweiss.

The bass he is mostly known for using is a vintage Gibson Ripper.

Movshon lives in New York City.

== Discography ==
With The Mighty Imperials

- Thunder Chicken (2001)

With Antibalas

- Who is This America? (2004)
- Government Magic EP (2005)
- Security (2007)

With El Michels Affair

- Sounding Out The City (2005)
- Walk On By (A Tribute To Isaac Hayes) EP (2009)
- Enter The 37th Chamber (2010)
- Loose Change EP (2014)
- Return To The 37th Chamber (2016)
- Adult Themes (2020)
- Yeti Season (2021)

With Menahan Street Band

- Make the Road by Walking (2008)
- The Crossing (2012)
- The Exciting Sounds of Menahan Street Band (2021)

With Bronx River Parkway

- San Sebastian 152 (with Candela All Stars) (2008)

With Lee Field & The Expressions

- My World (2009)
- Faithful Man (2012)
- Emma Jean (2014)
- Special Night (2016)
- It Rains Love (2019)
- Big Crown Vaults Vol. 1 (2020)

With Mark Ronson & the Business Intl.

- Record Collection (2010)

With Charles Bradley (as part of the Menahan Street Band)

- No Time For Dreaming (2011)
- Victim of Love (2013)
- Changes (2016)
- Black Velvet (2018)

With The Fabulous Three

- The Best Of The Fabulous Three (2014)

With The Arcs

- Yours, Dreamily, (2015)
- The Arcs vs. The Inventors Vol. I EP (2015)

With The Olympians

- The Olympians (2016)

== Other credits ==
Selected credits. Bass guitar credit unless otherwise noted.

- Amy Winehouse – Back to Black (2006)
  - "Rehab"
  - "You Know I'm No Good"
  - "Back to Black"
  - "Love Is a Losing Game"
  - "Wake Up Alone"
  - "He Can Only Hold Her"
- Mark Ronson – Version (2007)
  - "Valerie" (featuring Amy Winehouse)
  - "The Only One I Know" (featuring Robbie Williams)
- Adele – 19 (2008)
  - "Right as Rain" (songwriting credit only)
- Aloe Blacc – Good Things (2010)
  - Credited on all album tracks for drums, bass, guitar including on:
  - "I Need a Dollar"
  - "Green Lights"
  - "Loving You Is Killing Me"
- Amy Winehouse – Lioness: Hidden Treasures (2011)
  - "Will You Still Love Me Tomorrow?"
  - "Valerie" ('68 version)
- Bruno Mars – Unorthodox Jukebox (2012)
  - "Locked Out of Heaven"
- Lana Del Rey – Ultraviolence (2014)
  - "Cruel World"
  - "Ultraviolence"
  - "Shades of Cool"
  - "Brooklyn Baby"
  - "West Coast"
  - "Sad Girl"; drums
  - "Money Power Glory"
  - "The Other Woman"; drums
  - "Florida Kilos"; drums
- Mark Ronson – Uptown Special (2015)
  - "Feel Right" (featuring Mystikal); also songwriter
  - "I Can't Lose" (featuring Keyone Starr)
  - "In Case of Fire" (featuring Jeff Bhasker); also songwriter
- Lady Gaga – Joanne (2016)
  - "Sinner's Prayer"
  - "Hey Girl" (featuring Florence Welch)
- Mark Ronson – Late Night Feelings (2019)
  - "Knock Knock Knock" (featuring Yebba); also songwriter
  - "When U Went Away" (featuring Yebba); also songwriter
  - "Truth" (featuring Alicia Keys and The Last Artful, Dodgr); also songwriter
  - "Why Hide" (featuring Diana Gordon); also songwriter
- Harry Styles – Fine Line (2019)
  - "Treat People with Kindness"
- Aaron Frazer – Introducing... (2021)
- Yebba – Dawn (2021)
- Yola – Stand for Myself (2021)
  - "Stand"; songwriter
- Alice Ivy and Sycco – "Weakness" (2021)
- Norah Jones – I Dream of Christmas (2021)
- Michael Leonhart & JSWISS – Bona Fide (2022)
  - "Bona Fide"; drums
  - "Defeat"; drums
  - "What’s Love"; drums
  - "Elegance”; drums
  - "Make Room"; drums
- Lady Wray – Piece of Me (2022)

=== Film Soundtrack ===
Song	Year	Album	Co-Artist(s)
"Grandma Calls the Boy Bad News"	2025	F1 the Album	Rachel Keen, Mark Ronson, Christopher Braun, Homer Steinweiss, Victor Axelrod
