= Victim of Love (Charles Bradley album) =

Studio album by Charles Bradley
- Released: April 2, 2013
- Genre: Soul
- Length: 40:24
- Labels: Daptone; Dunham
- Producer: Thomas Brenneck

Charles Bradley chronology
No Time for Dreaming (2011)	Victim of Love (2013)	Changes (2016)

Singles from Victim of Love
- 1. "Strictly Reserved for You" Released: January 29, 2013

Victim of Love is the second studio album by American soul singer Charles Bradley. It was released on April 2, 2013, by Daptone Records and Dunham Records.

== Critical reception ==
Professional ratings
Aggregate scores
Source	Rating
AnyDecentMusic?	7.7/10
Metacritic	81/100
Review scores
Source	Rating
AllMusic	4/5 stars
Blurt	4/5 stars
Consequence	C+
The Guardian	4/5 stars
musicOMH	4/5 stars
Paste	8.4/10
Pitchfork	6.8/10
PopMatters	8/10
Rolling Stone	3.5/5 stars
Under the Radar	8/10

Victim of Love was met with widespread critical acclaim. At Metacritic, which assigns a normalized rating out of 100 to reviews from mainstream publications, the album received an average score of 81, based on 20 reviews. Aggregator AnyDecentMusic? gave it 7.7 out of 10, based on their assessment of the critical consensus.

Thom Jurek of AllMusic said, "Victim of Love showcases growth—and a sound not heard before on Daptone—while not straying from the gritty soul that established the singer; it is every bit as strong as its predecessor and more diverse". Jennifer Kelly of Blurt said, "Bradley and his band are such great interpreters and expanders of the soul tradition that you don't mind the nagging feeling that you've heard these cuts before". Michael Madden of Consequence said, "It's pretty uniformly vintage-soul stuff—barreling horns, wafting backing vocals, single guitar chords on the upbeat—but it never sounds antiquated". Ryan B. Patrick of Exclaim! said, "Victim of Love is meant to be taken literally; it's a rare and continued opportunity for a sexagenarian to finally get his chance in the soulful sun. Something the album proves that he's both appreciative of and not taking lightly". Alexis Petridis of The Guardian said, "Its quality never falters over the album's 40 minutes, from Let Love Stand a Chance's gorgeous swoon to Where Do We Go From Here's tense funk".

Nate Chinen of The New York Times said, "The new album is a little less pointed [than his debut], and a good deal less surprising. But Mr. Bradley, once again wailing against the convincing grit of Menahan Street Band, sounds bolstered by all the touring he has done over the last two years". James Reed of The Boston Globe said, "You hear him at the peak of his powers on the title track, whose acoustic soul reels in the band and lets Bradley tell his story, one wounded sentiment at a time". Andrew Burgess of musicOMH said, "He's lived it long and hard, and with this album Bradley continues to lay out all the goodness and badness of life and love, with soul to spare". Ryan Bort of Paste said, "If you were a fan of No Time for Dreaming you're going to be a fan of Victim of Love, and you shouldn't really need to know anything about it other than it's an album full of Charles Bradley songs". Dean Van Nguyen of Pitchfork said, "Victim of Love is ultimately a less successful record than No Time for Dreaming. For one, Bradley seems less connected with this set". Brent Faulkner of PopMatters said, "Victim of Love is best described as classic and authentic without feeling anachronistic in the least". Jody Rosen of Rolling Stone said, "It's Bradley's voice that seals the deal". Laura Studarus of Under the Radar said, "An album for the ages".

== Track listing ==
Victim of Love track listing
No.	Title	Writer(s)	Length
1.	"Strictly Reserved for You"	Charles Bradley; Thomas Brenneck; Adam Feeney	3:43
2.	"You Put the Flame on It"	Bradley; Brenneck; David Guy; Leon Michels; Nick Movshon	3:48
3.	"Let Love Stand a Chance"	Bradley; Brenneck	3:59
4.	"Victim of Love"	Bradley; Brenneck	3:29
5.	"Love Bug Blues"	Brenneck; Guy; Michels; Movshon; Homer Steinweiss; Holland–Dozier–Holland	3:00
6.	"Dusty Blue"	Victor Axelrod; Brenneck; Guy; Michels; Movshon; Steinweiss	3:21
7.	"Confusion"	Bradley; Brenneck; Guy; Michels	3:44
8.	"Where Do We Go from Here"	Bradley; Brenneck; Feeney; Guy; Daniel Foder; Michels; Steinweiss	3:11
9.	"Crying in the Chapel"	Bradley; Brenneck	3:54
10.	"Hurricane"	Bradley; Brenneck; Michael Deller; Guy; Michels; Movshon; Steinweiss	3:32
11.	"Through the Storm"	Bradley; Brenneck	4:42

Note

- All writing credits are taken from LP back cover

== Personnel ==
- Charles Bradley – vocals
- Menahan Street Band – featured artist

Additional personnel

- Kisha Bari – back cover photo
- Thomas Brenneck – engineer, mixing engineer, producer
- JJ Golden – mastering engineer
- Catherine Orchard – design
- Gabriel Roth – executive producer, mixing engineer
- Homer Steinweiss – design
- Sugarman – executive producer
- Elizabeth Weinberg – cover photo
- Ron Wolf – Egg shaker – "Strictly Reserved for You" (one take)

== Charts ==
=== Weekly charts ===
Chart performance for Victim of Love
Chart (2013)	Peak position
Belgian Albums (Ultratop Flanders)	6
Belgian Albums (Ultratop Wallonia)	103
Dutch Albums (Album Top 100)	9
French Albums (SNEP)	100
German Albums (Offizielle Top 100)	98
US Billboard 200	130
US Top R&B/Hip-Hop Albums (Billboard)	17

=== Year-end charts ===
2013 year-end chart performance for Victim of Love
Chart (2013)	Position
Belgian Albums (Ultratop Flanders)	56

2014 year-end chart performance for Victim of Love
Chart (2014)	Position
Belgian Albums (Ultratop Flanders)	138
