= Leon Michels =

American musician (born 1982)

- Also known as: El Michels; Truth & Soul; Otis Youngblood
- Born: Leon Marcus Michels; 1982 (age 43–44); New York, New York, U.S.
- Instruments: Saxophone; guitar; piano; flute
- Years active: 1999–present
- Labels: Truth & Soul; Big Crown Records
- Member of: El Michels Affair; The Arcs; Menahan Street Band
- Formerly of: Sharon Jones & the Dap-Kings
- Website: elmichelsaffair.com

Leon Marcus Michels (/ˈmaɪkəls/; born 1982) is an American music producer, record executive, songwriter, and multi-instrumentalist best known as the leader of the eclectic soul project El Michels Affair and co-founder of Truth & Soul Records and Big Crown Records. He is a founding member of soul and funk bands Sharon Jones & The Dap-Kings, Menahan Street Band, and Lee Fields & The Expressions, and has played with Charles Bradley as well as Wu-Tang Clan. A frequent collaborator of Dan Auerbach, Michels was a touring member of The Black Keys and co-founded The Arcs. As a producer, Michels has produced records for artists such as Norah Jones, Clairo, Kali Uchis, Lady Wray, and Chicano Batman.

== History ==
Michels' professional career began as a teenager in the late 1990s. He got his start playing in the high school funk band The Mighty Imperials with Thomas Brenneck, Nick Movshon, Sean Solomon, and Homer Steinweiss, which soon found a home at the small Desco Records label, the precursor to Soul Fire and Daptone Records. At age sixteen, Michels and Steinweiss joined Desco's house band The Soul Providers and toured internationally as part of Sharon Jones' band.

When Desco folded in 1999, The Mighty Imperials became the house band for Phillip Lehman's Soul Fire Records. With Movshon and Lehman, he produced Lee Fields' 2002 record Problems, beginning a decades-long relationship with Fields. When Lehman decided to leave the music industry in 2003, he helped Michels found retro-soul label Truth & Soul Records with DJ "Jeff Dynamite" Silverman. Truth & Soul was active from 2004 until 2016 as both a label and production team. Outside of producing and releasing Lee Fields' albums, Truth & Soul is best known for producing Aloe Blacc's Good Things which contained the single "I Need a Dollar."

During the time of founding Truth & Soul, Michels left Sharon Jones & The Dap-Kings, with whom he had toured with for seven years and released two studio albums, and began leading his own project, El Michels Affair. El Michels Affair released its debut album, and Truth & Soul's first release, in 2005. El Michaels Affair was soon recruited to be the backing band for members of Wu-Tang Clan. In 2007, Michels helped found the Thomas Brenneck-led Menahan Street Band with whom he has released three albums as well as four albums with Charles Bradley.

In 2009, Michels produced the first Lee Field & The Expressions' album My World. The album was well-received and got the attention of The Black Keys frontman Dan Auerbach, who recruited Michels and Movshon to tour with the band. He worked with Auerbach as a songwriter and session musician for a few years before co-founding The Arcs.

Following the closure of Truth & Soul in 2016, Michels co-founded Big Crown Records with T&S label manager Danny Akalapse. Since then, he has produced a majority of the albums from the label's roster, including Lee Fields, Lady Wray, Paul & The Tall Trees, Brainstory, and Liam Bailey. Michels has also produced records for Kali Uchis, The Carters, Hanni El Khatib, Chicano Batman, Marco Benevento, and Don Toliver.

A native New Yorker, Michels now lives in Upstate NY. He maintains two recording studios under the name The Diamond Mine, one in Upstate NY and one in Long Island City with Thomas Brenneck, Nick Movshon, and Homer Steinweiss.

== Discography ==
With The Mighty Imperials

- Thunder Chicken (1999; 2001)

With Sharon Jones & the Dap-Kings

- Dap Dippin' with Sharon Jones and the Dap-Kings (2002)
- Naturally (2005)

With Lee Fields & The Expressions

- Problems (2002)
- My World (2009)
- Faithful Man (2012)
- Emma Jean (2014)
- Special Night (2016)
- It Rains Love (2019)
- Big Crown Vaults Vol. 1 (2020)

With El Michels Affair

- Sounding Out The City (2005)
- Walk On By (A Tribute To Isaac Hayes) EP (2009)
- Enter The 37th Chamber (2010)
- Loose Change EP (2014)
- Return To The 37th Chamber (2016)
- Adult Themes (2020)
- Yeti Season (2021)
- Ekundayo Inversions with Liam Bailey (2021)
- Glorious Game with Black Thought (2023)
- 24 Hr Sports (2025)

With Menahan Street Band

- Make the Road by Walking (2008)
- No Time For Dreaming (2011) (with Charles Bradley)
- The Crossing (2012)
- Victim of Love (2013) (with Charles Bradley)
- Changes (2016) (with Charles Bradley)
- Black Velvet (2018) (with Charles Bradley)
- The Exciting Sounds of Menahan Street Band (2021)

With The Fabulous Three

- The Best Of The Fabulous Three (2014)

With The Arcs

- Yours, Dreamily, (2015)
- The Arcs vs. The Inventors Vol. I EP (2015)
- Electrophonic Chronic (2023)

With The Olympians

- The Olympians (2016)

== Production discography ==
=== Albums ===
In addition to the records Michels has produced as El Michels Affair, he has produced:

- Lee Fields – Problems (Soul Fire, 2002) (produced with Nick Movshon & Phillip Lehman)
- Bronx River Parkway & Candela All Stars – San Sebastian 152 (Truth & Soul, 2008) (produced with Jeff Dynamite)
- The Memphis Sounds – Ike's Moods (2009)
- Lee Fields – My World (Truth & Soul, 2009) (produced with Jeff Dynamite)
- Aloe Blacc – Good Things (Stones Throw, 2010) (produced with Jeff Dynamite)
- Lee Fields – Faithful Man (Truth & Soul, 2012) (produced with Jeff Dynamite)
- Dr. John – Locked Down (2012); songwriting credit only (produced by Dan Auerbach)
- Lady – Lady (Truth & Soul, 2014) (produced with Jeff Dynamite)
- The Fabulous Three – The Best Of The Fabulous Three (Truth & Soul, 2014) (produced with Jeff Dynamite)
- Lee Fields – Emma Jean (Truth & Soul, 2014)
- The Arcs – Yours, Dreamily, (Nonesuch, 2015) (produced with Dan Auerbach)
- Texas – Texas 25 (2015); additional producer credit
- The Shacks – The Shacks (Big Crown, 2016) (produced with Max Schrager)
- Lee Fields & The Expressions – Special Night (Big Crown, 2016) (produced with Thomas Brenneck)
- Lady Wray – Queen Alone (Big Crown, 2016) (produced with Thomas Brenneck)
- Chicano Batman – Freedom Is Free (ATO, 2017)
- 79.5 – Predictions (Big Crown, 2018)
- The Shacks – Haze (Big Crown, 2019)
- Marco Benevento – Let It Slide (2019)
- Brainstory – Buck (Big Crown, 2019)
- Paul & The Tall Trees – So Long (Big Crown, 2019) (produced with Thomas Brenneck)
- Lee Fields & The Expressions – It Rains Love (Big Crown, 2019)
- Liam Bailey – Ekundayo (Big Crown, 2020)
- Chicano Batman – Invisible People (ATO, 2020)
- Hanni el Khatib – Flight (Innovative Leisure, 2020)
- Lee Fields & The Expressions – Big Crown Vaults Vol. 1 (Big Crown, 2020)
- El Michels Affair Meets Liam Bailey – Ekundayo Inversions (Big Crown, 2021)
- Norah Jones – I Dream of Christmas (Blue Note, 2021)
- Lady Wray – Piece Of Me (Big Crown, 2022)
- The Arcs – Electrophonic Chronic (Easy Eye Sound, 2023)
- El Michels Affair & Black Thought – Glorious Game (Big Crown, 2023)
- Liam Bailey - Zero Grace (Big Crown, 2024)
- Norah Jones - Visions (Blue Note, 2024)
- Brainstory – Sounds Good (Big Crown, 2024)
- Clairo - Charm (Clairo, 2024)
- Remi Wolf - Big Ideas (album) (Island Records, 2024)

=== Singles ===
Other tracks produced include:

- Joe Fox – "What's the Word" single (2017)
- The Carters – "Summer" from Everything is Love (2018); co-producer
- Mark Ronson – "Why Hide" (featuring Diana Gordon) from Late Night Feelings (2019); songwriting credit
- Aesop Rock – "Sleeper Car" from Spirit World Field Guide (2020) (produced with Hanni el Khatib)
- Freddie Gibbs – "Winter in America" single (2021)
- Mary J Blige – "Come See About Me" from Good Morning Gorgeous (2022); co-producer
- Kenny Beats – "Last Words" and "Rotten" from Louie (2022)
- Kali Uchis - "Moonlight" single (2023); co-producer
- Kali Uchis - "Angels All Around Me" (2025)
- Olivia Dean - "Lady Lady" (2025); co-producer

As sampled artist:

- Jay-Z – "Roc Boys (And the Winner Is)..." from American Gangster (2007)
- Ghostface Killah – "Shakey Dog Starring Lolita" from The Big Doe Rehab (2007)
- Kid Cudi – "Solo Dolo (Nightmare)" from Man on the Moon: The End of Day (2007)
- J. Cole – "Ladies" from The Warm Up (2009)
- Slum Village – "Look of Love" from Melting Pot (2010)
- Jeremih – "Ladies" from Late Nights with Jeremih (2012)
- Eminem – "Groundhog Day" The Marshall Mathers LP 2 (2013)
- Yung Lean – "Gatorade" from Unknown Death 2002 (2013)
- Rick Ross – "Free Enterprise" (featuring John Legend)" from Black Market (2015)
- Ludacris – "Not Long" (featuring Usher) Ludaversal (2015)
- Travis Scott – "Antidote" from Rodeo (2015)
- Eminem – "Offended" from Revival (2017)
- ASAP Rocky – "Brotha Man" (featuring French Montana and Frank Ocean) from Testing (2018)
- Cordae – "Family Matters" (featuring Arin Ray) from The Lost Boy (2019)
- Don Toliver – "Had Enough" (featuring Quavo and Offset) from Heaven or Hell (2020); originally on 2019's JackBoys
- French Montana – "Appreciate Everything" from They Got Amnesia (2021)
- TOBi – "Flowers" single (2022)
- Logic - "Vinyl Days" (2022)
- Brockhampton – "Listerine" from TM (2022)
- Vic Mensa – "Strawberry Louis Vuitton" (featuring Thundercat & Maeta) single (2023)
