= Perry Shall =

Perry Shall is a Grammy-nominated Philadelphia based artist. Shall's work includes music, playing in bands such as Dry Feet, Hound, and Wildflowers of America. He has designed artwork for artists such as The Black Keys, Shannon and the Clams, and musicians on the Easy Eye Sound label. He is also a self described 'collector' with a collection of over 1,400 t-shirts.

== Awards and honors ==
At the 2024 Grammy Awards, Shall was nominated for Best Recording Package for his art direction on the album Electrophonic Chronic by The Arcs.
