= Menahan Street Band =

American instrumental band

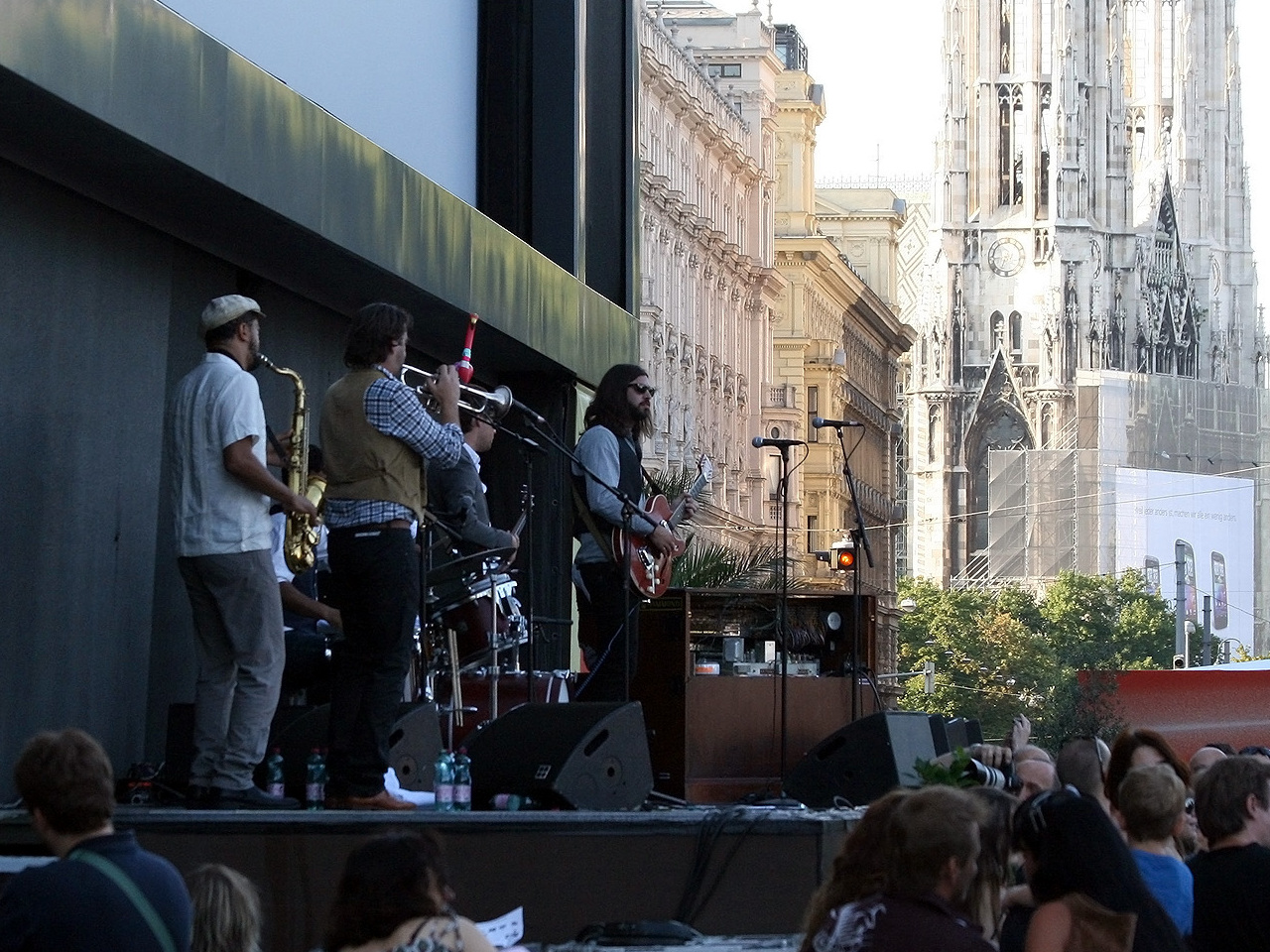
- Menahan Street Band at Jazz Fest Wien in 2011

Background information
- Origin: Brooklyn, New York, United States
- Genres: Afrobeat, funk, jazz, soul
- Years active: 2007–present
- Labels: Dunham Records, Daptone
- Members: Thomas Brenneck (guitar); Dave Guy (trumpet); Leon Michels (saxophone); Nick Movshon (bass); Homer Steinweiss (drums)
- Past members: Mike Deller (organ)

Menahan Street Band is an American, Brooklyn, New York–based instrumental band formed in 2007, that plays funk and soul music. The band features musicians from Antibalas, El Michels Affair, Sharon Jones & The Dap-Kings and the Budos Band. The group was founded by Thomas Brenneck while living in an apartment on Menahan Street in the Brooklyn neighborhood of Bushwick. Their debut album, Make the Road by Walking, was released in 2008 on Dunham, a sublabel of Daptone Records and was followed by The Crossing in 2012.

Various songs from Make the Road by Walking have been sampled by hip hop artists, including the title track, which was sampled by Jay-Z on the track "Roc Boys (And the Winner Is)...", "Going The Distance", which was sampled by Kid Cudi on his song "Solo Dolo Pt.II" featuring Kendrick Lamar on Cudi's third studio album Indicud, and "The Traitor," sampled by 50 Cent on his mixtape War Angel LP and by Cudi on his debut album Man on the Moon: The End of Day. In addition, the song "Tired of Fighting" is used as a primary sample in Kendrick Lamar's "Faith" from his eponymous 2009 EP, as well as YBN Cordae's 2019 track "Family Matters" from his debut album The Lost Boy.

After a ten-year hiatus, the band announced in December 2020 a new album, The Exciting Sounds of Menahan Street Band, which was released in February 2021.

== Members ==
All members are active on the Daptone roster, and most have played together in Sharon Jones & the Dap-Kings, El Michels Affair, The Budos Band, and/or Antibalas, among other projects.

- Thomas Brenneck – bandleader, guitar, bass, keyboards (2007–present)
- Dave Guy – trumpet, guitar (2007–present)
- Leon Michels – saxophone, woodwinds, organ (2007–present)
- Nick Movshon – bass, percussion (2007–present)
- Homer Steinweiss – drums (2007–present)
- Mike Deller – organ, piano (2007–2017; contributing musician: 2017–present)

== Discography ==
=== Studio albums ===
Title	Album details
Make the Road by Walking	Released: October 14, 2008; Label: Dunham Records; Format: LP, CD, digital
The Crossing	Released: October 30, 2012; Label: Daptone/Dunham Records; Format: LP, CD, digital
The Exciting Sounds of Menahan Street Band	Released: February 26, 2021; Label: Dunham Records; Format: LP, digital
Illusions	Released: November 13, 2026; Label: Diamond West Records; Format: LP, digital

=== Collaborative albums ===
- Charles Bradley – No Time for Dreaming (2011)
- Charles Bradley – No Time for Dreaming (The Instrumentals) (2011)
- Charles Bradley – Victim of Love (2013)
- Charles Bradley – Changes (2016)
- Charles Bradley – Changes (The Instrumentals) (2017)
- The Sha La Das – Love in the Wind (2018)
- Charles Bradley – Black Velvet (2018)
- Charles Bradley – Black Velvet (The Instrumentals) (2019)

=== Singles ===
Title	Year	Album	Format
"Make the Road by Walking" / "Karina"	2006	Make the Road by Walking	7"
"The World (Is Going Up In Flames)" / "Heartaches and Pain"	2007	No Time for Dreaming (with Charles Bradley)	7"
"The Telephone Song" / "Tired Of Fighting"	2008	No Time for Dreaming (with Charles Bradley)	7"
"The Wolf" / "Bushwick Lullaby"	2009	Non-album single	7"
"Heart Of Gold" / "In You (I Found A Love)"	2011	No Time for Dreaming (with Charles Bradley)	7"
"No Time for Dreaming" / "Golden Rule"	2011	No Time for Dreaming (with Charles Bradley)	7"
"The Crossing" / "Everyday A Dream"	2011	The Crossing	7"
"Lights Out / Keep Coming Back"	2012	The Crossing	7"
"There's a New Day Coming" / "Tommy Don't"	2019	Non-album single	7", digital
"Queen's Highway"	2020	The Exciting Sounds of Menahan Street Band	digital
"Midnight Morning" / "Stepping Through the Shadow"	2020	The Exciting Sounds of Menahan Street Band	7"
"The Duke" / "Midnight Morning"	2021	The Exciting Sounds of Menahan Street Band	7", digital
"The Starchaser"	2021	The Exciting Sounds of Menahan Street Band	digital
"Devil's Respite"	2021	The Exciting Sounds of Menahan Street Band	digital
"The Stranger" / "Black Velvet" (featuring Victor Benavides)	2021	Non-album single	7", digital
"Tropical Man" / "Mis Filos" (featuring Rogê)	2024	Non-album single	7", digital
"Palace of Illusions"	2026	Non-album single	7", digital

=== Split singles ===
- Australian Tour EP b/w Charles Bradley (2009)
- "Run it Back" b/w Charles Bradley (2012)
- "I'll Slip Away" (Charles Bradley & Menahan Street Band) b/w Rodriguez (2012)
- "Revelations" b/w Charles Bradley (2016)
- "How Did I Get Here?" b/w Larose Jackson (2021)

=== Guest appearances ===
Selected credits

- Jay-Z – "Roc Boys (And The Winner Is)..." (American Gangster, 2007) (sampled artist)
- Kid Cudi – "Solo Dolo" (Man on the Moon: The End of Day, 2009) (sampled artist)
- 50 Cent – "Talking in Codes" (War Angel LP, 2009) (sampled artist)
- Kendrick Lamar – "Faith" (featuring BJ the Chicago Kid and Punch) (Kendrick Lamar EP, 2009) (sampled artist)
- CeeLo Green – "Georgia" (single, 2010)
- 3 Titans – "College" / "The Life of a Scholar" (single, 2010)
- Eminem – "Groundhog Day" (The Marshall Mathers LP 2, 2012) (sampled artist)
- Cults – "Go Outside (Menahan Street Band Remix)" (Cults, 2013)
- Kid Cudi – "Solo Dolo, Part II" (featuring Kendrick Lamar) (Indicud, 2013) (sampled artist)
- Theophilus London – "Rio" (feat. Menahan Street Band) (single, 2013)
- Elvis Costello & The Roots – "Tripwire (Menahan Street Band Rework)" (Wise Up: Thought (Remixes & Reworks 2013) (Number Two), 2013)
- Ludacris – "Not Long" (featuring Usher) (Ludaversal, 2015) (sampled artist)
- Charles Bradley & Menahan Street Band – "Cumberland Blues" (Grateful Dead cover) (Day of the Dead, 2016)
- YBN Cordae – "Family Matters" (The Lost Boy, 2019) (sampled artist)
- Charles Bradley & Menahan Street Band – "I'll Slip Away" (Sixto Rodriguez cover, Light in the Attic & Friends, 2023)
