= Make the Road by Walking =

Studio album by Menahan Street Band
- Released: October 14, 2008
- Genre: Afrobeat, funk, jazz, soul
- Label: Dunham Records

Menahan Street Band chronology
Make the Road by Walking (2008)	The Crossing (2012)

Professional ratings
Review scores
Source	Rating
Allmusic	3/5 stars
Culturedeluxe	(8/10)

Make the Road by Walking is the debut album by Brooklyn-based group Menahan Street Band. It was released on October 14, 2008 through Dunham Records, a then-new subsidiary of Daptone Records. The album is named after a Brooklyn non-profit organization which is located around the corner from Menahan Street (on Grove Street), and promotes social and economic justice through advocacy and legal work.

== Hip-hop samples ==
The title song, "Make the Road by Walking", was sampled by Jay-Z on the track "Roc Boys (And the Winner Is)..." on his album American Gangster, which was named by Rolling Stone to be the No. 1 single of 2007.

The song "The Traitor" interpolates the melody from Lupe Fiasco’s “Hip-Hop Saved My Life” and has been sampled on songs including "Solo Dolo" by Kid Cudi and "Talking in Codes" by 50 Cent.

"Tired of Fighting" has been sampled on songs including "Faith" by Kendrick Lamar, "Flying Iron" by Curren$y and "Not Long" by Ludacris.

== Track listing ==
No.	Title	Writer(s)	Length
1.	"Make the Road by Walking"	Thomas Brenneck; Michael Deller; Leon Michels; Dave Guy; Bosco Mann; Homer Steinweiss	2:59
2.	"Tired of Fighting"	Brenneck; Guy; Michels; Fernando Velez; Homer Steinweiss	3:31
3.	"Home Again!"	Brenneck; Michels; Nick Movshon; Steinweiss	3:22
4.	"Montego Sunset"	Brenneck; Michels; Steinweiss	3:18
5.	"Karina"	Brenneck; Michels	3:25
6.	"The Traitor"	Brenneck; Guy; Michels	2:42
7.	"The Contender"	Brenneck; Daniel Foder; Guy; Michels; Steinweiss	3:48
8.	"Birds"	Brenneck; Deller; Michels; Movshon; Steinweiss	3:02
9.	"Esma"	Brenneck; Michels; Movshon	3:06
10.	"Going the Distance"	Bill Conti	6:36

== Personnel ==
The Menahan Street Band

- Thomas Brenneck – guitar, bass, drums, piano, organ, vibraphone
- Leon Michels – tenor saxophone, flute, piano, organ, congas
- Dave Guy – trumpet
- Homer Steinweiss – drums
- Nick Movshon – bass, drums
- Michael Deller – piano, organ

Additional musicians

- Toby Pazner – vibraphone
- Bosco Mann – bass
- Daniel Foder – bass
- Aaron Johnson – trombone
- Fernando Velez – congas
- Cochemea Gastelum – flute

Technical personnel

- Thomas Brenneck – producer, mixing
- Gabriel Roth – mixing
- Homer Steinweiss – album design, cover photo
- Danny Miller – album design
- David Serre – album design
- Parsley Steinweiss – inside photo
- Steve Berson – mastering
