= Locked Down (album) =

Studio album by Dr. John
- Released: April 3, 2012
- Recorded: 2011
- Studios: Easy Eye Sound (Nashville, Tennessee)
- Genres: Rock; funk; psychedelic rock; gospel; blues; Afrobeat
- Length: 42:26
- Label: Nonesuch
- Producer: Dan Auerbach

Dr. John chronology
Tribal (2010)	Locked Down (2012)	Ske-Dat-De-Dat: The Spirit of Satch (2014)

Locked Down is a studio album by American singer-songwriter Dr. John. It was released on April 3, 2012, through Nonesuch Records. The recording sessions took place in 2011 at Easy Eye Sound in Nashville. The album was produced by Dan Auerbach. It features contributions from Dan Auerbach, Max Weissenfeldt, Leon Michels, Nick Movshon, Brian Olive, and the McCrary Sisters. At the 55th Annual Grammy Awards held in 2013, the album won a Grammy Award for Best Blues Album.

== Critical reception ==
Professional ratings
Aggregate scores
Source	Rating
AnyDecentMusic?	8.1/10
Metacritic	86/100
Review scores
Source	Rating
AllMusic	4/5 stars
Clash	8/10
Consequence of Sound	3.5/5 stars
Entertainment Weekly	A−
The Guardian	5/5 stars
Los Angeles Times	4/4 stars
The Observer	4/5 stars
Paste	9/10
Pitchfork	7.5/10
Rolling Stone	4/5 stars

Locked Down was met with universal acclaim from music critics. At Metacritic, which assigns a normalized rating out of 100 to reviews from mainstream publications, the album received an average score of 86, based on thirty reviews. The aggregator AnyDecentMusic? has the critical consensus of the album at an 8.1 out of 10, based on twenty-six reviews.

Dave Simpson of The Guardian praised the album, saying: "no one makes music like this: the Night Tripper rampages inimitably through swamp blues, voodoo funk and afrobeat, with his trademark piano". Randall Roberts of Los Angeles Times also praised the work, naming it "one of the best of his career". Holly Gleason of Paste called it "a sweeping confession of sanctification, embrace and glory, this is deliverance personified". AllMusic's Thom Jurek stated: "no matter which era or what record you prefer, as an album, Locked Down stands with Rebennack's best". John Freeman of Clash labeled it as "a mystical brew of funk, gospel and delta rock". Will Hermes of Rolling Stone wrote: "full of muscled, vintage R&B grooves, fevered soloing, psychedelic arrangements and oracular mumbo jumbo, it's the wildest record Rebennack has made in many years". Kitty Empire of The Observer wrote: "what emerges from their empathy is a thoroughly great record that adds punch and groove to Rebennack's humid party music". Stephen Deusner of Pitchfork found this album "still stands out among his recent work, not so much for the leap of faith he took collaborating with Auerbach but because it turned out so damn well". Adam Kivel of Consequence concluded: "Dr. John and Auerbach come together to capture a rich, evocative, almost apocalyptic party on Locked Down, an album that makes you dance while wondering about the state of the world".

== Track listing ==
All tracks are written by Malcolm John Rebennack Jr., Dan Auerbach, Maximilian Weissenfeldt, Leon Michels, Nick Movshon and Brian Olive.

No.	Title	Length
1.	"Locked Down"	4:59
2.	"Revolution"	3:25
3.	"Big Shot"	3:48
4.	"Ice Age"	4:23
5.	"Getaway"	4:35
6.	"Kingdom of Izzness"	3:36
7.	"You Lie"	4:45
8.	"Eleggua"	2:53
9.	"My Children, My Angels"	5:06
10.	"God's Sure Good"	4:56
Total length:		42:26

== Personnel ==
- Mac "Dr. John" Rebennack Jr. – songwriter, lead vocals, keyboards
- Dan Auerbach – songwriter, backing vocals, guitar, percussion, producer, mixing
- Max Weissenfeldt – songwriter, backing vocals, drums, percussion
- Leon Michels – songwriter, backing vocals, keyboards, percussion, woodwind
- Nick Movshon – songwriter, backing vocals, electric bass, upright bass, percussion
- Brian Olive – songwriter, backing vocals, guitar, percussion, woodwind
- Regina McCrary – backing vocals
- Ann McCrary – backing vocals
- Alfreda McCrary – backing vocals
- Collin Dupuis – engineering, mixing
- Danny Tomczak – engineering assistant
- Brian Lucey – mastering
- Michael Carney – art direction and photo coloring
- Joshua Black Wilkins – photography
- John Peets – photography
- Alysse Gafkjen – photography
- Gabe Soria – liner notes

== Charts ==
Chart (2012)	Peak position
Austrian Albums (Ö3 Austria)	50
Belgian Albums (Ultratop Flanders)	48
Danish Albums (Hitlisten)	33
Dutch Albums (Album Top 100)	16
French Albums (SNEP)	126
New Zealand Albums (RMNZ)	35
Norwegian Albums (VG-lista)	16
Scottish Albums (Official Charts)	48
Swedish Albums (Sverigetopplistan)	39
UK Albums (Official Charts)	51
US Billboard 200	33
US Top Rock Albums (Billboard)	8
US Top Blues Albums (Billboard)	1
US Indie Store Album Sales (Billboard)	3
US Vinyl Albums (Billboard)	14
