= Yours, Dreamily, =

Studio album by the Arcs
- Released: September 4, 2015
- Recorded: 2015
- Studios: The Sound Factory (Los Angeles); The Diamond Mine (New York City); Easy Eye Sound (Nashville); Electric Lady (New York City)
- Genres: Garage rock; soul; rhythm and blues; psychedelic rock
- Length: 45:56
- Label: Nonesuch
- Producers: Dan Auerbach; Leon Michels

The Arcs chronology
Yours, Dreamily, (2015)	Electrophonic Chronic (2023)

Singles from Yours, Dreamily,
- 1. "Stay in My Corner" Released: June 9, 2015; 2. "Outta My Mind" Released: June 29, 2015; 3. "Put a Flower in Your Pocket" Released: August 13, 2015

Yours, Dreamily, is the debut album by the Arcs, a side-project by Dan Auerbach of The Black Keys. The album was released on September 4, 2015.

== Recording ==
The album originated as an Auerbach solo project but morphed into a collaborative effort, with musicians Leon Michels, Richard Swift, Homer Steinweiss, and Nick Movshon. All members of the band share songwriting credit for the album. It was recorded over two weeks at the Sound Factory in Los Angeles, Electric Lady Studios in New York, Auerbach's Easy Eye Sound in Nashville, and the Sound Mine in New York. Auerbach and Michels co-produced the album, and Tchad Blake mixed it. The New York-based all-female mariachi band Flor de Toloache perform backing vocals on several album tracks and the lead vocals on "Chains of Love".

== Promotion ==
The first track released from the album was "Stay in My Corner", a song inspired by the May 2015 Floyd Mayweather Jr. vs. Manny Pacquiao boxing match. "Stay in My Corner" was released as a special 7" vinyl record for the Mayweather-Pacquiao match and backed with the non-album track "Tomato Can".

On June 9, 2015, the album was announced and "Stay in My Corner" was made available for download with pre-orders of the album via iTunes and the band's website. One month later, on July 10, 2015, the track "Outta My Mind" was released for download as the second single from the album, and with the non-album track "My Mind" on 7" vinyl record. A video for the song "Put a Flower in Your Pocket" was released in mid-August 2015.

== Track listing ==
All songs produced by Dan Auerbach and Leon Michels.

No.	Title	Writer(s)	Length
1.	"Once We Begin (Intro)"	Dan Auerbach; Leon Michels	0:31
2.	"Outta My Mind"	Auerbach; Michels; Nick Movshon; Homer Steinweiss	3:34
3.	"Put a Flower in Your Pocket"	Auerbach; Michels; Richard Swift	3:55
4.	"Pistol Made of Bones"	Auerbach	3:22
5.	"Everything You Do (You Do for You)"	Auerbach; Michels	3:06
6.	"Stay in My Corner"	Auerbach; Michels; Movshon; Steinweiss	3:19
7.	"Cold Companion"	Auerbach; Michels; Swift	3:55
8.	"The Arc"	Auerbach; Michels; Movshon; Steinweiss	3:52
9.	"Nature's Child"	Auerbach; Michels	3:12
10.	"Velvet Ditch"	Auerbach; Michels; Swift	3:12
11.	"Chains of Love"	Auerbach; Michels; Swift	3:11
12.	"Come & Go"	Auerbach; Michels	4:00
13.	"Rosie (Ooh La La)"	Auerbach; Michels; Swift	3:46
14.	"Searching the Blue"	Auerbach	3:01
Total length:			45:56

== Personnel ==
Personnel adapted from Yours, Dreamily, liner notes.

=== The Arcs ===
- Dan Auerbach – vocals (all tracks except 1), electric guitar (tracks 2, 4–8, 9, 10, 12, 13 and 14), bass guitar (tracks 2, 3, 5, 9, 10, 11 and 13), acoustic guitar (tracks 3 and 14), keyboards (tracks 2, 9, 11, 12 and 13), synthesizer (track 3), buzz (track 13), percussion (tracks 12 and 14)
- Leon Michels – piano (tracks 2, 6, 8, 9, 12 and 13), organ (tracks 2, 7, 8 and 9), keyboards (tracks 6, 9, 11, 12 and 13), saxophone (tracks 5, 10, 12 and 14), electric guitar (tracks 10, 11 and 12), percussion (track 1, 9 and 12), synthesizer (track 3), drums (track 9), bass guitar (track 12)
- Richard Swift – drums (tracks 3, 4, 10, 11 and 13), keyboards (tracks 5, 10 and 11), acoustic guitar and percussion (track 4), vocals (track 5)
- Homer Steinweiss – drums (tracks 2, 6 and 8)
- Nick Movshon – bass guitar (tracks 6 and 8)

=== Additional personnel ===
- Mariachi Flor de Toloache – vocals (tracks 3, 4, 8, 11 and 13), horns and strings (track 4)
- Veronica Medellin – guitarrón (tracks 4 and 7)
- Russ Pahl – electric guitar (track 3)
- Chamberlin – drums (track 5)
- Thomas Brenneck – guitar (track 8)
- Ray Mason – trombone (track 9)
- Lee Fields – vocals (track 9)
- Bobby Emmett – piano, organ, horns and vocals (tracks 14)
- Kenny Vaughan – baritone guitar (track 14)
- Russ Pahl – pedal steel guitar (track 14)
- Dave Roe – upright bass (track 14)
- Jeffery Clemens – drums (track 14)
- Brian Olive – vocals (track 14)

== Charts ==
Chart (2015)	Peak position
Australian Albums (ARIA)	75
Belgian Albums (Ultratop Flanders)	46
Belgian Albums (Ultratop Wallonia)	102
Dutch Albums (Album Top 100)	37
French Albums (SNEP)	90
German Albums (Offizielle Top 100)	64
Italian Albums (FIMI)	94
Scottish Albums (Official Charts)	42
Swiss Albums (Schweizer Hitparade)	34
UK Albums (Official Charts)	40
US Billboard 200	27
