= Dawn (Yebba album) =

Studio album by Yebba
- Released: September 10, 2021
- Recorded: 2018–2021
- Studio: Electric Lady
- Genre: Pop; R&B
- Length: 38:48
- Label: RCA
- Producer: Mark Ronson; Yebba; Thomas Brenneck; Ricky Damian; Kaytranada

Yebba chronology
Dawn (2021)	Jean (2026)

Singles from Dawn
- 1. "Distance" Released: May 8, 2020; 2. "October Sky" Released: June 11, 2021; 3. "Louie Bag" Released: July 27, 2021; 4. "Boomerang" Released: August 25, 2021; 5. "All I Ever Wanted" Released: September 7, 2021

Dawn is the debut studio album by American singer-songwriter Yebba. It was released on September 10, 2021, with 12 tracks, through RCA Records.

== Background and composition ==
In 2017, Yebba independently released her debut single "Evergreen", co-written with British musician-songwriter Jin Jin, which earned her a record deal with Pulse Records. In the process, she met Mark Ronson, who helped produce Dawn, and worked with him on his 2019 album Late Night Feelings. Ronson revealed that, whilst working with him, Yebba was steadfast in her taste. "You’re never going to get a sound or a colour or a tone past Yebba that she doesn't like," he said. When touching on the creative process of Dawn, he elaborated, "She put her trust in me, but only in the name of realizing her vision" and said she was definitely "one of the greatest vocalists I've ever recorded; certainly one of the greatest vocalists, songwriters and musicians of her generation."

By the end of 2018, after mourning the death of her mother the previous year and a lot of time considering to release music as an artist herself, she signed a record deal with RCA Records. She said, "I made sure I did two-and-a-half years of self-homework, of digesting a trauma before I could make a commitment to an entire company." As for Ronson, he admits "There was a time where [sic] of course we would have loved to sign her to our label Zelig Records (a sub-label to Columbia), but she had different ideas." With the deal in hand, she began writing material for the album, which was later revealed to be named after her mother.

== Critical reception ==
Professional ratings
Aggregate scores
Source	Rating
Metacritic	84/100
Review scores
Source	Rating
Clash	8/10
Exclaim!	8/10
The Line of Best Fit	7/10

Reviewing the album for Variety, Jem Aswad wrote that on the album, Yebba "occupies a musical terrain somewhere between pop, R&B and, at times, 1970s jazz fusion, with tinkling electric piano and synthesizers that conjure flashes of Stevie Wonder's Fulfillingness' First Finale." Aswad went on to say that an "obsession with D'Angelo's 2000 classic Voodoo led Yebba and Ronson to enlist several of that album's musicians" for Dawn, including the Roots drummer Questlove, bassist Pino Palladino and keyboardist James Poyser. Aswad also felt that the "album's diversity is reflected in its collaborators", naming the rappers A$AP Rocky and Smino, electronic musician Kaytranada, and Beck's guitarist Smokey Hormel as examples. The album was nominated for the 2022 Grammy Award for Best Engineered Album, Non-Classical.

== Track listing ==
Dawn track listing
No.	Title	Writer(s)	Producer(s)	Length
1.	"How Many Years"	Abbey Smith; James Francies; George Moore	Mark Ronson	3:07
2.	"Stand"	Smith; Francies; Andrew Wyatt; Homer Steinweiss; Nicholas Movshon	Ronson; Francies^{[m]}; Ricky Damian^{[m]}; Zach Brown^{[m]}; Carl Bespolka^{[m]}	5:19
3.	"Boomerang"	Smith; Ilsey Juber; Thomas Brenneck	Ronson; Brenneck; Picard Brothers^{[c]}; Damian^{[m]}; Joe Harrison^{[m]}; Simon Guzman^{[m]}; Tom Malfalcone^{[m]}	2:49
4.	"All I Ever Wanted"	Smith; Francies; Juber; Mark Ronson	Ronson; Yebba; Francies^{[m]}; Damian^{[v]}	3:23
5.	"Far Away" (featuring A$AP Rocky)	Smith; Francies; Jacques Smith II; Malachi Mabson; Charles Myers; Rakim Mayers	Ronson; Yebba; Damian^{[c]}; Hector Delgado^{[c]}	3:19
6.	"Dawn"	Smith	Yebba	0:34
7.	"October Sky"	Smith	Ronson; Damian^{[m]}	3:14
8.	"Louie Bag" (featuring Smino)	Smith; Francies; Dacoury Natche; Kurtis McKenzie; Christopher Smith Jr.; Kamaal Fareed	Yebba; Francies^{[m]}; DJ Dahi^{[m]}; Damian^{[m]}	3:42
9.	"One More Smile"	Smith; Francies	Damian	1:56
10.	"Love Came Down"	Smith; Juber; Ronson	Ronson; Kaytranada; Picard Brothers^{[c]}; Hudson Mohawke^{[c]}	2:57
11.	"Distance"	Smith; Francies; Alana Chenevert; Peter Wilkins	Ronson; Yebba	4:15
12.	"Paranoia Purple"	Smith	Yebba	4:33
Total length:				38:48

Notes

- ^{^[c]} signifies a co-producer
- ^{^[m]} signifies a miscellaneous producer
- ^{^[v]} signifies a vocal producer
- "Stand" interpolates the song "When U Went Away", as performed by Mark Ronson and featuring vocals from Yebba.

== Charts ==
Chart performance for Dawn
Chart (2021)	Peak position
US Heatseekers Albums (Billboard)	6
