= Light in the Attic & Friends =

Compilation album by various artists
- Released: November 24, 2023
- Length: 84:35
- Label: Light in the Attic

Singles from Light in the Attic & Friends
- 1. "We Don't Run" Released: October 2, 2023; 2. "How Could You Let Me Go" Released: November 10, 2023; 3. "Blink" Released: November 17, 2023

Light in the Attic & Friends ratings
Review scores
Source	Rating
The Times	5/5 stars

Light in the Attic & Friends is a compilation album by the American record label Light in the Attic Records. The album collects from Light in the Attic's Cover Songs singles, a series of 7" singles featuring contemporary artists covering past Light in the Attic artists, as well as including a number of original recordings. The compilation was released digitally and on vinyl on November 24, 2023, with the vinyl release being exclusive to Record Store Day's Black Friday sale.

== Release ==
The album was first announced on October 2, 2023, with a release date set for November 24 by Light in the Attic Records. It released digitally and on vinyl, with the vinyl release being exclusive to Record Store Day's Black Friday sale. The two-disc release was pressed on "smash colored" vinyl. Its cover art was designed by British artist Sophy Hollington, and it came with a booklet of liner notes written by Lydia Hyslop.

The announcement came with its lead single, a cover of Willie Nelson's "We Don't Run" by the father-daughter duo of Ethan and Maya Hawke, which is the duo's first music release together. The second single, Vashti Bunyan and Devendra Banhart's cover of Madelynn Von Ritz's "How Could You Let Me Go", was released on November 10. The third single, Mary Lattimore's cover of Hiroshi Yoshimura's "Blink", was released on November 17.

== Track listing ==
Light in the Attic & Friends track listing
No.	Title	Original artist	Length
1.	"I'll Slip Away" (Charles Bradley and The Menahan Street Band)	Sixto Rodriguez	3:32
2.	"After Laughter (Comes Tears)" (Sweet Tea)	Wendy Rene	3:31
3.	"How Could You Let Me Go" (Vashti Bunyan and Devendra Banhart)	Madelynn Von Ritz	4:11
4.	"We'll Understand" (Barbara Lynn)	The Supreme Jubilees	4:55
5.	"Key to Love Is Understanding" (BadBadNotGood featuring Jonah Yano)	The Majestics	5:49
6.	"If I'm in Luck I Might Get Picked Up" (Iggy Pop and Zig Zags)	Betty Davis	3:59
7.	"Low Life" (Mozart Estate)	Public Image Ltd	3:27
8.	"Once I Was" (Leslie Winer and Maxwell Sterling)	Tim Buckley	3:51
9.	"We Don't Run" (Ethan and Maya Hawke)	Willie Nelson	3:40
10.	"Won't You Tell Your Dreams" (Gold Leaves)	Lee Hazlewood	3:19
11.	"The Kneeling Drunkard's Plea" (Swamp Dogg, John C. Reilly, Jenny Lewis, and Tim Heidecker)	The Louvin Brothers	3:29
12.	"You've Become a Habit" (Silas Short)	Leo Nocentelli	3:59
13.	"Honey Moon" (Mac DeMarco)	Haruomi Hosono	2:36
14.	"Send It On" (Cameron Bethany)	D'Angelo	6:07
15.	"Le chant des fauves" (Roedelius)	Tinariwen	6:51
16.	"Same Old Man" (Mark Lanegan)	Karen Dalton	2:47
17.	"Something on Your Mind" (Angel Olsen)	Karen Dalton	3:43
18.	"Blink" (Mary Lattimore)	Hiroshi Yoshimura	5:40
19.	"Plain as Your Eyes Can See" (Acetone)	Jim Sullivan	3:50
20.	"Rabbit Hills" (Steve Gunn and Bridget St John)	Michael Chapman	5:19
Total length:			84:35

== Personnel ==
- John Baldwin – mastering engineer
- Sophy Hollington – cover art
- Lydia Hyslop – liner notes

== See also ==
- "Flood's Guide to Record Store Day Black Friday 2023" by A.D. Amorosi, with a section on Light in the Attic & Friends
