= Thomas Brenneck =

American guitarist and producer

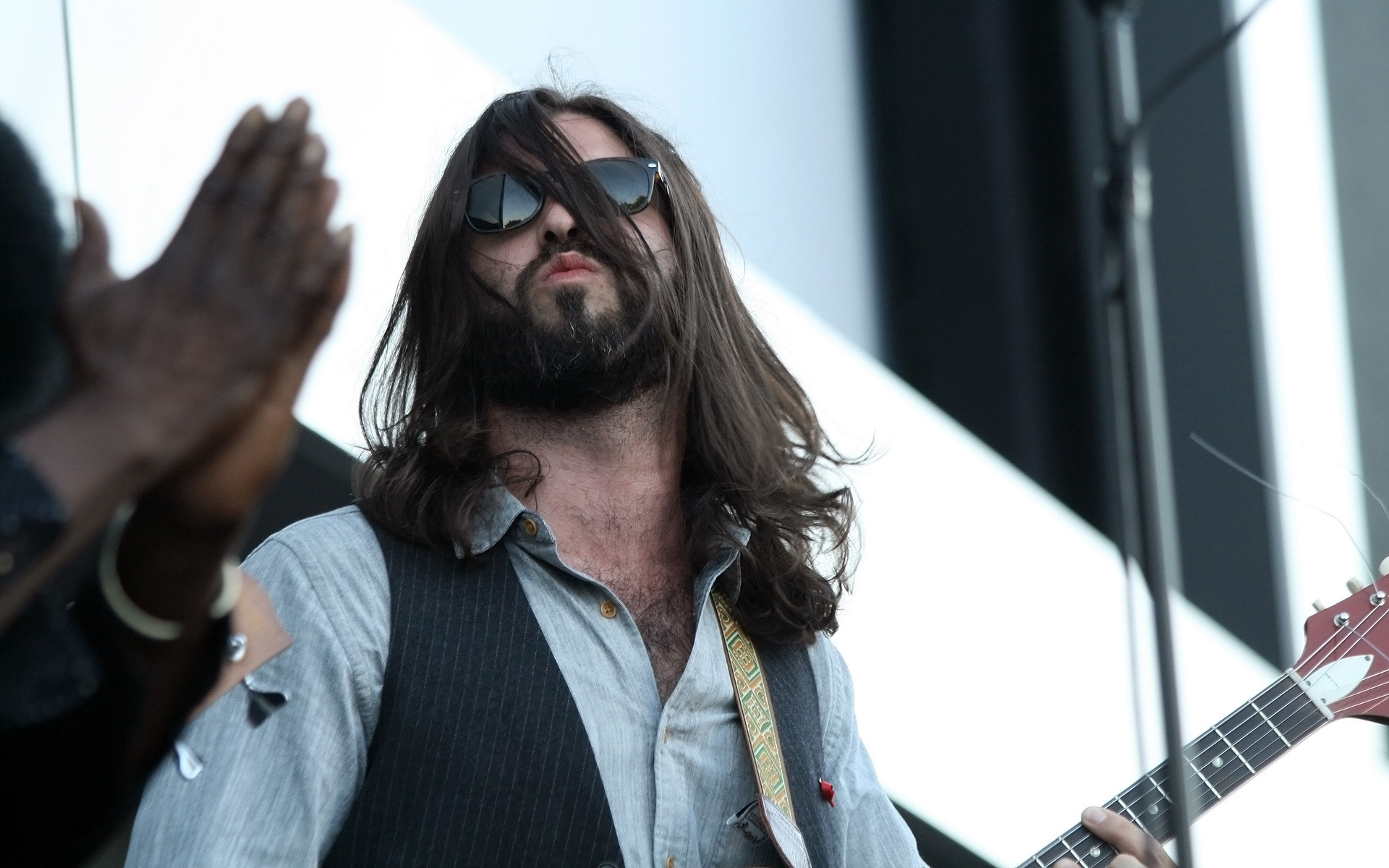
- Brenneck with Charles Bradley in 2011

Background information
- Also known as: Tommy "TNT" Brenneck
- Born: Thomas R. Brenneck; 1981 (age 44–45); Staten Island, New York, U.S.
- Occupations: Musician; producer; engineer
- Instruments: Guitar
- Years active: 2001–present
- Member of: Menahan Street Band; The Budos Band; El Michels Affair; The Moonjam
- Formerly of: Sharon Jones & the Dap-Kings

Thomas "Tommy" Brenneck is an American guitarist, record producer, and engineer, best known as the leader of the Menahan Street Band and member of The Budos Band, Sharon Jones & The Dap-Kings, and El Michels Affair. He is the founder of Dunham Records, a subsidiary of seminal retro-soul label Daptone Records, and was the producer of soul singer Charles Bradley. As a producer session musician, he frequently works with Daptone and Big Crown Records artists.

== History ==
Brenneck was born and raised in Staten Island, New York. He is a self-taught guitarist who joined the original Daptone band The Dap-Kings at the age of 20. Brenneck quickly became one of the essential members of the Daptone family, working closely with the label founder and producer Gabe Roth aka Bosco Mann, and playing and touring with Sharon Jones, the label matriarch. Sharon gave Brenneck his nickname, Tommy "TNT" Brenneck.

Since then, Brenneck founded Dunham Records and Studio, cultivated the music and career of the late Charles Bradley (also his son's godfather), performed and recorded with Amy Winehouse and is a principal in his other Daptone project the Menahan Street Band.

Brenneck has been a session guitarist, writer and producer on projects with Lady Gaga, CeeLo Green, Dan Auerbach, Beyoncé & Jay-Z, Josh Tillman AKA Father John Misty, Rufus Wainwright and Miley Cyrus, among others. Additionally, he has played guitar for Amy Winehouse and he is one of the musicians featured on "Telepathy" by Christina Aguilera featuring Nile Rodgers.

As an engineer on Yebba's Dawn, he was nominated for the Grammy Award for Best Engineered Album, Non-Classical at the 64th Annual Grammy Awards.

=== Dunham Records and recording studios ===
Brenneck is the founder of Dunham Records, a subsidiary of Daptone Records. The record label originally operated out of Brenneck's bedroom in Bushwick, Brooklyn and produced iconic hits from artists including Charles Bradley before eventually moving to a larger space in Williamsburg, Brooklyn.

Brenneck ran a small recording studio out of his home in Bushwick, Brooklyn before opening Dunham Sound Studios with Homer Steinwiess in Williamsburg in 2008. The all-analog studio operated with Menahan Street Band as the in-house band and recorded artists including Mark Ronson, Rufus Wainwright, Cee-lo Green, Theophilus London and Diane Birch, among others. In 2014, the studio was succeeded by The Diamond Mine, a recording studio in Long Island City founded with Steinweiss, Nick Movshon, and Leon Michels.

In 2017, Brenneck moved to Los Angeles with his wife and two children. He now works out of Los Angeles' The Sound Factory studio with Mark Ronson, whom he got to know well during his time with Winehouse.

== Discography ==
=== Studio albums ===
Artist	Album	Label	Catalog No.	Year of Release	Available Formats
Sharon Jones & the Dap-Kings	Naturally	Daptone Records	DAP-004	2005	Vinyl, LP, Album
The Budos Band	The Budos Band	Daptone Records	DAP-005	2005	CD, LP, iTunes
El Michels Affair	Sounding Out The City	Truth & Soul		2005	
The Budos Band	The Budos Band II	Daptone Records	DAP-011	2007	CD, LP, iTunes
Sharon Jones & the Dap-Kings	100 Days, 100 Nights	Daptone Records		2007	
Menahan Street Band	Make the Road by Walking	Dunham Records	DAP-015	2008	CD, Album
El Michels Affair	Enter The 37th Chamber	Fat Beats		2009	
The Budos Band	The Budos Band III	Daptone Records	DAP-020	2010	CD, LP, MP3, FLAC
Sharon Jones & the Dap-Kings	I Learned the Hard Way	Daptone Records		2010	
Menahan Street Band	The Crossing	Dunham Records	DAP-029	2012	LP, Album
The Budos Band	Burnt Offering	Daptone Records	DAP-034	2014	CD, LP, MP3, FLAC
El Michels Affair	Return To The 37th Chamber	Big Crown		2017	
The Budos Band	Budos Band V	Daptone Records	DAP-057	2019	CD, LP, MP3, FLAC
El Michels Affair	Adult Themes	Big Crown		2020	
Menahan Street Band	The Exciting Sounds of...	Dunham Records	DAP-063	2021	CD, LP, digital
The Budos Band	Long in the Tooth	Daptone Records	DAP-065	2020	CD, LP, MP3, FLAC

=== EPs ===
Artist	Title	Label	Catalog No.	Year of Release	Available Formats
The Budos Band	The Budos Band EP	Daptone Records	DAP-12002	2009	CD, 12"
The Budos Band	The Shape of Mayhem to Come (Recorded Live at the Grey Eagle, Halloween 2015)	Daptone Records	DAP-1205	2016	12", MP3, FLAC

=== Singles ===
Artist	Title	Label	Catalog No.	Year of Release	Available Formats
The Budos Band	The Budos Band - Up From the South b/w T.I.B.W.F.	Daptone Records	DAP-1023	2005	7"
The Budos Band	The Budos Band - The Proposition b/w Ghost Walk	Daptone Records	DAP-1027	2006	7"
Menahan Street Band	"Make the Road by Walking" / "Karina"	Dunham Records	DNM-101	2006	7"
The Budos Band	The Poets of Rhythm/The Budos Band - More Mess on My Thing b/w Budos Theme	Freestyle Records	FSR7024	2006	7"
Charles Bradley & Menahan Street Band	"The World (Is Going Up In Flames)" / "Heartaches and Pain"	Dunham Records	DNM-102	2007	7"
Charles Bradley & Menahan Street Band	"The Telephone Song" / "Tired Of Fighting"	Dunham Records	DUN-103	2008	7"
Menahan Street Band	"The Wolf" / "Bushwick Lullaby"	Dunham Records, Daptone Records	DUN-104, DAP-1045	2009	7"
The Budos Band	The Budos Band/Sharon Jones & the Dap-Kings - Day Tripper b/w Money	Daptone Records	DAP-1050 (Record Store Day 2010 release)	2010	7"
The Budos Band	The Budos Band - Kakal b/w Hidden Hand	Daptone Records	DAP-1051-P(promotional copy) *limited press of 800	2010	7"
Menahan Street Band	"The Crossing" / "Everyday A Dream"	Dunham Records, Daptone Records	DUN-106A, DAP-1054	2011	7"
Charles Bradley & Menahan Street Band	"Heart Of Gold" / "In You (I Found A Love)"	Dunham Records, Daptone Records	DUN-110A, DAP-1059	2011	7"
Menahan Street Band	"Lights Out / Keep Coming Back"	Dunham Records, Daptone Records	DUN-112A	2012	7"
The Budos Band	The Budos Band - Burnt Offering b/w Seizure	Daptone Records	DAP-1085 *included limited press of 100 color	2014	7"
The Budos Band	The Budos Band - Magus Mountain b/w Vertigo	Daptone Records	DAP-1088 *included limited press of 100 color	2015	7"
The Budos Band	The Budos Band - Maelstrom b/w Avalanche	Daptone Records	DAP-1099	2016	7"

=== Other appearances ===
"Up From the South" of The Budos Band is featured in a commercial for the NFL Network (2013).

"T.I.B.W.F." of The Budos Band is featured in a series of commercials for 1800 Tequila and in the sixth episode of This American Life.

"The Chicago Falcon (Remix)" of The Budos band is featured on Wale's fourth mixtape, The Mixtape About Nothing (2008).

"Budos Rising" and "The Proposition" of The Budos Band are featured in MLB 09: The Show and MLB 10: The Show, respectively, for PlayStation consoles.

"King Charles" of The Budos Band is featured in episode 37 of the HBO TV series Entourage ("Manic Monday," Season 3).

"Origin of Man," "Up From The South," "T.I.B.W.F." and "Hidden Hand" of The Budos Band are featured in the movie New York, I Love You (2009).

"Mas o Menos", "Ride or Die" and "Scorpion" of The Budos Band are featured on the fictional radio station "Daptone Radio" in the game Sleeping Dogs by United Front Games and Square Enix London. (2012)

"The Volcano Song" of The Budos Band is featured in the documentary I Knew It Was You: Rediscovering John Cazale (2009).

"The Sticks" of The Budos Band is featured in the background of a trailer for Destiny's Dark Below DLC. (2014)

"Say Amen (Saturday Night)" by Panic! At The Disco features an interpolation Of Aphasia off of the album Burnt Offering of The Budos Band.

== Production discography ==
=== Albums ===
- The Budos Band – The Budos Band (Daptone, 2005) (with Bosco Mann)
- The Budos Band – The Budos Band II (Daptone, 2007) (with Bosco Mann)
- Menahan Street Band – Make The Road By Walking (Dunham, 2008)
- The Budos Band – The Budos Band III (Daptone, 2007) (with Bosco Mann)
- Menahan Street Band – The Crossing (Dunham, 2012)
- Charles Bradley – Victim Of Love (Dunham, 2013)
- Low Cut Connie – Hi Honey (Contender Records, 2014)
- The Budos Band – Burnt Offering (Daptone, 2014) (produced with The Budos Band)
- The Black Box Revelation – Highway Cruiser (Bana Kin, 2015)
- Paul & The Tall Trees – Our Love In The Light (Big Crown, 2016)
- Lee Fields & The Expressions – Special Night (Big Crown, 2016) (produced with Leon Michels)
- Lady Wray – Queen Alone (Big Crown, 2016) (produced with Leon Michels)
- Charles Bradley – Changes (Dunham, 2016)
- The Sha La Das – Love In The Wind (Dunham, 2018)
- Charles Bradley – Black Velvet (Dunham, 2018)
- The Budos Band – V (Daptone, 2019)
- The Jay Vons – The Word (Daptone, 2019) (produced with Wayne Gordon & The Jay Vons)
- Paul & The Tall Trees – So Long (Big Crown, 2019) (produced with Leon Michels)
- The Budos Band – Long In The Tooth (Dunham, 2020)
- Menahan Street Band – The Exciting Sounds Of Menahan Street Band (Dunham, 2021)
- Molly Lewis - The Forgotten Edge (Jagjaguwar, 2021, EP)
- Molly Lewis - Mirage (Jagjaguwar, 2022, EP)
- Molly Lewis - On the Lips (Jagjaguwar, 2024, LP)

=== Other tracks ===
Other standalone tracks include:

- 3 Titans – "College" / "The Life Of A Scholar" (Dunham, 2010) (with Homer Steinwiess)
- The Like – Release Me (Geffen, 2010); 2 tracks (with Mark Ronson)
- CeeLo Green – "Georgia" single (Elektra, 2010)
- Ikebe Shakedown – Ikebe Shakedown (Ubiquity, 2011); 3 tracks
- The Sha La Das – "Sha La Da La La (Christmas Time)" single (Dunham, 2013)
- Black Lips – Underneath The Rainbow (Vice, 2014); 4 tracks
- Paloma Faith – "Price Of Fame" from The Architect (RCA, 2017) (with Homer Steinwiess)
- Lee Fields & The Expressions – "Time" single (Big Crown, 2017) (produced with Leon Michels)
- Charlotte Day Wilson – "I Can Only Whisper" featuring BadBadNotGood from Alpha (2021) (with Wilson)
