= The Arcs =

American garage rock band

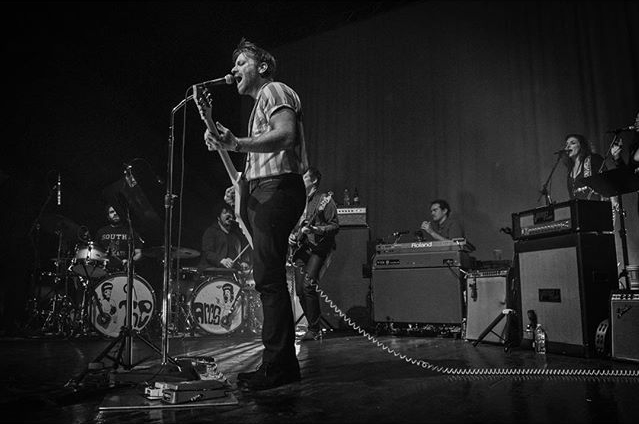
- The Arcs performing at Lifestyle Communities Pavilion in Columbus, Ohio on December 4, 2015

Background information
- Genres: Garage rock; soul; rhythm and blues; psychedelic rock
- Years active: 2015–present
- Labels: Nonesuch; Easy Eye Sound
- Spinoff of: The Black Keys
- Members: Dan Auerbach; Leon Michels; Nick Movshon; Homer Steinweiss
- Past members: Richard Swift
- Website: http://www.thearcs.com/

The Arcs are an American garage rock band formed by Dan Auerbach, the guitarist and vocalist of the Black Keys. The band consists of Auerbach, Leon Michels, Nick Movshon, Homer Steinweiss, and formerly Richard Swift, who died in 2018. They released their debut album Yours, Dreamily, in 2015. Their second album, Electrophonic Chronic, was released in January 2023.

== History ==
Auerbach announced this side project after performing on the Governors Ball in 2015. The group's first album, Yours, Dreamily, was released on September 4, 2015. Members include Leon Michels, Nick Movshon, Homer Steinweiss, and Richard Swift, along with contributions from Kenny Vaughan and Flor de Toloache. The Arcs performed at the 2016 Coachella Festival along with Wayhome and Osheaga. Swift died in July 2018.

A second album was first announced by the band while touring in 2015 but failed to materialize. On October 13, 2022, the band announced their second studio album, Electrophonic Chronic, which was released on January 27, 2023, through Auerbach's Easy Eye Sound label. The announcement coincided the release of the album's lead single, "Keep on Dreamin'". The album features the band's full original lineup, including Swift. It was recorded primarily before Swift's death, at Auerbach's Easy Eye Sound studio in Nashville, Electric Lady Studios in Manhattan, and Michels' Diamond Mine studio in Queens, New York. It was co-produced by Auerbach and Michels. In the album's press release, Auerbach said, "This new record is all about honoring Swift. It's a way for us to say goodbye to him, by revisiting him playing and laughing, singing. It was heavy at times, but I think it was really helpful to do it."

== Members ==
Current members

- Dan Auerbach – lead vocals, electric guitar (2015–present)
- Leon Michels – farfisa organ, synthesizer, electric guitar, saxophone, drum pads (2015–present)
- Nick Movshon – bass guitar (2015–present)
- Homer Steinweiss – drums, percussion, bass guitar (2015–present)

Former members

- Richard Swift – drums, percussion, keyboards, drum pads, backing vocals (2015–2018; his death)

== Discography ==
=== Albums ===
List of studio albums, with selected details
Title	Details	Peak chart positions	
Title	Details	US	UK
Yours, Dreamily,	Released: September 4, 2015; Label: Nonesuch Records; Format: LP, CD, digital	27	40
Electrophonic Chronic	Released: January 27, 2023; Label: Easy Eye Sound; Format: LP, CD, digital	—	—

=== EPs ===
Year	Title	Label
2015	The Arcs vs. The Inventors Vol. I	Nonesuch Records

=== Singles ===
Year	Title	Peak chart positions	Album
Year	Title	US AAA	Album
2015	"Stay in My Corner / Tomato Can"	—	Yours, Dreamily,
2015	"Outta My Mind / My Mind"	—	Yours, Dreamily,
2015	"Put a Flower in Your Pocket"	—	Yours, Dreamily,
2016	"Lake Superior"	—	Non-album single
2022	"Keep on Dreamin'"	—	Electrophonic Chronic
2022	"Heaven Is A Place"	—	Electrophonic Chronic
2022	"Eyez"	13	Electrophonic Chronic

=== Music videos ===
- "Outta My Mind"
- "Put a Flower in Your Pocket"
- "Keep on Dreamin'"
