= Rachel Keen =

Developmental psychologist

- Citizenship: American
- Occupation: Professor Emeritus
- Spouse: Charles Clifton (divorced)
- Awards: SRCD Distinguished Scientific Contribution Award (2005) Honorary degree from Uppsala University (2009)

Academic background
- Education: Berea College, University of Minnesota

Academic work
- Institutions: University of Virginia

Rachel Keen (born October 5, 1937, in Burkesville, Kentucky) is a developmental psychologist known for her research on infant cognitive development, auditory development, and motor control. She is professor emeritus of Psychology at the University of Virginia.

Keen received the 2005 Distinguished Scientific Contribution Award from the Society for Research in Child Development, and the 2018 Distinguished Contribution Award from the International Congress on Infant Studies. Keen received an Honorary degree from Uppsala University in 2009 and was honored by the Federation of Associations in Behavioral & Brain Sciences. She received the 2011 Award for Distinguished Service to Psychological Science from the American Psychological Association (APA).

Before 2002, she published under the name Rachel Keen Clifton.

== Biography ==
Keen received her B.A in Master of Arts from Berea College in 1959. She continued her education at the Institute of Child Development at the University of Minnesota, where she completed her Ph.D. in 1963, under the supervision of Harold W. Stevenson. Her dissertation used a non-nutritive sucking paradigm to study discrimination and habituation to tones in newborn infants. Keen was awarded an NICHD postdoctoral fellowship at the University of Wisconsin to continue her studies of newborn behavior using psychophysiological measures. While at the University of Wisconsin, she studied infant development under the supervision of Frances K. Graham. Their collaborative work explored attention in newborn infants, using heart rate activity as an indicator of habituation.

Keen was a long-standing member of the faculty at the University of Massachusetts (1968–2007) prior to joining the faculty of the University of Virginia in 2007. Her research career was supported by a Research Scientist Award from NIMH (1981–2001), and a MERIT award from NICHD (1999–2009). Her awards include the Distinguished Alumna Award from Berea College, and the Distinguished Faculty Award from the University of Massachusetts. Keen was awarded membership to the American Association for the Advancement of Science, and is a Fellow of the Association for Psychological Science, the Acoustical Society of America, the American Academy of Arts and Sciences, and the American Psychological Association.

== Research ==
Keen is known for pioneering scientific studies of infant cognition, with many of her experiments using habituation to study infants' developing perception and cognition. One of her most significant discoveries was that newborns remained habituated to auditory stimuli even after a delay of 24 hours. She replicated the findings years later using speech stimuli and behavioral responses. Her work suggested that long-term memory is well established in newborns, which was novel idea in 1965.

Keen and her colleagues also performed research on how premature newborns (gestational age 28 weeks to 32 weeks) reacted to painful stimulation (physiological and behavioral responses to heel-sticks). By observing facial expressions, cardiac reactions and movement durations, it was determined that the preterm newborns learned to anticipate the painful stimulus.

Some of her research on psychoacoustics focused on the auditory precedence effect. The auditory precedence effect refers to the judgment of a direction of a sound source, which depends on spatial information (i.e., where the sound is coming from). When two sounds are closely space in time, people often hear them as fused, and perceive them as coming from the direction of the first sound. Keen's research indicated that the auditory precedence effect was not present in two-month-old babies but was evident in older babies (four- to six-month-olds).

One line of Keen's research focused on how infants and young children solve problems. In a series of clever studies, Keen and colleagues explored problem solving by asking infants to grip various sound-emitting objects in the dark. By contrasting how infants solved problems in different lighting conditions, Keen was able to determine the extent to which infants were relying on vision to solve problems. These studies also demonstrated the infant's mental preparation to grasp objects varying in size even when the objects were no longer visible in the dark. Keen and her colleagues also looked at how infants adjusted their grips in preparation to use different tools. They found that by 14 months of age, infants were using different grips for different tools and action plans, suggesting that they were capable of planning in relation to a goal. Another one of her studies explored how instructions to visualize an event helped three-year-old children solve spatial problems. This study indicated that three-year-olds could use their imagination to help them to solve difficult problems.

== Representative Publications ==
- Clifton, R. K. (1974). Heart rate conditioning in the newborn infant. Journal of Experimental Child Psychology, 18(1), 9-21.
- Clifton, R. K. (1987). Breakdown of echo suppression in the precedence effect. The Journal of the Acoustical Society of America, 82(5), 1834–1835.
- Keen, R. (2003). Representation of objects and events: Why do infants look so smart and toddlers look so dumb? Current Directions in Psychological Science, 12(3), 79–83.
- Keen, R. (2011). The development of problem solving in young children: A critical cognitive skill. Annual Review of Psychology, 62, 1-21.
- Swain, I. U., Zelazo, P. R., & Clifton, R. K. (1993). Newborn infants' memory for speech sounds retained over 24 hours. Developmental Psychology, 29(2), 312–323.
