= Homer Steinweiss =

American drummer (born 1982)

- Born: March 25, 1982 (age 44); New York, New York, U.S.
- Genres: Funk, soul, R&B
- Occupations: Drummer; songwriter; session musician
- Instruments: Drums
- Years active: 1998-present
- Labels: Big Crown Records; Daptone; Truth and Soul Records
- Member of: Holy Hive; The Arcs; Menahan Street Band; El Michels Affair; others
- Formerly of: Sharon Jones & The Dap-Kings
- Website: www.homersteinweiss.com

Homer Steinweiss (born March 25, 1982) is an American drummer, songwriter, and producer known as a prominent drummer in the New York soul revival scene. He is a founding member and drummer of groups including Sharon Jones & the Dap-Kings, Lee Fields & the Expressions, Hardly Knew Ya, El Michels Affair, and Dan Auerbach's the Arcs, among many others. He leads the Brooklyn folk soul band Holy Hive with Paul Spring. A popular session musician as part of the Dap-Kings and in his own right, he is perhaps best known for his work with Mark Ronson and Amy Winehouse, with whom he recorded the 2006 album Back to Black.

== Early life ==
Steinweiss was born into a musical family in New York City. His parents worked in the jewelry business and were supportive of his interest in music. He began playing music in the early 1990s after watching a conga player in the jazz band at his sister's Manhattan high school. When his conga teacher became unavailable he switched to drums. Steinweiss was initially interested in grunge but an early drum teacher, Matt Patuto, guided him to the music of James Brown and the Meters.

In 2001, Steinweiss entered college at SUNY Purchase to study philosophy, though he already had an active musical career.

== Career ==
Steinweiss' career took off when he was only 16 after the Mighty Imperials released their first record, Thunder Chicken. The Mighty Imperials included Steinweiss on drums, bassist Nick Movshon, multi-instrumentalist Leon Michels (later founder of Truth and Soul Records), and singer Joseph Henry.

The Mighty Imperials' raw funk and soul sounds morphed into many collaborations including Sharon Jones & the Dap-Kings, El Michels Affair, Fabulous Three, Menahan Street Band, the Arcs, and others. In 2006, British producer Mark Ronson heard Sharon Jones & the Dap-Kings and asked the band to play a session with the then-unknown Amy Winehouse. These sessions became her album Back to Black.

Steinweiss has recorded and toured with artists such as Amy Winehouse, the Arcs, St. Vincent, Foreigner, the Kills, Bruno Mars, Lady Gaga, Sheryl Crow, and others.

== Personal life ==
Steinweiss is an illustrator and dog lover, a foodie and occasionally blogs about the food he finds.

== Discography ==
Adapted from AllMusic.

=== As band member ===
With the Mighty Imperials

- Thunder Chicken (2001)

With Sharon Jones & the Dap-Kings

- Dap Dippin' with Sharon Jones and the Dap-Kings (2002)
- Naturally (2005)
- 100 Days, 100 Nights (2007)
- I Learned the Hard Way (2010)
- Give the People What They Want (2014)
- It's a Holiday Soul Party (2015)
- Soul of a Woman (2017)

With Lee Fields & the Expressions

- Problems (2002)
- My World (2009)
- Faithful Man (2012)
- Emma Jean (2014)
- Special Night (2016)
- It Rains Love (2019)
- Big Crown Vaults Vol. 1 (2020)

With El Michels Affair

- Sounding Out the City (2005)
- The PJs... From Afar (with Raekwon) (2006)
- Walk On By (A Tribute to Isaac Hayes) EP (2009)
- Enter the 37th Chamber (2010)
- Loose Change EP (2014)
- Return to the 37th Chamber (2016)
- Adult Themes (2020)
- Clover (Original Motion Picture Soundtrack) (as the Diamond Mine)
- Yeti Season (2021)

With Menahan Street Band

- Make the Road by Walking (2008)
- The Crossing (2012)
- No Time for Dreaming (2011) (with Charles Bradley)
- Victim of Love (2013) (with Charles Bradley)
- Changes (2016) (with Charles Bradley)
- Black Velvet (2018) (with Charles Bradley)
- The Exciting Sounds of Menahan Street Band (2021)

With the Fabulous Three

- The Best of the Fabulous Three (2014)

With the Arcs

- Yours, Dreamily, (2015)
- The Arcs vs. the Inventors Vol. I EP (2015)

With the Olympians

- The Olympians (2016)

With Holy Hive

- Day Break (2017)
- Harping EP (2017)
- Float Back to You (2019)

=== As producer ===
- The Like – Release Me (2010) (additional producer, 3 tracks) (produced by Mark Ronson)
- Diane Birch – Speak a Little Louder (2013)
- Paul Spring – Towards a Center (2015)
- Monika – Secret in the Dark (2015)
- Mail the Horse – Planet Gates (2015)
- Max Shrager – Thoughts of You (2016)
- Erika Spring – Scars (2018)
- Doug Shorts – Casual Encounter EP (2019) (produced with Frank Dukes)

=== As sideman ===
- Amy Winehouse – Back to Black (2006) (produced by Mark Ronson)
- Mark Ronson – Version (2007) (produced by Mark Ronson)
- Naomi Shelton & the Gospel Queens – What Have You Done, My Brother? (2009)
- Daniel Merriweather – Love & War (2009)
- Aloe Blacc – Good Things (2010)
- Mark Ronson – Record Collection (2010) (produced by Mark Ronson)
- Michael Leonhart & the Avramina 7 – Seahorse and the Storyteller (2010)
- Rufus Wainwright – Out of the Game (2012) (produced by Mark Ronson)
- Saun & Starr – Look Closer (2015)
- Texas – Texas 25 (2015)
- Geoff Zanelli & Mark Ronson – Mortdecai (Music from the Motion Picture) (2015)
- The Frightnrs – "Gonna Make Time" from Nothing More to Say (2016)
- Lady Wray – Queen Alone (2016)
- Como Mamas – Move Upstairs (2017)
- The Sha La Das – Love in the Wind (2018) (as the Menahan Street Band)
- Grace Lightman – Silver Eater (2019)
- Hanni El Khatib – Flight (2020)
- Michael Leonhart & JSWISS – Bona Fide (2022)

== Credits ==
=== Drumming credits ===
Credits as a session musician.

List of tracks credited as the drummer, with details
| Title | Year | Artist | Album | Primary producer |
|---|---|---|---|---|
| "Rehab" | 2006 | Amy Winehouse | Back to Black | Mark Ronson |
| "You Know I'm No Good" | 2006 | Amy Winehouse | Back to Black | Mark Ronson |
| "Back to Black" | 2006 | Amy Winehouse | Back to Black | Mark Ronson |
| "Love Is a Losing Game" | 2006 | Amy Winehouse | Back to Black | Mark Ronson |
| "Wake Up Alone" | 2006 | Amy Winehouse | Back to Black | Mark Ronson |
| "He Can Only Hold Her" | 2006 | Amy Winehouse | Back to Black | Mark Ronson |
| "You Know I'm No Good" (Remix featuring Ghostface Killah) | 2006 | Amy Winehouse | Back to Black | Mark Ronson |
| "Do You Feel Me" | 2007 | Anthony Hamilton | American Gangster OST | Hank Shocklee |
| "Smile (Version Revisited)" | 2007 | Lily Allen | Alright, Still | Mark Ronson |
| "Valerie" (feat. Amy Winehouse) | 2007 | Mark Ronson | Version | Mark Ronson |
| "Apply Some Pressure" (feat. Paul Smith) | 2007 | Mark Ronson | Version | Mark Ronson |
| "The Only One I Know" (feat. Robbie Williams) | 2007 | Mark Ronson | Version | Mark Ronson |
| "Fried Chicken" (feat. Busta Rhymes) | 2008 | Nas | Nas | Mark Ronson |
| "6 O'Clock Blues" | 2008 | Solange | Sol-Angel and the Hadley St. Dreams | Mark Ronson |
| "Patches" | 2008 | The Saturday Knights | Mingle | Daptone |
| "Standing in the Rain" | 2008 | Al Green | Lay It Down | Questlove |
| "The Real Thing" | 2009 | Bebel Gilberto | All in One | Daptone |
| "The Slitter" | 2009 | Stone Cash Players | The Slitter / Necking | |
| "Baby (You've Got What It Takes)" (with Sharon Jones & The Dap-Kings) | 2009 | Michael Bublé | Crazy Love | Bob Rock/Daptone |
| "Some Kind of Wonderful" (bonus track) | 2009 | Michael Bublé | Crazy Love | |
| "Hollywood" (bonus track) | 2009 | Michael Bublé | Crazy Love | |
| "Fool For You Anyway" | 2010 | Foreigner | Can't Slow Down | |
| "Our Love Is Fading" | 2010 | Sheryl Crow | 100 Miles from Memphis | |
| "Eye to Eye" (feat. Keith Richards) | 2010 | Sheryl Crow | 100 Miles from Memphis | |
| "Summer Day" | 2010 | Sheryl Crow | 100 Miles from Memphis | |
| "Peaceful Feeling" | 2010 | Sheryl Crow | 100 Miles from Memphis | |
| "Georgia" | 2010 | CeeLo Green | The Lady Killer | |
| "It's My Party" | 2010 | Quincy Jones | Q Soul Bossa Nostra | |
| "Rave On" | 2011 | Julian Casablancas | Rave on Buddy Holly | Matt Sweeny |
| "Well All Right" | 2011 | Kid Rock | Rave on Buddy Holly | Matt Sweeny |
| "Will You Still Love Me Tomorrow? (2011)" | 2011 | Amy Winehouse | Lioness: Hidden Treasures | Mark Ronson |
| "Valerie ('68 Version)" | 2011 | Amy Winehouse | Lioness: Hidden Treasures | Mark Ronson |
| "Locked Out of Heaven" | 2011 | Bruno Mars | Unorthodox Jukebox | Mark Ronson |
| Specific tracks TBD | 2013 | Michael Bublé | To Be Loved | Bob Rock |
| "Ghost" | 2013 | Ella Henderson | To Be Loved | Ryan Tedder |
| "Bohemio" | 2014 | Pelirioja | Injusticia | |
| "Se Equivoco" | 2014 | Pelirioja | Injusticia | |
| "Te Wa' Tumbar" | 2014 | Pelirioja | Injusticia | |
| "Ciudad de Nadie" | 2014 | Pelirioja | Injusticia | |
| "Ingrata Conclusion" | 2014 | Pelirioja | Injusticia | |
| "Rattlesnake" | 2014 | St. Vincent | St. Vincent | |
| "Prince Johnny" | 2014 | St. Vincent | St. Vincent | |
| "Huey Newton" | 2014 | St. Vincent | St. Vincent | |
| "Digital Witness" | 2014 | St. Vincent | St. Vincent | |
| "I Prefer Your Love" | 2014 | St. Vincent | St. Vincent | |
| "Every Tear Disappears" | 2014 | St. Vincent | St. Vincent | |
| "Pieta" (bonus track) | 2015 | St. Vincent | St. Vincent | |
| "Sparrow" (bonus track) | 2015 | St. Vincent | St. Vincent | |
| "Heart Of Stone" | 2015 | Mario Biondi | Beyond Special | Dap-Kings |
| "Who To Blame" | 2015 | Emile Haynie | We Fall | |
| "Feel Right" (featuring Mystikal) | 2015 | Mark Ronson | Uptown Special | Mark Ronson |
| "I Can't Lose" (featuring Keyone Starr) | 2015 | Mark Ronson | Uptown Special | Mark Ronson |
| "In Case of Fire" (featuring Jeff Bhasker) | 2015 | Mark Ronson | Uptown Special | Mark Ronson |
| "Lay Me Down" (bonus track) | 2015 | Adele | 25 | Mark Ronson |
| "Trust In Me" | 2016 | Scarlett Johansson | The Jungle Book Original Soundtrack | Mark Ronson |
| "Perm" | 2016 | Bruno Mars | 24k Magic | |
| "Only Love" | 2016 | Andra Day | Cheers to the Fall | |
| "My Trigger" | 2016 | Miike Snow | III | Andrew Wyatt, et al. |
| "Genghis Khan" | 2016 | Miike Snow | III | Andrew Wyatt, et al. |
| "Lonely Life" | 2016 | Miike Snow | III | Andrew Wyatt, et al. |
| "Longshot (7 Nights)" | 2016 | Miike Snow | III | Andrew Wyatt, et al. |
| "Doing It To Death" | 2016 | The Kills | Ash & Ice | |
| "Heart Of A Dog" | 2016 | The Kills | Ash & Ice | |
| "Bitter Fruit" | 2016 | The Kills | Ash & Ice | |
| "Siberian Nights" | 2016 | The Kills | Ash & Ice | |
| "Black Tar" | 2016 | The Kills | Ash & Ice | |
| "Whirling Eye" | 2016 | The Kills | Ash & Ice | |
| "Telepathy" (feat. Nile Rodgers) | 2016 | Christina Aguilera | The Get Down (Original Soundtrack) | |
| "This Ain't No Fairy Tale" | 2016 | Justice Smith | The Get Down (Original Soundtrack) | |
| "Set Me Free" (feat. Nile Rodgers) | 2016 | Herizen Guardiola | The Get Down (Original Soundtrack) | |
| "Up The Ladder" | 2016 | Herizen Guardiola & Justice Smith | The Get Down (Original Soundtrack) | |
| "Zeke's Poem (I Am The One)" | 2016 | Justice Smith | The Get Down (Original Soundtrack) | |
| "Sinner's Prayer" | 2016 | Lady Gaga | Joanne | Mark Ronson |
| "Hey Girl" | 2016 | Lady Gaga | Joanne | Mark Ronson |
| "Just Another Day" | 2016 | Lady Gaga | Joanne | Mark Ronson |
| "Standing In The Rain" | 2016 | Action Bronson, Mark Ronson & Dan Auerbach | Suicide Squad (The Album) | Mark Ronson |
| "Price Of Fame" (also producer) | 2017 | Paloma Faith | The Architect | Homer Steinweiss |
| "What's The Word" | 2017 | Joe Fox | What's The Word / Night Walking | Leon Michels |
| "Στάλα" | 2017 | Monika | Στάλα | |
| "Flight 22" | 2018 | Kali Uchis | Isolation | |
| "Killer" | 2018 | Kali Uchis | Isolation | Wayne Gordon |
| "Facing East" | 2018 | 79.5 | Predictions | Leon Michels |
| "Predictions" | 2018 | 79.5 | Predictions | Leon Michels |
| "Fantasy" | 2018 | 79.5 | Predictions | Leon Michels |
| "Summer" | 2018 | The Carters | Everything is Love | Leon Michels, et al. |
| "The Arctic Circle" | 2018 | Michael Leonhart Orchestra | The Painted Lady Suite | |
| "The Internet" (also producer) | 2018 | Jon Bellion | Glory Sound Prep | |
| "Mah's Joint" (featuring Quincy Jones) | 2018 | Jon Bellion | Glory Sound Prep | |
| "Glimmer" | 2019 | Liam Gallagher | Why Me? Why Not. | Andrew Wyatt |
| "Late Night Prelude" | 2019 | Mark Ronson | Late Night Feelings | Mark Ronson |
| "Late Night Feelings" (featuring Lykke Li) | 2019 | Mark Ronson | Late Night Feelings | Mark Ronson |
| "Find U Again" (featuring Camila Cabello) | 2019 | Mark Ronson | Late Night Feelings | Mark Ronson |
| "Pieces of Us" (featuring King Princess) | 2019 | Mark Ronson | Late Night Feelings | Mark Ronson |
| "Knock Knock Knock" (featuring Yebba) | 2019 | Mark Ronson | Late Night Feelings | Mark Ronson |
| "When U Went Away" (featuring Yebba) | 2019 | Mark Ronson | Late Night Feelings | Mark Ronson |
| "Why Hide" (featuring Diana Gordon) | 2019 | Mark Ronson | Late Night Feelings | Mark Ronson |
| "Cipralex" | 2019 | Jack Peñate | After You | |
| "The Way That You Feel" | 2019 | Leif Vollebekk | New Ways | |
| "Wait A While" | 2019 | Leif Vollebekk | New Ways | |
| "Someone To Someone" (feat. The Sha La Das) | 2019 | Paul & The Tall Trees | So Long | Leon Michels, Thomas Brenneck |
| "Ask Me" | 2019 | Paul & The Tall Trees | So Long | Leon Michels, Thomas Brenneck |
| "These Walls" | 2019 | The Brand New Heavies | TBNH | Mark Ronson |
| "Sucker" | 2019 | Jonas Brothers | Happiness Begins | |
| "First" | 2019 | Jonas Brothers | Happiness Begins | |
| "Treat People With Kindness" | 2019 | Harry Styles | Fine Line | Jeff Bhasker |
| "Runaway" (feat. Homer Steinweiss) | 2020 | Sylvan Esso | Free Love | |
| "Bad Karma" (feat. Joan Jett) | 2020 | Miley Cyrus | Plastic Hearts | Mark Ronson |
| "Never Be Me" | 2020 | Miley Cyrus | Plastic Hearts | Mark Ronson |
| "Paper Thin" (also producer) | 2020 | Lianne La Havas | Lianne La Havas | |
| "Future Nostalgia" | 2020 | Dua Lipa | Future Nostalgia | Jeff Bhasker |
| "Sunblind" | 2020 | Fleet Foxes | Shore | |
| "Jara" | 2020 | Fleet Foxes | Shore | |
| "Maestranza" | 2020 | Fleet Foxes | Shore | |
| "Young Man's Game" | 2020 | Fleet Foxes | Shore | |
| "Smokin Out the Window" | 2021 | Silk Sonic | An Evening with Silk Sonic | |

=== As sampled artist ===
The earthy, retro grooves of the Menahan Street Band have been sampled by many artists including Jay-Z and Kendrick Lamar. El Michels Affair grooves have also been sampled by many artists including Wu-Tang Clan, Raekwon, Isaac Hayes, and others. Credits include:

- Eminem – "Groundhog Day" from The Marshall Mathers LP 2 (2013)
- Ludacris – "Not Long" from Ludaversal (2015)
- Travis Scott – "Antidote" from Rodeo (2015)

=== Film soundtrack ===
| Song | Year | Album | Co-artist(s) |
|---|---|---|---|
| "Grandma Calls the Boy Bad News" | 2025 | F1 the Album | Rachel Keen, Mark Ronson, Christopher Braun, Homer Steinweiss, Nick Movshon, Victor Axelrod |
