= Charles Bradley (singer) =

American singer (1948–2017)

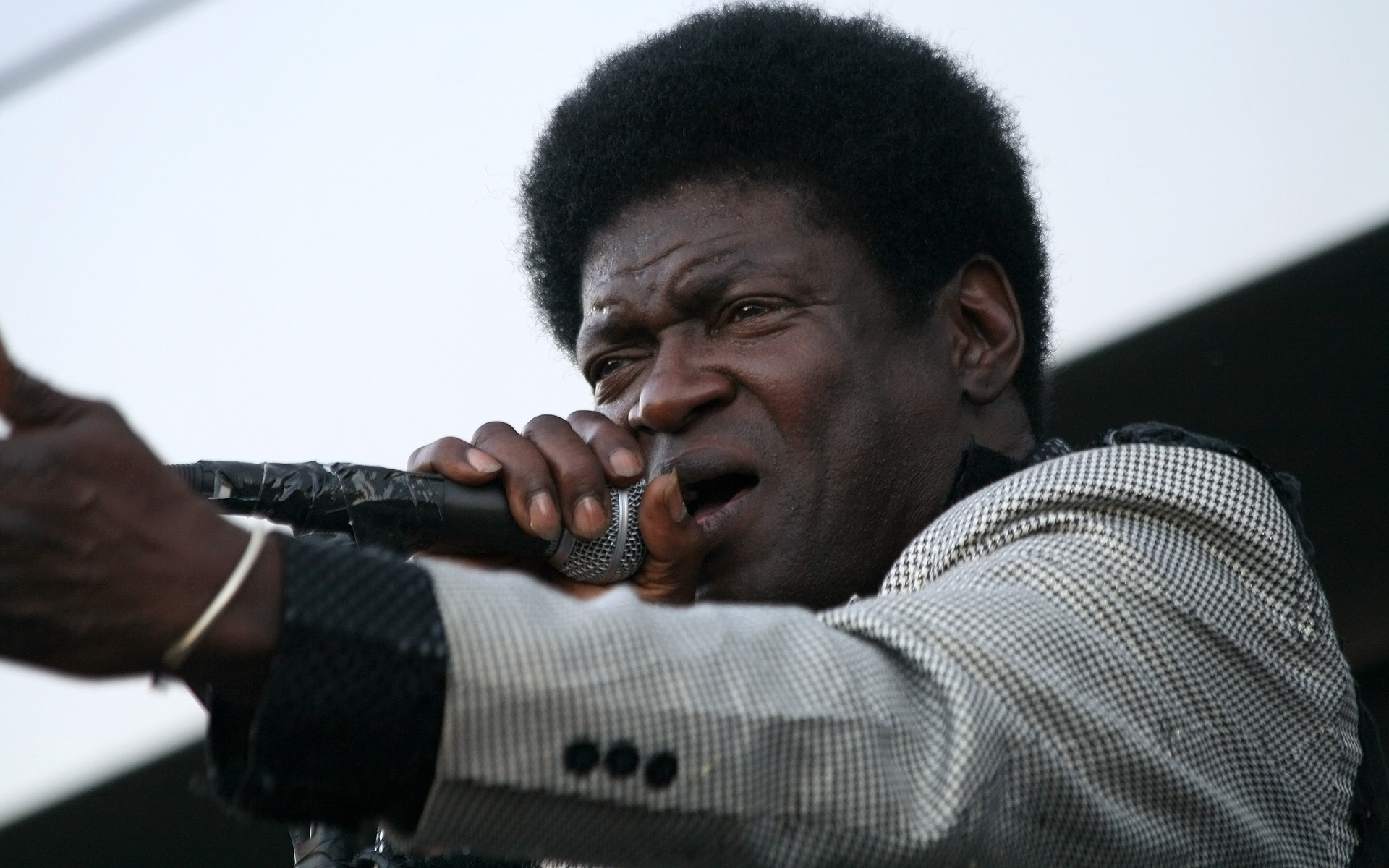
- Bradley at the 2011 Jazz Fest Wien

Background information
- Also known as: Screaming Eagle Of Soul; Black Velvet; James Brown Jr.
- Born: Charles Edward Bradley; November 5, 1948; Gainesville, Florida, U.S.
- Died: September 23, 2017 (aged 68) Brooklyn, New York, U.S.
- Genres: Funk; soul; retro-soul; rhythm and blues
- Occupations: Singer; songwriter
- Years active: 1965–2017
- Labels: Daptone Records; Dunham Records

Charles Edward Bradley (November 5, 1948 – September 23, 2017) was an American funk and soul singer. After years of obscurity and a part-time music career, Bradley came to prominence in the early 2000s. His performances and recording style were consistent with the revivalist approach of his main label Daptone Records, celebrating the feel of funk and soul from the 1960s and 1970s. One review said he "echoes the evocative delivery of Otis Redding".

Bradley was the subject of the documentary Soul of America which premiered at South by Southwest in 2012. He died of stomach cancer on September 23, 2017.

== Early life ==
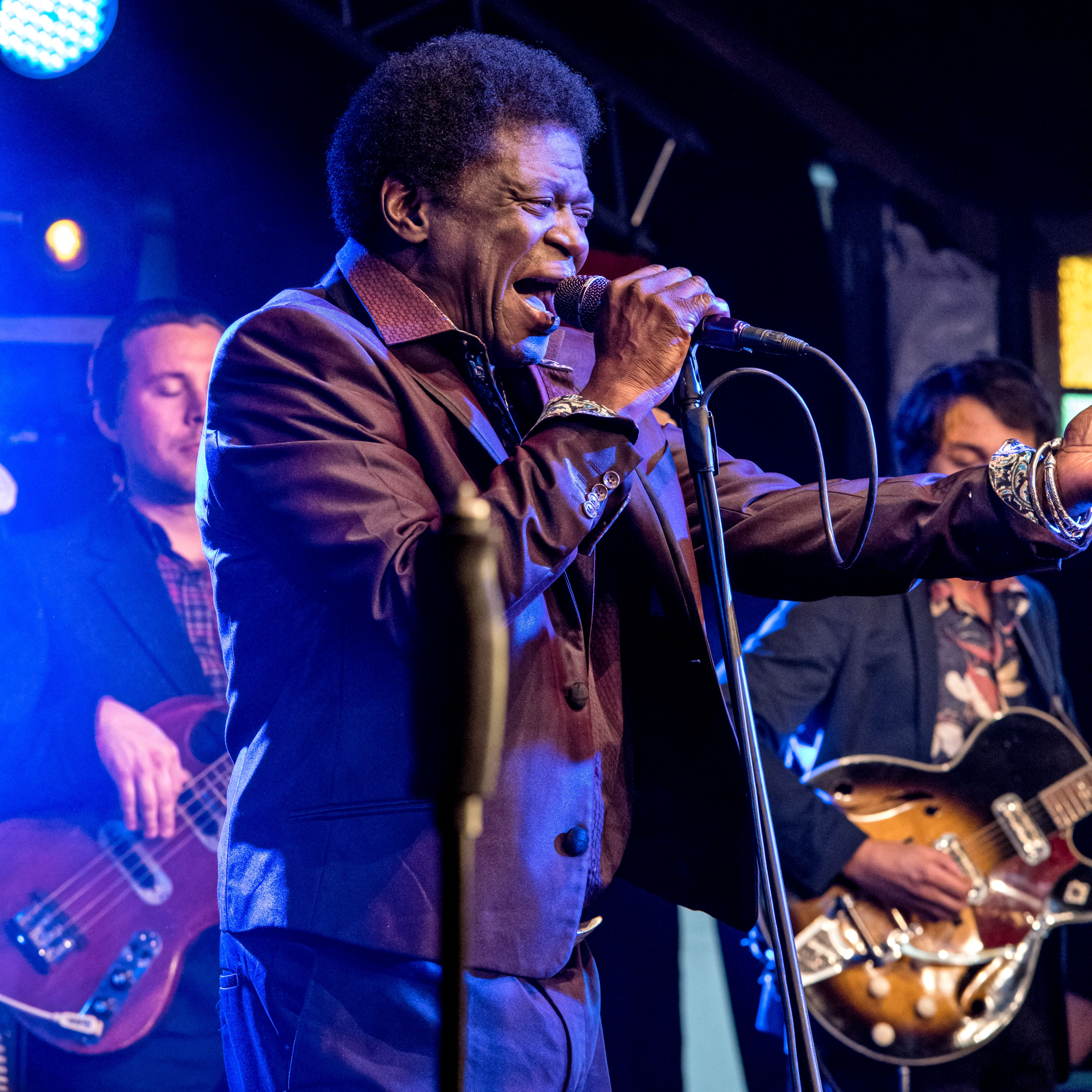
Zelt-Musik-Festival 2016 in Freiburg, Germany

Abandoned by his mother at eight months of age, Bradley was raised by his maternal grandmother in Gainesville, Florida. At age eight, his mother returned, and took him to live with her in Brooklyn, New York.

In 1962, his sister took him to the Apollo Theater to see James Brown perform. Bradley was so inspired by the performance that he began to practice mimicking Brown's style of singing and stage mannerisms at home.

When he was fourteen, Bradley ran away from home to escape poor living conditions—his bedroom was in a basement with a sand floor—and lived on the streets during the day and slept nights in subway cars for two years. Later, he enlisted in Job Corps which eventually led him to Bar Harbor, Maine to train as a chef. A co-worker told him he looked like James Brown and asked if he could sing; Bradley overcame his stage fright (when a crew member pushed him through the curtains onto the stage) and performed five or six times with a band. His bandmates were later drafted into the Vietnam War, and the act never re-formed.

Bradley worked in Maine as a cook for ten years, and then decided to head west, hitchhiking across the country. He lived in upstate New York, Seattle, Canada and Alaska before settling in California in 1977. There, Bradley worked odd jobs and played small shows for 20 years. He earned extra money doing James Brown performances, where he used such stage names as the Screaming Eagle of Soul, Black Velvet and even James Brown Jr.

== Career in music ==
=== Black Velvet and initial recordings (1996–2010) ===
In the mid-1990s, Bradley's mother called him and asked him to move back in with her in Brooklyn so she could get to know him. It was there he began making a living moonlighting as a James Brown impersonator in local clubs under the name Black Velvet. During this time, Bradley experienced more difficulties, including almost dying in a hospital after having an allergic reaction to penicillin, and, in a separate episode, awakening at his mother's house to a commotion as police and ambulances were arriving to the scene of his brother's murder close by.

While performing as Black Velvet, he was eventually discovered by Gabriel Roth (better known as Bosco Mann), a co-founder of Daptone Records. Roth introduced Bradley to his future producer, Daptone artist Tom Brenneck (then the songwriter and guitarist for The Bullets, and later for Menahan Street Band) who invited Bradley to his band's rehearsal. Bradley asked that the band simply perform while he made up lyrics on the spot. After writing several songs, Daptone released some of these initial recordings on vinyl starting in 2002.

=== No Time for Dreaming & Soul of America (2011–2012) ===
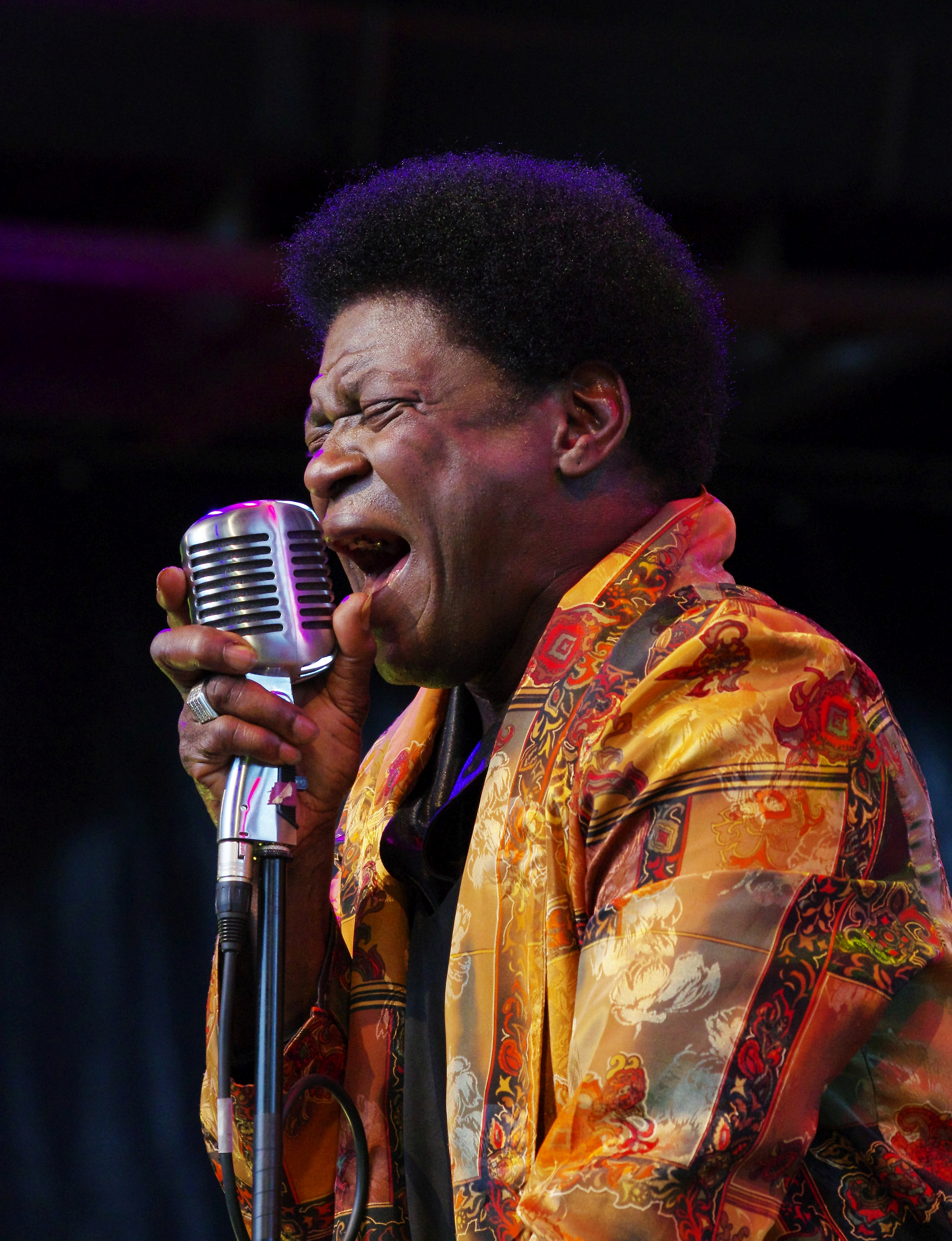
Bradley performing at Traumzeit-Festival in Duisburg in 2013.

Brenneck and Bradley chose ten of these recordings to be released as Bradley's debut album No Time for Dreaming in 2011.

In the spring of 2012, Charles Bradley: Soul of America, a documentary directed by Poull Brien, debuted at South by Southwest in Austin, Texas. Brien first met Bradley when he directed the music video for "The World (Is Going Up In Flames)". This feature film told Bradley's story from his childhood in Florida, to the days of homelessness and heartache, then later his gigs as Black Velvet, and finally ended with him touring and recording at Daptone Records. The film included his performance at festivals around the world.

=== Victim of Love & Changes (2013–2016) ===
Bradley's second album, Victim of Love came out on April 2, 2013.

Bradley's third album, Changes, was released on April 1, 2016, and featured a cover of the Black Sabbath song "Changes" along with the original song "Change for the World", which became popularized shortly after his death as the theme for the first three seasons of the Netflix animated comedy series Big Mouth. He continued to perform live, often together with other Daptone artists.

In August 2016, Bradley fell ill and canceled a Canadian tour and his appearance at the Cambridge Folk Festival due to take place on July 30.

== Death ==
Bradley died on September 23, 2017, of stomach cancer in Brooklyn, New York, at the age of 68. He was surrounded by family and friends, including members of all the bands he worked closely with.

Since his death Bradley has featured on several archive recordings, including a live-recording from the Apollo Theatre, as part of the Daptone Super Soul Revue release.

== Discography ==
=== Studio albums ===
Year	Album	Label & Catalog No.
2011	No Time for Dreaming	Daptone Records DAP-022 / Dunham DUN-1001
2013	Victim of Love	Daptone Records DAP-031 / Dunham DUN-1004
2016	Changes	Daptone Records DAP-041 / Dunham DUN-1005
2018	Black Velvet	Daptone Records DAP-054 / Dunham DUN-1007

=== Singles ===
Year	Title	Credited to	Label & Catalog No.
2002	"Take It as It Come, Pt. 1" / "Take It as It Come, Pt. 2"	Charles Bradley and Sugarman & Co.	Daptone Records DAP-1005
2004	"Now That I'm Gone (Look How You're Crying)" / "Can't Stop Thinking About You"	Charles Bradley and the Bullets	Daptone Records DAP-1014
2006	"This Love Ain't Big Enough for the Two of Us"	Charles Bradley and the Bullets	Daptone Records DAP-1021
2007	"The World (Is Going Up in Flames)" / "Heartaches and Pain"	Charles Bradley & Menahan Street Band / Charles Bradley	Daptone Records DAP-1034 / Dunham DNM-102
2008	"The Telephone Song"	Charles Bradley	Daptone Records DAP-1041 / Dunham DUN-103
2010	"No Time for Dreaming" / "Golden Rule"	Charles Bradley & Menahan Street Band	Daptone Records DAP-1055 / Dunham DUN-107
2010	"Every Day Is Christmas (When I'm Lovin' You)" / "Mary's Baby"	Charles Bradley featuring The Gospel Queens	Daptone Records DAP-1058 / Dunham DUN-109
2011	"Heart of Gold" / "In You (I Found a Love)"	Charles Bradley & Menahan Street Band	Daptone Records DAP-1059 / Dunham DUN-110
2012	"Stay Away" / "Run It Back"	Charles Bradley & Menahan Street Band / Menahan Street Band	Daptone Records DAP-1065 / Dunham DUN-111
2013	"Strictly Reserved for You" / "Let Love Stand a Chance"	Charles Bradley & Menahan Street Band	Daptone Records DAP-1070 / Dunham DUN-113
2013	"Confusion" / "Where Do We Go from Here"	Charles Bradley & Menahan Street Band	Daptone Records DAP-1073 / Dunham DUN-114
2013	"Changes" / "Ain't It a Sin"	Charles Bradley & The Budos Band / Charles Bradley & The Bullets	Daptone Records DAP-1076 / Dunham DUN-115
2014	"Luv Jones" / "Change, Change, Change"	Charles Bradley & LaRose Jackson	Daptone Records DAP-1080 / Dunham DUN-117
2016	"Change for the World" / "Revelations"	Charles Bradley / Menahan Street Band	Daptone Records DAP-1095 / Dunham DUN-118
2019	"Lonely as You Are"	Charles Bradley	Innit Recordings
2019	"Lucifer"	Charles Bradley	Innit Recordings

=== Other appearances ===
- "Take It As It Comes" from The Sugarman 3 album Pure Cane Sugar (2002)
- "Stay Away" (Nirvana cover) from Spin's Newermind album, a compilation of Nirvana covers (2011)
- Krampus (singing voice) American Dad!, episode "Minstrel Krampus" (2013)
- Himself (performing "Ain't It A Sin"), Luke Cage (2017)
- "Grant Green" from the Mr Jukes album God First (2017)
- "Otis" from Eddy Mitchell album La Même Tribu (2017)
- A cover of Sixto Rodriguez's "I'll Slip Away" on the compilation album Light in the Attic & Friends (2023)
