= Changes (Charles Bradley album) =

Studio album by Charles Bradley
- Released: April 1, 2016
- Genre: Soul
- Label: Daptone/Dunham
- Producer: Thomas Brenneck

Charles Bradley chronology
Victim of Love (2013)	Changes (2016)	Black Velvet (2018)

Singles from Changes
- 1. "Change for the World" Released: 2016

Changes is the third album released by American funk/soul singer Charles Bradley, released on April 1, 2016, on Daptone Records. The title track on the album is a cover of the Black Sabbath song of the same name and was first released as a Record Store Day Black Friday single in 2013.

== Critical reception ==
Professional ratings
Aggregate scores
Source	Rating
Metacritic	80/100
Review scores
Source	Rating
AllMusic	4/5 stars
American Songwriter	4/5 stars
Exclaim!	9/10 stars
Paste	7.9/10
Pitchfork	7.1/10
PopMatters	8/10 stars
Record Collector	4/5 stars

The album was released to positive critical reception with an aggregate score of 80 on Metacritic based on 17 reviews.

Pitchfork awarded the album a score of 7.1, with music critic Jay Balfour describing the album as Bradley's "most straightforward and best to date". AllMusic awarded the album a positive review, stating that "the rough-hewn power of Bradley's voice is at its most powerful, and there's a fierce sense of longing and need in this music that's almost tactile in its realism".

The Observer's Kitty Empire awarded the album three stars, likening Bradley to Al Green, while critic Steve Horowitz from PopMatters praised Bradley's vocal style, describing him as "the closest living equivalent to [James] Brown" and concluding that "Bradley sings of his aches and pleasures with such conviction that he makes one believe this is possible".

The album also received praise from a number of other musical publications, including American Songwriter, Record Collector and Paste.

=== Accolades ===
Publication	Accolade	Year	Rank
Mojo	The 50 Best Albums of 2016	2016	14
Paste	The 50 Best Albums of 2016	2016	43
Rough Trade	Albums of the Year	2016	5

== In other media ==
The theme song for Big Mouth is Bradley's cover of Black Sabbath's "Changes". The opening title sequence for the first three seasons of Barry uses the instrumental intro of Bradley's song "Change for the World".

== Track listing ==
No.	Title	Writer(s)	Length
1.	"God Bless America"	Menahan Street Band; Irving Berlin	1:31
2.	"Good to Be Back Home"	Menahan Street Band; Victor Axelrod; Charles Bradley; Thomas Brenneck; David Guy; Leon Michels; Homer Steinweiss	3:04
3.	"Nobody but You"	Menahan Street Band; Bradley; Brenneck; Guy; Michels, Nick Movshon; Steinweiss	4:00
4.	"Ain't Gonna Give It Up"	Menahan Street Band; Bradley; Brenneck; Guy; Michels; Movshon; Steinweiss	3:56
5.	"Changes"	The Budos Band; Geezer Butler; Tony Iommi; Ozzy Osbourne; Bill Ward	5:45
6.	"Ain't It a Sin"	The Budos Band; Brian Profilio	3:52
7.	"Things We Do for Love"	Menahan Street Band; Brenneck; William Schalda Jr.	3:31
8.	"Crazy for Your Love"	Menahan Street Band; Bradley; Brenneck	4:21
9.	"You Think I Don't Know (But I Know)" (featuring the Gospel Queens)	Menahan Street Band; Axelrod; Brenneck; Guy; Michels	3:30
10.	"Change for the World" (featuring the Gospel Queens)	Menahan Street Band; Bradley; Brenneck; Michels; Movshon; Steinweiss	3:36
11.	"Slow Love"	Menahan Street Band; Brenneck; Paul Schalda; Will Schalda	3:38
Total length:			40:44

== Personnel ==
- Charles Bradley – vocals

Menahan Street Band

- Victor Axelrod – piano/vibraphone
- Thomas Brenneck – guitar/bass guitar/organ/percussion
- Nick Movshon – bass guitar
- Homer Steinweiss – drums
- Michael Deller – organ
- David Guy – trumpet
- Leon Michels – saxophone/organ/flute

The Budos Band

- Jared Tankel – baritone saxophone
- Thomas Brenneck – electric guitar
- John Carbonella Jr. – congas, drums
- Mike Deller – organ
- Daniel Foder – bass guitar
- Andrew Greene – trumpet
- Rob Lombardo – bongos, congas
- Brian Profilio – drums
- Dame Rodriguez – percussion

The Gospel Queens

- Naomi Shelton – leading vocals
- Cliff Driver – pianist
- Bobbie Jean Gant – background vocals
- Edna Johnson – background vocals
- Gabriel Caplan – guitars
- Fred Thomas – bass
- Michael Post – drums

Additional musicians

- Raynier Jacildo – Organ on “God Bless America”
- William Schalda Jr. – Piano, Organ & Mellotron on "Things We Do for Love"
