= Black Velvet (Charles Bradley album) =

Studio album by Charles Bradley
- Released: November 9, 2018
- Genre: Soul
- Label: Daptone/Dunham
- Producer: Thomas Brenneck

Charles Bradley chronology
Changes (2016)	Black Velvet (2018)

Professional ratings
Aggregate scores
Source	Rating
Metacritic	78/100
Review scores
Source	Rating
AllMusic	3.5/5 stars
American Songwriter	4.5/5 stars
The Austin Chronicle	3/5 stars
Exclaim!	8/10
MusicOMH	4/5 stars

Black Velvet is the fourth and final studio album by American funk/soul artist Charles Bradley, released on 9 November 2018. The album release was preceded by two singles, "Can't Fight the Feeling" and "I Feel a Change". The name of the album comes from Bradley's stage name during his time as a James Brown impersonator. The album consists of songs originally recorded for Bradley's three previous studio albums, and was compiled by producer Thomas Brenneck after Bradley's death from cancer in September 2017. Included are covers of "Stay Away" by Nirvana and "Heart of Gold" by Neil Young.

== Track listing ==
No.	Title	Length
1.	"Can't Fight the Feeling"	2:48
2.	"Luv Jones"	3:51
3.	"I Feel a Change"	4:26
4.	"Slip Away"	3:32
5.	"Black Velvet"	3:29
6.	"Stay Away"	3:13
7.	"Heart of Gold"	3:03
8.	"(I Hope You Find) The Good Life"	5:11
9.	"Fly Little Girl"	3:19
10.	"Victim of Love"	4:39
Total length:		37:31

== Personnel ==
- Charles Bradley – vocals

Menahan Street Band

- Victor Axelrod – piano/vibraphone
- Thomas Brenneck – guitar/bass guitar/organ/percussion
- Nick Movshon – bass guitar
- Homer Steinweiss – drums
- Michael Deller – organ
- David Guy – trumpet
- Leon Michels – saxophone/organ/flute

== Charts ==
Chart (2018)	Peak position
Belgian Albums (Ultratop Flanders)	40
Dutch Albums (Album Top 100)	154
French Albums (SNEP)	182
Scottish Albums (Official Charts)	93
Swiss Albums (Schweizer Hitparade)	75
US Independent Albums (Billboard)	7
