= Dave Guy =

American trumpeter (born 1978)

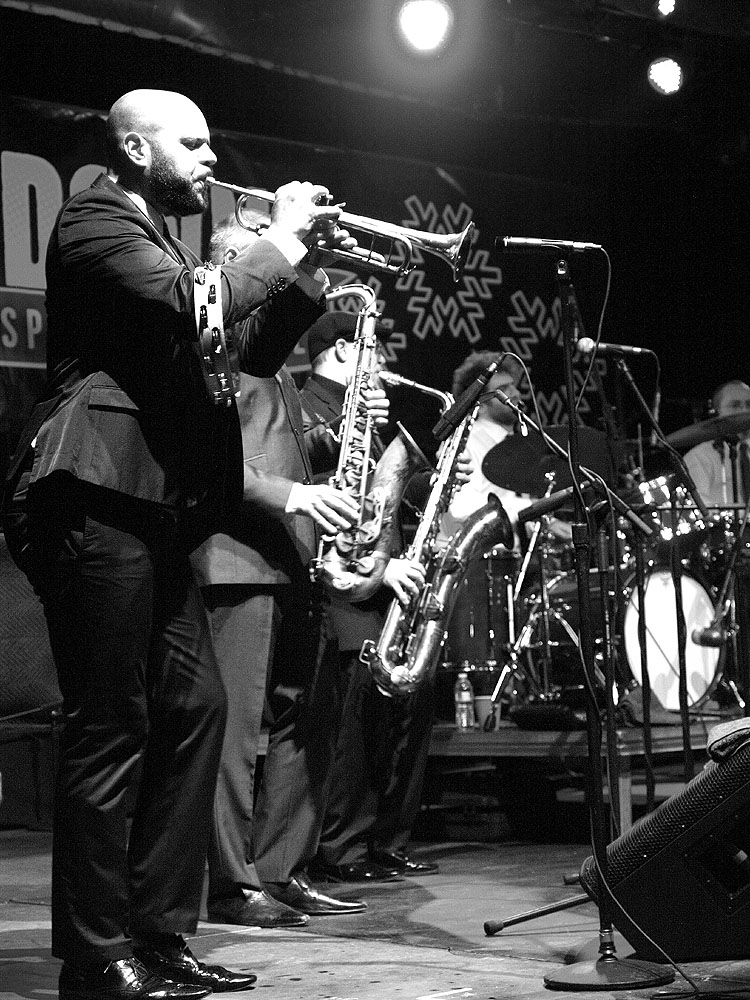
- Guy (foreground) with The Dap-Kings in 2010.

Background information
- Born: December 9, 1978 (age 47); Brooklyn, New York, U.S.
- Occupation: Musician
- Instrument: Trumpet
- Years active: 1995–present
- Member of: The Roots; Menahan Street Band; El Michels Affair; Lee Fields & The Expressions
- Formerly of: Sharon Jones & the Dap-Kings; Antibalas; Dujeous

David Anthony Guy (born December 9, 1978) is an American trumpet player. Since 2014, he has played with The Roots, including on The Tonight Show Starring Jimmy Fallon. Over his more than two decade career, he has been part of the groups Sharon Jones & The Dap-Kings, Menahan Street Band, The Budos Band, and Lee Fields & The Expressions, among others. A prolific touring and session musician, he often works with producer Mark Ronson and can be heard playing on tracks including "Valerie" and "Uptown Funk."

Guy has also played with Antibalas, The Sugarman 3, El Michels Affair, and Charles Tolliver's Big Band, and toured as part of Amy Winehouse's band. As part of Sharon Jones & the Dap-Kings, he was nominated for the Grammy Award for Best R&B Album in 2014.

Guy was born and raised in Manhattan. He attended LaGuardia High School and studied music performance at the Manhattan School of Music and The New School, graduating in 2000. While still in high school, he formed the hip hop band Dujeous.

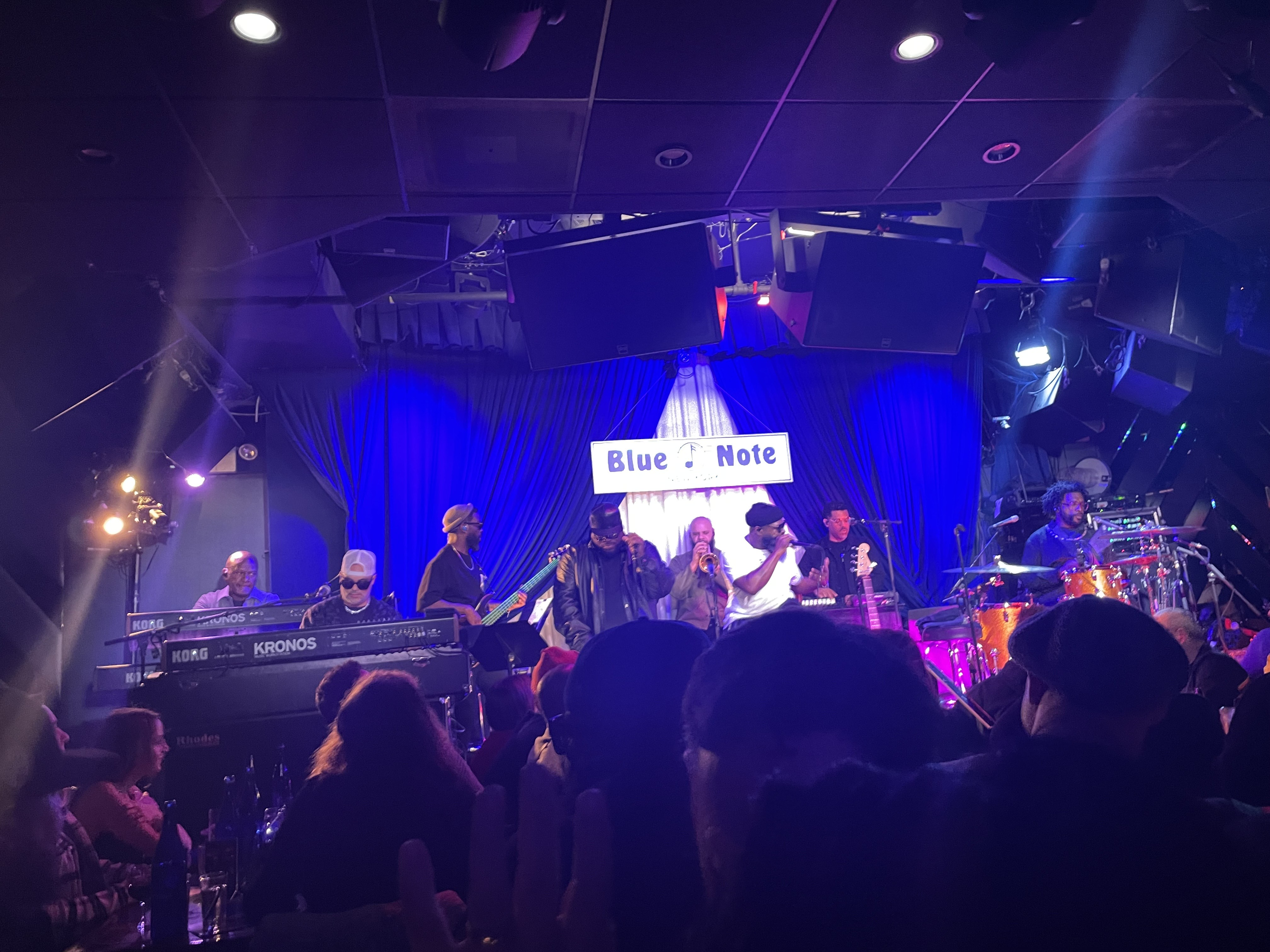
Dave Guy (middle, trumpet) with The Roots at The Blue Note, NYC, in 2025

== Discography ==
=== As leader ===
- Ruby, Big Crown Records, 2024

=== As featured ===
- "Visions" - Norah Jones, 2024
- "New Year's Eve Polka [5-4-3-2-1]", "Hey Rudy" - Jimmy Fallon / The Roots / Weird Al Yankovic, 2024
- "Boy Kills World [Songs From the Original Motion Picture] - El Michels Affair, 2024
