= Soul Run =

Studio album by Tanika Charles
- Released: May 10, 2016
- Genre: Soul, R&B
- Label: Record Kicks
- Producer: Matt “Emdee” Reid; 2nd Son; Slakah the Beatchild; Daniel Lee; Christopher Sandes; Jesse Bear; Tanika Charles; Anthony Corsi; Sean Nimmons; Simon Hamilton

Tanika Charles chronology
What?What!What?! (2010)	Soul Run (2016)	The Gumption (2019)

Singles from Soul Run
- 1. "Soul Run" Released: October 30, 2015; 2. "Two Steps" Released: April 13, 2016; 3. "Endless Chain" Released: May 19, 2017; 4. "Love Fool" Released: October 5, 2017

Soul Run is the debut full-length album from Canadian R&B artist Tanika Charles, first released independently in Canada on May 10, 2016, and internationally on April 7, 2017, through Record Kicks. It was long-listed for the 2016 Polaris Music Prize and nominated for the 2017 Juno Awards R&B/Soul Recording of the Year alongside The Weeknd, Daniel Caesar, dvsn and PARTYNEXTDOOR. Shortly after self-releasing the album in Canada, Tanika Charles signed with Italian funk/soul label Record Kicks. The international release that followed in 2017 included the additional song “Sweet Memories”.

The album was supported by the singles “Soul Run”, “Two Steps”, “Endless Chain” and "Love Fool”. Videos for “Soul Run” and “Endless Chain” were co-directed by Taha Muharuma and Shanik Tanna. A behind-the-scenes tour video for “Two Steps” was edited by Michael Warren and filmed by Jon Foster during Tanika Charles & The Wonderful's first European tour in December 2017.

Copies of the album are available on CD and LP, as well as across all streaming and digital download music services. The singles “Soul Run” and “Endless Chain” were made available on limited edition 7” vinyl.

== Release and reception ==
Professional ratings
Review scores
Source	Rating
Exclaim!	8/10
Uncut	8/10
Echoes	4/5 stars
Mojo	}
Music Republic	5/5 stars

Soul Run was widely praised in Canadian media. In his Exclaim! review, Ryan B. Patrick called it “…fresh, funky and freeing, a solid soul standout that sets the groundwork for future releases to follow.” Christine Clarke at Now Magazine said listeners will be “…instantly drawn in by her charisma.” CBC Music featured Tanika Charles and her band The Wonderful's in a First Play Live episode, where songs from the Soul Run album were premiered in front of an intimate studio audience.

International reviewers would later agree, such as Music Republic Magazine lauding Soul Run as ”one of the very best soul releases this year thus far, and for a long time, in fact.” Albumism noted it was "...bursting with promise and relatable, down to earth lyrics of love, life and liberation." While interviewing Ad-Rock and Mike D on his NPR podcast, legendary New York radio DJ Bobbito Garcia told his guests that he “…heard Tanika Charles and it just reminded me of that Beastie Boys deep funk, raw soul era.”

Songs from Soul Run have been featured in numerous television and film placements including Kim’s Convenience, Workin’ Moms, Love Jacked as well as a KFC commercial.

== Track listing ==
Soul Run
No.	Title	Writer(s)	Producer(s)	Length
1.	"Intro"	Tanika Charles	Michael Warren	1:12
2.	"Soul Run"	Charles; Robert Bolton	Matt “Emdee” Reid; 2nd Son; Slakah the Beatchild^{[a]}	3:28
3.	"Two Steps"	Charles; Daniel Lee	Daniel Lee; Christopher Sandes^{[a]}	3:46
4.	"More Than A Man"	Charles; Slakah the Beatchild	Slakah the Beatchild	3:35
5.	"Money"	Charles; Bolton	Jesse Bear	2:53
6.	"Sweet Memories^{[b]}"	Charles; Zaki Ibrahim	Tanika Charles; Christopher Sandes^{[a]}	3:47
7.	"Love Fool"	Charles; Divine Brown; I James Jones	Slakah the Beatchild	3:17
8.	"Heavy"	Charles; Jones	Anthony Corsi; Sean Nimmons; Simon Hamilton; Slakah the Beatchild^{[a]}	3:28
9.	"Endless Chain"	Charles; Jones	Slakah the Beatchild	3:50
10.	"Waiting"	Charles; Slakah the Beatchild	Slakah the Beatchild	3:28
11.	"Darkness and the Dawn"	Charles	Slakah the Beatchild	4:02
Total length:				33:15

Notes

- ^{^[a]} signifies an additional production.
- ^{^[b]} not included on Canadian release.
- Mixed by Michael Warren, except "Love Fool" mixed by Slakah the Beatchild.
- Mastered by Bryan Lowe at João Carvalho Mastering, except “Sweet Memories” mastered by Gianluca Pighi at Pitgilus Studio.

== Personnel ==
Credits compiled from the liner notes of Soul Run and Tanika Charles' website.

- 2nd Son - producer
- Adam Risbridger - additional vocals
- Alex St. Kitts - bass
- Anthony Corsi - producer
- Ben Foran - guitar
- Bryan Lowe - mastering
- Christopher Sandes - producer, keys, engineer
- Daniel Lee - songwriter, producer, engineer
- Divine Brown - songwriter, additional vocals
- Fabio Conti - additional layout
- Gianluca Pighi - mastering
- I James Jones - songwriter, additional vocals
- Jacob Hanania - additional vocals
- Jamie Drake - percussion, vibraphone
- Jay Hay - saxophone
- Jennifer Balance - makeup
- Jeremy Strachan - horn arrangements, saxophone
- Jesse Bear - producer
- Jesse Ohtake - management
- Kevin Howley - drums, percussion, engineer
- L’oqenz - additional vocals
- Marlon James - horns
- Matt “Emdee” Reid - producer
- Michael Warren - producer, engineer, management
- Octavio Santos - horns
- Robert Bolton - songwriter
- Ryan Paterson - photography, design
- Sean Nimmons - producer
- Shaun Brodie - trumpet
- Simon Hamilton - producer
- Slakah the Beatchild - songwriter, producer, engineer, additional vocals
- Tanika Charles - vocals, songwriter, producer
- Tao M. Lau - management
- Zaki Ibrahim - songwriter, additional vocals
