= Kokolo Afrobeat Orchestra =

American Afrobeat band

KOKOLO
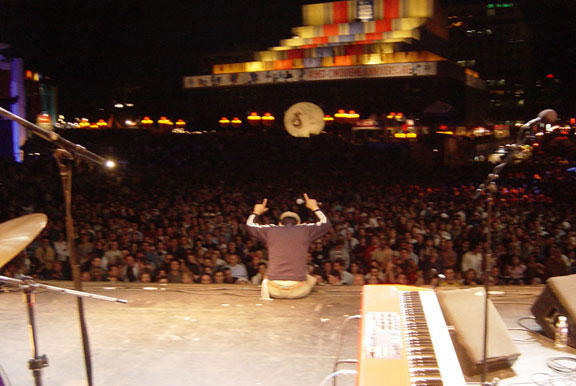
- Kokolo performing at the Montreal International Jazz Festival, 2004

Background information
- Origin: New York City, U.S.
- Genres: Afrobeat/Afrofunk, Afro disco
- Years active: 2001–present
- Labels: Afrokings, Freestyle, Record Kicks, Little Boat, Peace & Rhythm
- Members: Ray Lugo – vocals Chris Morrow – trombone Kavin Paulraj – bass Neil Chastain – drums Ando Kal – guitar
- Website: kokolonyc.com

Kokolo (/kəˈkoʊloʊ/ kə-KOH-loh), also known as the Kokolo Afrobeat Orchestra, is an American Afrobeat band from the Lower East Side of New York City, formed in 2001 by songwriter/producer Ray Lugo.

Along with the Daktaris and Antibalas, they form part of the early New York Afrobeat scene that ignited the genre's current global revival.

== Name origin ==
The band's name was taken from a 1970s term, "cocolo", that originated in parts of the Caribbean and was later used in New York City's Latin communities, often as a pejorative, to describe non-Hispanic African descendants, many of whom were fans of Afro music. Kokolo aimed to invert the negative connotation of the term through the positivity in their music.

== History: From punk to Afrofunk ==
=== Fuss and Fight ===
Prior to founding Kokolo, Lugo's musical background was rooted in New York's downtown hardcore punk and rock scenes, associating with groups such as Bad Brains, Agnostic Front, Cro-Mags, Gorilla Biscuits, Jawbreaker, Youth of Today, Anthrax, Leeway and Warzone. Warzone's lead singer, Raymond "Raybeez" Barbieri was a close personal friend of Lugo and an early mentor on the ins-and-outs of independent music, inspiring the DIY ethic that would become a key characteristic of Kokolo.

By the summer of 1995, Lugo ran Underhanded Studios, a recording facility on Ludlow Street which he shared with Mark Anthony Thompson from Chocolate Genius, Sim Cain from the Rollins Band and Yuka Honda (Cibo Matto/Sean Lennon) . While at Underhanded, Lugo befriended Bosco Mann and Phillip Lehman, who soon recorded the first albums for Desco Records at Underhanded and who would go on to release the Daktaris album, which spearheaded the Afrobeat revival in New York. Also during this time, while producing King Chango's debut recordings, Lugo recruited Martin Perna and Mike Wagner as the group's horn section. Perna and Wagner would go on to form Antibalas, along with percussionist Fernando Velez (Sharon Jones & The Dap-Kings), another former King Chango alumni.

Lugo's search for a new musical direction let him to form Kokolo in the spring of 2001, enthused by the template of his friends in Antibalas and informed by the music of Fela Kuti, James Brown and the Fania All-Stars and by the live power of groups like Bad Brains, The Clash and Mano Negra.

Initially a traditional Afrobeat ensemble, the group consisted of 14 members from various parts of the world, and as a result of a revolving door of musicians coming in and out of the group, the initial months proved frustrating at tightening up the group as a live unit. During this time Lugo met English Trombonist Chris Morrow, the only other original member currently in the group.

In the summer of 2001, Lugo turned to Gabe Roth to produce Kokolo's debut album "Fuss And Fight", so called because Lugo wanted to denote the friction and internal bickering going on within the group at that time. Recorded at Daptone Studios in Brooklyn, featuring some of the musicians in Antibalas and released on the UK Label AfroKings, "Fuss And Fight" quickly gained the band a following, in particular with European audiences, due in part to the relative novelty of the genre, but also due to their high-energy performances and undeniable talent, and the band soon toured the UK for the first time. Prior to this maiden tour and a result of internal disagreements, most of the initial group left to form the Akoya Afrobeat Ensemble.

Finding themselves stuck with an upcoming tour and no band, Roth came to the rescue by connecting Lugo and Morrow with longtime collaborator and former Fela Kuti/Manu DiBango drummer Jojo Kuo, enabling them to carry on with the tour.

=== More Consideration ===
Initially panned by critics, "Fuss And Fight" drew its share of negative, or at the very least, suspicious, press upon its release. Long accustomed to Fela-esque prototypes, purists found the group's radical take on Afrobeat not to their liking. Although initially stung by the lukewarm response, Lugo quickly set off to write Kokolo's second album during a stay in Amsterdam in 2003, noting only the criticisms from a selected number of writers whose opinion he respected, more inspired than ever to solidify an original sound for the group.

The result was the critically acclaimed More Consideration, which featured more complex orchestrations and sophisticated compositions. The album benefited from the participation of players such as Charlie Hunter, Gabe Roth (Sharon Jones & The Dap-Kings), Mike Weitman (Project Logic) and Jojo Kuo (Fela Kuti/Manu DiBango), and was released by London taste-maker Adrian Gibson's Freestyle Records imprint in 2004.

The enthusiastic response to More Consideration allowed the band to reach a broader audience and to perform on some of the world's premier stages, from the main stage of The Montreal International Jazz Festival, Glastonbury Festival and scores of others around the world, where they shared the spotlight with acts ranging from Roots Manuva, Manu DiBango, Taj Mahal, Isaac Hayes, Zap Mama and Gilles Peterson to Chic, Pete Rock, The Itals, Bloodhound Gang, Roy Ayers and Seun Kuti and Egypt 80.

Also during this time, the group began to experiment with remixes of their original songs, something which some found somewhat taboo, but was viewed by the band as another vehicle with which to reach listeners. To date Kokolo has been remixed by Faze Action, BeatFanatic, Lack Of Afro, Diesler and many others.

=== Love International ===
Kokolo's third album, "Love International" continued to expand the group's sound as Lugo incorporated elements of Hip Hop, Dancehall and a more pronounced Latin influence throughout the songs. The group's "Afro" version of The Clash's "The Magnificent Seven", a nod to one of Lugo's musical heroes, was well received by DJ's around the world and featured Jamaican dancehall artist Joe Daddz on lead vocals.

"Love International", released in July 2007 on Freestyle Records, confirmed that Kokolo possessed "Our Own Thing", as one of the album's more driving songs proclaimed, and helped the band tour a number of new countries as a result, and were the first group to bring live Afrobeat music to countries such as Lithuania, Latvia, Estonia, Bulgaria and Romania, among others.

=== Heavy Hustling ===
The band's fourth studio album, "Heavy Hustling", found them meshing Fela Kuti poly-rhythms and Fania All-Star cadence into a number of James Brown classics, with Lugo providing original vocals, turning classics like "Soul Power" into tongue-in-cheek come ons through lyrical plays on sexual themes and a marked emphasis on West-African Afrofunk.

"I thought it would be interesting to make explicit the implicit connection that exists between Nigerian Afrobeat and American Funk and explore the musical dialogue that took place across the Atlantic during that golden era, a dialogue that also included the New York Latin sound, which was also highly regarded and influential in Africa at the time", states Lugo.

"Heavy Hustling" was released on the Milan-based Record Kicks label in February 2009 and the band soon followed its release with its most extensive tour schedule to date.

=== 100 Fevers ===
Kokolo continued to further expand their sound via the group's fifth studio album, "100 Fevers", released in January 2017. The work featured songs influenced by Afrodisco, contemporary club rhythms and West-African Afrofunk.

In 2017, German Hip-Hop supergroup Fünf Sterne deluxe featured a sample of Kokolo's "The Way Up" on a song and video titled "Afrokalle", from the band's album, "Flash".

"Kokolo vs.Terricos", a vinyl EP of remixes of music by both groups was released in November 2018 on American label Peace & Rhythm.

== Style and influences ==
Originally formed as a traditional Afrobeat ensemble, Kokolo quickly developed a far spikier sound, often played faster and more emphatically than many of their contemporaries. They have also proven adept at broadening their sound by incorporating influences from a variety of other genres. Although Kokolo sing in English primarily, they have released several numbers sung in Spanish and Portuguese.

Lugo's songwriting approach is largely informed by punk, rock and reggae, and contrary to many contemporary Afrobeat groups' reliance on more "Jazzy" instrumentals, Kokolo's songs feature re-occurring vocal choruses, which are designed to engage and energize audiences at live shows.

Their live performances also vary drastically from that of their peers, as Kokolo's shows are more frenzied and akin to rock concerts, another indication of the influence of groups like Bad Brains and Mano Negra on the group.

The group has over 50 releases and is included in international compilations with artists such as Femi Kuti, Ska Cubano, Tony Allen, U-Roy, Caetano Veloso, Masters At Work, Quantic, Salif Keita, Gerardo Frisina, Baaba Maal, Jazztronik, Zero 7, Afro Celt Sound System, Joe Bataan, Common, The Orb, and Eric B & Rakim.

Kokolo are also notable as practitioners of the Simple Living lifestyle, and followers of the writings of J. Krishnamurti, whose concepts heavily influenced the lyrics on the band's second album, "More Consideration", as exemplified by the maxim found on their album jackets: "Live More, Consume Less.. With More Joy and Less Stress". They have donated songs, performed and raised funds on behalf of scores of projects ranging from Youth empowerment organizations to AIDS relief groups and environmental causes.

== Discography ==
=== Albums ===
Album	Label	Year of release	Available formats
The Best Of	Little Boat	2017	iTunes
100 Fevers	Little Boat/Peace & Rhythm	2016	LP, iTunes
Remixed Worldwide	Little Boat	2013	iTunes
En Español	Little Boat	2011	iTunes
Heavy Hustling	Little Boat	2009	iTunes
Love International	Little Boat	2007	iTunes
More Consideration	Little Boat	2004	iTunes
Fuss and Fight	Little Boat	2002	iTunes

=== 12" singles | EPs ===
12" single | EP	Label	Year of release	Available formats
Kokolo vs. Terrificos EP	Peace & Rhythm	2018	LP
The Magnificent Seven EP	Shiftin' Gears	2010	LP
Nueva York 12" Malena Rework	Freestyle	2007	LP
Balkan Beat Box split EP	Sol Selectas	2008	LP
Sabroso 12"	Freestyle	2005	LP
Roy Davis Jr. split EP	Jamayka	2005	LP
More Consideration EP	Freestyle	2005	LP
Mister Sinister 12"	Jamayka	2004	LP
Root to the Fruit 12"	Freestyle	2004	LP

=== 7" singles ===
7" single	Label	Year of release	Available formats
Afrika Man (feat. Jojo Kuo)	Record Kicks	2009	7"
Soul Power	Record Kicks	2008	7"
Girls on Film	Record Kicks	2008	7"
The Magnificent Seven	VampiSoul	2008	7"
The Way Up	Tramp	2007	7"
Our Own Thing	Freestyle	2007	7"
Heaven	AfroKats	2007	7"
Each One Teach One	AfroKats	2006	7"
Donkey	Afrokings	2002	7"

=== Compilations featuring Kokolo ===
Compilation	Label	Year of release	Available formats
Club Anthems: The Cure and the Cause	Vanilla OMP	2012	iTunes
Afro Club Night 2	Kittball Records	2012	CD, LP
Plaintaste of Funk	Piola Libri	2011	CD
Contemporary Afrobeat	Tramp	2011	CD, LP
Soulshaker Vol. 7	Record Kicks	2010	CD, LP
Kokolo: Pegao Pegao	Radio Pirata	2010	CD
Dancers Masterpiece	P-Vine	2010	CD
City Lounge 7	Wagram	2010	CD, iTunes
Deep Funk Vol. 3	La Suite	2010	CD, iTunes
Mo' Record Kicks	Record Kicks	2010	CD, iTunes
Soul Shaker Vol. 6	Record Kicks	2009	CD, iTunes
H2G Japan	H2G Factory	2009	CD
Planet Up the Planet	Planetwize	2009	CD, iTunes
Funk Aid for Africa	Dubspot	2009	CD, iTunes
Republica Afrobeat 3	Love Monk	2009	CD, iTunes
Balearic Beach Sessions	Cool Pool	2009	CD, iTunes
Afrobeat Club	Union Square Music	2009	CD, iTunes
Rough Guide to Afrobeat Revival	World Music Network	2009	CD, iTunes
Soul Shaker Vol. 5	Record Kicks	2008	CD, iTunes
Funkanova	Prominence	2008	CD, iTunes
Collected Singles Vol. 5	Freestyle	2008	CD, iTunes
Collected Singles Vol. 2	Freestyle	2008	CD, iTunes
Collected Singles Vol. 1	Freestyle	2008	CD, iTunes
Nu Afro	Wagram	2007	CD, iTunes
Soul Shaker Vol. 4	Record Kicks	2007	CD, iTunes
The Afro Sound of House	Traxsource	2007	CD, iTunes
Timeless Anthems	Jetstar	2006	CD, iTunes
Feel the Beat: Afrofunk	Big Sur	2006	CD
Freestyle Remixed	Freestyle	2006	CD, iTunes
Loft Party	Kinky Sweet	2006	CD, iTunes
Beginners Guide to Afro Lounge	Nascente	2006	CD
Africa 100	Pitchfork Media	2005	CD
Afrique C'est Chic Box Set	Kinky Sweet	2005	CD
Even Nice Girls	Public Release	2005	CD
Frequent Flyer Mile High	Kinky Sweet	2005	CD, iTunes
Afrique C'est Chic 3	Slip 'N Slide	2005	CD, iTunes
Future World Funk...On the Run	Ether	2005	CD, iTunes
House Afrika	House Afrika	2004	CD
Afrobeat Sudan Aid Project	Modiba	2004	CD
One Love Vol. 1	Pure Hemp	2004	CD
African Xpress	Shakti/Virgin	2003	CD
Big Daddy Volume 3: The Showstopper	Big Daddy	2002	CD
Live from WFMU	WMFU	2002	CD
