= Chabad hipsters =

Chabad hipsters (or hipster Hasidim) are the cross-acculturated members of the Chabad Hasidic community and contemporary hipster subculture. Beginning from the late 2000s through the 2010s, a minor trend of cross acculturation of Chabad Hasidism and hipster subculture appeared within the New York Jewish community. The first printed reference to this trend was the 2007 New York Press cover story, "Hipster Hassids" by Alyssa Pinsker. Later, according to The Jewish Daily Forward, a small number of members of the Chabad Hasidic community, mostly residing in Crown Heights, Brooklyn, appear to now have adopted various cultural affinities of the local hipster subculture.

== Background ==
Cultural similarities between some of the Hasidic community's members and New York City hipsters were noted on blogs such as Hasid or Hipster (inspired in part by the art of Elke Reva Sudin).

According to The Jewish Daily Forward, a number of members of the Crown Heights Chabad community, all while adhering to the norms of Orthodox dress codes, have incorporated contemporary fashion as a part of their daily appearance.

There's a whole new style trend among people I call "hipster Hasids". Chic young women (because they're not limited to the black pants-white shirt uniform of their male peers) routinely wear close-fitting tops, tight, knee-length skirts, and high heels.

— Debra Nussbaum Cohen, The Jewish Daily Forward

Similarly, The New York Times noted that some New York hipsters appeared to be appropriating local Chabad Hasidic fashion by wearing black fedora hats. Some hipsters reported purchasing their headwear from Hasidic shops in Brooklyn. Closely associated with the adoption of the "black hat", the preference for long skirts by female hipsters in New York are believed to be partly inspired by the fashion of Hasidic women.

Chabad fashion designers Mimi Hecht and Mushky Notik who started their Mimu Maxi brand in the summer of 2013, originally with the Hasidic female community in mind, but soon the brand had gained a broader, loyal following. The pair has been referred to as "Hasidic Hipsters" on social media, and they have responded positively to that label.

One Crown Heights resident established an eatery called "Hasid+Hipster". The eatery serves artisanal dishes while adhering to the laws of Kashrut. The owner, Yuda Schlass, told The New York Jewish Week "Me, myself, as much as I'm chasidic, I'm also hipster". "Mason and Mug", a similarly styled "kosher-artisanal" restaurant was established in Crown Heights/Prospect Heights.

Chabad hipster musicians, such as Moshe Hecht and DeScribe, have fused Jewish themes and contemporary music styles and genres. Similarly, the band Zusha, often described as Hasidic hipsters, mixes contemporary musical styles like folk, jazz, and reggae with the wordless vocals of traditional Hasidic songs (known as niggunim). The group cites as a spiritual advisor Rabbi Dov Yonah Korn of New York City's East Village Chabad House.

Chabad on Campus rabbi Simcha Weinstein, whose activities are based at Pratt Institute, has been termed one of "New York's Hippest Rabbis".

== Outreach ==
Chabad emissaries operating in "hipster neighborhoods" have sought to reach out to Jewish hipsters and encourage them to perform traditional Jewish rituals and commandments (or mitzvahs). One event, titled "Unite the Beards", with the stated aim of "bridging the two communities", was organized by Chabad emissaries in Brooklyn.

Chabad emissaries have established centers and organized services and events for young unaffiliated Jews in Dumbo, Williamsburg/Greenpoint, Fort Greene/Clinton Hill, Carroll Gardens and Prospect Heights.

=== "Hipster synagogues" ===
The Soho Synagogue, established by Chabad emissaries in SoHo, Manhattan, was often branded as a "hipster synagogue." The synagogue was housed in a former "chic clothing store." It closed down after failing to keep up financially.

Chabad of Bucktown- Wicker Park in Chicago has been noted as the synagogue of one of "America’s Best Hipster Neighborhoods." The Chabad house attracts a number of local Jews to services and events.

== See also ==
- Matisyahu
- Punk Jews (2012)
- Y-Love
- Mipsterz
