= The Gumption =

Studio album by Tanika Charles
- Released: May 10, 2019
- Genre: Soul, R&B
- Label: Record Kicks
- Producer: Kevin Henkel; Marlon James; DJ Kemo; Hunter Pearson; Chin Injeti; Daniel Lee

Tanika Charles chronology
Soul Run (2016)	The Gumption (2019)

Singles from The Gumption
- 1. "Love Overdue" Released: April 5, 2019; 2. "Tell Me Something" Released: June 14, 2019; 3. "Look At Us Now" Released: October 4, 2019

The Gumption is the second full-length album from Canadian R&B artist Tanika Charles, released on May 10, 2019, through Record Kicks. It was long-listed for the 2019 Polaris Music Prize and nominated for the 2020 Juno Awards R&B/Soul Recording of the Year.

The album was supported by the singles "Love Overdue", "Tell Me Something", and "Look At Us Now", each of which were accompanied by video directed by V.T. Nayani. The album was announced with an animated teaser video for the song "Cadillac Moon" created by Aline Helmcke on March 11, 2019.

Copies of the album are available on CD and LP, as well as across all streaming and digital download music services. The single "Love Overdue" was made available on limited edition 7" vinyl.

== Release and reception ==
Professional ratings
Review scores
Source	Rating
Exclaim!	7/10
Pop Matters	7/10
Albumism	4.5/5 stars
Belfast Telegraph	8/10
Financial Times	3/5 stars

The Gumption received critical acclaim upon release.

== Track listing ==
The Gumption
No.	Title	Writer(s)	Producer(s)	Length
1.	"Tell Me Something"	Tanika Charles; Michael Warren	Kevin Henkel	3:05
2.	"Going Home"	Charles; Robert Bolton	Marlon James	3:07
3.	"Love Overdue"	Sean "D/SHON" Henderson	DJ Kemo; Hunter Pearson	3:07
4.	"Remember to Remember"	Charles; Bolton	DJ Kemo; Chin Injeti	3:02
5.	"Cool Scorpio"	Charles; Bolton	Daniel Lee	4:07
6.	"Dans les Nuages"	Charles; Daniel Lee	Lee	2:48
7.	"Cadillac Moon"	Charles; Bolton	James	1:48
8.	"Upside Down"	Charles; Bolton	James	2:46
9.	"First & Last"	Charles; Warren	Lee	2:40
10.	"Look At Us Now"	Charles; Warren	Henkel	4:07
11.	"Since You Been Gone"	Charles; Bolton; Warren	Henkel	3:06
12.	"Always Restless"	Marlon James	James	3:32
Total length:				37:40

Notes

- Mixed by Michael Warren. Mastered by Bryan Lowe at João Carvalho Mastering.

== Personnel ==
Credits compiled from the liner notes of The Gumption and Tanika Charles' website.

- Alex Gamble - engineer
- Ben Foran - guitar
- Bryan Lowe - mastering
- Chin Injeti - producer, multiple instruments
- Clayton Connell - keys
- Daniel Lee - songwriter, producer, engineer, multiple instruments
- David Longenecker - upright bass
- Dennis Paterson - engineer
- DJ Kemo - producer, engineer, multiple instruments
- Eoin McManus - keys
- Hunter Pearson - producer, multiple instruments
- Jennifer Balance - makeup
- Jeremy Morgan - drums
- Kevin Henkel - producer, engineer, multiple instruments
- Lenny Solomon - string arrangements, violin
- Marlon James - songwriter, producer, engineer, multiple instruments
- Michael Warren - songwriter, engineer, management
- Miku Graham - additional vocals
- Nick Papadakis - viola
- Robert Bolton - songwriter
- Sean "D/SHON" Henderson - songwriter, additional vocals
- Taha Muharuma - photography, design
- Tanika Charles - songwriter, vocals
- Wendy Solomon - cello
