= Ray Lugo =

American musician

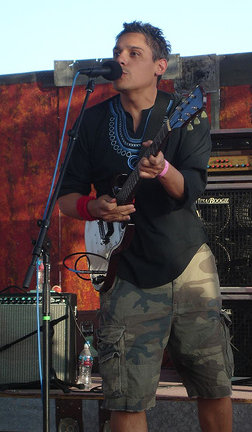
- Lugo performing at the 2005 Glastonbury Festival

Background information
- Born: November 15, 1967 (age 58); Caracas, Venezuela
- Origin: New York City, U.S.
- Genres: Afrobeat; Afrofunk; boogaloo; electronic
- Occupations: Musician, record producer
- Instruments: Vocals, guitar, bass, percussion
- Years active: 1987–present
- Labels: Freestyle, Record Kicks, Little Boat, Fania, Warner, Ubiquity Records, Dutch East India Trading, Peace & Rhythm, Ammonite
- Member of: Kokolo Afrobeat Orchestra
- Formerly of: Ray Lugo & The Boogaloo Destroyers
- Website: raylugo.com

Ray Joseph Lugo (born November 15, 1967) is an American musician. Singing in English and Spanish, Lugo is internationally known for his prolific output and diverse solo work, as well as for leading the groups Kokolo Afrobeat Orchestra, Ray Lugo & The Boogaloo Destroyers and other projects.

== Early life ==
Lugo was born in Caracas, Venezuela. His father, Olmedo Lugo, is a Venezuelan lawyer, journalist, and author of Spanish descent. His mother, Lumen Palma, a former secretary, is of Spanish, Italian and Native American descent. As an unwed mother, Lugo's mother, ostracized by her family and facing discrimination from conservative society, left for the United States shortly after his birth. Lugo credits his mother's lifelong love of Classical music for inspiring his interest in the arts. As a child, he was a big fan of Chopin's "Nocturnes".

== Career ==
=== Early years ===
Lugo grew up on New York City's Lower East Side, a few blocks from CBGB's, immersed in between the harsh environment that was the city's reality throughout the 1970s and the variety of the art and music scenes centered around downtown Manhattan.

In his early teens, Lugo was a B-boy, immersed in the Big Apple's nascent hip-hop, graffiti and breakdancing cultures. The rise of punk rock and the intermingling taking place in underground New York City clubs like Danceteria, The Roxy NYC and Save the Robots in the early 1980s drew Lugo towards the emerging hardcore scene largely based around CBGB's through his association with a number of pioneering bands in the genre, such as Warzone, whom he managed as a teen, Agnostic Front, Bad Brains, Leeway, Youth of Today, Gorilla Biscuits and others. While in college at New York University, Lugo befriended guitarist Blake Schwarzenbach and drummer Adam Pfahler, who invited Lugo to serve as first vocalist for the earliest incarnation of emo legends Jawbreaker. One of their band's first performances was as opening act for a play written and performed by Adam's sister, Kembra Pfahler of The Voluptuous Horror of Karen Black and her then husband and guitarist, Samoa Moriki.

In the early to mid-1990s, Lugo ran a small independent label out of a recording studio on Ludlow Street where he drew inspiration from the eclectic variety of groups and musicians associated with the studio, such as Chocolate Genius, Sim Cain, Marc Ribot Cibo Matto, and an early incarnation of Sharon Jones & The Dap Kings. Lugo also produced the first recordings and served as live-show hype man for Latin-ska band King Chango during that band's initial stages, with the relationship souring after a legal dispute over control of those initial recordings following the band's signing to David Byrne's Luaka Bop Label. During his time working with King Chango, Lugo befriended producer Bosco Mann and Saxophonist Martin Perna as college students and invited them to play in the band, prior to them forming influential groups like The Daktaris and Antibalas as well as Daptone Records, largely reviving global interest in funk, soul and Afrobeat.

=== Kokolo ===
In 2001, Lugo formed Kokolo, after becoming interested in the Afrobeat music of Nigeria's Fela Kuti. Kokolo became part of the new wave of Afrobeat groups that emerged in New York in the early 2000s and would go on to play concerts globally and collaborate with artists such as Fela Kuti & Egypt 80/King Sunny Ade drummer Jojo Kuo, Jazz guitarist Charlie Hunter, Antibalas, Faze Action and many others. The band has released five studio albums: 2002's Fuss and Fight, 2004's More Consideration, 2007's Love International, 2009's Heavy Hustling and 2016's 100 Fevers. The group has been featured in international compilations, alongside artists like Femi Kuti, Ska Cubano, Tony Allen, U-Roy, Caetano Veloso, Masters at Work, Quantic, Salif Keita, Gerardo Frisina, Baaba Maal, Jazztronik, Zero 7, Afro Celt Sound System, Joe Bataan, Common, The Orb, Eric B & Rakim and many more.

=== Boogaloo Destroyers ===
In 2011, Lugo formed the group Ray Lugo & The Boogaloo Destroyers, centering their sound around 1960s golden-era Boogaloo, a style that was a precursor to salsa in New York City. The band's first album, Mi Watusi, was well received by fans and critics internationally. The second studio album, ¡Que Chevere! saw its release in 2014 and the album proved instrumental in expanding the group's appeal to a new range of fans and critics internationally, culminating in a Summer 2015 show at New York's Lincoln Center, where the band performed with pianist Richie Ray as well as with Boogaloo pioneer Pete Rodriguez, who performed live for the first time in over 30 years.

Coucou Boogaloo, the third studio album by Ray Lugo & The Boogaloo Destroyers was released in 2025.

=== Solo ===
2012 saw the release of Lugo's first solo album We Walk Around Like This, on which he highlighted his expanding eclectic tastes. The album featured tones and sounds from locations he felt to be of particular importance to the history of groove-based music, such as Bahia, Lagos, Kingston, San Juan, and Harlem. The album provided Lugo the opportunity to embark on a solo world tour that featured concerts in the U.S., Canada, South America, Europe, Asia, Australia and New Zealand.

In 2016, Lugo provided lead vocals and collaborated with Latin percussionist and bandleader Roberto Roena on Aquarembe by Bosq Y La Candela All-Stars, seeing it released on Fania Records. Lugo's second solo album, 2017's Now, highlighted a nod towards more electronic tones and his search for new approaches.

In 2017, Lugo collaborated with German Hip-Hop supergroup Fünf Sterne deluxe on a song and video titled "Afrokalle", featured on the band's album, Flash.

In January 2018, Lugo embarked on a solo tour of Asia featuring DJ Sets and live performances in Vietnam, Singapore, Cambodia, Thailand and China.

April 2018 saw the release of "Pegate Pa' Ca", a song by Bosq featuring lead vocals by Ray Lugo. The track was part of Bosq's Love and Resistance album which was released on Ubiquity Records.

Lugo released a new album, entitled Family Remixes, in August 2018. The album, released on blue vinyl via Ammonite Records, comprised remixed interpretations of Lugo's "Now" album by producers from Australia, Serbia, Portugal, England, Italy, Puerto Rico and other countries.

=== Terrificos ===
Working with Cleveland film composer Jake Fader, Lugo formed a new project dubbed "Terrificos" in 2015. The group's sound centers on intertwining influences from South American genres such as Chicha, Cumbia with dance elements and cinematic soundscapes. The duo's first studio album, Go South was well embraced.

A vinyl EP, entitled "Kokolo vs.Terricos" and containing remixes of music by both groups was released in November 2018 on American label Peace & Rhythm.

== Personal life ==
In 2009, Lugo married French Psychotherapist Rachel Jedwab. The couple live with their two children, as well as two older children from Lugo's previous marriage, and split time between the United States and France.

Lugo has held a lifelong interest in the discourses of Buddha, Krishnamurti, Rajneesh and the Tao Te Ching and feels these have helped him become more balanced in life.

In his spare time, Lugo runs a soccer league for children with special needs and follows Spain's La Liga and England's Premier League.

== Discography ==
=== Studio albums ===
Album	Label	Year of release	Available formats
Ray Lugo & The Boogaloo Destroyers Coucou Boogaloo	Little Boat	2025	LP,iTunes
Ray Lugo Family Remixes	Little Boat/Ammonite	2018	LP, iTunes
Kokolo 100 Fevers	Little Boat/Peace & Rhythm	2017	LP, iTunes
Ray Lugo Now	Little Boat	2017	iTunes
Terrificos Go South	Little Boat/Peace & Rhythm	2016	LP, iTunes
Kokolo Remixed Worldwide	Little Boat	2015	iTunes
Ray Lugo & The Boogaloo Destroyers ¡Que Chevere!''	Freestyle	2014	LP, iTunes
Kokolo En Español	Little Boat	2013	iTunes
Ray Lugo We Walk Around Like This	Little Boat	2012	LP, iTunes
Ray Lugo & The Boogaloo Destroyers Mi Watusi	Little Boat	2011	LP, iTunes
Kokolo Heavy Hustling	Little Boat	2009	iTunes
Kokolo Love International	Little Boat	2007	iTunes
Kokolo More Consideration	Little Boat	2004	iTunes
Kokolo Fuss And Fight	Little Boat	2002	iTunes

=== 12" singles | EPs ===
12" single | EP	Label	Year of release	Available formats
Kokolo vs. Terrificos Remix EP	Peace & Rhythm	2018	LP
Ray Lugo – Bahia Love EP	Jazz & Milk	2012	LP
Kokolo – The Magnificent Seven EP	Shiftin' Gears	2010	LP
Kokolo – Nueva York 12" Malena Rework	Freestyle	2007	LP
Kokolo – Balkan Beat Box Split EP	Sol Selectas	2008	LP
Kokolo – Sabroso 12"	Freestyle	2005	LP
Kokolo – Roy Davis Jr. Split EP	Jamayka	2005	LP
Kokolo – More Consideration EP	Freestyle	2005	LP
Kokolo – Mister Sinister 12"	Jamayka	2004	LP
Kokolo – Root To The Fruit 12"	Freestyle	2004	LP
Ice Cream Headache – Ice Cream Headache"	Underhanded	1995	CD

=== 7" singles ===
7" single	Label	Year of release	Available formats
Ray Lugo & The Boogaloo Destroyers - ¡Que Chevere! (My Baby's Got Latin Soul)	Freestyle	2014	7"
Ray Lugo & The Boogaloo Destroyers – El Ritmo De Nueva York	Freestyle	2014	7"
Ray Lugo & The Boogaloo Destroyers – Swingy Boogaloo	Freestyle	2011	7"
Ray Lugo's L.E.S. Express – Love Me Good	Record Kicks	2010	7"
Ray Lugo's L.E.S. Express – I Dream Of Bahia	Record Kicks	2009	7"
Kokolo – Afrika Man (Feat. Jojo Kuo)	Record Kicks	2009	7"
Kokolo – Soul Power	Record Kicks	2008	7"
Kokolo – Girls On Film	Record Kicks	2008	7"
Kokolo – The Magnificent Seven"	VampiSoul	2008	7"
Kokolo – The Way Up	Tramp	2007	7"
Kokolo – Our Own Thing	Freestyle	2007	7"
Kokolo – Heaven"	AfroKats	2007	7"
Kokolo – Each One Teach One"	AfroKats	2006	7"
Kokolo – Donkey"	Afrokings	2002	7"
Militant – Come In Peace"	Underhanded	1996	7"
Twin Barrels Burning – Digging A Hole"	Dutch East India Trading	1992	7"

=== Compilations featuring Ray Lugo Music ===
Compilation	Label	Year of release	Available formats
New York Fever	Wagram	2017	CD, iTunes
The Craig Charles Funk & Soul Club, Vol. 3	Freestyle	2014	CD, iTunes
Footprints	Jazz & Milk	2014	LP, CD, iTunes
The Rough Guide To Latin Rare Groove	WMN	2014	CD, iTunes
Lounge Anthology	Wagram	2013	CD, iTunes
The Greatest Latin Party	X5	2013	iTunes
Fiesta Latina	X5	2013	iTunes
Top Latin Remix	Six Degrees	2013	CD, iTunes
10th Anniversary	Record Kicks	CD< 2013	iTunes
I Love Lounge	Wagram	2012	CD, iTunes
Globaltronica	X5	2012	CD, iTunes
Club Anthems: The Cure and The Cause	Vanilla OMP	2012	iTunes
Afro Club Night 2	Kittball Records	2012	CD, LP
Plaintaste Of Funk	Piola Libri	2011	CD
Contemporary Afrobeat	Tramp	2011	CD, LP
Soulshaker Vol. 7	Record Kicks	2010	CD, LP
Kokolo: Pegao Pegao	Radio Pirata	2010	CD
Dancers Masterpiece	P-Vine	2010	CD
City Lounge 7	Wagram	2010	CD, iTunes
Deep Funk Vol. 3	La Suite	2010	CD, iTunes
Mo' Record Kicks	Record Kicks	2010	CD, iTunes
Soul Shaker Vol. 6	Record Kicks	2009	CD, iTunes
H2G Japan	H2G Factory	2009	CD
Planet Up The Planet	Planetwize	2009	CD, iTunes
Funk Aid For Africa	Dubspot	2009	CD, iTunes
Republica Afrobeat 3	Love Monk	2009	CD, iTunes
Balearic Beach Sessions	Cool Pool	2009	CD, iTunes
Afrobeat Club	Union Square	2009	CD, iTunes
Rough Guide To Afrobeat Revival	World Music Network	2009	CD, iTunes
Soul Shaker Vol. 5	Record Kicks	2008	CD, iTunes
Funkanova	Prominence	2008	CD, iTunes
Collected Singles Vol. 5	Freestyle	2008	CD, iTunes
Collected Singles Vol. 2	Freestyle	2008	CD, iTunes
Collected Singles Vol. 1	Freestyle	2008	CD, iTunes
Nu Afro	Wagram	2007	CD, iTunes
Soul Shaker Vol. 4	Record Kicks	2007	CD, iTunes
The Afro Sound Of House	Traxsource	2007	CD, iTunes
Timeless Anthems	Jetstar	2006	CD, iTunes
Feel The Beat: Afrofunk	Big Sur	2006	CD
Freestyle Remixed	Freestyle	2006	CD, iTunes
Loft Party	Kinky Sweet	2006	CD, iTunes
Beginners Guide To Afro Lounge	Nascente	2006	CD
Africa 100	Pitchfork Media	2005	CD
Afrique C'est Chic Box Set	Kinky Sweet	2005	CD
Even Nice Girls	Public Release	2005	CD
Frequent Flyer Mile High	Kinky Sweet	2005	CD, iTunes
Afrique C'est Chic 3	Slip 'N Slide	2005	CD, iTunes
Future World Funk...On The Run	Ether	2005	CD, iTunes
House Afrika	House Afrika	2004	CD
Afrobeat Sudan Aid Project	Modiba	2004	CD
One Love Vol. 1	Pure Hemp	2004	CD
African Xpress	Shakti/Virgin	2003	CD
Big Daddy Volume 3: The Showstopper	Big Daddy	2002	CD
Live From WFMU	WMFU	2002	CD
