= Better Get Ready =

Studio album by Moshiach Oi!
- Released: June 20, 2009
- Genre: Jewish rock, hardcore punk
- Length: 29:52
- Label: Shemspeed, Shabasa
- Producer: Mike Wagner

Moshiach Oi! chronology
Better Get Ready (2009)	This World is Nothing (2011)

Better Get Ready is the debut studio album by American Hasidic punk band Moshiach Oi!. The album, produced by guitarist Mike Wagner and mastered by Don Fury, was released on June 20, 2009 through Shemspeed Records and the band's own Shabasa Records.

== Reception ==
Emily Savage of Jweekly described the album as "Simple, straight-forward, unabashed scroll-loving lyrics. All yelled at maximum volume of course." Alex Suskind of The Forward said, "Moshiach Oi! has found a divine balance of religion and rock [and] uses the traditional punk sound of raucous guitars and boisterous vocals to explore Jewish ideals and values." Patrick Aleph of Jewcy summarized Better Get Ready as "a blistering punk rock siddurim that effortlessly ties together Black Flag and Rambam, 7 Seconds and the Rebbe, The Casualties and the Kabballists."

== Track listing ==
No.	Title	Length
1.	"Baruch Hashem"	0:38
2.	"All Praise"	1:34
3.	"Shabbos"	1:41
4.	"We Want Moshiach Now"	1:22
5.	"Yetzer Hara"	0:41
6.	"I Wanna Learn Torah"	1:12
7.	"Amalek"	2:12
8.	"This Is My God"	1:29
9.	"Hashem S'fasai Tiftach"	1:45
10.	"Better Get Ready"	2:35
11.	"Avoda Zara"	3:44
12.	"I Love Torah"	3:45
13.	"Am Yisroel Chai"	3:06
14.	"Shema Yisroel"	3:12
15.	"Moshiach Oi!"	0:56

== Personnel ==
=== Moshiach Oi! ===
- Yishai Romanoff – lead vocals, guitar, drums
- Mike Wagner – guitar, vocals
- Mitchell "Mordechai" Harrison – bass guitar, vocals
- Paul Alpert – drums on "I Love Torah" and "Moshiach Oi!"

=== Other ===
- Mike Wagner – producer, engineering, mixing
- Don Fury – mastering
- Rabbi Moshe Wilkominsky – spoken word intro on "Shabbos"
- Gavriel Saks – synth on "I Love Torah"
- Linda Miriam – screaming on "Shabbos"
- Ahron Moeller – art direction
- Erez Safar – cover design
- Breeah Berezin-Bahr – cover photography
