= Elke Reva Sudin =

American artist

- Born: Elke Engelson; 1987 (age 38–39); Springfield, MA
- Education: Pratt Institute (BFA, 2009)
- Known for: Painting, illustration, fashion design
- Spouse: Saul Sudin (m. 2007)
- Website: elkerevasudin.com

Elke Reva Sudin (born 1987) is an American painter, illustrator, fashion designer, and lecturer. In 2010, her Hipsters and Hassids painting series premiered in New York City, comparing and contrasting the Hasidic Jewish and hipster Brooklyn cultures. She founded the live sketching company Drawing Booth in 2014, and is also a founder of Jewish Art Now. In 2023, she launched a collection of luxury scarves with her own custom designs.

== Early life and education ==
Sudin was born in Springfield, Massachusetts, and raised in nearby Longmeadow. She attended Pratt Institute in Brooklyn, New York, earning a BFA in Illustration in 2009.

== Career ==
Broadway the Divide Gauche, ink, digital, 13" x 19", 2009

Yael Oil on wood panel, 24" x 36", 2012

=== Hipsters and Hassids ===
Sudin's 2010 Hipsters and Hassids series depicts the parallel lives of the disparate cultural groups in Williamsburg, Brooklyn, known for feuding over a variety of issues, such as whether or not there should be bicycle lanes down the Satmar stretch of Bedford Avenue. Sudin's colorful paintings examine the similarities and differences of north Williamsburg's hipster residents with south Williamsburg's Satmar Hasidic Jews, such as 2 am, with side-by-side paintings showing a group of partying community members, one of hipsters, one of Hasids. To create the series, Sudin interviewed neighborhood residents in Williamsburg and made a drawing of them in her sketchbook with a felt-tip pen. She would later make acrylic paintings based on the drawings. The series was originally produced as part of her senior BFA thesis at the Pratt Institute. It premiered in 2010 in New York City.

In the 2012 documentary Punk Jews (dir. Jesse Zook Mann), Sudin is profiled and presents paintings from Hipsters and Hassids.

=== Drawing Booth ===
In 2014, Sudin founded Drawing Booth, an event service in which a team of artists circulate among the guests and offer to create quick, realistic hand-drawn digital portraits using an iPad Pro and Apple Pencil. The portraits can be emailed, live-tweeted, projected at the event, or printed on-site and made available on archival-quality paper as 4" by 6" portraits. Past clients include L'Oreal, IBM, Disney, ESPN, Marriott Hotels, Bain Capital, Godiva and InStyle magazine.

=== Scarves ===
In 2023, at an event put on by the Jewish art collective Havurah, Sudin launched The Crown Collection, a series of silk head scarves. It is her first foray into fashion. She views the collection as a statement of pride and a way to bring attention towards the tradition of hair covering as a married Orthodox Jewish woman, and of head covering in a religious context in general. Some of the headscarf designs align with pressure points on the wearer's head, which Sudin learned about while studying reiki in India.

=== Other work ===
Sudin has gained recognition for her 2009 series of portraits of World Boxing Association super welterweight champion boxer Yuri Foreman, which were exhibited as part of the DUMBO Art Under the Bridge Festival in 2009 at Gleason's Gym in Brooklyn.

In 2010, Sudin and her husband Saul Sudin founded the group Jewish Art Now, a website focused on contemporary Jewish art and culture. They also founded SUDIN magazine, which explored similar topics and was later incorporated into Jewish Art Now. She also served as artistic director of PresenTense magazine from 2011 to 2013.

Her 2013 series We Are Patriarchs is a series of portraits reimagining Biblical figures as contemporary Jews living in modern-day Brooklyn. The 12 oil paintings debuted at the Hadas Gallery in Brooklyn in 2013. A painting from the series, Joseph in Exile, was included in the 2016 exhibit Brooklyn: Juxtaposition at Repair the World in Brooklyn. "An exceptionally large and well executed piece" that portrays Joseph and his Egyptian wife Osnat as Jews of color, it was cited as the standout of the exhibit by Tablet magazine.

== Style ==
Sudin draws and paints portraits, urban landscapes and abstract conceptual landscapes, often with Jewish themes. She works on paper with watercolor and ink, on canvas with acrylics or oils, and also creates drawings using the iPad Pro.

== Personal life ==
Sudin lives in Brooklyn, New York, with her husband, filmmaker Saul Sudin.

== Honors and awards ==
- The Jewish Week 36 Under 36, 2011
- PresenTense Fellow, 2013
- Art Sprinter Emerging Jewish Artist Award finalist, 2015
- Forbes Councils member, 2023
