= Punk Jews =

- Punk Jews poster depicting Y-Love
- Directed by: Jesse Zook Mann
- Produced by: Saul Sudin; Evan Kleinman
- Narrated by: Evan Kleinman
- Cinematography: Ed Nescot
- Edited by: Alexander Emanuele
- Music by: Shemspeed; Matt Dallow
- Distributed by: Adon Olam Productions; National Center for Jewish Film
- Release date: December 11, 2012 (United States)
- Running time: 55 min 53 sec
- Country: United States
- Language: English
- Budget: $10,721

Punk Jews is a 2012 American documentary film directed by Jesse Zook Mann and produced by Saul Sudin (husband of Elke Reva Sudin, who appears in the film), Evan Kleinman, and Alexander Emanuele. The film profiles several non-traditional Orthodox Jewish artists, activists, and groups based in New York City.

== Summary ==
The film opens with Yishai Romanoff, lead singer of the Hasidic punk band Moshiach Oi!, standing on a rooftop saying, "Here's how you bring light into the world. You get up in the morning, and you scream, 'GOD!'", which he proceeds to demonstrate.

The film covers several unconventional Jewish artists, activists, and groups. Subjects include:

- Kal Holczler, the founder of Voices for Dignity, addressing child sexual abuse in Hasidic communities, of which he was a victim.
- Cholent, a weekly gathering of Jews from a variety of religious and cultural backgrounds.
- "Amazing Amy" Harlib a.k.a. the Yoga Yenta, an elderly Jewish contortionist and performance artist.
- Rapper Yitz Jordan ("Y-Love") and blogger Shais Rishon ("Ma Nishtana"), addressing the prejudice experienced by African-American Jews in the Orthodox community.
- The Sukkos Mob, a group of Yiddish theatre revivalists and street performers

== Background ==
Mann and Kleinman conceived of Punk Jews after being invited to a Cholent gathering at the Millinery Center Synagogue and subsequently becoming regulars. It was there that they were introduced to Jewish counterculture and met many of the film's subjects, as well as co-producer Saul Sudin.

The film was funded via Kickstarter, earning $10,721 in donations, and was distributed by Adon Olam Productions and the National Center for Jewish Film.

== Release ==
Punk Jews premiered at the Manhattan Jewish Community Center on December 11, 2012. It subsequently premiered in Poland on April 25, 2013, at the Jewish Motifs International Film Festival.

== Reception ==
The film has received mixed reviews, many praising its unique subject matter while critiquing its uneven tone and lack of cohesion. George Robinson of The Jewish Week called the film "competently crafted" and "suggestive in the best sense", but admitted that it "feels rather precipitous and definitely unfinished", as well as "a bit superficial". Ezra Glinter of The Forward called the film's central idea of a unified Jewish counterculture "fanciful at best", saying "While many of these subjects are interesting separately, and a few might be worthy of full-length documentaries of their own, they don’t cohere as a single film."

== See also ==
- Hasidic hipsters
- 93Queen (2018)
