= Moshiach Oi! =

American Hasidic hardcore punk band

- Origin: Long Beach, New York, USA
- Genres: Jewish rock; hardcore punk
- Years active: 2008–present
- Labels: Shemspeed; Shabasa
- Spinoffs: Blanket Statementstein; White Shabbos; Rockazion; Shin Shin Mem
- Members: Yishai Romanoff; Mike Wagner; Mitchell "Mordechai" Harrison; Paul "Pesach" Alpert
- Website: moshiachoi.bandcamp.com

Moshiach Oi! is an American Hasidic hardcore punk band from Long Beach, New York. Formed in 2008 by lead singer Yishai Romanoff and guitarist Mike Wagner, they released their debut album, Better Get Ready (2009), on Shemspeed Records, followed in 2011 by This World is Nothing. They were prominently featured in the 2012 documentary Punk Jews.

== Band history ==
Moshiach Oi! was started in 2008 by singer/guitarist Yishai Romanoff, who had sought to reconcile his then-recently renewed Jewish faith with the punk rock music he had loved as a teenager. Initially a solo act, Romanoff eventually brought in his friend Mike Wagner, as well as bassist Mitchell "Mordechai" Harrison and drummer Paul "Pesach" Alpert, to complete the band. The band's name is derived from a combination of Moshiach, the Jewish name for the Messiah; oy vey, a Yiddish expression conveying exasperation and dismay; and Oi!, a British working-class genre of punk music.

The group's debut album, Better Get Ready, produced by Wagner and mastered by veteran punk producer Don Fury, was released by Shemspeed Records and the band's own Shabasa Records label on August 25, 2009. A second album, This World is Nothing, was released two years later just on Shabasa, accompanied by the single and music video "Got Nothing On Me".

A third album, Rock Rabeinu, was released on August 10, 2017.

== Musical style ==
Moshiach Oi's music combines the sound of traditional hardcore punk with lyrics that promote Jewish ideals and values. While the music is inspired by Romanoff's teenage love of punk bands like Leftöver Crack and F-Minus, lyrical topics include blessing God, Shabbat, Torah study, idolatry, Moshiach, and Rebbe Nachman of Breslov. Patrick Aleph of the website Jewcy summarized Better Get Ready as "a blistering punk rock siddurim that effortlessly ties together Black Flag and Rambam, 7 Seconds and the Rebbe, The Casualties and the Kabballists."

== Shabasa Records ==
Shabasa Records
- Founded: 2004
- Founder: Mike Wagner, Yishai Romanoff, Paul Alpert, Mitchell Harrison
- Status: Active
- Genre: Jewish rock, punk rock, folk, reggae
- Country of origin: U.S.
- Location: Long Beach, New York

All of Moshiach Oi!'s music has been distributed through their self-owned independent label Shabasa Records. The label's roster also includes several other acts, all of whom feature some or all of Moshiach Oi!'s members.

=== Current artists ===
- Moshiach Oi!
- Blanket Statementstein, an acid punk/alternative hip hop band. Their lineup has at various times included all four members of Moshiach Oi!, the Jewish rapper Y-Love, and drummer Dennis Donaghy of Dirt Bike Annie.
- RockaZion, a Jewish reggae band led by Joseph Rotkowitz.
- White Shabbos, a Celtic punk band. The group is led by Alpert's brother, Josh Alpert, who is also signed to the label as a country folk solo artist under the name Mr. Shabbos.
- Shin Shin Mem, a reggae, punk, and alternative rock project by Shlomo Shmuel Moshe Etlinger.
- Na Nach Oi!, Yishai Romanoff's acoustic solo project.

== Members ==
- Yishai Romanoff — lead vocals, guitar
- Mike Wagner — guitar, vocals, trombone
- Mitchell "Mordechai" Harrison — bass guitar, vocals
- Paul "Pesach" Alpert — drums

== Discography ==
=== Albums ===
- Better Get Ready (June 20, 2009; Shemspeed, Shabasa)
- This World Is Nothing (June 28, 2011; Shabasa)
- Rock Rabeinu (August 10, 2017; Shabasa)

=== Singles ===
- "Got Nothing on Me" (This World is Nothing; music video)

== See also ==
- Jews in punk rock
