= Yishai Romanoff =

American Hasidic musician (born 1986)

Yishai Romanoff Yishai Yitzchak
- Also known as: Yishai Na Nach
- Origin: Long Island, New York
- Genres: Jewish rock, punk rock, reggae
- Occupation(s): Singer, songwriter, guitarist, drummer
- Instrument(s): Vocals, guitar, drums, percussion
- Years active: 2007-present
- Labels: Shemspeed, Shabasa
- Member of: Moshiach Oi!, Blanket Statementstein, RockaZion, Shin Shin Mem
- Website: moshiachoi.com

Yishai Romanoff is an American Hasidic musician, best known as the lead singer for the Breslov punk band Moshiach Oi!. Romanoff, as well as the rest of the band, is featured prominently in the 2012 documentary Punk Jews. He is also a drummer for Shabasa labelmates Blanket Statementstein, RockaZion, and Shin Shin Mem.

== Biography ==
=== Early life ===
Romanoff grew up on Long Island. His father was a secular Jew, while his mother was an atheist who converted to Orthodox Judaism. He attended a Modern Orthodox yeshiva at a young age. Frustrated with the yeshiva's rules and strictures, he left and began going to public high school. During his teenage years, Romanoff became a fan of punk rock, following bands like Leftöver Crack and F-Minus and going to shows at CBGB and ABC No Rio. He also dabbled in drugs, smoking marijuana daily and developing a heroin addiction.

Later on, Romanoff took trips to Israel with Birthright Israel and Young Judaea, which left him curious about his heritage. With the help of his friend Mike Wagner, he ultimately kicked his drug addiction, becoming straight edge, and renewed his commitment to Judaism. He is a vegan.

=== Career ===
In 2008, Romanoff, wanting to reconcile his love of punk with his newfound faith, began writing and recording Jewish-themed punk songs under the name Moshiach Oi!. Initially a solo project, Moshiach Oi! became a full band with the addition of Wagner on guitar, Mitchell "Mordechai" Harrison on bass, and Paul "Pesach" Alpert on drums. The group's debut album, Better Get Ready, produced by Wagner and mastered by Don Fury, was released by Shemspeed and Shabasa in 2009. A second album, This World is Nothing, was released independently in 2011.

The band was featured heavily in the 2012 documentary Punk Jews. Romanoff in particular appears in the film's opening scene, where he is shown screaming on a rooftop. He also appears on the cover of former Forward columnist Michael Croland's 2016 book Oy Oy Oy Gevalt!: Jews and Punk.

== Performance style ==
In typical punk fashion, Romanoff's live performances are often wild and exuberant. John Leland of The New York Times described him at a 2013 concert, "side curls flailing, knees jackknifing up around his torso, leaping, crouching, shouting..." Matthue Roth, in a Tablet Magazine piece covering Blanket Statementstein, referred to Romanoff as "the drummer for whom Animal the Muppet is probably not only a musical guide but a fashion icon."

== Discography ==
With Moshiach Oi!

- Better Get Ready (2009; Shemspeed, Shabasa)
- This World is Nothing (2011; Shabasa)

Other work

- Blanket Statementstein, Blanket Statementstein (2008)
- RockaZion, In This Generation (2011)
- Shin Shin Mem, Shirei Moharan Vol. 1 (2014)
