= Danger 5 =

Australian television series

- Logo starting from series 2
- Created by: Dario Russo; David Ashby
- Written by: Dario Russo; David Ashby
- Directed by: Dario Russo
- Starring: David Ashby; Sean James Murphy; Nataša Ristić; Amanda Simons; Aldo Mignone; Pacharo Mzembe
- Country of origin: Australia
- Original languages: English, German, Russian, Italian, French, Japanese, Cantonese
- No. of series: 2
- No. of episodes: 13

Production
- Producers: Kate Croser; Dario Russo
- Cinematography: Sam King
- Running time: 25 minutes (approx.)
- Production companies: Dinosaur; Hedone Productions

Original release
- Network: SBS One (series 1); SBS 2 (series 2)
- Release: 27 February 2012 – 15 February 2015

Related
- Italian Spiderman

Danger 5 is an Australian action surreal comedy television series which premiered on SBS One on 27 February 2012. The men's-adventure-magazine-inspired series was created by Dario Russo and David Ashby, who gained the attention of SBS with their successful web series Italian Spiderman.

The first series is set in a bizarre, campy, 1960s interpretation of World War II and follows a group of five international spies on a mission to kill Adolf Hitler and thwart his plans of world domination. The second series is set in a similarly bizarre interpretation of 1982, with Hitler again the villain after somehow surviving the end of the war. The second series began airing on SBS 2 on 4 January 2015.

== Project history ==
=== Development ===
After the success of the web series Italian Spiderman created by Alrugo Entertainment (Russo, Ashby, Tait Wilson, Will Spartalis and Boris Repasky), Australian broadcaster SBS became interested in turning the project into an interstitial television show. Due to ownership and copyright issues within the production team, the project fell through. Nonetheless, SBS were still interested in Russo and Ashby and in 2009 offered a development deal for a new show. Russo and Ashby submitted three concepts that, regardless of which was chosen, they would be happy to make. Danger 5 was the chosen concept, the most ambitious and dense of the three.

=== Broadcast ===
In the lead up to the Australian broadcast, SBS cut the pilot episode, The Diamond Girls, into a web series of five episodes released weekly throughout November and December 2011. The online web series The Diamond Girls was written after the main season, at the behest of an investor, to "bridge" between Italian Spiderman (a previously released web series by the same creators) and Danger 5. The series itself premiered on SBS One on 27 February 2012.

As a promotional bonus on the show's website, "there [was] a one-off issue of Danger! Monthly, a magazine reminiscent of the ones which prompted the series, and [which is like] something the characters in the show might read."

On 11 September 2014, the crew announced that series 2 had been delayed due to unforeseen international news events and the recent ISIS actions. They released the series two trailer on the same day. The second series began airing on SBS 2 on 4 January 2015.

== Setting and style ==
The first series is nominally set in World War II but uses a style more akin to a TV spy series. The titular Danger 5 are a small group of Allied agents who are tasked with stopping various schemes overseen by Adolf Hitler. Each episode sees an intentionally ahistorical version of a major Axis person come up with a bizarre plan more in line with a TV or comic book villain of the 1950s or 60s—stealing monuments from Allied nations to build an absurd Nazi super-monument, resurrecting dinosaurs, running a fixed casino to make weapons from gold and reprogramming captured airmen as Japanese pilots.

The series adds a further layer of satire by intentionally aping the production and dated values. Obvious studio sets are used for outdoor shots, model work is intentionally poor, usually featuring unrealistic movements and visible strings, the characters often laugh at bad puns immediately following the deaths of allies. All drink and smoke conspicuously while non-white characters are often played by white actors with poor make-up. Stock footage is also used, most notably a shot of Hitler jumping through a glass window to escape that is reused in settings that feature no such window.

Further surreal humour comes from the characters treating their universe seriously and not questioning various situations that are inexplicable to the viewer.

== Cast and characters ==
Main characters of Danger 5
Actor	Character	Series	
Actor	Character	1	2
David Ashby	Jackson	Main	Main
Nataša Ristić	Ilsa	Main	Main
Sean James Murphy	Tucker	Main	Main
Amanda Simons (voice: Michelle Nightingale)	Claire	Main	Main
Tilman Vogler	Colonel Chestbridge	Main	3 episodes
Aldo Mignone	Pierre	Main	1 episode
Pacharo Mzembe	Pierre		Main
Elizabeth Hay	Holly		Main
Fumito Arai	McKenzie		Main

Historical characters of Danger 5
Actor	Character	Series	
Actor	Character	1	2
Carmine Russo (voice: Andreas Sobik)	Adolf Hitler	Main	Main
Robert Tompkins	Josef Mengele	1 episode	1 episode
Brendan Rock	Erwin Rommel/Desert Fox	1 episode	1 episode
Paul Muscat	Emperor Hirohito	1 episode	
Greg Marsh	Joseph Stalin	1 episode	
Marlon Shepherdson	Benito Mussolini	1 episode	
Craig Behenna	Joseph Goebbels	1 episode	
Eddie Morrison	Hermann Göring	1 episode	
Tim Overton	Reinhard Heydrich	1 episode	
Ben Finn	Heinrich Himmler	1 episode	
Steve Parker	Nikita Khrushchev		5 episodes
Nathan Cain	Otto Skorzeny/Carlos Mendez		2 episodes
Vince Poletto	Juan Perón		1 episode
Daniel Becker	Martin Bormann		1 episode
Kade Marsh	Adolf Eichmann		1 episode
Mike Gray	Franz Stangl/White Death		1 episode
Aaron Melville-Smith	Klaus Barbie/Klaus		1 episode
Anthony Rinna	Gustav Wagner/Beast		1 episode
Andrew Wallis	Alfred Rosenberg/Red Mountain		1 episode
Shaun Micallef	Ernst Kaltenbrunner		1 episode

== Characters ==
=== Danger 5 ===
A team of five Allied operatives repeatedly given bizarre missions by Colonel Chestbridge, not to mention responsibility for killing Hitler. All are highly trained, happy to kill without feeling any remorse, drink alcohol casually before, during, and after what are pitched as serious military operations, and chain-smoke.

==== Jackson ====
Jackson (David Ashby) is a macho and fiercely patriotic American, once abandoning the team in a futile attempt to prevent Hitler stealing the Statue of Liberty. He clashes frequently with Tucker on missions due to having a hedonistic and selfish approach to work. Jackson harbours an unrequited crush on Ilsa and reads Real Man Magazine.

==== Ilsa ====
Ilsa (Nataša Ristić) is a Russian, and speaks all of her dialogue in Russian with subtitles, which everyone understands without comment. She wears her uniform with as much flesh showing as possible and sees little problem with using sex to help the team in their missions (once distracting Joseph Goebbels by performing oral sex on him) or even if she just feels like it. This may be due to the staid lack of emotions Russians in the series have. She feels Claire is a prude and is aware of Jackson's feelings for her but seems indifferent. Ilsa is also a former wife of Erwin Rommel.

==== Tucker ====
Tucker is an uptight Australian member of the team. He is straight-laced to the point that hearing bossa nova causes him to suffer nosebleeds while he is often irked by the rest of the team being so easily distracted, though he is frequently undermined when they prove successful. He is a fan of Sensible Chuckle magazine and is in love with Claire, who saves him from becoming an indestructible Japanese robot-man. He later woos her with a self-written piece for the recorder and they finally kiss when the team seemingly kill Hitler in a tokusatsu mech battle, ending World War II. Despite being portrayed in-universe as a square he still partakes in the same level of drinking and smoking as everyone else.

At the start of the second series they are preparing to get married when Claire is murdered by a returning Hitler. A grief-stricken Tucker attempts to turn himself into a brooding revenge-driven ninja in response but turns out to be inept. Throughout the series, he suffers flashbacks of Claire's beheading and carries her head around with him.

==== Claire ====
Claire is a Cambridge graduate and a prim, chaste English woman. She is frequently uncomfortable around Ilsa and Jackson's openly sexual behaviour and initially frosty towards Tucker's more reserved approaches, though in the latter case she eventually relents. Claire is easily the most intelligent and capable member of the team. In an intentional comment on the sexism of the shows Danger 5 is spoofing, she is largely ignored; Colonel Chestbridge especially takes great pleasure in belittling the usually salient points she raises during briefings.

She is set to marry Tucker at the start of the second series but is killed on the day of her wedding.

==== Pierre ====
Pierre is of hazy European origin and obsessed with making the team cocktails. There are a series of recurring jokes around the character—wherever the team are sent he seemingly unexpectedly runs into an old acquaintance who knows him by a different name and hints at a mysterious past for Pierre; said acquaintance then dies in his arms partway through the episode, imparting a "perfect" cocktail recipe with their dying words.

Pierre is depicted as the most easygoing and diplomatic member of the group, often acting as a mediator between the aggressive Jackson and Ilsa and the more restrained Tucker and Calire. He is notably the only team member who expresses distress over collateral casualties during missions, while his comrades remain indifferent.

In series 2, Pierre is played by Pacharo Mzembe. The change is never mentioned in the series, even when he goes back in time and interacts with his past self (played by the original actor). Between series 1 and 2, Pierre has become an internationally famous musician. He is widely recognised by the general public and beats Johnny Hitler for the title of Christmas King due to his fame. In the episode "Un Sacco Di Natale", Pierre tells the Nazis disguised as priests that he is Catholic.

==== Kilroy ====
A sixth member of the team inexplicably introduced partway through the series 1 finale, Kilroy is a cel-animated anthropomorphic dog. His cartoon nature is never mentioned by anyone, nor is his sudden appearance. He largely speaks in hackneyed surfer vernacular until he is fatally shot in the head by Hitler midway through the episode. After imparting a dying cocktail recipe to Pierre he is never seen, mentioned or referenced ever again.

==== Colonel Chestbridge ====
The team's superior who gives them their missions, which always finish with a reminder to "kill Hitler". He has a bird's head which, in keeping with the show's style of humour, is neither explained nor mentioned by any of the characters. The Colonel displays open irritation and contempt for Claire and grows more irascible as the first series goes on due to the team's failures to kill Hitler and end the war, escalating to using a shotgun to keep order during a briefing.

He is seemingly retired at the start of the second series but is targeted and killed by Hitler.

== Episodes ==
=== Series 1 (2012) ===
This list is ordered by the original air dates on SBS One in Australia.

No. overall	No. in series	Title	Original release date
0	0	"The Diamond Girls" (prequel episode aired on YouTube)	20 November 2011
Deep in Nazi Germany, Jackson, Pierre and Tucker have been working undercover in Adolf Hitler's favourite bar, the Black Dog, waiting for the perfect chance to knock off the big man, and end the Second World War. Things get complicated when Hitler turns up with a posse of bullet-proof She-Nazis who prove too formidable for even these three seasoned spies. After bungling the assassination attempt, Allied Command give the boys a little extra motivation in the form of two beautiful newcomers, Ilsa and Claire. Jackson, Pierre and Tucker will have to join forces with their reluctant new comrades to form Danger 5 so that they can succeed in their ultimate goal; to kill Adolf Hitler. On their first mission together, Danger 5 discover that Hermann Göring and the Nazis have been stealing the world's supply of a rare black diamond known as Carbonado, thought to be behind the She-Nazis.
1	1	"I Danced For Hitler"	27 February 2012
A team of Nazi zeppelins abduct the Eiffel Tower and Danger 5 heads straight to Paris to investigate. The team find help from an all-girl team of resistance vixens, but their plans are swiftly hampered by a Nazi task force raid. Ilsa and Claire are taken to a torture dungeon where Josef Goebbels recruits them as part of his dance troupe for Hitler's birthday spectacular. Tucker and Pierre follow the girls to Hitler's private retreat, the Eagle's Nest, and try to mount a rescue mission. Meanwhile Jackson tries to stop the Nazis from stealing the Statue of Liberty.
2	2	"Lizard Soldiers of the Third Reich"	5 March 2012
American GIs are being decimated by Nazi dinosaurs all over the Western front. Danger 5 heads to Belgium to investigate and has a series of close shaves with a trigger-happy Triceratops and a perverted Nazi Pterodactyl. Claire discovers that the dinosaurs have all been implanted with a mysterious type of crystal, native to Antarctica and Danger 5 embark on a journey to the South Pole. Antarctica proves to be a lost plateau of prehistoric wonder where Danger 5 encounter the bizarre Dr Josef Mengele and his sinister volcano base filled with Nazi dinosaur minions.
3	3	"Kill-Men of the Rising Sun"	12 March 2012
Allied Air Support surrounding China is being thrashed by Japanese Zero fighters piloted by robot super soldiers and, to make matters worse, Japan itself has completely vanished from the map. Danger 5 sets off in their Danger Fighters to give the Japanese some healthy competition. The Japanese robo-pilots prove to be too formidable even for the Danger 5 team, who are shot out of the sky. After bailing from their damaged aircraft, Ilsa and Tucker find themselves in a mysterious spa-resort while Claire, Jackson and Pierre land amongst the insalubrious surrounds of General Chang's Burmese Opium Pagoda. Danger 5 must reunite and locate Japan and put a stop to the every growing army of Japanese, Nazi robot soldiers.
4	4	"Hitler's Golden Murder Palace"	19 March 2012
An Allied Agent has uncovered strange happenings at a Nazi-owned casino in North Africa where Hitler is rumoured to be located. After the agent goes missing under mysterious circumstances, Danger 5 is sent into Waheed Al-Quarn to smoke Hitler out of his African cash-hole. Things get complicated when Tucker is captured by Italian Submariners and Ilsa bumps into her ex-husband, Erwin Rommel, The Desert Fox.
5	5	"Fresh Meat For Hitler's Sex Kitchen"	26 March 2012
Allied troops throughout Europe are spontaneously turning Nazi. Danger 5 are sent to connect with Field Marshal Jenkins as he travels out of Switzerland by train after a weekend of R and R at Switzerland's top brothel 'The Palomino'. Jenkins' entire platoon has recently turned Nazi and Allied Command want him home safe before Jenkins can be turned too. Things turn pear-shaped on the train when Jenkins starts babbling Kraut-speak and has to be put out of his misery. Ilsa and Jackson knock off Reinhard Heydrich, a would-be Nazi jewel thief, in the drinks cart and accept a belt of whisky from a British spy who is not who he claims to be, buying them a one-way ticket to Hitler's dungeon of occult perversions.
6	6	"Final Victory"	2 April 2012
The world is under attack from invincible, giant Nazi monsters and Allied Command is ready to surrender, when out of the blue they receive a strange telegram from a man called Gibraltar, who claims to be from the lost city of Atlantis. Gibraltar claims that the Atlanteans have developed a weapon powerful enough to destroy the Nazi monsters and all they require is some refined uranium to complete the device. On their way to deliver the uranium to Atlantis in the Danger Submarine, Danger 5 comes under attack from perils of the deep, resulting in Jackson and Claire being separated from the team, feared dead. Ilsa, Pierre and Tucker reach the strange sanctuary of Atlantis and deliver the uranium, however, Gibraltar is not as friendly as he appears to be.

=== Series 2 (2015) ===
Series 2 began airing on 4 January 2015.

No. overall	No. in series	Title	Original release date	Australian viewers (thousands)
7	1	"Merry Christmas Colonel"	4 January 2015	48,000
After Colonel Chestbridge is killed in an apparent assassination by Hitler and a wolf-headed man, Allied super-team Danger 5 reunite after years of far-flung obscurity to stop Hitler's ultimate quest for world domination and to save Christmas in a 1980s excess-soaked universe of neon, ninjas, discos, dinosaurs, pizza and prom-queens.
8	2	"Johnny Hitler"	11 January 2015	27,000
Hitler has infiltrated a high school in the American mid-west in search of a female senior student. His motives are unknown. Danger 5 are forced to go undercover and back to school, where Tucker's teaching skills are pushed to the limit, Pierre's coolness is put to the test and Jackson is hunted by a ruby-eyed wolf man with a machine gun and a grudge.
9	3	"Revenge of the Lizardmen"	18 January 2015	N/A
Danger 5 are fugitives in Metro City, wrongfully accused of kidnapping high school senior Holly De Palma. Hitler has infiltrated the police and leads the hunt for Danger 5 but little does he know that his own people are working against him: Joseph Mengele and his sinister accomplice Mr. Pedro are plotting a scheme, which involves the return of some scaly, prehistoric bad guys.
10	4	"Un Sacco Di Natale (A Sack of Christmas)"	25 January 2015	N/A
Hitler has been taken captive by a cabal at the Vatican. McKenzie attempts to discover the secrets behind Hitler's plan regarding Holly, as Tucker attempts to deal with his trauma related to Claire. Ilsa and Jackson deal with relationship woes. Pierre finds Jesus as Hitler finds a new source of power.
11	5	"Super Dead"	1 February 2015	N/A
Danger 5 goes to USSR Land to reclaim Holly from her kidnapper Khrushchev, while Ilsa and Jackson both vie for revenge. Things don't go exactly as planned as Hitler's zombie army comes into the mix and Danger 5 are forced to deal with the consequences of the space-time continuum.
12	6	"Back to the Führer"	8 February 2015	N/A
Danger 5 go back to World War II in an attempt to stop Hitler from changing the fabric of time. Ignoring the perils of messing with the space-time continuum, Tucker is dead set on changing the course of history for his own selfish motives while Pierre suffers the consequences. Jackson and Ilsa have a run-in with their past selves and share advice on the future. Meanwhile Hitler is holding Colonel Chestbridge hostage in his mountain lair.
13	7	"Welcome to Hitlerland"	15 February 2015	N/A
In the final installment of Danger 5, the team find themselves in an alternative future where Hitler is undisputed ruler of the universe. In Hitlerland everyone speaks German, everyone loves dogs and worst of all, everything is vegetarian! Danger 5 embark on a quest across space dodging Hitler's deception at every turn. They encounter old friends, new foes and a talking pelican on this epic quest to save the universe.

== Legacy ==
Danger 5 was released on Netflix in the United States, Australia, New Zealand, and United Kingdom, but was removed in March 2017 globally.

A brand-new series of audio stories featuring the original cast was released in 2020 via Audible.
