= Pacharo Mzembe =

Australian actor

- Born: Zimbabwe
- Education: National Institute of Dramatic Art (NIDA)
- Occupation: Actor
- Years active: 2009–present
- Awards: Green Room Award winner, Theatre Companies Performer, 2019 Helpmann Awards, Best Actor in a leading role, South Australian Screen Awards (SASA) - Best Performance nominee for Kind of Man, 2009

Pacharo Mzembe is an Australian actor. He has performed on stage, in several television series and in feature films.

== Early life ==
Mzembe's parents originate from Malawi, but he was born in Zimbabwe. He migrated to Australia at the age of six to the state of Queensland.

== Acting career ==
Mzembe is an alumnus of the National Institute of Dramatic Art (NIDA), after being accepted when he was 17 years old. In the summer of 2012, he undertook a run across Australia, which he founded and named the Run of Awareness, with the aim of highlighting the inequality of educational opportunities for disadvantaged youth in Australia and around the world.

Mzembe started his career in theatre, but has since appeared in numerous television and movie roles, including Monster Problems, Channel Nine’s Here Come the Habibs, Harrow on the ABC, and SBS's Safe Harbour. On the stage, he played Martin Luther King Jr. in The Mountaintop, as well as appearing in Prize Fighter, for which he won a Green Room Award and was nominated for the Sydney Theatre and Helpmann Awards for his portrayal of an ex-child soldier turned boxing contender.

Mzembe is also passionate about youth empowerment and filmmaking.

== Filmography ==
=== Film ===
Year	Title	Role	Notes
2010	Summer Coda	Monty	
2020	Love and Monsters	Ray	
2022	Black Site	Ben Jordan	
2024	Sleeping Dogs	Isaac Samuel	
2026	The Bluff	Chien	

=== Television ===
Year	Title	Role	Notes	Ref
2009	The Diplomat	D.C Terry Ayyar	Television film	
2011	Underbelly	Nuggett	12 episodes	
2011	Terra Nova	Alverez	2 episodes	
2011	Spirited	Ghost Tang	Episode: "Changes"	
2011	Sinbad and the Minotaur	Karim	Television film	
2015	Texas Rising: The Lost Soldier	Joe	Episode #1.2	
2015	Danger 5	Pierre	7 episodes	
2017	Here Come the Habibs	Kanye	3 episodes	
2017	The Family Law	Aaron	Episode: "Matters of the Heart"	
2018	Safe Harbour	Matou	4 episodes	
2019	Harrow	Jacob Diallo	Episode: "Abo Imo Pectore"	
2020	The End	Detective Sharma	Episode: "With Sparkles"	
2021	La Brea	Tony Greene	10 episodes	
2021	Wakefield	Rohan Achebe	5 episodes	
2021	Young Rock	Fireman	Episode: "Working the Gimmick"	
2022	God's Favorite Idiot	Dr. Stephens	Episode: "Tom the Baptist"	
2024	Nautilus	Boniface	10 episodes	

=== Theatre ===
Year	Title	Role	Venue / Co.
	Class Enemy		NIDA
	Sweet Charity		NIDA
2007	Can't Pay? Won't Pay!	Giovanni	NIDA Parade Theatre, Sydney
	Once on This Island		NIDA
	Romeo & Juliet		NIDA
	The Cherry Orchard		NIDA
	The Ramayana		NIDA
	Steppingstone Company		NIDA
2008	Antigone	Pach	Belvoir Street Theatre, Sydney
2008	An Oak Tree		Belvoir Street Theatre, Sydney
2009	Rockabye	Tobias	Southbank Theatre, Melbourne with MTC
2010	Gwen in Purgatory	Father Ezekiel	Belvoir Street Theatre, Sydney, Roundhouse Theatre, Brisbane with La Boite
2013	Solomon and Marion	Solomon	Fairfax Studio, Melbourne with MTC
2014	The Mountaintop	Dr Martin Luther King Jr	Playhouse, Brisbane with Queensland Theatre
2015	A Midsummer Night's Dream	Demetrius / Flute	Roundhouse Theatre, Brisbane with La Boite
2015; 2018	Prize Fighter	Isa	Roundhouse Theatre, Brisbane, Belvoir Street Theatre, Sydney, Logan Entertainment Centre, Northcote Town Hall, Melbourne, IMB Theatre, Wollongong with La Boite
2016	The Tragedy of King Richard III		Roundhouse Theatre, Brisbane with La Boite
2019	L'Appartement	Serge	Cremorne Theatre, Brisbane with Queensland Theatre
2023	Bloom Girl	Director / Producer	Thomas Dixon Centre, Roundhouse Theatre, Brisbane with PM Collab Operations

== Awards ==
Year	Work	Award	Category	Result
2009	Kind of Man	South Australian Screen Awards (SASA)	Best Performance	Nominated
2009	Kind of Man	St Kilda Film Festival	Best Actor	Nominated
2016	Prize Fighter	Helpmann Awards	Best Actor in a Leading Role	Nominated
2019	Pacharo Mzembe	Green Room Award	Theatre Companies Best Performer Award	Won
