= Mike Wagner (musician) =

- Also known as: Menashe Yaakov, Don Bonus
- Born: Michael Wagner
- Origin: Long Beach, New York
- Genres: Afrobeat, reggae, punk rock
- Occupations: Guitarist, trombonist, producer
- Instruments: Guitar, trombone
- Years active: 1995–present
- Labels: Ninja Tune; Luaka Bop; Shemspeed; Shabasa; Daptone
- Member of: Moshiach Oi!, Blanket Statementstein
- Formerly of: The Daktaris, King Changó, Antibalas, White Shabbos

Michael Wagner, sometimes credited as Menashe Yaakov and Don Bonus, is an American musician and producer based in Long Beach, New York. He played on many early Daptone Records releases and, with bands The Daktaris and Antibalas, helped inspire new interest in Nigerian funk and afrobeat music in America during the late nineties. After becoming a Hasidic Jew in 2004, he returned to New York and formed several bands with musicians in the local Jewish community, most notably the hardcore punk band Moshiach Oi!.

== Biography ==
Mike Wagner was born in Long Beach, New York. He was raised in a Modern Orthodox home, but became disillusioned with his faith as a teenager and turned to music.

=== Daptones Records ===
In the late 1990s, Wagner and fellow NYU students Gabriel Roth and Tunde Adebimpe teamed up with record collector Phillip Lehman to record several albums for the funk label Desco Records (later Daptone Records), using a number of aliases and misleading liner notes to attract purist fans of the genre. The most successful of these, The Daktaris' Soul Explosion, was a significant release in Daptone's history and helped renew American interest in the Afrobeat genre.

=== King Changó and Antibalas ===
In 1996, Wagner became the trombonist and guitarist for the Latin/ska band King Changó, who released their self-titled debut album for Luaka Bop and Warner Bros. Records that same year. The group released a second album, The Return of El Santo, in 1998, before several members, including Wagner, joined with Daktaris saxophonist Martín Perna to form the influential Afrobeat group Antibalas.

=== Return to Judaism, Mr. Shabbos, and Moshiach Oi! ===
Amidst touring with Antibalas, Wagner found himself spiritually unsatisfied. Around this time, a friend introduced him to the teachings of Rebbe Shlomo Carlebach. Wagner decided to quit music for a year and started attending Shacharit prayers at his family's synagogue on Long Island and engaging in Torah study, finding that it "made total sense. The void that I felt totally disappeared."

During this time, Wagner converted his home into "Camp Shabbos" and started holding weekly gatherings and Torah study sessions on Friday nights. One of his guests, a singer named Josh "Mr. Shabbos" Alpert, persuaded him to return to music and join Alpert's Celtic punk band White Shabbos. Wagner also contributed to Alpert's later solo album, The Mr. Shabbos Show (2008).

Another guest, Yishai Romanoff, approached Wagner to join his then-solo project Moshiach Oi!. Wagner accepted, having "always wanted to be in a Jewish punk band." After rounding out the band with bassist Mitchell Harrison and drummer Paul Alpert, the group released two albums, Better Get Ready (2009) and This World is Nothing (2011).

== Discography ==
=== With King Changó ===
- King Changó (1996, Luaka Bop)
- The Return of El Santo (2000, Luaka Bop)

=== With Antibalas ===
- Liberation Afro Beat, Vol. 1 (2001, Ninja Tune)
- Talkatif (2002, Ninja Tune)

=== With White Shabbos ===
- Shabbos Holy Shabbos (2004)
- Redemption Songs (TBA)

=== With Mr. Shabbos ===
- The Mr. Shabbos Show (2008)

=== With Moshiach Oi! ===
- Better Get Ready (2009; Shemspeed, Shabasa)
- This World is Nothing (2011, Shabasa)
- Rock Rabeinu (2017, Shabasa)

=== Other work ===
- The Daktaris, Soul Explosion (1998); Assistant engineer, producer
- Ticklah, Polydemic (1998); Trombone
- Jerome Sydenham, Saturday (2001); Trombone
- The Whitefield Brothers, In the Raw (2001); Trombone
- Ticklah, Hi-Fidelity Dub Sessions Presents Roots Combination (2001); Guitar, trombone
- Lee Fields, Problems (2002); Guitar, trombone
- Easy Star All-Stars, Dub Side of the Moon (2003); Trombone
- Anthony B, Untouchable (2004); Guitar
