= Third Coast Kings =

- Origin: Ann Arbor, Michigan, U.S.
- Genres: Deep funk, soul
- Years active: 2007-2017
- Label: Record Kicks
- Past members: Steve Barker (bass), Alec Cooper (saxes), Ryan Dolan (trumpet), Andy Filisko (guitar), Sean Ike (vocals), James Keovongsak (drums), Nate Ayers (bass), Brian Einstein Lassiter (saxophone), Michelle Camilleri (vocals), Terry Kimura (trombone)
- Website: http://www.thirdcoastkings.com

Third Coast Kings was an American funk / soul band based in Ann Arbor, Michigan, United States. The Kings were formed in 2007 by drummer James Keovongsak and bassist Nate Ayers. Their record label Record Kicks describes them as "an eight element proper deep funk and soul outfit from Detroit/Ann Arbor, Michigan, that is influenced by the great James Brown, as well as the many artists from the 60s and 70s whose music was carefully salvaged by the crate digging revolution.". The Kings disbanded just short of their 10 year anniversary.

== Band members ==
In the Summer of 2007, drummer James Keovongsak and bassist Nate Ayers found each other via Craigslist for the project that would become the Third Coast Kings. Originally known as "The Monarchs", Ayers coined the name "Third Coast Kings" as a nod to Michigan's musical legacy (Michigan's Great Lakes are known as the "Third Coast"). After assembling guitarist Andy Filisko, saxophonist Brian Einstein Lassiter, and trumpeter Ryan Dolan, the band performed its first show as TCK on Halloween of 2007 at the Corner Brewery in Ypsilanti, Michigan.

2008 saw the addition of Alec Cooper on the tenor sax, with a brief stint by Heather Schwartz on vocals. In 2009, vocalist Michelle Camilleri joined the band and was featured on their Record Kicks release of "Give Me Your Love/Tonic Stride" on 45 and digital.

In 2011, Ayers left the band to pursue permaculture, Camilleri took a hiatus and the Kings added Terry Kimura on trombone, Sean Ike on vocals and original Monarch's member Steve Barker on bass.

== Notable Performances ==
The Kings' most high-profile performance was at Fuji Rock Festival '12, where they performed Friday afternoon on the White Stage. The trip was also notable for the fact that it was not only bandleader Keovongsak's first time out of the country, but also his first time on a plane.

TCK was also a frequent performer at local and regional events and venues such as the Ann Arbor Summer Festival, Toronto Jazz Festival, Taste of Ann Arbor, Sweet Earth Arts & Music Festival, Brighton Smokin’ Jazz & Barbecue Blues Festival, Kitchener Blues Festival, Cliff Bell's, and others.

== Reception ==
The Kings' release of "Give Me Your Love/Tonic Stride" in 2009 garnered attention in the worldwide funk scene. The tracks were played by prominent DJs such as Lance Ferguson and Adrian Gibson, in addition to being featured on Craig Charles' Funk&Soul Show on BBC 6.

Since the release of their video single "Spicy Brown" and full length self-titled album in March 2012, the Kings have received considerable attention from the blogosphere. THIS IS BOOK'S MUSIC called their music, "[a] funky sound that will bring to mind the heat of James Brown‘s deep grooves", while SoulTracks.com said "Detroit's Third Coast Kings are a 21st Century answer to 20th Century funk." The band has received enthusiastic reviews in the United States, Japan, France, and the U.K.

== Discography ==
- 'Mo' Record Kicks' (Record Kicks, 2010)
- "Give Me Your Love/Tonic Stride" (Record Kicks, 2010)
- 'SoulShaker vol.7' (Record Kicks, 2010)
- 'Mo' Record Kicks Act II' (Record Kicks, 2011)
- 'Third Coast Kings' (Record Kicks, 2012)
- 'West Grand Boulevard' (Record Kicks, 2014)
