= Tanika Charles =

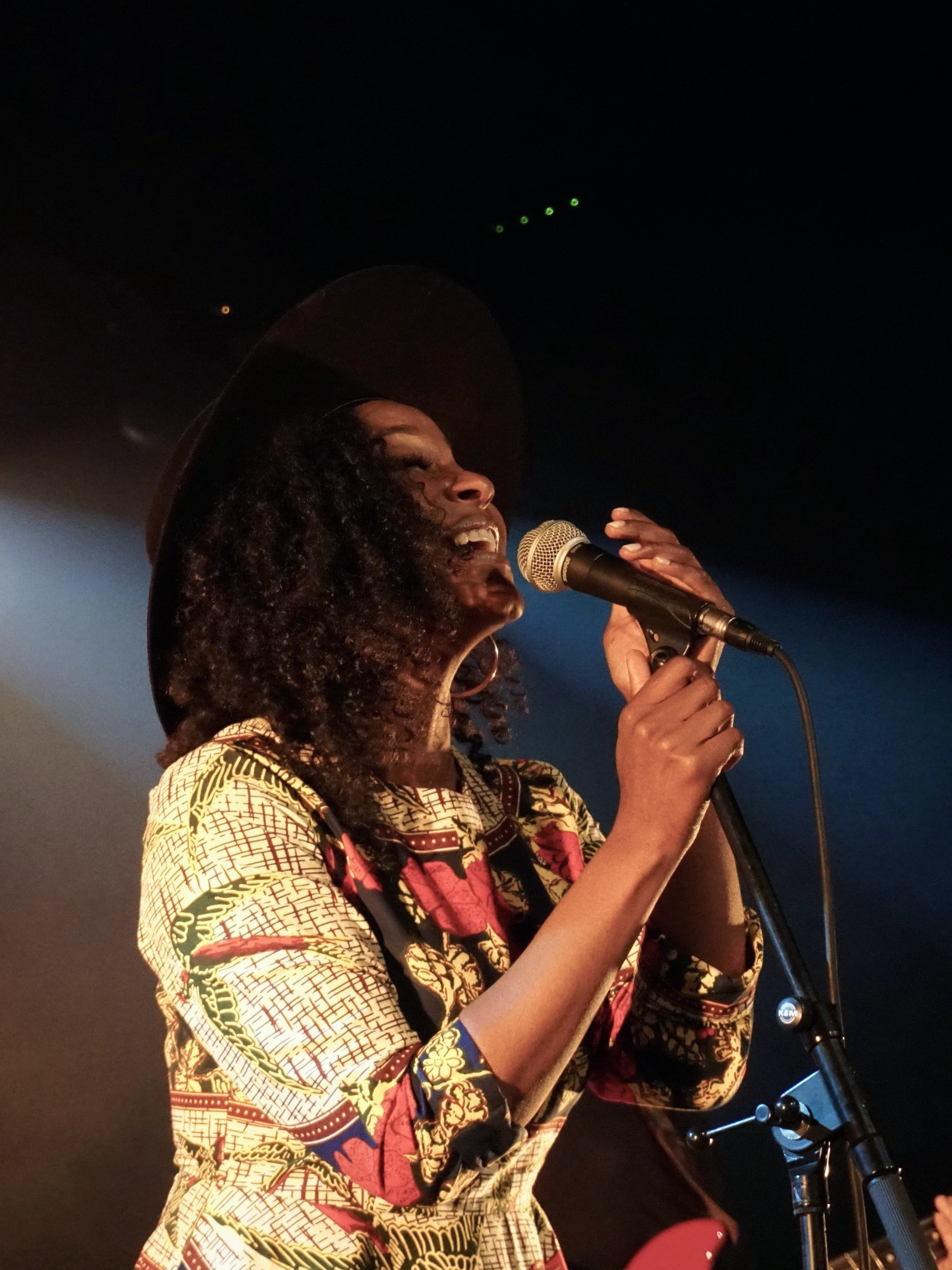
- Charles performing in 2018

Background information
- Genres: Soul, R&B
- Occupation: Singer-songwriter
- Instrument: Vocals
- Years active: 2008–present
- Website: tanikacharles.com

Tanika Charles is a Canadian soul and R&B singer, who released her full-length debut album Soul Run in 2016.

== Life and career ==
Born in Toronto, Ontario and raised in Edmonton, Alberta. Charles is a first generation Trinidadian Canadian.

She moved to Toronto, Ontario in the early 2000s after an opportunity to sing backing vocals for Bedouin Soundclash was offered. Since then, Tanika has performed as a backing vocalist for Johnny Reid, Serena Ryder, Emmanuel Jal, and many others. Tanika performed as a solo artist under the stage name Ms. Chawlz, before releasing her debut EP What! What? What!? in 2010.

She released "Soul Run", the title track from her full-length album, as a preview single in Fall 2015, and followed up with "Two Steps" in April 2016. Both singles were playlisted on CBC Radio 2, and charted on the Radio 2 Top 20. The full album was released on May 10, and was supported by her first extensive toured concert and an advance appearance on CBC Radio One's Q. In June, the album was named to the longlist for the 2016 Polaris Music Prize, and in 2017 it was shortlisted for the Juno Award for R&B/Soul Recording of the Year at the Juno Awards of 2017.

Charles has also appeared on television, both as a reoccurring guest on CBC Kids, and as a lounge singer on the Global drama series Bomb Girls. Her music has been featured on HBO Canada's Less Than Kind, CBC's Workin' Moms, Global's Rookie Blue, Citytv's Seed, and CTV's Saving Hope.

In 2019, Charles released her second album, The Gumption, on Record Kicks.

== Discography ==
=== Albums ===
Title	Details
Soul Run	Released: May 10, 2016 (Canada); Released: April 7, 2017 (International); Label: Tanika Charles Music, Record Kicks; Formats: CD, LP, digital download, streaming
The Gumption	Released: May 10, 2019; Label: Unique Applause, Record Kicks; Formats: CD, LP, digital download, streaming

=== EPs ===
Title	Details
What?What!What?!	Released: May 8, 2010; Label: Self-released; Formats: Formats: CD, digital download, streaming

=== Singles ===
Title	Year	Album
“Silly Happy Wild”	2010	What?What!What?!
“I Am Your Woman”	2012	What?What!What?!
“Soul Run”	2015	Soul Run
“Two Steps”	2016	Soul Run
“Endless Chain”	2017	Soul Run
“Love Fool”	2017	Soul Run
“Love Overdue”	2019	The Gumption
“Tell Me Something”	2019	The Gumption
“Look At Us Now”	2019	The Gumption

=== Music videos ===
Video	Year	Director
I Am Your Woman	2012	Mark Valino
Soul Run	2017	Taha Muharuma & Shanik Tanna
Endless Chain	2017	Taha Muharuma & Shanik Tanna
Two Steps	2018	Michael Warren
Cadillac Moon	2019	Aline Helmcke
Love Overdue	2019	V.T. Nayani
Tell Me Something	2019	V.T. Nayani
Look At Us Now	2019	V.T. Nayani

== Awards and nominations ==
Year	Award	Category	Nominee/Work	Result	Ref
2016	Polaris Music Prize		Soul Run	Longlist	
2017	Juno Awards of 2017	R&B/Soul Recording of the Year	Soul Run	Nominated	
2019	Polaris Music Prize		The Gumption	Longlist	
