= Mimu Maxi =

American women's fashion company

- Industry: Women's clothing
- Founded: 2014
- Founders: Mushky Notik and Mimi Hecht
- Headquarters: New York City, USA
- Website: mimumaxi.com

Mimu Maxi (styled MIMU MAXI) is a women's fashion company based in New York City. The company was founded in 2014 by Chabad Hasidic women Mushky Notik and Mimi Hecht.

The brand gained attention for their attempt at mediating between contemporary fashion trends and the moral codes of Orthodox Judaism which legislates various modesty requirements for Jewish women. In 2014, the brand founders collaborated with a Muslim fashion blogger causing some debate in the Orthodox community.

== See also ==
- Modest fashion
- Hipster Hasidim
