= The Return of El Santo =

Studio album by King Changó
- Released: October 24, 2000
- Genre: Ska punk, Latin
- Length: 55:00
- Label: Luaka Bop

King Changó chronology
King Changó (1996)	The Return of El Santo (2000)

Professional ratings
Review scores
Source	Rating
AllMusic	3/5 stars
Robert Christgau	(dud)
Los Angeles Times	2/4 stars

The Return of El Santo is the second album by the Latin ska band King Changó, released in 2000. The album's title is a tribute to Mexican wrestler El Santo.

== Production ==
The album was recorded in various cities with producers KC Porter, Macaco, and Richard Blair.

== Critical reception ==
The Washington Post wrote that "it's a breathtakingly ambitious recording, and it works because the band doesn't jump from style to style but fuses them into a fresh, coherent sound." CMJ New Music Monthly called the album "ravenous, rowdy pop giddily blurring the lines between genres." Billboard deemed it "100% Nuyorican worldbeat." The Chicago Tribune wrote that "the song cycle ends in a happy revolution, way over the top, romantic and cynical all at once." The Arizona Republic wrote: "Each cut is an addictive, sarcastic fiesta in itself. Mucho percussion. Mucho horns. Mucho cajones."

== Track listing ==
1. "Finalmente" (Andrew Blanco, Luis Blanco, Glenda Lee) – 4:33
2. "El Santo" (A. Blanco, L. Blanco, Luis Ruíz, Mike Wagner) – 4:01
3. "Brujería" (A. Blanco, L. Blanco) – 5:11
4. "Tú Verás" (Ramón Nova) – 6:28
5. "What Politicians Say" (Francisco Gallardo, Lee, Nova, M. Viera, A. Vlanco) – 3:15
6. "I Don't Care" (A. Blanco, L. Blanco) – 4:03
7. "Sin Ti" (A. Blanco, L. Blanco) – 4:47
8. "Best Dressed Pimp" (A. Blanco, Lee, Ruíz) – 4:01
9. "Lil' Sister" (A. Blanco, L. Blanco, Lee, Candice Owens) – 5:13
10. "Full Time Business" (A. Blanco, J.B. Eck, Gallardo, Lee) – 2:51
11. "Step Me Down" (A. Blanco, Gallardo, Lee, Nova, Viera) – 4:20
12. "Champion Sound" (A. Blanco, Nova) – 6:17
