= Jesse Zook Mann =

American documentary filmmaker

Jesse Zook Mann is an American documentary producer and director best known for Punk Jews and My First Time. His work has appeared on NBC, VICE, MTV, Al Jazeera, and The Science Channel. Mann concentrates on subjects revolving around subcultures, outsiders, and activism. Mann currently lives in Seattle, Washington.

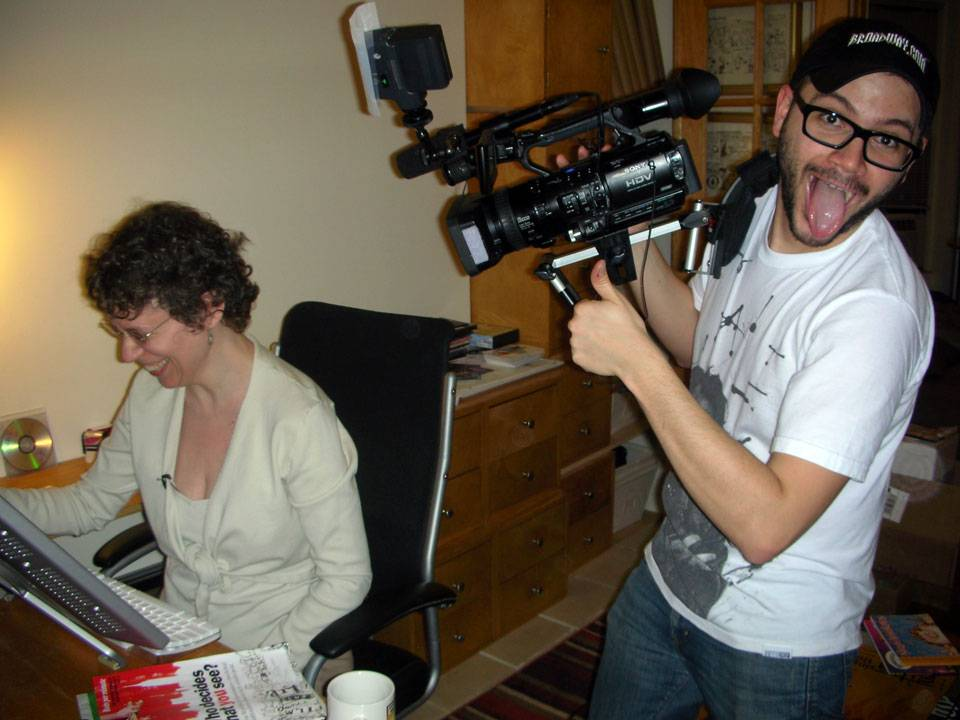
Jesse Zook Mann with Nina Paley shooting My First Time: The Tribeca Film Festival in 2008.

== Background, education, and career ==
Mann was born on April 13, 1980, in Manhattan, NY, and attended Walt Whitman High School on Long Island, NY. In 1998 Mann attended Ithaca College’s television and radio program, where he directed several documentaries on local communities in the region, including The Southside Project, documenting Upstate New York’s involvement in the Underground Railroad.

After college Mann produced films on the Samish Indian Nation, and field produced the film Splitting Hairs that made its debut at Silverdocs, and was the most watched documentary film on Hulu upon its release. Mann was a producer for NBC’s LXTV brand for several years, working on Open House, First Look, and My First Time. Mann won an Emmy Award for Best Sport Special for My First Time's TV movie of the 2008 Summer Olympic Games featuring Tim Morehouse and Sandra Fong.

In 2010 Mann produced VICE's first original content for television on The Vice Guide to Everything for MTV. In 2012 he directed reality programing including Monster Mansions on Discovery Networks, and Oddities San Francisco on the Science Channel.

In December 2012, Mann released his first independent film, Punk Jews, documenting Jewish subcultures in New York City. The film opened to sold out screenings at the 92nd Street Y and The Contemporary Jewish Museum in San Francisco. It was featured in the front page of The New York Times website and received features in The New Yorker, Haaretz, and international television coverage.

in 2019 Mann launched Mental Health Media, a non-profit media platform fiscally sponsored by the Northwest Film Forum focusing on education around innovative treatments of depression and mental illness.
