= Italian Spiderman =

- Promotional poster
- Directed by: Dario Russo
- Starring: "Franco Franchetti" (David Ashby) "Leombruno Tosca"
- Production company: Alrugo Entertainment
- Release date: 8 November 2007
- Country: Australia
- Languages: Italian (English subtitles)
- Budget: AU$9,500

Italian Spiderman (Note: The title of Italian Spiderman is intentionally spelled without the hyphen present in Spider-Man) is an Australian short film parody of Italian action–adventure films of the 1960s and 1970s, first released on YouTube in 2007. The parody purports to be a "lost Italian film" by Alrugo Entertainment, an Australian film-making collective formed by Dario Russo, Tait Wilson, David Ashby, Will Spartalis and Boris Repasky.

A trailer was released, followed by a full-length short feature composed of ten mini-episodes.

== Plot ==
Italian Spiderman (David Ashby, credited as "Franco Franchetti") faces a stranger in a game of blackjack. The stranger suggests raising the stakes and threatens to kill Italian Spiderman if he loses, to which Italian Spiderman agrees. The stranger draws a king and an ace, and, believing he has won, prepares to shoot Italian Spiderman. However, Italian Spiderman draws the same cards and immediately attacks the stranger's henchmen with a shotgun. The stranger is revealed to be the supervillain Captain Maximum (Leombruno Tosca), who escapes by transforming into a snake as Italian Spiderman flees the scene on his motorcycle. Meanwhile, an asteroid from a distant galaxy crashes on Earth, where Professor Bernardi (Carmine Russo) discovers it. Upon researching it, he discovers that it contains a substance that can create duplicates of any living being and decides that Italian Spiderman is the only one who can have it. A crocodile-themed supervillain named Coccodrillo breaks into Italian Spiderman's home, but Italian Spiderman kills him before traveling to Professor Bernardi's laboratory to get the asteroid.

Captain Maximum, who is interested in using the asteroid for his plans, attacks in an attempt to steal it. After failing, he transforms the Professor into a snake. Captain Maximum later intercepts Italian Spiderman and steals the asteroid, but gives him the chance to win it back if he can beat him in a surfing contest. After realizing that Italian Spiderman is better at surfing than he is, he tries to win by cheating, but fails when Italian Spiderman summons penguins to help him win. When Italian Spiderman returns home, Captain Maximum's henchmen attack him and shoot him with a tranquilizer dart.

As Italian Spiderman awakens in Captain Maximum's lair, Maximum shoots Professor Bernardi. As he dies, Bernardi gives Italian Spiderman a potion made from the asteroid. Italian Spiderman attacks Captain Maximum's headquarters and, despite having the potion, overpowers his henchmen with guns and his superpowers alone. He later returns home with the Professor's niece, Jessica (Susanna Dekker). When a gigantic Captain Maximum lays siege to the city, Italian Spiderman finally drinks the potion and grows to his size to fight him.

== Crew ==
- Director – Dario Russo
- Producer – Dario Russo
- Writers – Dario Russo, Tait Wilson, David Ashby, Will Spartalis, and Boris Repasky
- Director of Photography – Sam King
- Production Design – Tait Wilson
- Costume Design and Makeup – Sophie Spalding and Chloe Spalding
- Prop Builders – Bluey Byrne and Brad Maddern
- Sound Design & Score – Will Spartalis
- Original Music – Dario Russo, Will Spartalis and Josh Van Looy
- Editor – Dario Russo
- Gaffer – Sarah Macdonald
- 1st Camera Assistant – Vivyan Madigan
- Grip – Henry Smith
- Squirrel Grip – Matt Veseley
- Production Assistant – Sarah Bond
- Stills Photography – Lucy Spartalis

== Project history ==
The project began as a trailer for a non-existent film, created by director Dario Russo. It was filmed on one 16mm roll of film in one day. The trailer was partly a parody of the 1968 film Danger: Diabolik. Once it was uploaded online, the trailer went viral and got several million views. Dario Russo then went to the South Australian Film Corporation and was given an investment of 9,500 Australian dollars to expand the trailer into a full series.

In May 2010, Alrugo Entertainment announced its dissolution.

Due to the success of Italian Spiderman, the Special Broadcasting Service contacted Dario Russo and David Ashby expressing interest in creating a television adaptation, but copyright issues caused the project to be dropped. In its place, the SBS commissioned them to create the show Danger 5 with a budget of 1.5 million Australian dollars.

In 2018, Phil Lord and Christopher Miller expressed interest in including Italian Spiderman as a character in Spider-Man: Across the Spider-Verse, although this never came to fruition. According to Joaquim Dos Santos in 2023, the character could not be used because he was not owned by Marvel. He stated:

We watched this thing called Italian Spiderman. I don't know if you guys are familiar with it, but it's bonkers. It's completely bootleg, it's not owned by anybody except the crazy people that made it on the internet. We tried for Italian Spiderman at some point. Marvel was like, "We don't know what you're talking about, dude. That’s not ours," so yeah...

— Joaquim Dos Santos
