= King Changó =

American Latin ska band

- Origin: United States
- Genres: Latin; ska
- Years active: 1996–2003; 2020–present
- Labels: Luaka Bop; Warner Bros.
- Members: José Andrés Blanco; Ruben Verde; Luis Eduardo Blanco; Luis Jesús Ruiz; Miguel Oldenburg; Fernando Vélez; Martin Adrian Cunningham; Mike Wagner; Andy Shaw; Glenda Lee; Jason Anderson; Vincent Veloso; Ramón Nova; Francisco "Cizco" Triquiñuela Vasquez; Ray Lugo
- Website: kingchango.com

King Changó is a Latin ska band from New York City, New York with roots in Venezuela. Its name comes from Changó, the Afro-Cuban god of war.

José Andrés Blanco (Blanquito Man) died on November 16, 2017, due to complications from colon cancer. In 2020, Blanco's brother and former keyboardist, Luis Eduardo Blanco (Negrito Man) reformed the band as a three-piece and has continued to tour under the King Changó name.

== Members ==
- José Andrés Blanco, (Blanquito Man) – vocals and percussion
- Ruben Verde – guitars
- Luis Eduardo Blanco, (Negrito Man) – keyboard, cuatro and percussion
- Luis Jesús Ruiz, (El Pulpo) – drums and percussion
- Miguel Oldenburg – guitar
- Fernando Vélez – percussion
- Martin Adrian Cunningham, (Martín Perna) – tenor saxophone
- Mike Wagner – trombone and guitar
- Andy Shaw – bass
- Glenda Lee – bass
- Jason Anderson, (Willie Dinamita)
- Vincent Veloso saxophone, trumpet, trombone, flute
- Ramón Nova
- Rodney Shelby Siau – trumpet
- Efrain Jurado Olivares, (Cachorro) – keyboard
- Jason Seymour – trombone
- Candice Cannabis (Blonde Phantom) – vocals
- Ray Lugo – vocals

== Discography ==
=== Albums ===
- King Changó (1996)
- The Return of El Santo (2000)

=== Compilations ===
- Silencio=Muerte: Red Hot + Latin – "Quien Quiera Que Seas" (English: "Whoever You Are") with Geggy Tah (1997)
- Outlandos D'Americas: A Rock En Espanol Tribute To The Police – "Venezuelan in New York" (a cover of Englishman in New York by Sting) (2000)
- Putamaya Presents Mo' Vida!- "Melting Pot" (2000)
- Moon Records presents: 100% Latin Ska Vol.1 - "Latin Ska" (1995)
