= Mipsterz =

Mipsterz, stylized as #MIPSTERZ (short for Muslim Hipsters), are an international group of primarily hipster Muslims (loosely defined, and not limited to Millennials) who have evolving views on religion, identity, community, politics, and culture. Prior to 2012, the term "#MIPSTERZ" did not exist, though the application of "Muslim Hipsters" had been used. Abbas Rattani is credited as the creator of the formal #MIPSTERZ movement, culture, community, and identity Other known #MIPSTERZ include tech entrepreneur Layla Shaikley, author & artist Sara Alfageeh, Riz Ahmed, Ibtihaj Muhmmad, Hasan Minhaj, Linda Sarsour, Reza Aslan, Nas Daily, Amina Wadud, Omid Safi, Rabia of Basra, and Jalal al-din Rumi.

Mipsterz have been self-described on their Google Groups community page as:

"The 'Mipsterz' first began as a satirical, thought-generating jab at corporate culture and evolved into a limitless collective that empowers individuals to find coolness in themselves and share their God-given gifts with all. You see, hipster rule number 1: never self-identify as a hipster—namely, because these labels are a social constructed means of typecasting limitless beings. But let’s be honest, (and this is where the tongue-in-cheek ethos of Mipsterz enters), you are a hipster."

The group has published various videos, including a controversial music video for Jay-Z's "Somewhere in America," as well as original programming such as Hot Sauce x White Sauce, the concert series SUNDAYS/cool, an online magazine: The Field Between, and the fashion-activism project BOY/BYE.

As of 2017, the group currently functions as a non-profit arts and culture collective with a focus on presenting and producing original content by Muslim creatives in the domains of film, music, and illustration. A marketplace was opened in early 2018 which features their work.
