= King Changó (album) =

Studio album by King Changó
- Released: August 27, 1996
- Genre: Ska, Latin
- Length: 56:36
- Label: Luaka Bop/Warner Bros.

King Changó chronology
King Changó (1996)	The Return of El Santo (2000)

Professional ratings
Review scores
Source	Rating
Allmusic	3/5 stars

King Changó is the self-titled debut album of Latin ska band King Changó.

== Track listing ==
1. "Don't Drop Your Pants" (J.A. Blanco, Glenda Lee, R. Verde) – 4:02
2. "Confesión" (King Changó) – 5:40
3. "God Damn Killers" (J.A. Blanco, Verde) – 3:41
4. "So Sweet" (J.A. Blanco, Michael Cunningham, Verde) – 5:24
5. "Empty Hands Are My Weapon" (King Changó) – 5:46
6. "Melting Pot Intro" (J.A. Blanco, Martin Cunningham) – 0:53
7. "Melting Pot" (J.A. Blanco, Luis Eduardo Blanco, Ma. Cunningham, Lee) – 3:42
8. "Revolution/Cumbia Reggae" (J.A. Blanco, L.E. Blanco, Lee, Luis Jesús Ruíz) – 3:14
9. "African Fever" (King Changó) – 1:46
10. "Pisando la Serpiente" (J.A. Blanco, Ma. Cunningham, Lee, Verde, Mike Wagner) – 3:50
11. "Latin Ska" (J.A. Blanco, Verde) – 4:28
12. "Torero" (J.A. Blanco, L.E. Blanco, Wagner) – 3:12
13. "French Lady" (J.A. Blanco, Lee, Verde, Wagner) - 10:58
