= Hooded Fang (band) =

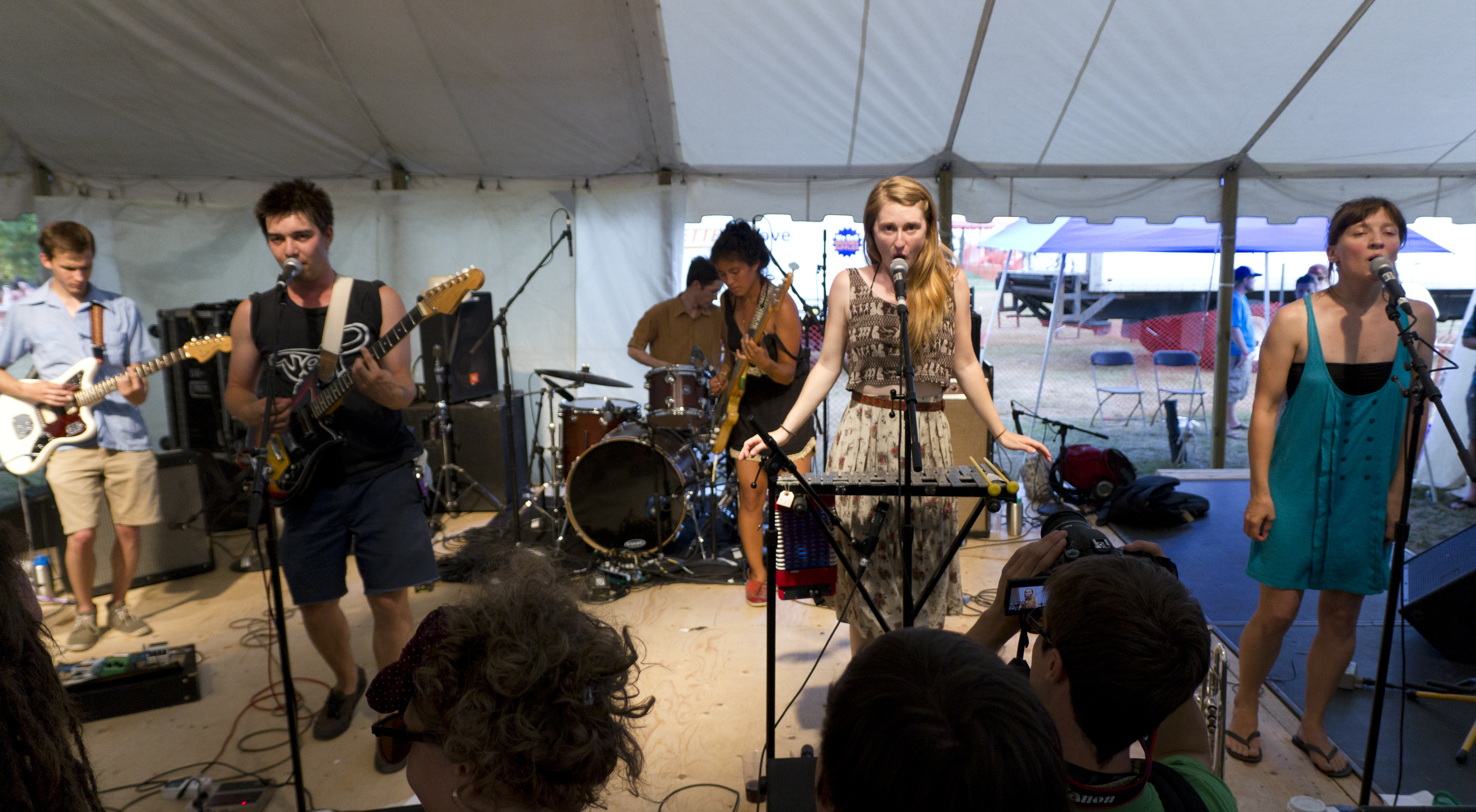
- Hooded Fang performing at the 2011 Hillside Festival

Background information
- Origin: Toronto, Ontario, Canada
- Genres: Indie rock, surf rock, punk rock
- Years active: 2007–present
- Labels: Daps Records (distributor Outside), Full Time Hobby
- Members: April Aliermo; Daniel Lee; Lane Halley; D. Alex Meeks
- Past members: Nicholas Hune-Brown; Lorna Wright; Julia Barnes
- Website: hoodedfang.com

Hooded Fang was a Canadian indie rock band, formed in Toronto, Ontario, Canada, in 2007.

== Band history ==
The band led by twin lyricists, bassist April Aliermo and guitarist/vocalist Daniel Lee, formed in 2007, and named themselves after a character from the children's book Jacob Two-Two and the Hooded Fang.

Hooded fang's debut recording EP was self-released on 15 September 2008. Their first full-length album, Album, was self-released on 6 August 2010, distributed by Outside Music. The band released their debut UK album, Tosta Mista, in March 2012 on the UK independent record label, Full Time Hobby.

Their third album, Gravez was released in April 2013.

== Band members ==
- April Aliermo – bass guitar, lyricist (2007–present)
- Julia Barnes – trombone, vocals (2007–?)
- Daniel Lee – lyricist, lead vocals, drums, guitar (2007–present)
- Lane Halley – lead guitar, trumpet (2008–present)
- Nicholas Hune-Brown – keyboard, (2007–2011)
- D. Alex Meeks – drums (2010–present)
- David Wachsmuth - lead guitar, bass guitar (2007-2008)
- Lorna Wright – lead vocals, guitar, glockenspiel (2007–2011)

== Discography ==
=== EPs ===
EP

- Released: 15 September 2008
- Label: Hooded Fang (Distributed by Outside)
- Writer: Daniel Lee, April Aliermo, Nick Hune-Brown
- Tracks: "Land of Giants", "The Pageant", "Train Station", "Circles n Blocks", "Fall Leaves"

=== Albums ===
Album

- Released: 6 August 2010
- Label: DAPS RECORDS (Distributed by Outside)
- Writer: Daniel Lee, April Aliermo
- Tracks: "Younger Days", "Straight Up the Dial", "Laughing", "Mutant Bear", "Too Late Night", "Green River", "Highway Steam", "Promise Land", "Sleep Song", "Ghosts", "Almost Done", "Love Song"

Tosta Mista

- Released: 26 March 2012
- Label: DAPS RECORDS (Distributed by Outside), Full Time Hobby (UK)
- Tracks: "Big Blue i", "Clap", "ESP", "Brahma", "Tosta Mista", "Big Blue ii", "Jubb", "Vacationation", "Den of Love", "Big Blue iii"
- Singles: ESP

Gravez

- Released: 28 May 2013
- Label: DAPS RECORDS (Distributed by Outside), Full Time Hobby (UK)
- Tracks: "Dry Range In", "Graves", "Ode To Subterrania", "Bye Bye Land", "Wasteland", "Sailor Bull", "Trasher", "Neverminding", "Genes", "Dry Range Out
- Singles: Graves, Ode To Subterrania

Venus on Edge

- Released: 2016
- Label: DAPS RECORDS (Distributed by Outside),
- Singles: Tunnel Vision, Impressions, Dead Battery

Dynasty House

- Released: 2017
- Label: DAPS RECORDS (Distributed by Outside),
- Producer: Daniel Lee

== See also ==
- List of bands from Canada
