= Record Kicks =

Italian record label

Record Kicks is an independent record label based in Milan, Italy, set up in 2003 by Nicolò Pozzoli (a.k.a. Nick Recordkicks) and specializing in both new and vintage black sounds: Deep Funk, Soul, Northern Soul, Afrobeat, Rocksteady, Dancefloor Jazz.

Record Kicks has released records by Hannah Williams & The Affirmations, Martha High, Tanika Charles, Hannah Williams & The Tastemakers, Third Coast Kings, Trio Valore, The Liberators, Nick Pride & The Pimptones, Baby Charles, Diplomats Of Solid Sound, Dojo Cuts, Kokolo Afrobeat Orchestra, Milano Jazz Dance Combo, Calibro 35 and The BlueBeaters among others. In addition to single artists' releases, the label has releasied two series of compilations: Soulshaker (currently at Volume 7) and Let's Boogaloo (currently at Volume 6).

In 2008, Record Kicks released the soundtrack for Australian parody film Italian Spiderman, which satirizes Italian B-movies from the 1960s and 1970s .

While pressing both LPs and CDs Record Kicks still produces singles on 45s (usually in a restricted limited edition) and 12" EPs.

Alongside the record label, Record Kicks has its own music publishing division: Edizioni Record Kicks is registered with SIAE, the Italian authors' and composers' collecting society.

On 9 November 2013, the label celebrated its ten-year anniversary with a special night at 100 Club in London and a celebrative compilation called Record Kicks 10th.

== Discography ==
=== Artist albums ===
Artist	Title	Catalogue no.	Release year
Link Quartet	Italian Playboys	RKX 009	2006
The New Mastersound	Re-Mixed	RKX 019	2008
Baby Charles	Baby Charles	RKX 020	2008
Diplomats Of Solid Sound feat. The Diplomettes	Diplomats Of Solid Sound feat. The Diplomettes	RKX 022	2008
Trio Valore	Return Of The Iron Monkey	RKX 023	2008
Kokolo Afrobeat Orchestra	Heavy Hustling	RKX 025	2009
Dojo Cuts feat. Roxie Ray	Dojo Cuts feat. Roxie Ray	RKX 026	2009
Milano Jazz Dance Combo	Milano Jazz Dance Combo	RKX 027	2009
Underbelly feat. Roxie Ray	Underbelly feat. Roxie Ray	RKX 030	2010
Ray Harris & The Fusion Experience	Ray Harris & The Fusion Experience	RKX 031	2010
Diplomats Of Solid Sound	What Goes Around Comes Around	RKX 032	2010
The Liberators	The Liberators	RKX 035	2011
Nick Pride & The Pimptones	Midnight Feast Of Jazz	RKX 036	2011
The Baker Brothers	Time To Testify	RKX 038	2011
Third Coast Kings	Third Coast Kings	RKX 039	2012
Hannah Williams & The Tastemakers	A Hill Of Feathers	RKX 040	2012
Dojo Cuts feat. Roxie Ray	Take From Me	RKX 041	2012
The Strides	Reclamation	RKX 042	2011
The Liberators	Power Struggle	RKX 044	2013
Calibro 35	Traditori Di Tutti	RKX 046	2013
Third Coast Kings	West Grand Boulevard	RKX 047	2014
The Bluebeaters	Everybody Knows	RKX 048	2015
Calibro 35	S.P.A.C.E.	RKX 049	2016
Marta Ren & The Groovelvets	Stop Look Listen	RKX 060	2016
The Tibbs	Takin' Over	RKX 061	2016
Il Complesso Di Tadà	Il Complesso Di Tadà	RKX 062	2016
Hannah Williams & The Affirmations	Late Nights & Heartbreak	RKX 063	2016

=== Compilations ===
Artist	Title	Catalogue no.	Release year
Various	SoulShaker	RKX 002	2003
Various	Let's Boogaloo	RKX 003	2004
Various	Let's Boogaloo vol. 2	RKX 004	2005
Various	SoulShaker vol. 2	RKX 010	2006
Various	Let's Boogaloo vol. 3	RKX 012	2007
Various	SoulShaker vol. 3	RKX 017	2007
Various	Dj Andy Smith presents: Let's Boogaloo vol. 4	RKX 018	2007
Various	SoulShaker vol. 4	RKX 021	2008
Various	SoulShaker vol. 5	RKX 024	2008
Various	SoulShaker vol. 6	RKX 028	2009
Various	Mo' Record Kicks	RKX 029	2010
Various	Jazzman Gerald presents: Let's Boogaloo vol. 5	RKX 033	2010
Various	SoulShaker vol. 7	RKX 034	2010
Various	Smoove presents: Mo' Record Kicks Act II	RKX 037	2011
Various	Record Kicks 10th	RKX 043	2013
Various	Dean Rudland presents: Let's Boogaloo vol. 6	RKX 043	2013

=== 45s singles ===
Artist	Title	Catalogue no.	Release year
Frank Popp Ensemble / Big Boss Man	Leave Me Alone / The Hawk	RK45 001	2005
Smoove / Speedometer	Power Generation / Big balls	RK45 002	2006
Alice Russel feat Quantic / JTQ	Somebody Is Gonna Love You / Tough Chicken pt. 1	RK45 003	2006
Betty Wright / Shang Lee	Man of mine / Psychedelic Sambai	RK45 004	2006
Robert Moore	Everything's Gonna Be Allright / Can't Help Myself	RK45 005	2006
The Poets of Rhythm / Phat Fred	Practice What You Preach / Stay On The Groove	RK45 006	2006
Hector Rivera	Chance Of Romance / Chance Of Romance (Instrumental)	RK45 007	2006
Honey Cone / Barrino Brothers	Sunday Morning People / Trapped In A Love	RK45 008	2007
Smoove / Enri	I'm A Man / The Performer	RK45 009	2007
Yvonne Fair / Little Denice	Say Yeah Yeah / Check me out	RK45 010	2007
New Mastersounds / Steven Perri & Zamaun	Drop it down (B rmx) / Street Scene	RK45 011	2007
Baby Charles	Back Of My Hand / Coming From Higher Place	RK45 012	2007
Baby Charles	I Bet You Look Good on the Dancefloor / Time Wasting	RK45 014	2008
Diplomats of Solid Sound	Plenty nasty / Hurt Me So (Lack of Afro rmx)	RK45 015	2008
Kokolo Afrobeat Orchestra	Girls On Film / Girls On Film (Instrumental)	RK45 016	2008
Enzo Bontempi	Italian Spiderman Theme / Bangarang	RK45 017	2008
Floyd Lawson & The Hearts Of Stone	K Gee / It Only Takes A Minute Girl	RK45 018	2008
Floyd Lawson & The Hearts Of Stone	Air I Breathe / Rated X	RK45 019	2008
Trio Valore	Rehab / Put Em Down	RK45 020	2008
Baby Charles	Hard Man To Please / Jackson Fingers	RK45 021	2008
Soulful Orchestra	Soul Burger / Soul Burger (Dj Tib rmx)	RK45 022	2008
Diplomats of Solid Sound	If You're Wrong (Lack Of Afro rmx) / If You're Wrong	RK45 023	2008
Soul Fantastic	Funky pluggin / Soul Train	RK45 024	2008
Kokolo Afrobeat Orchestra	Soul Power / Soul Power (Lack of Afro rmx)	RK45 025	2008
Dojo Cuts	The 1-2-3's / See And Don't See	RK45 026	2009
Milano Jazz Dance Combo	Much More (feat. Colonel Red) / Sam blues	RK45 027	2009
The Crabs Corporation	Let It Go / Reggae Power	RK45 028	2009
Ray Lugo's L.E.S. Express	I Dream Of Bahia (feat. Elani) / Get On Up (feat. Roxie Ray)	RK45 029	2009
Kokolo Afrobeat Orchestra feat. JoJo Kuo	Afrika man / Afrika Man (Diesler rmx)	RK45 030	2009
Gizelle Smith	June / June (Tm Juke rmx)	RK45 031	2009
The Privates Hammond Orchestra	I'm Sorry (Can I Please Go Home) / The battle of Yorker	RK45 032	2009
The Hi Fly Orchestra	Roda De Samba / Latinkick	RK45 033	2009
The Hawk / The Link Quartet	Don't Judge A Book By Its Cover / If You Wanna Be My Man (feat. Gizelle Smith)	RK45 034	2010
Underbelly feat. Roxie Ray	I Keep Heading On / Cold Toast	RK45 035	2010
Ray Lugo's L.E.S. EXPRESS feat. Roxie Ray	Love Me Good / If It Ain't True	RK45 036	2010
Diplomats Of Solid Sound	Back Off! / B-O-O-G-A-L-O-O	RK45 037	2010
The Crabs Corporation meet King Hammond	Bring Down The Birds (Flying High Mix)	RK45 038	2010
Third Coast Kings	Give Me Your Love / Tonic Stride	RK45 039	2010
Dojo Cuts	Grand Carnival / Ain't So Low	RK45 040	2010
The Baker Brothers	Once I Had A Friend / Once I Had A Friend (Instrumental)	RK45 041	2010
Diplomats Of Solid Sound / Ray Harris & The Fusion Experience	Let It Snow / Soulful Christmas	RK45 042	2010
Floyd Lawson	Roof Top Sugar / Ain't Going Nowhere	RK45 043	2011
Nick Pride & The Pimptones	Waitin' So Long / Lay It On The Line	RK45 044	2011
The Baker Brothers	The Young Patter / Patience	RK45 045	2011
Hanna Williams & The Tastemakers / Susan Cadogan & The Crabs Corporation	I'm A Good Woman / Day After Day	RK45 046	2013
The Revolution of St. Vincent / The Rolling Tones	The Little You Say / It's A Feeling	RK45 047	2013
The Liberators	Cairo Uprising	RK45 048	2013
Machito & His Orchestra feat. Graciela / Giobel & The Latin Chords	Hold On (I'm Coming) / We Belong Together	RK45 049	2014
Marta Ren & The Groovelvets	Summer's Gone (Didn't Swim) / 2 Kinds Of Men	RK45 050	2013
Calibro 35	Giulia Mon Amour / Notte In Bovisa	RK45 051	2013
Calibro 35	Vendetta / You, Filthy Bastards!	RK45 052	2014
Third Coast Kings	Just Move / Ice Cream Man	RK45 053	2014
Trio Valore	Crazy / #LiarsAndCheaters	RK45 054	2014
The Bluebeaters	Toxic (one drop version) / Catch That Teardrop	RK45 057	2014
Calibro 35	The Butcher's Bride / Get Carter	RK45 056	2014
The Bluebeaters	Roll With It	RK45 058	2015

=== EPs ===
Artist	Title	Catalogue no.	Release year	Format
Eddie Roberts Quintet	Giorgio's brother (Lack Of Afro rmx) / Wait A Minute (Lack Of Afro rmx)	RK12 001	2007	12"
Unity feat. Lizzy Parks	Escape EP	RK12 002	2007	12"
Fab Samperi & Dj Farrapo	Spaghetti Samba	RK12 003	2007	12"
Ray Harris & The Fusion Experience	Scaramunga EP	RK12 004	2010	12"
Trio Valore	#Liarsandcheaters	-	2014	digital
