= Angélique Kidjo =

Beninese musician

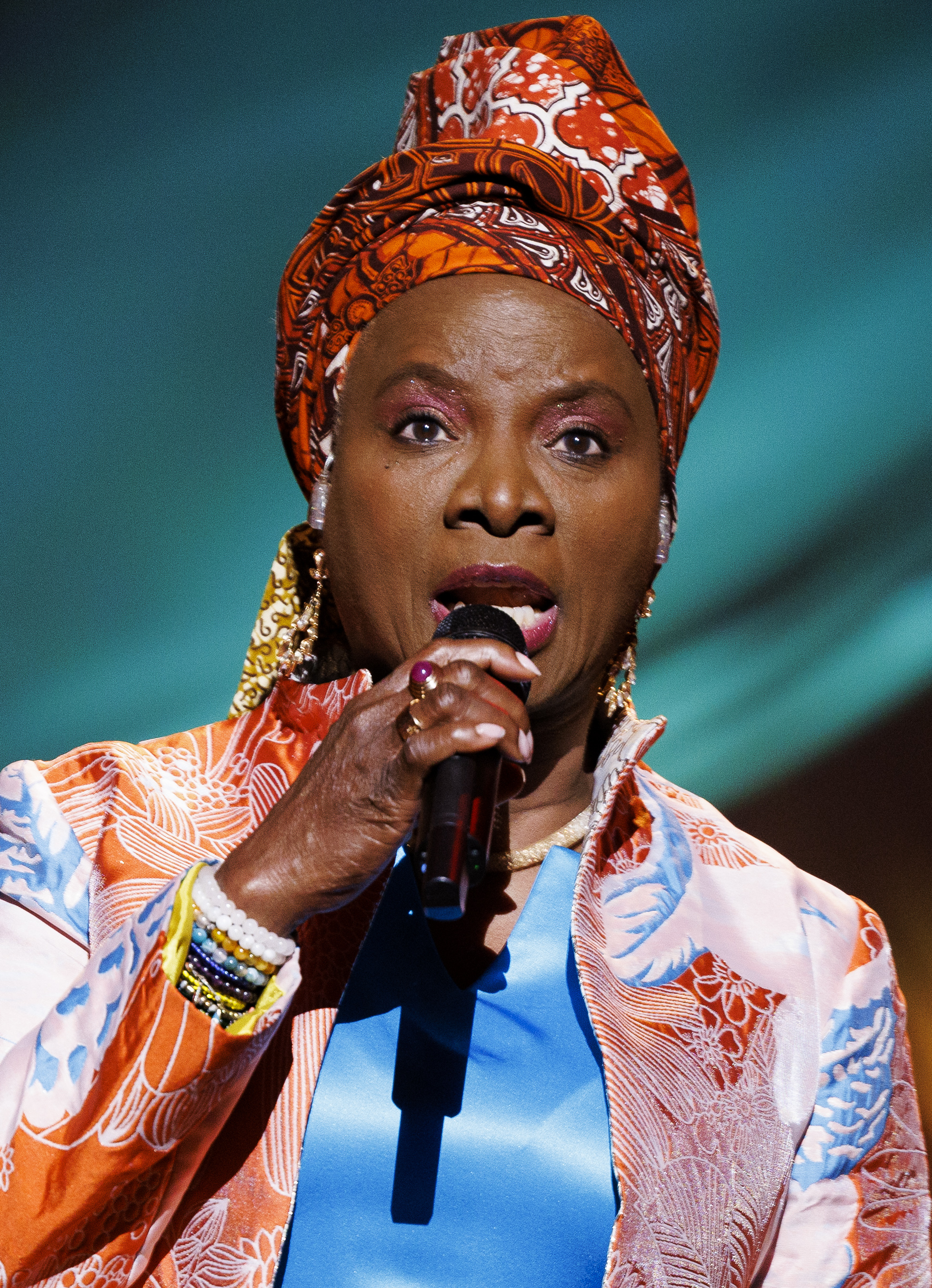
- Kidjo performing at the Gershwin Prize in 2023
- Born: Angélique Kpasseloko Hinto Hounsinou Kandjo Manta Zogbin Kidjo; Ouidah, French Dahomey (now Benin)
- Occupations: Singer; actress; activist
- Years active: 1982–present
- Spouse: Jean Hébrail (m. 1987)
- Musical career
- Genres: Afropop; Afrobeat; reggae; world music; world fusion; worldbeat; jazz; gospel; Latin
- Instrument: Vocals
- Labels: Island; Mango; PolyGram; Columbia; Razor & Tie; 429
- Website: kidjo.com

Angélique Kpasseloko Hinto Hounsinou Kandjo Manta Zogbin Kidjo (/ˌɒ̃ʒəˈliːk ˈkɪdʒuː, - ˈkɪdʒoʊ/ born 14 July 1960) is a French-Beninese musician, actress, and activist. Kidjo has won five Grammy Awards and a Polar Music Prize. She has collaborated with artists including Alicia Keys, Peter Gabriel, John Legend, Philip Glass, Bono, Yo-Yo Ma, and Burna Boy. She is the second African artist — and the first of African ethnicity — to receive a star on the Hollywood Walk of Fame. She performed at the Tokyo 2020 Olympic Games Opening Ceremony on July 23, 2021. In 2021, Time magazine included her in its list of the 100 most influential people in the world. Kidjo is fluent in five languages: Fon, French, Yorùbá, Gen (Mina) and English. She sings in all of them, and she also has her own personal language, which includes words that serve as song titles such as "Batonga". Kidjo often uses Benin's traditional Zilin vocal technique and vocalese.

== Early life ==
Angélique Kpasseloko Hinto Hounsinou Kandjo Manta Zogbin Kidjo was born in Ouidah, French Dahomey, in what became Benin. Her father is from the Fon people of Ouidah and her mother from the Yoruba people. Her father was a musician, and her mother worked as a choreographer and theatre director. She grew up listening to Yoruba and Beninese traditional music, Miriam Makeba, Hugh Masekela, James Brown, Manu Dibango, Otis Redding, Jimi Hendrix, Fela Kuti, Stevie Wonder, Osibisa and Santana. By the time she was six years old, Kidjo was performing with her mother's theatre troupe.

She started singing in her school band, Les Sphinx, and found success as a teenager with her version of Miriam Makeba's "Les Trois Z", which was played on national radio. Aged 20, she recorded the album Pretty with Cameroonian producer Ekambi Brilliant and her brother Oscar. It featured the songs "Ninive", "Gbe Agossi", and a tribute to the singer Bella Bellow, one of her role models. The success of the album allowed her to tour all over West Africa. Continuing political conflicts in Benin prevented her from being an independent artist in her own country and led her to relocate to Paris in 1983.

== Paris ==
After moving to France, Kidjo initially planned to become a human rights lawyer, but ended up studying music. While working various day jobs to pay for her tuition, Kidjo studied music at the CIM, a jazz school in Paris, where she met musician and producer Jean Hebrail, with whom she has composed most of her music and whom she married in 1987. She started out as a backup singer in local bands. In 1985, she became the front singer of Jasper van 't Hof's Euro-African jazz/rock band Pili Pili. Three Pili Pili studio albums followed: Jakko (1987), Be In Two Minds (1988, produced by Marlon Klein) and Hotel Babo (1990). By the end of the 1980s, she had become one of the most popular live performers in Paris and recorded a solo album called Parakou for the Open Jazz Label. She met Island Records founder Chris Blackwell in Paris; Blackwell signed her to a record deal in 1991. She recorded four albums for Island until Blackwell's departure from the label. In 2000, she was signed in New York by Columbia Records, for whom she recorded two albums.

== Albums ==
=== Parakou ===
Kidjo's first international album Parakou, first released in 1989, was the beginning of a series of collaborations with producer and composer Jean Hébrail and featured Jasper van't Hof.

=== Logozo ===
Her first album for Island Records was recorded between Miami and Paris and produced by Miami Sound Machine drummer Joe Galdo and features Branford Marsalis and Manu DiBango on saxophones. It was released worldwide in 1991 and reached number one on the Billboard World Albums chart. Music videos for the singles "We We" and "Batonga" were released and Kidjo made her first world tour, headlining the Olympia Hall in Paris on October 31, 1992. Logozo is ranked number 37 in the Greatest Dance Albums of All Time list compiled by the Thump website.

=== Ayé ===
Released in 1994, the album Ayé was produced by David Z at Prince's Paisley Park Studios in Minnesota and by Will Mowat at Soul To Soul studio in London. It includes the single "Agolo", a song that addresses the issue of the environment, of which the video directed by Michel Meyer gave Kidjo her first Grammy nomination. Kidjo sang on the album in both Yoruba and Fon, often using the Beninese traditional zilin vocal technique. The song "Agolo" was used as the theme tune of the BBC World Service programme Everywoman (broadcast between March 1997 and April 2006).

=== Fifa ===
Kidjo and Hebrail traveled all over Benin in 1995 to record the traditional rhythms that formed the base for the Fifa album. Carlos Santana appears on "Naima", a piece Kidjo wrote for her daughter. The single "Wombo Lombo" and its video directed by Michel Meyer was a success all over Africa in 1996.

=== Trilogy ===
In 1998, she began recording a trilogy of albums (Oremi, Black Ivory Soul and Oyaya) exploring the African roots of the music of the Americas.

==== Oremi ====
Produced by Peter Mokran and Jean Hebrail, recorded in New York, Oremi is a collection of songs mixing African and African-American influences. Cassandra Wilson, Branford Marsalis, Kelly Price and Kenny Kirkland collaborated with Kidjo on this project. The opening track is a cover of Jimi Hendrix's "Voodoo Child".

==== Black Ivory Soul ====
In 2000, Kidjo traveled to Salvador de Bahia to start recording the Axe percussion grooves for this album, based on Afro-Brazilian culture. She worked with songwriters Carlinhos Brown and Vinicius Cantuária. On the Brazilian version of the album Gilberto Gil joined her on "Refavela" and Daniella Mercury on "Tumba". Dave Matthews appears in the song "Iwoya".

==== Oyaya! ====
Produced by Steve Berlin from Los Lobos and by the pianist Alberto Salas, released in 2004, Oyaya! mixes Latin and Caribbean music with African guitars. French Guyanese musician Henri Salvador joined Kidjo on the song "Le Monde Comme un Bébé".

=== Djin Djin ===
Kidjo released the album Djin Djin on May 1, 2007. Many guests appear on the album including Josh Groban, Carlos Santana, Alicia Keys, Joss Stone, Peter Gabriel, Amadou and Mariam, Ziggy Marley and Branford Marsalis. The title refers to the sound of a bell in Africa that greets each new day. The album, produced by Tony Visconti, won a Grammy for Best Contemporary World Music Album and an NAACP Image Award for Outstanding World Music Album.

=== Õÿö ===
Õÿö, released in Europe on January 18, 2010, and in America on April 6, 2010, pays tribute to the music of Kidjo's childhood in Benin. It mixes traditional music, Miriam Makeba's songs, classic soul of the 1960s and 1970s; including a song from the 1952 Bollywood film Aan, "Dil Main Chuppa Ke Pyar Ka". Dianne Reeves appears on Aretha Franklin's "Baby I Love You", Bono and John Legend on Curtis Mayfield's "Move On Up", for which Kidjo recorded a video with the Fela! dancers and Roy Hargrove on Santana's "Samba Pa Ti". Produced by Kidjo and Jean Hebrail, the album was arranged in conjunction with the Beninese guitarist Lionel Loueke. Õÿö was nominated for Best Contemporary World Music Album at the 53rd Grammy Awards.

=== Spirit Rising ===
Spirit Rising, the live album from Kidjo's PBS Special performance, was released in North America on February 22, 2012. It features a collection of songs from her entire career played live in Boston with special guests Ezra Koenig from Vampire Weekend, Dianne Reeves, Branford Marsalis, Christian McBride and Josh Groban. Kidjo sang a version of "Redemption Song" with the Kuumba Singers.

=== Eve ===
On January 28, 2014, Kidjo the album Eve, which was dedicated to the women of Africa. Kidjo stated that "Eve is an album of remembrance of African women I grew up with and a testament to the pride and strength that hide behind the smile that masks everyday troubles." She recorded the album in New York with the Beninese percussionists from the Gangbe Brass Band and an ensemble of session musicians. Performers on the album include Beninese guitarist Lionel Loueke, Dominic James, Steve Jordan, Christian McBride, and producer Patrick Dillett. Guest musicians on the album include Rostam Batmanglij from Vampire Weekend, Nigerian folk singer Aṣa on "Eva", pianist Dr. John on "Kulumbu"; the Kronos Quartet and the Luxembourg Philharmonic Orchestra. The traditional Congolese song "Bana" features the vocals of Kidjo's mother Yvonne.

The album debuted at number 1 in the Billboard World Music chart. It was rated No. 1 among world music albums for 2014 by Radio France Internationale. Its opening track, "M'Baamba", featured in The New York Times' "Top 10 songs of 2014" list. Eve won the Grammy Award for Best Global Music Album at the 57th Grammy Awards.

=== Angélique Kidjo Sings with the Orchestre Philharmonique Du Luxembourg ===
On March 31, 2015, Kidjo released her collaboration with the Luxembourg Philharmonic Orchestra. The album contains orchestral versions of nine songs from previous albums and two original songs: Nanae and Otishe. All the songs are arranged by Gast Waltzing and David Laborier and the orchestra is conducted by Gast Waltzing. Tony Hillier of Rhythms Magazine described it as "arguably the most ambitious and spiritually arresting album the New York-based West African singer has recorded in a long and distinguished career". The album won the Grammy Award for Best Global Music Album category.

=== Remain in Light ===
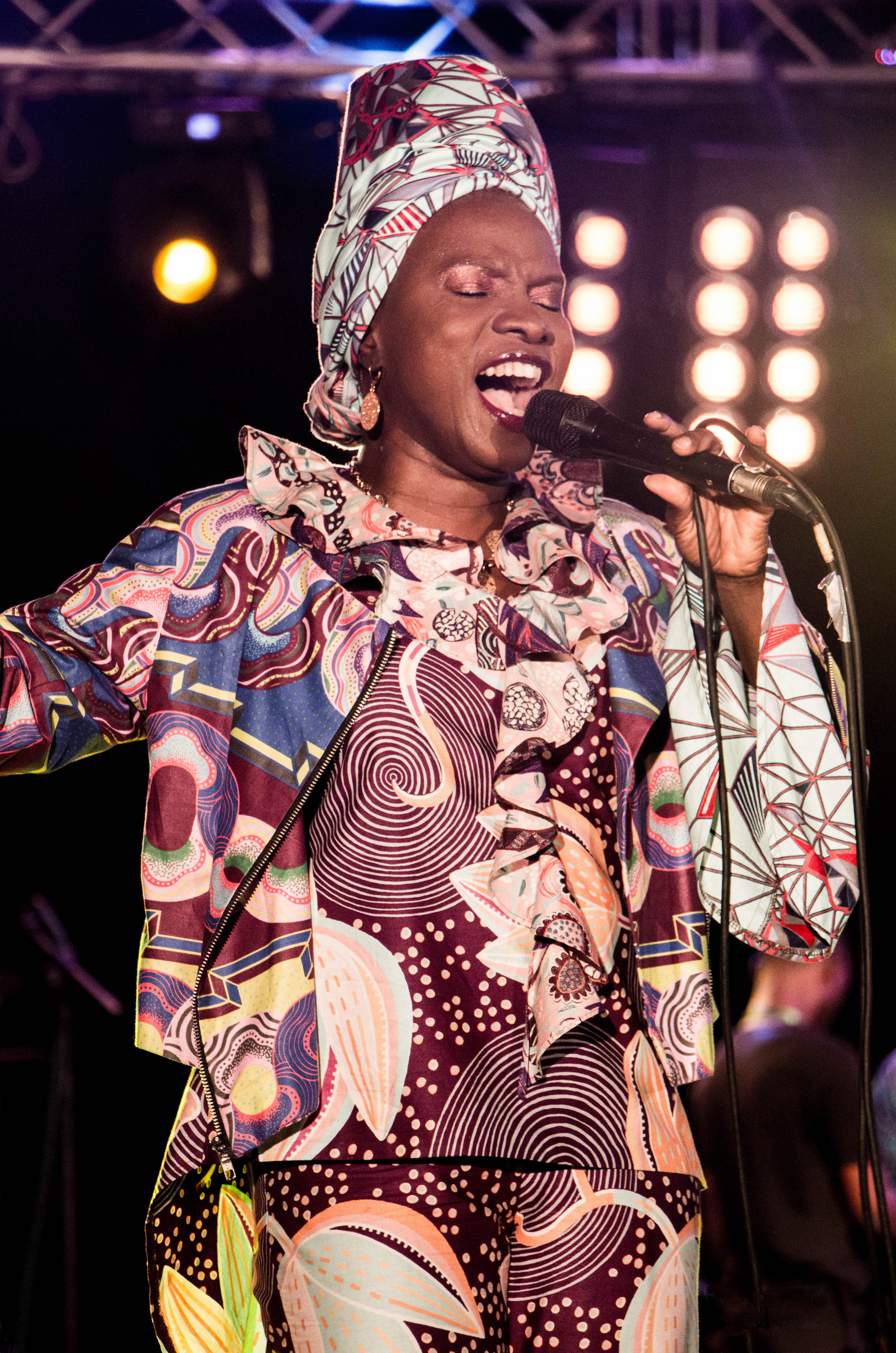
Kidjo in 2017

Released on June 8, 2018, Remain in Light is a track-by-track re-imagination of Talking Heads' landmark 1980 album, one of the most acclaimed albums of the 1980s (placing number 39 on Rolling Stone's 2023 Best Album's of All Time list and earning a retrospective 10 from Pitchfork in 2018). Kidjo partnered with producer Jeff Bhasker to create the record, deeply influenced by music from West Africa, notably Fela Kuti's Afrobeat. With her version of Remain in Light, Kidjo wanted to celebrate the music of Talking Heads and Brian Eno with her own vocals, as well as percussion, horn orchestrations, and select lyrics performed in languages from her home country. Remain in Light features appearances by Ezra Koenig of Vampire Weekend, Blood Orange, Tony Allen, Antibalas Horns, Kidjo's longtime guitarist Dominic James, and percussionist Magatte Sow. Visual artist Kerry James Marshall created the album artwork.

=== Celia ===
Kidjo's tribute to Cuban singer Celia Cruz was released on April 19, 2019. It is produced by David Donatien and featured Tony Allen, Meshell Ndegeocello and the Gangbe Brass Band. The Guardian called the album "magnificent", and the Financial Times gave it 5 stars. The album includes songs spanning all of Celia Cruz's career reinvented with an Afrobeat feel. Of the song "Quimbara", New York Times critic Jon Pareles says: "Backed by Michelle Ndegeocello on bass, the Afrobeat pioneer Tony Allen on drums, Dominic James on guitars and the Gangbe Brass Band, Kidjo reconnects the salsa original to West Africa, layering the song with a tumbling six-beat rhythm, a brass-band undertow and a tangle of scurrying guitar lines while she belts with enough grit to rival Cruz herself." Kidjo won the Grammy Award for "Best World Music Album" for Celia on January 26, 2020.

=== Mother Nature ===
On June 18, 2021, the album Mother Nature was released. It features many collaborations with young African producers and singers including Yemi Alade, Burna Boy Mr Eazi, Zeynab, Shungudzo, Sampa The Great, Rexxie, African legend Salif Keita and French singer Matthieu Chedid. Music videos for the songs "Dignity", "Africa, One of a Kind," and "Mother Nature" featuring Sting have been released. The Independent said: "the 15th album by Angelique Kidjo has the feel of a grand homecoming: celebratory and inclusive, with an acute sense of place and time". The Sunday Times said: "the music ... is infectious ... the rhythms are a combination of modern and traditional fused with state-of-the-art production values. Kidjo's impassioned voice evokes memories of the great Miriam Makeba". The Financial Times called Mother Nature "a rallying pan-African collaboration"

=== Hope!! ===
Kidjo released her album Hope!! on April 24, 2026 and had released the album's lead single, "Fall on Me", featuring PJ Morton. On March 27, 2026, Kidjo released the second single and its accompanying music video, "Aye Kan (Are You Coming Back)" featuring Nigerian singer Ayra Starr. On August 28, 2026, Kidjo released the new version of the single "Bando" featuring Pharrell Williams and Quavo and its accompanying music video directed by Paul Hunter (director) and shot in Grigny, Essonne

== Memoir: Spirit Rising, My Life, My Music ==
Kidjo wrote a memoir with Rachel Wenrick titled Spirit Rising. It was published by HarperCollins on January 7, 2014. Desmond Tutu wrote the preface and Alicia Keys the foreword. On the back cover, Bill Clinton is quoted as saying: "The only thing bigger than Angélique Kidjo's voice is her heart. In this evocative memoir, Kidjo chronicles an inspiring life of music and activism, and raises a passionate call for freedom, dignity, and the rights of people everywhere."

== Collaboration with Philip Glass: IFÉ ==
January 17, 2014, saw the premiere of IFÉ: Three Yoruba songs for Angelique Kidjo and the Orchestre Philharmonique Du Luxembourg conducted by Jonathan Stockhammer at the Philharmonie hall in Luxembourg. Philip Glass wrote the orchestral music based on three creation poems in Yoruba sung by Kidjo. In the program notes, Philip Glass says: "Angelique, together we have built a bridge that no one has walked on before." The piece made its American premiere with the San Francisco Symphony to a sold-out crowd in the Louise M. Davies Symphony Hall on July 10, 2015.

== Advocacy ==
Kidjo has been a UNICEF Goodwill Ambassador since 2002. With UNICEF, she has travelled to many countries in Africa. Reports on her visits can be found on the UNICEF site: Benin, Senegal, Ethiopia, Tanzania, Syria, Malawi, Uganda, Kenya, Sierra Leone, Zimbabwe, South Africa and Haiti.

Along with Mary Louise Cohen and John R. Phillips, Kidjo founded the Batonga Foundation, which empowers some of the most vulnerable and hardest-to-reach young women and girls in Benin with the knowledge and skills they need to be agents of change in their own lives and communities. Batonga accomplishes this by locating the most vulnerable adolescent girls in Benin and connecting them to girl-centred safe spaces led by Beninese women. These safe spaces provide young women and girls with training that allow them to gain new skills in financial literacy and build social capital.

She campaigned for Oxfam at the 2005 Hong Kong WTO meeting, for their Fair-Trade Campaign and travelled with them in North Kenya and at the border of Darfur and Chad with a group of women leaders in 2007 and participated in the video for the in My Name Campaign with will.i.am from the Black Eyed Peas.

She hosted the Mo Ibrahim Foundation's Prize for Achievement in African Leadership in Alexandria, Egypt, on November 26, 2007, and on November 15, 2008, in Dar es Salaam, Tanzania, on November 14, 2009, and in Mauritius on November 20, 2010. She hosted the "Africa Celebrates Democracy Concert" organized by the Mo Ibrahim Foundation in Tunis on November 11, 2011, and sang at the Award Ceremony on November 12, 2011, also in Dakar on November 10, 2012, Addis Ababa in November 2013 and Accra in November 2015.

Since March 2009, Kidjo has been campaigning for "Africa for women's rights". This campaign was launched by The International Federation of Human Rights (FIDH).

On September 28, 2009, UNICEF and Pampers launched a campaign to eradicate Tetanus "Give the Gift of Life" and asked Kidjo to produce the song "You Can Count On Me" to support the campaign. Each download of the song donates a vaccine to a mother or a mother-to-be.

With Jessica Biel and Peter Wentz, Kidjo was a LiveEarth Ambassador for the 2010 Run For Water events.

Kidjo has recorded a video based on her song "Agolo" and on the images of Yann Arthus-Bertrand for the United Nations SEAL THE DEAL Campaign to prepare for the Copenhagen Climate Change summit.

The Commission of the African Union (AU) announced on July 16, 2010, the appointment of Kidjo as one of 14 Peace Ambassadors to support the implementation of the 2010 Year of Peace and Security program.

She appears in the Sudan365: Keep the Promise video, to support the peace process in Darfur.

In June 2010, she contributed the song "Leila" to the Enough Project and Downtown Records' Raise Hope for Congo compilation. Proceeds from the compilation fund efforts to make the protection and empowerment of Congo's women a priority, as well as inspire individuals around the world to raise their voice for peace in Congo.

In 2011, Kidjo collaborated with Forró in the Dark and Brazilian Girls on the track "Aquele Abraço" for the Red Hot Organization's most recent charitable album Red Hot + Rio 2. The album is a follow-up to the 1996 Red Hot + Rio. Proceeds from the sales will be donated to raise awareness and money to fight AIDS/HIV and related health and social issues. Kidjo recorded a version of Fela Kuti's "Lady" with Questlove and Tune-Yards for the Red Hot Organization in 2012.

In September 2012, she was featured in a campaign called "30 Songs/30 Days" to support Half the Sky: Turning Oppression into Opportunity for Women Worldwide, a multi-platform media project inspired by Nicholas Kristof and Sheryl WuDunn's book.

On February 18, 2013, at the UNESCO headquarters in Paris, Kidjo was the host of a night of celebration for the cultural heritage of Mali. The event included performances by many Malian artists.

On May 22, 2014, Kidjo met with US First Lady Michelle Obama to discuss international girls' education, in the Eisenhower Executive Office Building of the White House.

On September 21, 2014, Kidjo was one of the endorsees of the People's Climate March. She joined the march in New York, along with Mary Robinson, and was interviewed by Amy Goodman for Democracy Now.

November 2014 saw Kidjo collaborating with many other artists as part of Band Aid 30, the 30th anniversary version of the 1980s supergroup.

In 2015, she signed an open letter which the ONE Campaign had been collecting signatures for; the letter was addressed to Angela Merkel and Nkosazana Dlamini-Zuma, urging them to focus on women as they serve as the head of the G7 in Germany and the AU in South Africa respectively, which will start to set the priorities in development funding before the main UN summit in September 2015 that will establish new development goals for the generation.

Kidjo is a contributor to the Art Of Saving A Life Campaign initiated by the Bill & Melinda Gates Foundation.

On September 25, 2015, she sang Afirika at the opening of the United Nations General Assembly in New York in support of the launch of the Global Goals for Sustainable Development along with Shakira after a speech by Pope Francis and before Malala.

At the G7 Summit in 2019, President Macron of France named Kidjo as the spokesperson for the AFAWA initiative (Affirmative Finance Action for Women in Africa) to help close the financing gap for women entrepreneurs in Africa.

=== Batonga Foundation ===
In 2006, Kidjo founded the Batonga Foundation with the stated goal of empowering and educating adolescent girls in sub-Saharan Africa. Kidjo invented the word "Batonga" as a child as a response to those who told her that girls did not belong in the classroom. Later, it would become the title of a hit song for her. The foundation has provided girls in five African countries (Mali, Benin, Sierra Leone, Ethiopia and Cameroon) with scholarships and in-kind support, supplied 8,727 students access to wells and latrines across seven schools in Benin, and offered 222,000 students in Benin's poorest regions Toms Shoes for the walk to school. In 2015 and 2016, Batonga began to focus on education programs aimed at excluded young women and girls, providing girls with safe spaces and mentors, equipping them with life and financial literacy skills, and helping them start small businesses.

== Special concerts ==
=== 1990s ===
In 1996, Kidjo performed in Oslo, Norway, for the Nobel Peace Prize Concert honoring Carlos Filipe Ximenes Belo and José Ramos-Horta for their work in East Timor.

In 1998, she was part of Sarah McLachlan's Lilith Fair tour.

=== 2000s ===
In 2002, she performed in Oslo for the Nobel Peace Prize Concert honoring US President Jimmy Carter.

In February 2003, she performed a cover of Jimi Hendrix's "Voodoo Child (Slight Return)" at the famed Radio City Music Hall in New York City alongside Chicago blues guitar legend Buddy Guy and New York rock guitarist Vernon Reid (of Living Colour) in what would become part of Lightning in a Bottle: One Night In The History Of The Blues, a documentary about blues music that features live concert footage of other rock, rap and blues greats.

In November 2003, she sang with Peter Gabriel and Youssou N'Dour at the Cape Town 46664 concert for the Nelson Mandela Foundation.

In May 2004, she performed at the Quincy Jones-produced concert in Rome called "We Are The Future" in front of 400,000 people. The show took place at the Circus Maximus with appearances by Oprah Winfrey, Alicia Keys, Andrea Bocelli, Herbie Hancock and other international stars.

In 2005, Kidjo appeared at the Africa Unite Live concert in Addis Ababa, Ethiopia, a concert to celebrate the Honourable Bob Marley's 60th birthday and was a featured speaker at the conference of African Unity held along with the concert.

In March 2005, she appeared at the Africa Live concert in Dakar along with many great African stars in front of 50,000 people.

In June 2005, she was part of the Live 8 concert, Eden Project hosted by Angelina Jolie in Cornwall, UK.

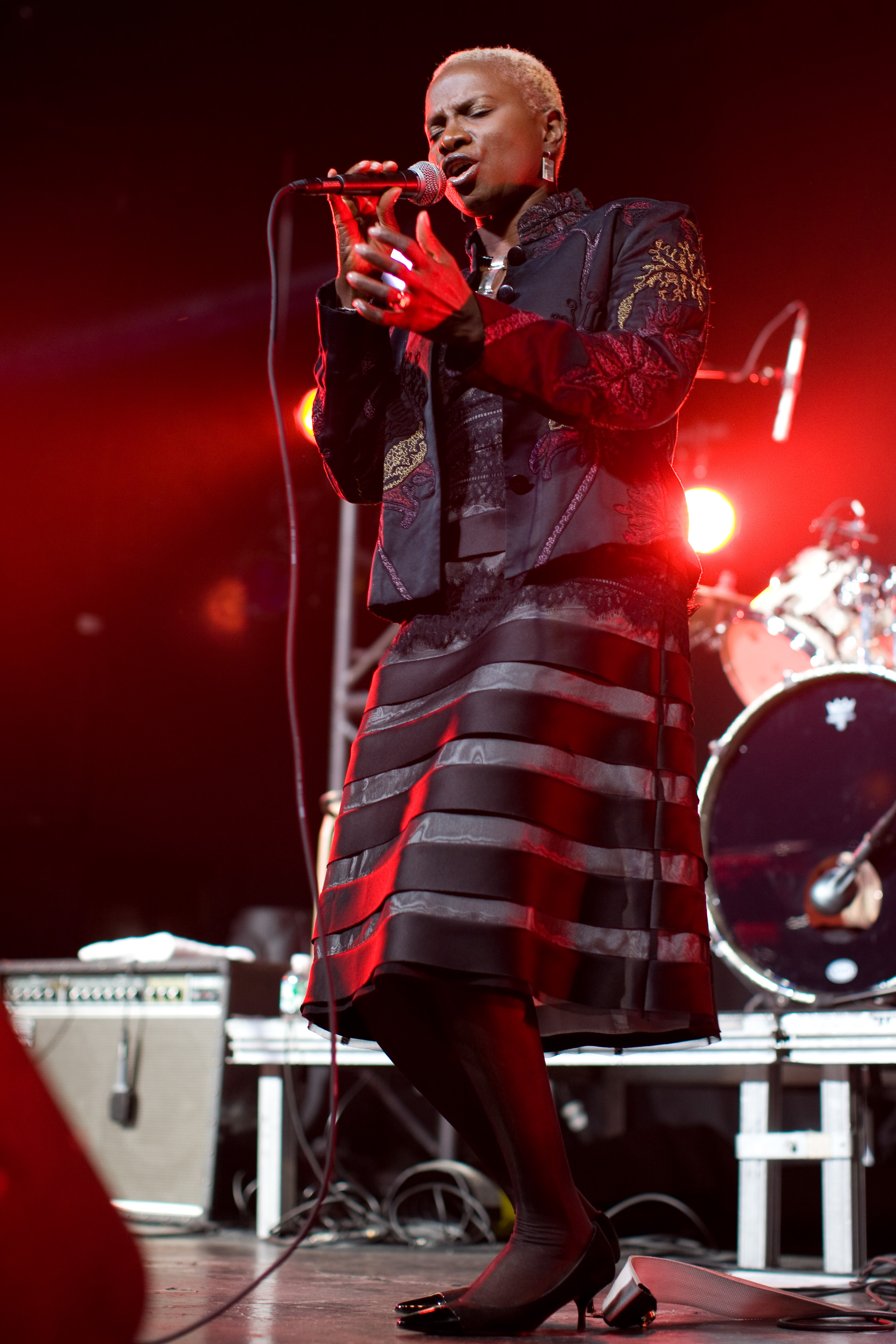
Kidjo in 2006

In 2007, she toured North America extensively with Josh Groban's "Awake" show.

On July 7, 2007, Kidjo performed at the South African leg of Live Earth.

Kidjo performed at the 75th Birthday Celebration of Quincy Jones at the Montreux Jazz Festival in July 2008.

She made her Carnegie Hall debut in New York on November 1, 2008.

Her Royal Albert Hall debut in London was on November 26, 2008, along with Hugh Masekela for the "African Stars" concert benefitting VSO.

Along with Joan Baez, Michael Franti and Jackson Browne, she performed at the Peace Ball for Barack Obama's inauguration in Washington, DC, on January 20, 2009.

Kidjo made her Sydney Opera House debut in Australia on April 12, 2009.

Kidjo appeared in the theatrical performance of Storie fantastiche dal delta del Niger by Raffaele Curi for the Alda Fendi Experimenti Foundation in Rome in April 2009.

The same month, Kidjo performed at Africa Day in The Hague, Netherlands, showing her commitment to poverty reduction and supporting the work of the Evert Vermeer Foundation and SNV Netherlands Development Organisation. Kidjo commented, "In the fight against poverty you need organisations like SNV and the Evert Vermeer Foundation. SNV with expertise on the ground and EVF convincing politicians to do more on sustainable development." In July 2009, Kidjo became a member of the SNV Netherlands Development Organisation International Advisory Board.

In Europe in July 2009, together with Dianne Reeves, Lizz Wright and Simone, Kidjo was part of a touring tribute to Nina Simone called "Sing the Truth".

The same month, she sang a duet with Alicia Keys at Radio City Hall in New York for the 46664 concerts for Nelson Mandela's Foundation.

On August 28, 29 and 30, 2009, she participated in the Back2Black Festival devoted to African culture in Rio de Janeiro along with Gilberto Gil, Youssou N'Dour and Omara Portuondo.

On September 25, 26 and 27, 2009, the Festival D'Ile De France in Paris asked Kidjo to curate a tribute to her idol Miriam Makeba at the Cirque d'hiver. She invited Rokia Traoré, Dobet Gnahoré, Sayon Bamba Camara, Vusi Mahlasela, Asa and Ayo. Kidjo curated another version of the same show at the Barbican in London on November 21, 2009, with Baaba Maal replacing Rokia Traoré.

On October 23, 2009, she sang at the United Nations General Assembly for the UN Day Concert, A Tribute to Peacekeeping with Nile Rodgers, John McLaughlin and Lang Lang.

On December 4, 2009, in Cape Town, South Africa, Kidjo performed her song "Agolo" at the Final Draw of the Fifa World Cup 2010.

On December 7, 2009, on the opening day of the UN Copenhagen Climate Change summit, Kidjo sang, along with Anggun, Shaggy, Youssou N'Dour and Cheb Khaled, at the Dance 4 Climate Change concert.

=== 2010s ===
On February 15, 2010, Kidjo performed in Vancouver for the Winter Olympic Games at the Place De La Francophonie.

On February 28, 2010, she performed at the Walt Disney Concert Hall, the Los Angeles Philharmonic concert hall designed by Frank Gehry.

On June 10, 2010, she was part of the Official Kick-Off Celebration Concert of the 2010 FIFA World Cup South Africa, along with John Legend, Hugh Masekela, Shakira, Alicia Keys, Juanes and Black Eyed Peas.

On June 17, 2010, she performed at Les FrancoFolies de Montréal – the Montreal Francofolies festival of French-language music.

On August 30, 2010, Kidjo sang at the 30th Anniversary celebration of Solidarnosc in the Polish city of Gdańsk produced by Bob Wilson and Hal Willner featuring Philip Glass, Marianne Faithfull, Rufus Wainwright and Macy Gray.

On November 11, 2010, Kidjo presented her "Sound Of The Drum" show at Carnegie Hall. The sold-out concert featured special guests Youssou N'Dour, Omara Portuondo, Dianne Reeves and guitarist Romero Lubambo and told the story of the African roots of the music of the diaspora.

From December 10 until December 19, 2010, Kidjo participated in the Fesman 2010, the World Festival of Black Arts in Dakar, Senegal. The Festival is the third edition of a festival devoted to African culture all over the world.

Kidjo was one of the performers at the BET Honours Awards in February 2011

On June 8, 2011, Kidjo performed her most famous songs with the Luxembourg Philharmonic Orchestra at the Philharmonie Luxembourg Hall.

On October 1, 2011, she created a special concert based on Beninese traditional songs with guest guitarist Lionel Loueke for the "Heroic Africans" exhibition at the Metropolitan Museum of New York.

On October 27, 2011, Kidjo performed at the Doha Tribeca Film Festival in Qatar, following the screening of Mama Africa, a documentary about Miriam Makeba's life.

On December 10, 2011, Kidjo sang "Malaika" in Oslo at the Nobel Peace Prize ceremony honoring Ellen Johnson Sirleaf, Leymah Gbowee and Tawakul Karman. Kidjo also performed at the Nobel Peace Prize Concert the next day along with Janelle Monáe, Evanescence, Sugarland, Jill Scott and many others. The event was hosted by Helen Mirren and Rosario Dawson.

On February 17, 2012, Kidjo performed for the opening of the Carnival of Recife, Brazil with Nana Vasconcelos and Maestro Forro

On February 28, 2012, the Permanent Mission of Italy to the United Nations and UNICEF presented a special Kidjo concert called "Raise your Voice to End Female Genital Mutilation" at the United Nations General Assembly Hall in New York City. The Concert was produced by MGP Live.

On April 30, 2012, Kidjo was part of the International Jazz Day organized by UNESCO at the United Nations General Assembly Hall in New York City, with Herbie Hancock, Terrence Blanchard, Ron Carter, Wayne Shorter, Tony Bennett, Shaka Khan, Stevie Wonder, Hugh Masekela and many others.

Kidjo sang "Blewu", "Redemption Song" and "Toast to Freedom" at the "Electric Burma" concert in Dublin on June 18, 2012, honoring Aung San Suu Kyi. The concert was organized by Amnesty International and also featured Bono, Damien Rice, Vanessa Redgrave and many others.

On July 21, 2012, Kidjo performed with Baaba Maal, Hugh Masekela and King Sunny Ade on the African stage of the BT River of Music Festival organized for the 2012 London Olympic Games.

On October 9, 2012, Kidjo sang for the One World Concert in Syracuse, NY, honoring the Dalai Lama. The Concert was organized by the Syracuse University and featured also Dave Matthews, Swizz Beatz, Natasha Bedingfield, David Crosby, Counting Crows, Roberta Flack, Nelly Furtado, A. R. Rahman. Phil Ramone served as a music producer and Whoopi Goldberg as MC. Kidjo sang "Move On Up" and also "True Colors" as a duet with Cyndi Lauper.

On December 6, 2012, Kidjo joined the Alicia Keys's Keep A Child Alive Black Ball in Harlem at the Apollo Theatre along with Jennifer Hudson, Bonnie Raitt and Brittany Howard. Oprah Winfrey and Kidjo were honored for their humanitarian work at the ceremony. She sang "Pata Pata", "Afirika" and "Djin Djin" as a duet with Alicia Keys.

On March 8, 2013, International Women's Day, Kidjo performed along with Fatoumata Diawara at the Royal Festival Hall in London for the Women of the World Festival organized by the Southbank Centre.

On September 13, 2013, Kidjo sang at the Rock in Rio Festival with the rock band Living Colour.

On May 14, 2014, Kidjo sang at the Brazilian music award show "Brazilian Music Awards" at the Teatro Municipal in Rio de Janeiro.

On May 29, 2014, Kidjo sang with Brazilian singer Lenine and Portuguese guitar player Rui Veloso for the opening concert of The Rolling Stones at Rock in Rio Lisboa.

On November 5, 2014, Kidjo presented her "Mama Africa" tribute concert to Miriam Makeba at Carnegie Hall. The sold-out concert featured special guests Laura Mvula, Ezra Koenig and Vusi Mahlasela and was introduced by Whoopi Goldberg.

On July 10, 2015, Kidjo sang with the San Francisco Symphony at the Louise M. Davies Symphony Hall. The program included Gershwin's "Summertime" (with lyrics in Fon), IFÉ, her collaboration with Philip Glass and some songs from her album Sings.

October 3, 2015, saw the French sold out premiere of IFÉ, Three Yoruba Songs, Kidjo's collaboration with Philip Glass at the Philharmonie de Paris with the Orchestre Lamoureux conducted by Gast Waltzing.

On November 5, 2015, the David Lynch Foundation organised another benefit concert at New York City's Carnegie Hall named "Change Begins Within" to promote transcendental meditation for stress control. Kidjo participated, as did Katy Perry, Sting, Jerry Seinfeld, Jim James and classical guitarist Sharon Isbin. Each of the performers actively practices transcendental meditation.

On July 10, 2016, Kidjo created the premiere of her "African Women All-Stars" concert at the Montreux Jazz Festival with special guests Aṣa, Dobet Gnaore, Lura and the Trio Teriba from Benin.

On September 24, 2016, Kidjo performed at the opening ceremony of the National Museum of African American Culture and History in Washington appearing along with Patti LaBelle, Angela Bassett, Robert De Niro, Will Smith, Oprah Winfrey, Barack Obama, Michelle Obama and John Lewis.

On May 5, 2017, Kidjo presented her "Remain In Light" concert at Carnegie Hall. Her sold-out performance was a reinvention of the iconic album by the rock band Talking Heads. The concert included special guest Nona Hendryx, Lionel Loueke, Antibalas, Jason Lindner and an unplanned duet with David Byrne on the song "Once In A Lifetime".

On November 11, 2018, Kidjo sang Bella Bellow's song "Blewu" under the Arc de Triomphe of Paris in front of 70 heads of state and a television audience of millions to pay tribute to the fallen African soldiers of the war.

On August 4, 2019, Kidjo appeared at the Late Night Prom of the BBC in London's Royal Albert Hall

=== 2020s ===
In 2023, Kidjo launched her 40th anniversary live concert tour commencing at the Royal Albert Hall on the 17 November 2023 and proceeding with a global tour celebrating the same. The show featured special guests, including Lebanese trumpeter Ibrahim Maalouf, Senegalese superstar Youssou N'Dour, Afropop pioneer Stonebwoy, and British singer-songwriter Laura Mvula. The full concert was recorded and released as a pay-per-view event through On Air and is available to stream in 4K UHD with Dolby Vision and Dolby Atmos sound.

Kidjo sung an Hans Zimmer's arrangement of Imagine along with John Legend, Keith Urban and Alejandro Sanz during the Tokyo 2020 Olympic Games Opening Ceremony on July 23, 2021

On September 30, 2021, Kidjo performed at the opening ceremony of Expo 2020 in Dubai, UAE.

On November 16, 2021, Kidjo performed in Geneva, Switzerland, with the Geneva Camerata in the Concert Prestige n.2 conducted by David Greilsammer, with arrangements by Jonathan Keren, and Francesco Ciniglio as the drummer.

On September 12, 2022, Kidjo performed the 1,000th Tiny Desk Concert for NPR Music.

== Personal life ==
Kidjo married French musician and producer Jean Hébrail in 1987. Their daughter Naima was born in 1993 in France.

== Other activities ==
- Kidjo performed the original song "How Can I Tell You?" in the documentary Nasrin, released in October 2020, with music by Stephen Flaherty and lyrics by Lynn Ahrens.
- In 2007, she covered John Lennon's "Happy Christmas (War Is Over)" for the CD Instant Karma: The Amnesty International Campaign to Save Darfur.
- In 2009, Kidjo released a version of "Redemption Song" on the compilation album Oh Happy Day: An All-Star Music Celebration.
- Kidjo was one of the contributors of the MOMA (Museum of Modern Art of New York) project called "Design and Violence" in 2014.
- Kidjo was a judge for the seventh annual Independent Music Awards to support independent artists' careers.

== Discography ==
=== Albums ===
Title	Year	Peak chart positions					
Title	Year	AUS	FRA	SWE	SWI	US	US World
Pretty	1981	—	—	—	—	—	—
Ewa Ka Djo (Let's Dance)	1985	—	—	—	—	—	—
Parakou	1990	—	—	—	—	—	—
Logozo	1991	39	—	—	—	—	1
Ayé	1994	54	—	20	18	—	2
Fifa	1996	86	—	36	12	—	10
Oremi	1998	64	—	—	37	—	5
Keep On Moving: The Best of Angelique Kidjo	2001	176	—	—	—	—	10
Black Ivory Soul	2002	84	102	—	52	—	2
Oyaya!	2004	—	157	—	50	—	5
Djin Djin	2007	—	141	—	62	58	1
Õÿö	2010	146	—	—	—	—	4
Spirit Rising	2012	104	—	—	—	—	5
Eve	2014	—	—	—	—	—	1
Sings (with the Orchestre Philharmonique du Luxembourg)	2015	149	—	—	—	—	6
Remain in Light	2018	—	—	—	—	—	3
Celia	2019	—	—	—	73	—	8
Mother Nature	2021	—	—	—	27	—	—
Hope	2026	—	134	—	—	—	—

=== Charted singles ===
Title	Year	Peak chart positions						Album
Title	Year	AUS	GER	NOR	SWE	UK	US Dance	Album
"Wé-Wé"	1992	95	—	—	—	—	—	Logozo
"Agolo"	1994	146	57	8	35	—	—	Ayé
"Adouma"	1994	124	—	—	—	—	—	Ayé
"Wombo Lombo"	1996	165	—	—	—	95	16	Fifa
"Shango"	1996	165	—	—	—	—	—	Fifa
"Tumba"	2002	—	—	—	—	—	26	Black Ivory Soul
"Salala" (featuring Peter Gabriel)	2007	—	—	—	—	—	17	Djin Djin

=== Featured in ===
Title	Year	Peak chart positions	Album
Title	Year	BEL (Wa)	Album
"A Child Is Born" (The Rapsody featuring Angélique Kidjo and Scorpio)	1999	Tip	Hip Hop Meets World
"Mama Africa" (Kids United with Angélique Kidjo and Youssou Ndour)	2017	Tip	Forever United

== Videography ==
Year	Title	Album	Director	Ref
1991	"Wé-Wé"	Logozo	Tom Watson	
1991	"Batonga"	Logozo	Michel Meyer	
1994	"Agolo"	Ayé	Michel Meyer	
1994	"Adouma"	Ayé	—N/a	
1996	"Wombo Lombo"	Fifa	Michel Meyer	
1996	"Shango"	Fifa	—N/a	
1998	"Voodoo Chile"	Oremi	—N/a	
1998	"We Are One"	Lion King II soundtrack	—N/a	
2007	"Gimme Shelter" (featuring Joss Stone)	Djin Djin	—N/a	
2010	"Move On Up"	Õÿö	Kevin Custer	
2012	PBS Special: Angelique Kidjo and Friends	Spirit Rising	Jim Gable	
2014	"Eva" (featuring Asa)	Eve	Kevin Custer	
2014	"Ekomole" (as featured artist of Dibi Dobo)			
2018	"Born Under Punches"	Remain In Light	Jeff Bhasker	
2018	"Once In A Lifetime"	Remain In Light	Antoine Paley	
2019	"La Vida Es Un Carnaval"	CELIA	Chris Saunders	
2021	"Dignity" (featuring Yemi Alade)	Mother Nature		
2021	"Africa, One Of A Kind"	Mother Nature		
2021	"Mother Nature"	Mother Nature		
2022	"Do Yourself" (featuring Burna Boy)	Mother Nature	Meji Alabi	
2022	"Let Me Be Great" (as featured artist of Sampa The Great)	As Above So Below		

== TV shows ==
Kidjo has appeared on several television shows, including:

- Later with Jools Holland
- NOW with Bill Moyers in 2002
- Politically Incorrect with Bill Maher in 2003
- CBS Early Show in 2007
- She was interviewed by David Frost for Al Jazeera in 2008 and Christiane Amanpour for CNN in 2009, 2012 and 2014.
- She was the host of the Tavis Smiley Show on PBS in March 2010 and February 2014 and Late Night with Jimmy Fallon in July 2010.

== Awards and recognition ==
List of Grammy Award nominations and wins
Year	Award	Category	Nominee(s)	Result	Ref.
1995	Grammy Award	Best Music Video, Short Form	"Agolo"	Nominated	
1999	Grammy Award	Best World Music Album	Oremi	Nominated	
2003	Grammy Award	Best World Music Album	Black Ivory Soul	Nominated	
2005	Grammy Award	Best Contemporary World Music Album	Oyaya!	Nominated	
2008	Grammy Award	Best Contemporary World Music Album	Djin Djin	Won	
2011	Grammy Award	Best Contemporary World Music Album	Õÿö	Nominated	
2015	Grammy Award	Best Contemporary World Music Album	Eve	Won	
2016	Grammy Award	Best Contemporary World Music Album	Sings (with Orchestre Philharmonique du Luxembourg)	Won	
2020	Grammy Award	Best World Music Album	Celia	Won	
2021	Grammy Award	Best World Music Album	Celia	Nominated	
2022	Grammy Award	Best Global Music Album	Mother Nature	Won	
2022	Grammy Award	Best Global Music Performance	"Do Yourself" (with Burna Boy)	Nominated	
2022	Grammy Award	Best Global Music Performance	"Blewu" (with Yo-Yo Ma)	Nominated	
2023	Grammy Award	Best Global Music Album	Queen of Sheba (with Ibrahim Maalouf)	Nominated	
2023	Grammy Award	Best Song Written for Visual Media	"Keep Rising" (from The Woman King; with Jessy Wilson and Jeremy Lutito)	Nominated	
2025	Grammy Award	Best Global Music Performance	"Sunlight to My Soul" (with Soweto Gospel Choir)	Nominated	
2026	Grammy Award	Best Global Music Performance	"Jerusalema"	Nominated	

=== Other competitive awards ===
Other competitive award nominations and wins
Year	Award	Category	Nominee(s)	Result	Ref.
2002	MOBO Award	Best World Music Act	—	Won	
2004	MOBO Award	Best World Music Act	—	Nominated	
2008	NAACP Image Award	Outstanding World Music Album	Djin Djin	Won	
2010	MOBO Award	Best African Act	—	Nominated	
2011	BET Award	Best International Act: Africa	—	Nominated	
2017	Africa Movie Academy Award	Best Actress in a Supporting Role	The CEO	Won	

Kidjo has received honorary doctorates from Yale University, Berklee College of Music, Middlebury College, and UCLouvain.

In 2010, the BBC Focus on Africa magazine included Kidjo in its list of the African continent's 50 most iconic figures, based on reader votes, and in 2020 she was on the list of the BBC's 100 Women.

In 2011, The Guardian listed her as one of its Top 100 Women in art, film, music and fashion and Kidjo is the first woman to be listed among "The 40 Most Powerful Celebrities in Africa" by Forbes magazine. She was listed among the "2014 Most Influential Africans" by New African magazine and Jeune Afrique. Forbes Afrique put Kidjo on the cover of their "100 most influential women" issue in 2015.

Kidjo is the recipient of the 2015 Crystal Award given by the World Economic Forum of Davos in Switzerland and she received the Ambassador of Conscience Award from Amnesty International in 2016

On September 15, 2021, Time magazine included her in their list of the 100 most influential people in the world.

On August 18, 2026, Kidjo received a star on the Hollywood Walk of Fame in Los Angeles in the category of "Recording", recognizing her contributions to the American music industry. She became the first African musician to receive the honor.

Other awards include:

- Antonio Carlos Jobim Award (2007). Created in 2004 on the 25th anniversary of the Festival International de Jazz de Montréal, the award is given to an artist "distinguished in the field of world music whose influence on the evolution of jazz and cultural crossover is widely recognized."
- Officier de l'Ordre des Arts et des Lettres (France, 2010)
- Grand Prix Des Musiques Du Monde De La Sacem for her entire songwriting career (France, 2010)
- Prix Special de la Francophonie (Washington DC, USA, 2011)
- Champions of the Earth Award (United Nations, 2011)
- BET Awards nomination for Best International Act: Africa (USA, 2011)
- Miroir Awards for World Music of the Festival d'été de Quebec (Canada, 2012)
- Trophée Des Arts, FIAF French Institute, Alliance Française (New York, 2012)
- Keep A Child Alive's Award for Outstanding Humanitarian Work, shared with Oprah Winfrey, (New York, 2012)
- Lifetime Achievement Award from the African Diaspora Awards 2012
- Songlines Music Awards in the Best Artist category (UK 2013)
- On June 4, 2014, Kidjo received the Arms Around The Child Award along with Jez Frampton during The Other Ball event in London hosted by Mark Ronson with Lily Allen, Florence and the Machine, Blood Orange and Rudimental
- On October 28, 2014, Kidjo was awarded the Chair Citation by The Dag Hammarskjöld Fund for Journalists at the United Nations in New York.
- On December 27, 2014, in Lagos, Nigeria, Kidjo won two All African Music Awards (AFRIMA): one for Best Contemporary Artist, one for Best Female Singer from West Africa.
- 2015 Crystal Award given by the World Economic Forum of Davos in Switzerland
- Visionary Leadership Award by the International Festival of Arts and Ideas in New Haven, Connecticut (January 28, 2015).
- International Mappie Award given by the M-Magasin in Stockholm, Sweden (February 9, 2015)
- David Rockefeller Bridging Leadership Award in New York by Synergos (May 6, 2015).
- Impact Award by the Population Council organization along with Elisabeth J McCormack (October 6, 2015).
- 2016 AllAfrica Leadership Award
- Ambassador of Conscience Award from Amnesty International in 2016
- Officer of the Order of Merit of the Grand Duchy of Luxembourg by Luxembourg Prime Minister Xavier Bettel (June 23, 2016).
- Best Actress in a Supporting Role from the Africa Movie Academy Awards for her role in Kunle Afolayan's movie, The CEO (July 15, 2017).
- "Grand Prix Des Musiques Du Monde" from the Académie Charles Cros for her entire career, in conjunction with the release of the French version of her memoir "La Voix Est Le Miroir De l'Âme" (November 16, 2017)
- Charles de Ferry de Fontnouvelle Award from the Lycee Francais De New York (February 24, 2018). The following month she was added to the 2018 OkayAfrica 100 Women list. The organisers cited her talent and activism in making the award.
- Prix De L'Artiste Citoyen 2018 from the Adami, the French society of performers (June 14, 2018).
- Inaugural World Pioneer Award during the Songlines magazine Music Awards 2018 ceremony at Electric Brixton in London (October 21, 2018). She sang a duet with Fatoumata Diawara backed by Mokoomba during the finale of the evening.
- German Sustainability Award along with Richard Gere and Rea Garvey (December 7, 2018). The award is endorsed by the German Federal Government, local and business associations as well as numerous NGOs, among them UNESCO and UNICEF. The German Sustainability Award was established in 2008 to encourage the acceptance of social and ecological responsibility and to identify role models in this area.
- 2019 Dutch Edison Award for her career in the Jazz and World category
- Musicultura Unimarche Prize by the Universities of Macerata and Camerino in Italy which is awarded to Italian and international personalities who have distinguished themselves in their careers for high artistic merits (June 13, 2019).
- Commandeur de l'Ordre des Arts et des Lettres (France, 2019)
- 2020 Distinguished Artist Award from the International Society for the Performing Arts.
- On November 24, 2020, Kidjo was included in the 2020 BBC 100 Women list. The list compiles "the most inspiring and influential women in the World in 2020"
- Legion of Honor (January 1, 2021) the highest French award of merit along with Roberto Alagna and Yann Arthus Bertrand
- On September 15, 2021, Time magazine included Kidjo in their Time 100 list.
- March 2022, Forbes Woman Africa Entertainer Award.
- Premio Monini during the prestigious Spoleto Festival (July 8, 2022).
- Headies Hall Of Fame (September 4, 2022).
- Path Breaker Award from the Safe Water Network (November 8, 2022).
- 2023 Vilcek Prize in Music given by the Vilcek Foundation. The Vilcek Foundation champions diversity for the advancement of the arts and sciences. We celebrate and invest in immigrant artists and scientists at every stage of their careers.
- 2023 Polar Music Prize.
- 2023 Carnegie Corporation of New York "Great Immigrants" Awards along with Alanis Morissette, Ke Huy Quan, and Pedro Pascal.
- "Prix Nuits D'Afrique Pour La Francophonie" in the City Hall of Montreal (July 13, 2023)
- "SDG Vanguard Award" from the United Nations Foundation in New York (November 21, 2024). The UN Foundation hosts its annual Global Leadership Awards to recognize extraordinary individuals and organizations whose work embodies the values and purposes of the UN – to create a safer, healthier, and fairer world for everyone, everywhere.
- Cal Performances "Award of Distinction in the Performing Arts" (August 30, 2025).

== Dance/club hits ==
Kidjo's music has been remixed by producers including Norman Cook ("We We") and Tricky ("Agolo"). Several of her singles have reached the Billboard Dance/Club Play chart. In 1996, Junior Vasquez remixes of her song "Wombo Lombo" brought the song to number 16. In 2002, King Britt remixes of her single "Tumba" helped the song reach number 26. "Agolo" was remixed by Mark Kinchen, "Shango" was remixed by Junior Vasquez, and "Conga Habanera" was remixed by Jez Colin. "Salala" from, Djin Djin, was remixed in 2007 by Junior Vasquez and Radioactive Sandwich. "Move On Up" was remixed by Radioclit, the team from the Very Best.
