= Jordan McLean (musician) =

American musical artist (born 1974)

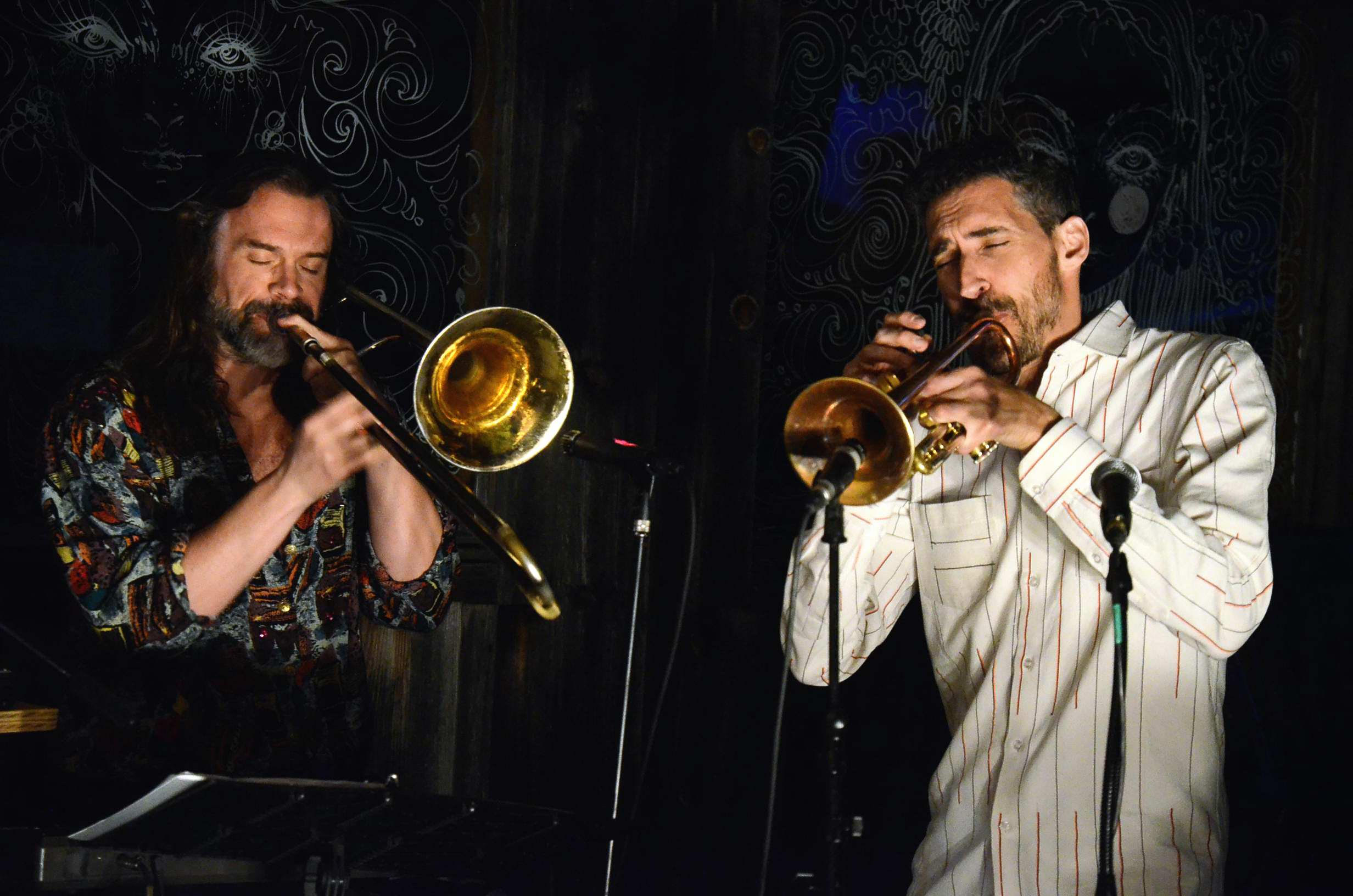
- Mclean playing trumpet (right)

Background information
- Born: April 24, 1974 (age 51); New Rochelle, New York, USA
- Occupation(s): Trumpeter, composer, producer
- Instruments: J. Landress Brass custom Bb trumpet; Del Quadro Grande Campana; Custom mouthpieces by Italian trumpet maker AR Resonance.
- Years active: 1992–present
- Labels: Daptone Records; System Dialing Records(co-founder)
- Member of: Antibalas; Armo; The Sway Machinery; The Lonesome Prairie Dogs; Hot Mustard
- Formerly of: Droid

Jordan McLean (born April 24, 1974) is a New York City-based composer, arranger, bandleader, trumpeter, producer and educator. McLean has been active in the professional music world since 1995.

== Early life and education ==
Born in New Rochelle, New York, on April 24, 1974, McLean is the only child of Alan and Cynthia McLean (computer analyst and painter/community activist respectively). He was raised in and around New York City, including Hell's Kitchen, Astoria and Mamaroneck. At the age of six, McLean began piano lessons with Michael Raskin, son of composer Gene Raskin. McLean attended high school in Leonia, NJ. While attending high school from 1988 until 1992, McLean studied trumpet, theory and band practice, and travelled to Manhattan School of Music to attend their Pre-College program.

After high school, McLean attended the Mannes College of Music from 1992 to 1995 with a focus on Jazz Trumpet Studies. In 2003, he enrolled at SUNY Purchase, where he graduated summa cum laude in Classical Composition and was an ArtsBridge America Scholar. In 2018, he returned to SUNY Purchase to complete a master's degree in studio composition, where he studied under Jakub Cuipinski and Adam Pietrykowski. His work there was recognized with the Graduate Award in Music & Technology.

== Solo career and collaborations ==
McLean has performed or recorded with Antibalas, Sharon Jones and The Dapkings, Charles Bradley, The Roots, Jamie Lidell, TV on the Radio, Ornette Coleman, David Byrne, St. Vincent, Patti Smith, Valerie June, Angelique Kidjo, Amadou and Miriam, Nicole Atkins, Patti LaBelle, Billy Gibbons, My Morning Jacket, The Alabama Shakes, Matisyahu, Santigold, Azelia Banks, The Yeah Yeah Yeahs, Cage The Elephant, Deer Tick, Tony Allen, Sinkane, Atomic Bomb, Charles Lloyd, Joshua Redman, Steven Tyler, Joe Russo's Almost Dead, Lady A, Strand Of Oaks, Thievery Corporation, Lux Prima, Amy Helm, Dr. Dog, Scott McMicken, Zach Bryan, and Shantell Martin.

McLean was the regular trumpeter for Iron & Wine in 2014, travelling throughout North America and Europe as part of the Ghost on Ghost touring band, including Matt Bauder and longtime collaborator Stuart Bogie.

McLean has recorded sessions for Bosco Mann, Mark Ronson, Wyclef Jean and Tony Visconte as well as labels such as Daptone Records, Blue Note Records, Verve, Razor and Tie, Desco, Ropeadope Records, Ninja Tune, and JDub Records.

Droid

McLean formed Droid in 1998 with drummer Amir Ziv and keyboardist Adam Butler a live experimental Drum N Bass ensemble, featuring keyboardists Adam Holzman and bassists Tim Lefavbre and Yossi Fine. Their initial release, NYC DNB was on Shadow Records and had tracks remixed by DJ Spooky.

Michael Leonhart Orchestra

As a long-time member of the Michael Leonhart Orchestra, McLean has performed with Elvis Costello, Randy Brecker, Donny MacCaslin, Ian Hendrickson-Smith, Keyon Harrold, Dave Guy, Freddy Hendrix, Frank David Greene and many others as part of the orchestra's residency at The Jazz Standard.

In 2013, McLean and drummer/performance artist John Walter Bollinger contributed to the video compilation of art pieces celebrating the 20th Anniversary of Hans Ulrich Obrist’s Do It. The digital/vinyl release became the first release on Sound Chemistry Records which later became System Dialing Records, released in 2010.

Armo

In 2016, McLean and other members of Antibalas formed Armo, a small group performing a union of Afrobeat and avant garde Jazz. The band released a self-titled 10-inch 45 rpm EP on System Dialing Records in 2018 featuring original music by McLean and singer/pianist Amayo. The original members of the band include McLean, Amayo, singer/percussionist Marcus Farrar, bassist Justin Kimmel and guitarist Nikhil P. Yerawadekar. Frequent guest collaborators include trombonist Dave “Smoota” Smith, saxophonist Cocheme’a Gastellum, drummer Greg Gonzalez and other members of the Daptone Records family of musicians.

Around the same time as the formation of Armo, McLean co-founded the band Directors. Beginning as duo with Amir Ziv, the band expanded to include Nikhil P. Yerawadekar on bass, Ricardo Quinones on guitar and Sahr N’gaujah with whom McLean shared lead vocals. The band released a 5-song EP, ACTION!, on McLean's System Dialing Records in 2020.

The Sway Machinery

Since 2003, he has performed and recorded with The Sway Machinery, with whom he has performed in clubs and synagogues around the U.S. and festivals in Europe, Canada, Mexico, Australia and Mali, including the Festival Au Desert, outside of Timbuktu. He served as music director from 2019 to 2020 for the Because Jewish High Holidays series (with Sway Machinery as the house band) at Brooklyn Bowl and The Cutting Room. McLean has performed with The Sway Machinery in clubs and synagogues around the U.S. and festivals in Europe, Canada, Mexico, Australia and Mali, including the Festival Au Desert, outside of Timbuktu.

Fire Of Space

McLean has released two albums of original music with his nine-piece group, Fire Of Space, the first produced by Binky Griptite, the second by drummer Geoff Mann. The title track of their second album "Handbasket" is featured in the film Sleepwalk with Me.

The Lonesome Prairie Dogs

As a member of The Lonesome Prairie Dogs (featuring Lenny Kaye), McLean arranged and produced the recording of the band's EP on Dala Records, recorded at Dunham Studios in Bushwick, Brooklyn. McLean's work as a recording artist includes sessions for producers such as Bosco Mann, Mark Ronson, Wyclef Jean, Joel Hamilton, Josh Kaufman and Tony Visconte as well as labels such as Warner Music, Color Red Music, Daptone Records, Blue Note Records, Verve, Razor and Tie, Desco, Ropeadope Records, Ninja Tune, and JDub Records.

McLean has played Istanbul Jazz Festival and Montreux Jazz Festival, Bonnaroo, Coachella, WOMAD and many others, and toured coast-to-coast for two consecutive years playing the Canadian Jazz Festival circuit.

Television Appearances

- The Tonight Show with Jimmy Fallon (Antibalas, Paul Simon, Rod Stewart, Steven Tyler, Jim James/Brittany Howard)
- CBS This Morning (Valerie June)
- Good Morning America (Steven Tyler)
- Conan (Iron & Wine)
- The Colbert Report (Fela! The Musical)
- The Late Show with Stephen Colbert (Zeshan B.)
- Jimmy Kimmel Live! (Antibalas, The Alabama Shakes)
- Late Night with Seth Meyers (Valerie June, The Hold Steady)
- The Late Show with David Letterman (Valerie June)

== Other notable work ==
McLean's compositions have been performed in New York and Europe by contemporary music ensembles such as Cadillac Moon Ensemble and Till By Turning. He has adapted and conducted Mauricio Kagel's Music For Renaissance Instruments and actively commissions promising young arrangers for radical re-orchestrations of masterworks. Most recently he was commissioned by The Bronxville Public Library for a dance suit Bronze In The Digital Age, a multi-media piece based on five sculptures by Pierre Rodin, and a new work, PANGRAM, for Siren Baroque chamber orchestra. Along with Herbie Hancock, he was a spokesman for The 2013 UNESCO International Jazz Day.

As a bandleader, McLean has released two albums of original music with his nine-piece group, Fire Of Space. The title track of their album “Handbasket” is featured in the film Sleepwalk with Me. The group has performed in venues throughout New York and Chicago, including as an opening act for Sharon Jones & The Dap-Kings. McLean was a musical director for a suite of High Holiday services held at New York's Brooklyn Bowl.

As an educator, McLean has been an adjunct professor of musicology at his alma mater, SUNY Purchase. He teaches composition at The New School for Jazz and Contemporary Music, where he completed jazz trumpet studies, and has worked with LEAP (Learning through an Expanded Arts Program) as a visiting artist in NYC public schools.

== System Dialing Records ==
In 2010, McLean founded System Dialing Records with drummer, Amir Ziv. Together they formed the electro-acoustic group DROID, including theBrazilian percussionist Cyro Baptista and former Miles Davis music director Adam Holzman. McLean and Ziv have also started the duo Directors, focusing on creating music for film score, albums and live performance. Since the label's creation, McLean has produced a solo album for Jeremiah Lockwood, produced and released a solo album of his own entitled World Gone Mad and most recently released the full-length studio album New Vocabulary in collaboration with Ornette Coleman and Adam Holzman.

== Discography ==
Year	Album	Artist	Credit
2023	Seconds	Hot Mustard	Composer, Trumpet
2023	Shabang	Scott McMicken and THE EVER EXPANDING	Trumpet
2022	Never Ready	Hot Mustard	Trumpet
2022	All This Time/Lonesome Nile	The Lonesome Prairie Dogs	Co-producer, Arranger, Trumpet
2022	The Prophets in the City	The Bogie Band feat. Joe Russo	Trumpet
2022	The Normyn Suites	Michael Leonhart Orchestra	Trumpet
2021	Mother Sauce	Hot Mustard	Composer, Trumpet
2021	Open Door Policy	the Hold Steady	Trumpet
2020	Large Format	Jeremy Wilms	Co-Producer
2020	Fu Chronicles	Antibalas	Trumpet
2020	Starstruck	Starstruck	Co-Producer
2019	Thrashing Thru the Passion	the Hold Steady	Trumpet
2019	Suite Extracts Vol. 1	Michael Leonhart Orchestra	Trumpet
2019	I Need A New War	Craig Finn	Trumpet
2019	Armo	Armo	Producer, Composer, Vocals, Trumpet
2019	Loopstock	Loopstock	Producer, Composer, Vocals, Trumpet
2018	Action!	Director	Co-producer, Composer, Vocals, Trumpet
2017	Undercurrent	Matisyahu	Trumpet
2016	Drum For Your Life	Pop It!	Co-producer, Composer, Arranger, Trumpet
2015	Lorenzo 2015 CC.	Jovanotti	Trumpet
2015	Purity and Danger	The Sway Machinery	Trumpet
2015	You Will Love No One But Me	The Sway Machinery	Trumpet
2014	New Vocabulary	Ornette Coleman	Trumpet, Electronics, Co-producer
2014	Lockwood	Jeremiah Lockwood	Producer
2014	Azealia Banks	Broke With Expensive Taste	Trumpet
2014	Give The People What They Want	Sharon Jones & The Dap-Kings	Trumpet
2013	A Color Map of the Sun	Pretty Lights	Trumpet
2013	B-Room	Dr. Dog	Trumpet
2012	Antibalas	Antibalas	Group Member, Trumpet, Vocals (Background)
2012	Folilla	Amadou & Mariam	Trumpet
2012	Love this Giant	David Byrne	Trumpet
2011	The House of Friendly Ghosts, Vol. 1	The Sway Machinery	Field Recording, Group Member, Trumpet
2011	The Physical EP	Superhuman Happiness	Trumpet
2010	Fela! Original Broadway Cast Album	Various Artists	Arranger, Composer, Musical Director, Trumpet
2010	Õÿö	Angélique Kidjo	Horn
2009	Fall Down Seven Times Stand Up Eight	Stuart Bogie	Trumpet
2009	Hidden Melodies Revealed	The Sway Machinery	Group Member, Trumpet
2009	Multiply/Jim	Jamie Lidell	Horn, Trumpet
2008	Snowblind	Smith, Erica	Flugelhorn, Trumpet
2008	Soul Men: Original Motion Picture Soundtrack	Various Artists	Trumpet
2008	Green Sparrow	Mike Gordon	Trumpet
2008	The Sway Machinery'	The Sway Machinery	Member of Attributed Artists, Trumpet
2007	Djin Djin	Angélique Kidjo	Horn
2007	Security	Antibalas	Composer, Flugelhorn, Trumpet
2007	60x60: 2006 & 2007		Composer
2006	American Primitive	Jeremiah Lockwood	Main Personnel, Trumpet
2006	Note Bleu: The best of the Blue Note Years 1998–2005	Medeski, Martin & Wood	Flugelhorn, Trumpet
2006	People	HiM	Flugelhorn, Member of Attributed Artist, Trumpet
2006	Zen of Logic	DJ Logic	Trumpet
2005	Batten the Hatches	Jenny Owen Youngs	Flugelhorn
2005	Multiply	Jamie Lidell	Horn, Main Personnel, Trumpet
2005	The Low Lows	Parker and Lily	Trumpet
2004	Somos Cordero	Cordero	Group Member, Trumpet
2004	Who is This America?	Antibalas	Composer, Group Member, Member of Attributed Artist, Trumpet
2003	Age of Epoch	Fire of Space	Trumpet
2003	Cool Rock	Chris Lee	Trumpet
2003	Here to There	DJ Spinna	Percussion
2002	Red Hot + Riot: The Music and Spirit of Fela Kuti		Trumpet
2002	Talkatif	Antibalas	Trumpet
2002	Uninvisible	Medeski, Martin & Wood	Flugelhorn, Trumpet
2001	In the Raw	Whitefield Brothers	Trumpet
2001	Liberation Afro Beat, Vol. 1	Antibalas	Trumpet
