= Djin Djin =

Studio album by Angélique Kidjo
- Released: April 27, 2007
- Studio: Electric Lady Studios, New York City & The Looking Glass Studios, New York City
- Genre: Afrobeat; reggae; worldbeat
- Length: 52:23
- Label: Razor & Tie
- Producer: Tony Visconti

Angélique Kidjo chronology
Oyaya! (2004)	Djin Djin (2007)	Õÿö (2010)

Professional ratings
Review scores
Source	Rating
AllMusic	3.5/5 stars
Robert Christgau	(dud)
PopMatters	8/10
USA Today	3.5/4 stars
The Washington Post	Favorable

Djin Djin is the eighth studio album by Beninese singer Angélique Kidjo. It was released on April 27, 2007, on Razor & Tie. The album won Best Contemporary World Music Album at the 2008 Grammy Awards.

== Track listing ==
All tracks composed by Angélique Kidjo and Jean Hebrail; except where indicated

No.	Title	Writer(s)	Length
1.	"Ae Ae"	Kidjo, Hebrail, Joao Mota	3:31
2.	"Djin Djin" (featuring Alicia Keys and Branford Marsalis)	Kidjo, Hebrail, Alicia Keys	4:18
3.	"Gimme Shelter" (featuring Joss Stone)	Mick Jagger, Keith Richards	4:08
4.	"Salala" (featuring Peter Gabriel)	Kidjo, Hebrail, Peter Gabriel	3:24
5.	"Senamou (C'est l'Amour)" (featuring Amadou & Mariam)	Kidjo, Hebrail, Amadou Bagayoko, Mariam Doumbia	3:44
6.	"Pearls" (featuring Carlos Santana and Josh Groban)	Andrew Hale, Sade Adu	5:05
7.	"Sedjedo" (featuring Ziggy Marley)	Kidjo, Hebrail, Ziggy Marley	3:56
8.	"Papa"		4:34
9.	"Arouna"		3:35
10.	"Awan N'la"		3:29
11.	"Emma"		3:29
12.	"Mama Golo Papa"		3:41
13.	"Lonlon (Ravel's Bolero)"	Maurice Ravel; arranged by Angélique Kidjo	4:54

European and Australian edition bonus tracks
No.	Title	Length
14.	"Arouna" (featuring Joy Denalane)	3:34
15.	"Emma" (featuring Carmen Consoli)	3:32

UK and Japanese edition bonus tracks
No.	Title	Length
14.	"Ae Ae" (Youssou N'Dour Version)
15.	"Leila"
16.	"Salala" (Junior Vasquez Afroelectro Radio Edit)

== Personnel ==
- Producer – Tony Visconti
- Drums – Poogie Bell
- Bass – Habib Faye
- Guitar – Dominic Kanza (tracks: 1, 11, 12), Lionel Loueke (tracks: 3, 5, 6)
- Guitar [African] – Joao Mota
- Guitar [Solo] – Amadou Bagayoko (tracks: 5), Keziah Jones (tracks: 4, 10)
- Acoustic Guitar – Romero Lubambo
- Steel Guitar – Larry Campbell (tracks: 9, 11, 12)
- Keyboards – Amp Fiddler, Onree Gill (tracks: 2)
- Percussion – Benoit Avihoue, Crespin Kpitiki
- Backing Vocals [South African] – Nompumelelo Skakane, Thandi Bhengu, Tsholofetso Mokubung
- Saxophone [Solo] – Branford Marsalis (tracks: 2)
- Horns – Aaron Johnson (tracks: 3, 8), Colin Stetson (tracks: 3, 8), Jordan McLean (tracks: 3, 8), Stuart Bogie (tracks: 3, 8)
- Strings – Gabriel Schaff, Gregor Kitzis, Matt Goeke, Ron Lawrence
- Engineer – Dror Mohar, Mario J. McNulty
- Mastered By – George Marino
- Mixed By – Russell Elevado (tracks: 2, 4), Tony Visconti (tracks: 1, 3, 5 )

== Charts ==
Chart (2007)	Peak position
French Albums (SNEP)	141
Italian Albums (FIMI)	56
Swiss Albums (Schweizer Hitparade)	62
US Billboard 200	58
US World Albums (Billboard)	1

== Release history ==
Region	Date	Label
Germany	April 27, 2007	Razor & Tie
United States	May 1, 2007	Razor & Tie
Canada	May 1, 2007	Razor & Tie
Australia	May 26, 2007	Razor & Tie
United Kingdom	September 24, 2007	Razor & Tie
Japan	November 21, 2007	Razor & Tie
