= New Vocabulary =

Live album by Ornette Coleman, Jordan Mclean, Amir Ziv, and Adam Holzman
- Released: 2014
- Recorded: July 18–20, 2009
- Studio: New York City
- Genre: Free jazz
- Label: System Dialing; SDR 009/NAM 010
- Producer: Jordan McLean, Amir Ziv

New Vocabulary is an album by saxophonist Ornette Coleman, trumpeter Jordan Mclean, drummer Amir Ziv, and, on three tracks, pianist Adam Holzman. It was recorded during July 18–20, 2009, in New York City, and was released in 2014 by the System Dialing label.

== Background ==
Coleman and McLean first met at a 2009 production of the musical Fela!, of which McLean was associate music director. Coleman then invited McLean to his home, where the two talked and played music together. Over the coming weeks, they invited Ziv to join them, and, according to McLean, "What started as what you might call a 'jam' turned into full-fledged rehearsals," with the proceedings recorded on Minidiscs. McLean recalled: "It was weeks, if not months, of just hanging out, socializing, jamming. It was an evolution in the way of a friendship." In 2014, the recordings were released by System Dialing Records, which had been founded by McLean and Ziv in 2010.

== Lawsuit ==
In 2015, Coleman's son Denardo, his father's legal guardian at the time, filed a lawsuit on behalf of his father against McLean and Ziv, alleging that the recordings were released without Coleman's consent or knowledge, and stating that Coleman had explicitly forbade the release. The pair defended the album, calling it "a collaborative, joint work... made with the willing involvement of each artist," and "the end result of multiple deliberate and dedicated recording sessions done with the willing participation and consent of Mr. Coleman and the other performers." On July 11, 2017, the suit was dismissed with prejudice on procedural grounds.

Pianist and composer Ethan Iverson called the lawsuit "infuriating," and commented: "Mr. Coleman had not been well for some time. Anyone who met him during his sunset years would immediately suspect that New Vocabulary is simply a case of unscrupulous representation. I personally refuse to consider New Vocabulary part of the Coleman canon any more than any other tapes of students hanging out jamming with the generous sage. Period."

== Reception ==
Professional ratings
Review scores
Source	Rating
All About Jazz	3.5/5 stars
Financial Times	4/5 stars
The Free Jazz Collective	4/5 stars

In a review for the Financial Times, Mike Hobart wrote: "The plaintive, blues-soaked cry of Ornette Coleman's alto sax leaps out of every track... The saxophonist is in superb melodic form and his distinctive phrasing lights up powerhouse grooves and fractured ballads alike."

The Boston Globe's Jon Garelick stated that the music is "often quite beautiful," and noted that Coleman's "alto proceeds in its own sweet, enchanting way, burbling delicate figures, bluesy and richly vocal — improvising on himself, as the critic Whitney Balliett once said."

Mark Corroto of All About Jazz commented: "Each track is a sort of vignette stripped to bare-bones rhythm and electronics as a petri dish for Coleman to vocalize... Not the shocking newness of Ornette's sound fifty years ago, the one that could start a fistfight. Because, well nothing is shocking any longer. But Ornette's sound. That sound remains vital and relevant to adventurous music listeners."

Writing for The Whole Note, Ken Waxman remarked: "Since Coleman's playing is oblique but decisively melodic, New Vocabulary is a disc that's convivial as well as challenging. Plus it shows that Coleman's authentic ideas can convincingly adapt to and be adopted by any number of undogmatic musicians."

In an article for Ink 19, James Mann stated that the music "shows that while Ornette Coleman might not record much anymore, when he does it is, as always, vital, fresh and in a way, shocking. Anyone interested in the limits of jazz and free expression needs to pick up New Vocabulary and be prepared to be blown away by a true American genius."

The Free Jazz Collective's Stefan Wood wrote: "any album featuring Coleman in the past decade has garnered a lot of attention, but this has slipped under the radar... Not only is it a demonstration of Coleman's brilliant skills, but an example of old and new sounds working together to create unique and challenging works of art. Recommended!"

Writer Raul Da Gama commented: "There is extremely detailed integrity in the music... Clipped phrasing and tumbling keening combine with astute voice-leading and lend interest and profile to the more narrative songs... New Vocabulary possesses an old soul and more than a touch of genius."

In an interview for NPR's Fresh Air, Kevin Whitehead remarked: "Coleman usually records with members of his own circle, in settings where he has greater control. New Vocabulary takes him into a different sonic space. It's very much a cooperative project, but McLean and Ziv are generous in setting Coleman up to do what he does best."

Preston Jones of the Fort Worth Star-Telegram described the album as "a remarkably vibrant, concise recording," and noted that the musicians "function as if they've been playing together for years."

Writing for The Denver Post, Bret Saunders stated that the album "really is a joy to hear," and commented: "I say let's celebrate the man while he can appreciate it. Still, it's odd that music from a major figure should arrive in such an under-the-radar fashion."

== Track listing ==
1. "Baby Food" – 3:25
2. "Sound Chemistry" – 4:01
3. "Alphabet" – 3:24
4. "Bleeding" – 2:12
5. "If It Takes a Hatchet" – 3:16
6. "Value and Knowledge" – 4:23
7. "Population" – 2:02
8. "Wife Life" – 1:24
9. "The Idea Has No Destiny" – 3:46
10. "H2O" – 4:16
11. "What's Hotter Than the Sun" – 3:49
12. "Gold is God's Sex" – 6:08

== Personnel ==
- Ornette Coleman – alto saxophone
- Jordan Mclean – trumpet, electronics
- Amir Ziv – drums
- Adam Holzman – piano (tracks 2, 6, and 12)
