= Fifa (Angélique Kidjo album) =

Studio album by Angélique Kidjo
- Released: March 19, 1996
- Length: 43:44
- Label: Mango
- Producer: Jean Hebrail

Angélique Kidjo chronology
Ayé (1994)	Fifa (1996)	Oremi (1998)

Singles from Album
- 1. "Wombo Lombo" Released: 1996; 2. "Shango" Released: 1996

Fifa is an album by the Beninese musician Angélique Kidjo, released in 1996. It was the first album on which Kidjo sang in English in addition to Fon and French. Fifa was considered to be an attempt at a crossover album. The first single was "Wombo Lombo".

The album peaked at No. 10 on Billboard's World Albums chart. Kidjo supported the album with a world tour.

== Production ==
The album was produced by Kidjo's husband, Jean Hebrail; much of it was recorded in the couple's Paris home studio. Hundreds of musicians played on the album, including Carlos Santana and villagers and farmers encountered by Kidjo while she traveled throughout Benin.

Kidjo wrote the songs by focusing on the rhythm first. "Naïma" is named for Kidjo's daughter. "Bitchifi" was influenced by reggae music. Other songs use elements of zouk and township jive.

== Critical reception ==
Professional ratings
Review scores
Source	Rating
AllMusic	3/5 stars
Robert Christgau	(dud)
Daily Breeze	3/4 stars
The Encyclopedia of Popular Music	3/5 stars
Knoxville News Sentinel	3/5 stars
MusicHound World: The Essential Album Guide	4/5 stars
Philadelphia Daily News	5/5 stars
The Tampa Tribune	2.5/4 stars

The Province wrote that "bluesy electric guitar is played to contrast lighter African styles while the drums incorporate both traditional and popular western rhythms." The Toronto Star determined that "the songs seamlessly fuse traditional African rhythms with contemporary gospel singing, Afro-pop melodies and a dash of rap." The Baltimore Sun called Fifa "true fusion, music that may owe a debt to other styles but which functions on its own terms."

The Record stated: "Instead of mixing Western and African influences together in a blend that is neither one nor the other, Kidjo uses the influences as distinct building blocks to create a sonic structure that is remarkably coherent." The Gazette deemed the album "sassy, polished, global pop." The New York Times concluded that, "with funk, hip-hop, gospel and pop rubbing up against African rhythms, chants and melodies, it is her slickest crossover album yet."

AllMusic noted that "Kidjo's instincts for pairing African rhythms and Western structures are inspired." The Waterloo Region Record listed the album as the sixth best of 1996. Nashville Scene considered it among the 20 best albums of the year.

== Track listing ==
Fifa track listing
No.	Title	Length
1.	"The Sound of the Drums"	4:58
2.	"Wombo Lombo"	4:15
3.	"Welcome"	4:26
4.	"Shango"	4:53
5.	"Bitchifi"	4:27
6.	"Fifa"	3:57
7.	"Goddess of the Sea"	4:11
8.	"Akwaba"	4:24
9.	"Koro-Koro"	3:41
10.	"Naïma"	4:32
Total length:		43:44

== Charts ==
Chart performance for Fifa
Chart (1996)	Peak position
Australian Albums (ARIA)	86
Swedish Albums (Sverigetopplistan)	36
Swiss Albums (Schweizer Hitparade)	12
US World Albums (Billboard)	10
