= Zilin Music =

Zilin music, also known as Zilin, Zinli, and Zilyn, is a style of Music from Benin played with percussive instruments called kpezin, and is usually meant for funerals. Researchers have expressed that there is little written on much of Benin's music (including Zilin) in comparison to other African countries.

== History ==
Zinli was created in the 17th century by King Glele in Abomey as part of his father's friend's funeral. This royal association gives Zinli a respected reputation up to the present day, and is still performed at funerals. Some have expressed the opinion that Zinli in the current day is performed less because people take too much inspiration from Western music and dance sensibilities, and are trying to follow what globalization has brought them.

== Characteristics ==
Zinli involves prominent polyrhythms.

=== Instruments ===
- Kpezinga and Kpezinvi: two drums, with one being bigger than the other. Played with the hands
- Zin: a pot used as an instrument
- Gan daho: a bell that plays the same note
- Gan kwe kwe: a bell that is the main focus musically
- Assan: a basket rattle

== Notable artists ==
- Angélique Kidjo uses the Zilin vocal technique in her music.
- Alèkpéhanhou, a musician from Benin, is known for popularizing Zinli in the 1980s.
