= Sayon Camara =

Guinean singer

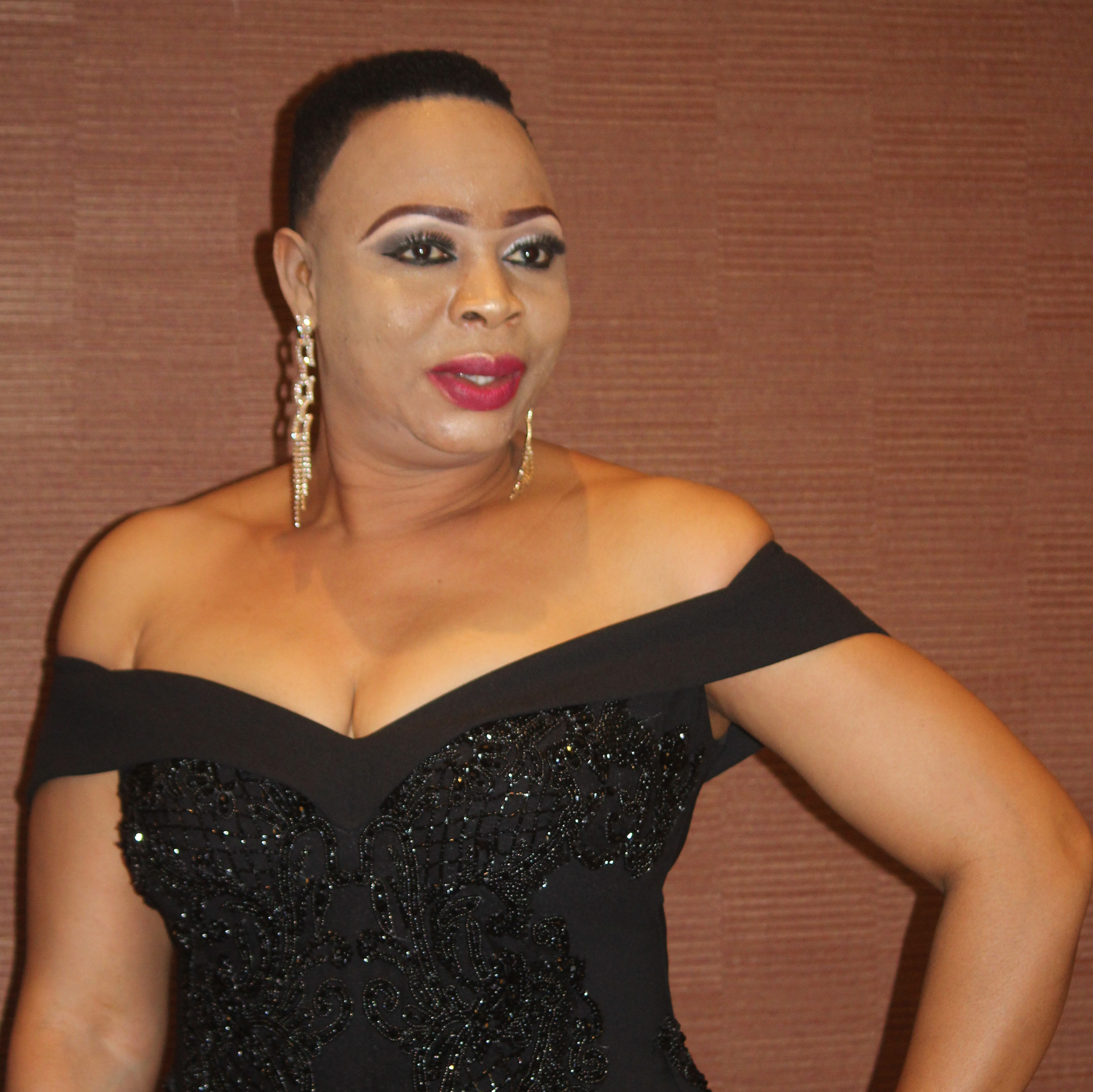
- Born: Faranah
- Other names: Taramakhè
- Occupation: singer
- Known for: Singing and UNESCO Artist for Peace
- Spouse: Mamadou Cissoko

Sayon Camara or Taramakhè is a Guinean singer. She was chosen in 2003 as the first African UNESCO Artist for Peace.

== Life ==
Camara was born in Faranah.

Her Malinke music is said to be "in line with the Mandingo art of the great griots". She and other musicians (including her husband) recorded her first album in Cote D'Ivoire at a studio in Abidjan. The 1998 album, Dinguiraye, established her reputation in Guinea and she earned the nickname "Taramakhè (town agitator)" because of her extravagant concerts. The following year she sang at UNESCO headquarters as part of the Félix Houphouët-Boigny Peace Prize ceremony when the Community of Sant'Egidio were awarded the prize.

In 2002 her second album, "Saramaya" was again recorded in Abidjan and she also returned to UNESCO headquarters and the Félix Houphouët-Boigny Peace Prize ceremony when President of East Timor Xanana Gusmão was awarded the prize. At the party to celebrate her album Saramaya she was given two cars and a house by her fans.

She was chosen as a UNESCO Artist for Peace in 2003. She was the first African to be given this role.
