= Fu Chronicles =

Studio album by Antibalas
- Released: February 7, 2020
- Length: 48:37
- Label: Daptone

Antibalas chronology
| Where the Gods Are in Peace (2017) | Fu Chronicles (2020) |

Professional ratings
Aggregate scores
| Source | Rating |
|---|---|
| Metacritic | 80/100 |
Review scores
| Source | Rating |
| AllMusic | 3.5/5 stars |
| Cult MTL | 8/10 |

Fu Chronicles is the seventh studio album by American band Antibalas. Written and conceptualized by lead singer Duke Amayo. Arranged and co-produced by Antibalas founder Martin Perna and bassist/founding member Gabriel Roth, the album was recorded at the Daptone House of Soul in Bushwick, Brooklyn, the summer of 2018 and later released on February 7, 2020 on Daptone.

In support of the album, the band announced a tour which was cut short by the pandemic. The final show of the tour was at the Summit Music Hall in Denver, Colorado. During the pandemic shutdown in 2021 Amayo and the band announced their formal separation.

== Critical reception ==
Fu Chronicles was met with generally favorable reviews from critics. At Metacritic, which assigns a weighted average rating out of 100 to reviews from mainstream publications, this release received an average score of 80, based on 4 reviews. It was nominated for the Grammy Award for Best Global Music Album.

== Track listing ==
Fu Chronicles track listing
| No. | Title | Length |
|---|---|---|
| 1. | "Amenawon" | 8:17 |
| 2. | "Lai Lai" | 8:51 |
| 3. | "MTTT, Pt. 1-2" | 7:19 |
| 4. | "Fight Am Finish" | 6:30 |
| 5. | "Koto" | 9:58 |
| 6. | "Fist of Flowers" | 7:42 |
