= Antibalas =

American afrobeat band

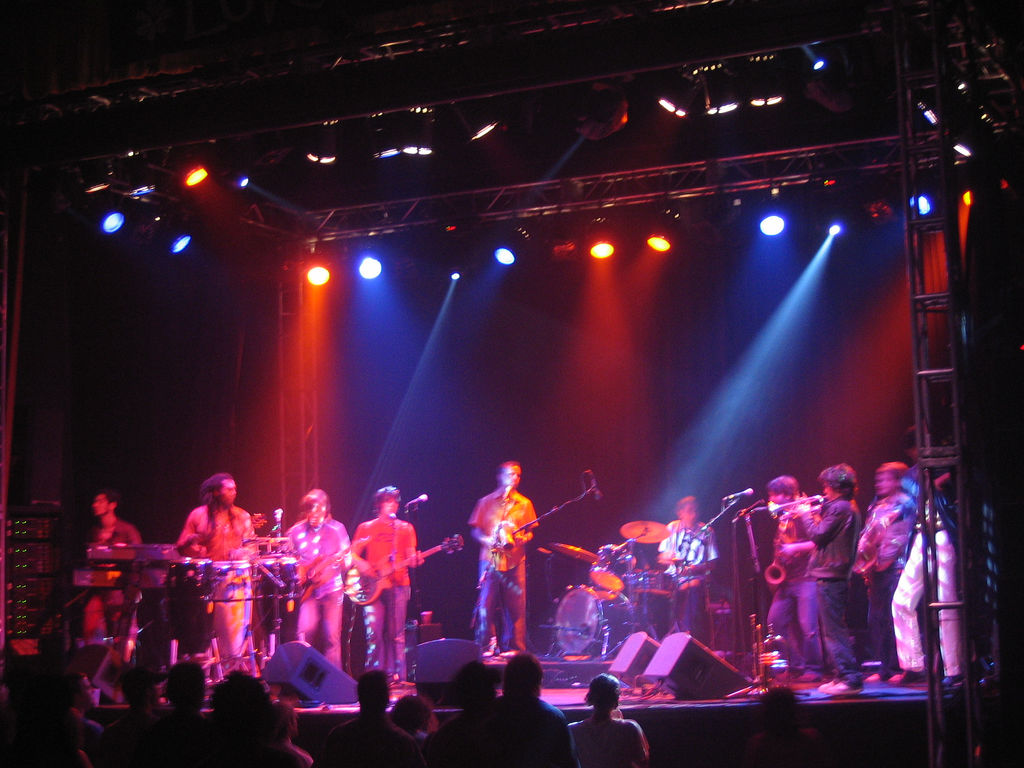
- At the Granada Theater in Dallas, TX on May 19, 2005.

Background information
- Also known as: Antibalas Afrobeat Orchestra
- Origin: United States
- Genres: Afrobeat, funk, jazz
- Years active: 1998–present
- Labels: Ninja Tune, ANTI-, Ropeadope Records, Exactamundo, Daptone, Fania, Verve
- Members: Martín Perna; Marcos García; Jordan McLean; Marcus Farrar; Reinaldo Dejesus; Jake Pinto; Justin Kimmel; Timothy J Allen; Kevin Raczka; Michael Pallas; Drew Vandewinckel; Andrew McGovern
- Past members: see below
- Website: antibalas.com

Antibalas (Spanish for "bulletproof") is an American, Brooklyn-based afrobeat band founded in 1998 by Martín Perna. Initially inspired by Fela Kuti's Africa 70 band and Eddie Palmieri's Harlem River Drive Orchestra, the music generally follows the musical architecture and language of afrobeat and incorporates elements of jazz, funk, dub, improvised music, and traditional drumming from Cuba and West Africa.

== History ==
As "Conjunto Antibalas", the group first performed on May 26, 1998, at St. Nick's Pub in Harlem at a poetry night organized by visual artist Xaviera Simmons. Over the next few months, the group solidified with a core of eleven band members and expanded their repertoire of original songs. For the first year of the group's existence, they performed exclusively at non-commercial venues such as block parties, lofts, and public parks, before securing a Friday-night residency at the now-defunct NoMoore in August 1999. Called Africalia!, the residency lasted from August 1999 till April 2001, when the club was shut down by fire officials during the Giuliani administration's crackdown on nightclubs and cabarets. Along with Perna, guitarist and producer/engineer Gabriel Roth wrote several of the earlier tunes and oversaw recording and most of the production of the first three records.

Over the next few years, the band's presence grew and lead singer Duke Amayo joined the band in 1999; by summer 2000 Antibalas had released their first album, Liberation Afrobeat Vol. 1, and had toured twice in England, while continuing to play at venues throughout New York City. Recording with the group in the early days was Cameroonian drummer Jojo Kuo, who can be heard on the studio recordings of "Uprising" and "Machete".

By early 2002, the horn-driven outfit had released their second album, Talkatif, and continued to tour throughout the United States and Europe. In summer 2004, they released their third studio album, Who is This America? on Ropeadope Records. Of the album, Pitchfork writes, "Indeed, where Antibalas' previous works were abridged for accessibility, here they've clearly become more comfortable with their staying power, and more confident with their voice."

The group returned to the studio in the summer of 2005 to work with producer John McEntire in Chicago. Antibalas's album Security, produced by McEntire and released on the ANTI- label in 2007, was "a clear turning point for the band," and Spin notes "they've practically become their own genre."

Antibalas has performed in 35 countries, including Japan and Australia, and throughout New York City, from Carnegie Hall to Central Park Summerstage to the Rikers Island prison facility.

The group has received guest visits from several musicians from Fela Kuti's Afrika 70 and Egypt 80 bands, including Tony Allen (drums), Femi Kuti (alto sax), Tunde Williams (trumpet), Oghene Kologbo (guitar), Nicolas Addey (congas), Dele Sosimi (keyboards), Ola Jagun (drums/percussion), and Jojo Kuo (drums) as well as Seun Kuti.

In the summer of 2008, Antibalas was featured off-Broadway in Bill T. Jones's Fela!, a musical celebrating the life of Fela Kuti. Antibalas trombonist Aaron Johnson served as the show's musical director and was joined by several members of Antibalas. In the fall of 2009, Fela! opened on Broadway at the Eugene O'Neill Theatre, once again with members of Antibalas.

In 2010, the band independently released their Rat Race EP, produced by Victor Axelrod, with original "Se Chifló" featuring Chico Mann as vocalist and an arrangement of Bob Marley's "Rat Race" sung by Amayo on vocals. "Rat Race" was included on the compilation World's Funkiest Covers in 2011.

In 2011, the band reunited with producer and former Antibalas guitarist Gabriel Roth at Daptone Studios in Bushwick, Brooklyn, to record their fifth full-length album, entitled Antibalas. The album was released on August 7, 2012, on the Daptone label.

The band resumed a heavy touring schedule beginning in April 2012 with their debut tour in Brazil, performing in São Paulo and Recife, and kicked off a US tour at the Outsidelands Festival in San Francisco, followed by a tour of California. On August 24, 2012, Antibalas made their national television debut, performing their single "Dirty Money" on NBC's Late Night with Jimmy Fallon. On September 11, they resumed their US/Canada tour with 30 dates in the Midwest, East Coast, Southeast and Gulf Coast, including the Austin City Limits Festival. On October 4, they appeared on NPR's Tiny Desk Concerts. The band toured in Europe in October and November 2012, followed by an Australian tour in March 2013 . In May of the same year Antibalas visited Mexico for first time, performing in Puebla "Festival 5 de Mayo" joined by original member Victor Axelrod on bass.

In 2014, the group, along with Daptone label mates Sharon Jones & the Dap-Kings, Charles Bradley, The Sugarman Three, and Saun & Starr performed as the Daptone Super Soul Revue, performing 13 dates in Europe in July and later four nights at the Apollo Theater with additional Daptone artists.

In 2015, the Antibalas horn section collaborated with The Dap-Kings horn section, Mark Ronson, and Bruno Mars to record "Uptown Funk" and other tracks from Ronson's 2015 album Uptown Special. They also performed "Uptown Funk" together on Saturday Night Live in November 2014.

The group also performed a 29-show tour in collaboration with the group Zap Mama at performing arts centers across the US and Canada.

In 2020, Antibalas released their seventh full-length studio album, entitled Fu Chronicles, on the Daptone label. Composed by longtime vocalist Amayo who told NPR's Morning Edition, "Since I was a kid, I was always studying martial arts and kung fu was very central [to] everything I did. So when I started playing music, I couldn't imagine not having kung fu as part of that training. But then, I wanted to now figure out a way to bring it all together. So this album was the first chapter in [which] kung fu meets Afrobeat."

The band's worldwide tour in support of Fu Chronicles began in early 2020. but was interrupted and cancelled because of the COVID-19 pandemic shutdowns. Fu Chronicles was nominated in the category of Best Global Music Album for the 63rd Annual Grammy Awards.

In mid-2021 the band began a formal separation process with Amayo, which was publicly announced in November 2021 once settled.

Immediately following Amayo's departure, the band resumed touring throughout North America, Mexico, Europe and North Africa, and in May 2023 completed a four-night, eight-show run at the Blue Note Jazz Club in New York, celebrating their 25th anniversary.

== Band members ==
Current

- Martin Perna – (founder) baritone saxophone, flute (1998–present)
- Jordan McLean – trumpet, flugelhorn (1998–present)
- Marcos J. Garcia – guitar, vocals (2003–present)
- Marcus Farrar – shekere, vocals (2005–present)
- Reinaldo de Jesus – congas (2010–present)
- Timothy Allen - guitar (2010–present)
- Kevin Raczka – drums (2015–present)
- Justin Kimmel – guitar, Bass (2019–present)
- Andrew McGovern – trumpet (2021–present)
- Drew Vandenwinckel – saxophone (2021–present)
- Michael Pallas – trombone (2022–present)
- Eric Biondo – trumpet (2003–present)

Former

- Gabriel Roth (aka Bosco Mann) – guitar (1999–2005)
- Duke Amayo – lead vocals, congas, percussion, composer (1999–2021)
- Luke O'Malley – guitar (1999–2018)
- Victor Axelrod – organ, electric pianos, clavinet, electric celeste, synthesizers, percussion (1999–2012)
- Dylan Fusillo – percussion, drums (1999–2009)
- Fernando Velez – congas (1999–2006)
- Raymond James Mason – trombone (2013–2021)
- Will Rast – organ, electric pianos, synthesizers (2013–2018)
- Phillip Ballman – drums, first band manager (1998–2004)
- Morgan Price – tenor Saxophone (2016–2019)
- Jackie Coleman – trumpet (2019–2021)
- Phillipe Lehman – drums (1998–1999)

Former

- Michael Herbst – tenor saxophone, alto saxophone (1999–2003)
- Mike Wagner – trombone (1999–2003)
- Giancarlo Luiggi – shekere (1999–2003)
- Amadou Diallo – guitar, bass (1999–2001)
- Aaron Johnson – trombone (2000–2018)
- Del Stribling aka Binky Griptite – bass (2000–2005)
- Stuart D. Bogie – tenor saxophone, alto saxophone (2001–2018)
- Ernesto Abreu – congas (2001–2003)
- Todd Simon – trumpet (2001–2003)
- Anda Szilagyi – trumpet (2001–2003)
- Nick Movshon – bass (2003–2010)
- Geoff Mann – shekere (2003–2005)
- Chris Vatalaro – drums (2006–2010)
- Miles Arntzen – drums (2010–2018)
- Nikhil P. Yerawadekar – bass guitar, guitar (2010–2018)
- Yoshi Takamasa – percussion (2010–2013)
- Cochemea Gastelum – tenor saxophone, alto saxophone (2010–2013)
- Dave Guy – trumpet (2010–2013)
- Jeff Pierce – trombone, trumpet (2013–2018)
- Jas Walton – tenor saxophone (2015–2018)
- Joseph Woullard – tenor saxophone (2015–2018)
- Doug Berns – bass (2015–2018)
- Raja Kassis – guitar (2015–2019)

== Discography ==
Albums

- Liberation Afrobeat Vol. 1 (2000, Afrosound, reissued by Ninja Tune in 2001)
- Talkatif (2002, Ninja Tune)
- Who is This America? (2004, Ropeadope Records / Daptone)
- Security (2007, ANTI-; Daptone)
- Antibalas (2012, Daptone)
- Where the Gods Are in Peace (2017, Daptone)
- Fu Chronicles (2020, Daptone)
- Hourglass (2025, Daptone)

EPs and singles

- Uprising (1999, Afrosound) 7"
- N.E.S.T.A. (2000, Afrosound) 12"
- Tour EP (2002, Afrosound) EP
- Che Che Colé (2003, Daptone) 12"
- Government Magic (2005, Afrosound) EP
- K-Leg/R.O.C. (2006, Purpose) 12"
- Family Affair/Mr President (2006, Mind Records and Service) Split 7" by Antibalas/Psycho
- Rat Race/Se Chifló 12" (2010, Exactamundo Records)
- Tattletale 7" (2014, Daptone Records)
- Fight Am Finish (2019, Daptone Records)

Albums featured

- Uninvisible by Medeski Martin & Wood (2002, Blue Note)
- Desperate Youth, Bloodthirsty Babes by TV on the Radio (2004, Touch and Go / 4AD)
- Zen of Logic by DJ Logic (2006, Ropeadope Records)
- Return to Cookie Mountain by TV on the Radio (2006, 4AD/Interscope)
- Antidotes by Foals (2008, Transgressive/Sub Pop)
- Dear Science, by TV on the Radio (2008, 4AD/Interscope)
- Love This Giant by David Byrne and St. Vincent (4AD)
- Flux Remixed by Anomie Belle (Diving Bell)

Compilations featured

- Afrobeat . . . NO GO DIE (2000, Shanachie Records)
- Africafunk Vol. 2 (2000, Harmless Records)
- Ouelele (2002 & 2006, Comet Records)
- Red Hot & Riot (2002, MCA)
- Afrobeat (2002, Blow Records)
- Turntables on the Hudson Vol. 2 (2002, Musicrama)
- African Xpress (2003, Narada Records)
- Turntables on the Hudson Vol. 4 (2003, Caroline)
- Rewind 3 (2003, Ubiquity Records)
- “Badassss” Soundtrack (2004, Bbe Records)
- Afrobeat Sessions (2004, Sessions)
- Genocide in Sudan (2004, Reincarnate)
- ASAP – Afrobeat Sudan Aid Project (2004, Modiba Productions)
- Essential Afrobeat (2005, UMVD Import)
- Impeach the Precedent (2005, Kicksnare Hat / Kajmere Sound)
- Gilles Peterson in Africa (2005, Ether Records)
- Let Rhythm Provide: An Emergency Compilation for Our Brothers and Sisters in New Orleans (2005, Ocote Soul Media)
- Snowboy Presents the return of the Hi-Hat (2001, Ocho Records)
- Daptone Gold (2009, Daptone Records)

Television appearances

- Late Night with Jimmy Fallon NBC Television. August 24, 2012.

Films featured

- Doin' It in the Park (2012, Bobbito Garcia and Kevin Couliau)
