= List of awards and nominations received by Lupe Fiasco =

List of Lupe Fiasco's awards
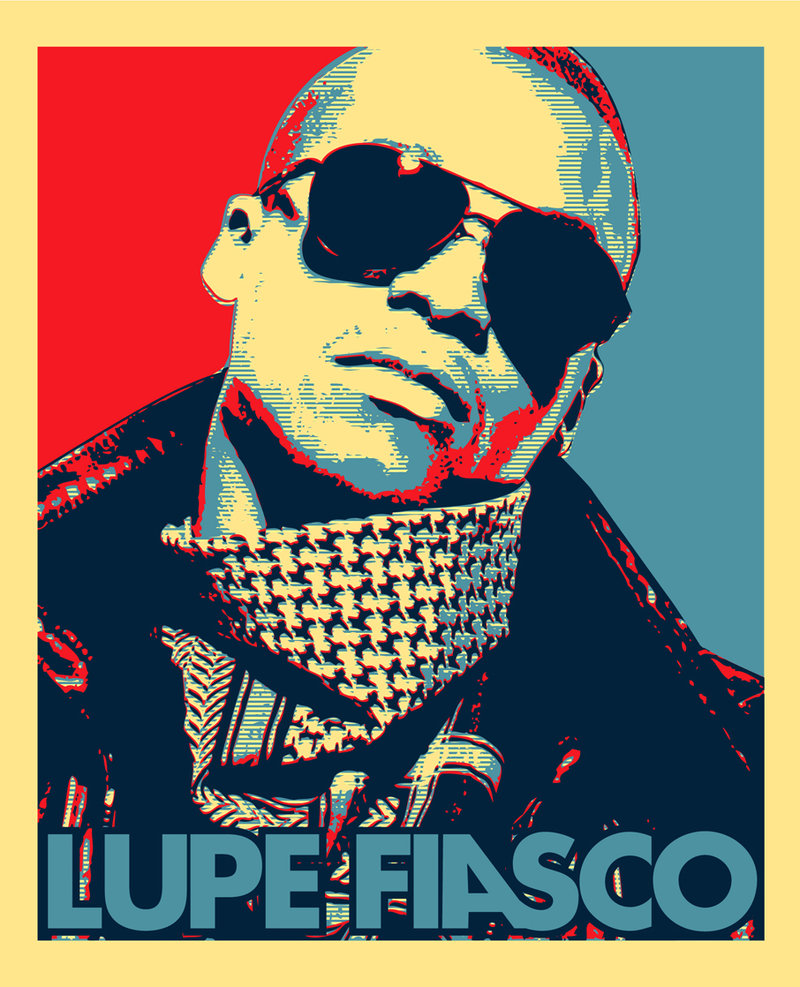
Award	Wins	Nominations
AOL Music Award	1	1
BET Awards	0	1
BET Hip Hop Awards	0	6
Grammy Awards	1	12
MOBO Awards	0	1
MTV Video Music Awards	0	2
MTV2 Awards	1	1
NAACP Image Awards	0	1
Soul Train Music Awards	0	1
Teen Choice Awards	0	3
Urban Music Awards	0	1
USA's Character Approved Award	1	1
- Totals
Awards won	4
Nominations	31

This is a comprehensive list of awards and nominations won by Lupe Fiasco, an American hip-hop artist. In total, he has been nominated for thirty-three awards. He has won one Grammy and has been nominated for eleven others. He has also won a USA's Character Approved Award, which had started that year.

== AOL Music Award ==
Year	Nominee / work	Award	Result
2006	Himself	Breaker Artist	Won

== BET Hip-Hop Awards ==
Year	Nominee / work	Award	Result
2006	Lupe Fiasco's Food & Liquor	Hip-Hop CD of the Year	Nominated
2006	"Kick, Push"	Hip-Hop Video of the Year	Nominated
2006	"Kick, Push"	Rookie of the Year	Nominated
2006	Himself	Lyricist of the Year	Nominated
2007	Lupe Fiasco's The Cool	CD of the Year	Nominated
2007	"Superstar"(with Matthew Santos)	Alltel Wireless People’s Champ	Nominated
2008	Lupe Fiasco's The Cool	CD of the Year	Nominated
2008	"Superstar" (with Matthew Santos)	Alltel Wireless People's Champ	Nominated
2011	Lasers	CD of the Year	Nominated
2011	"Out of My Head" featuring Trey Songz	Reese’s Perfect Combo Award	Nominated
2012	"Around My Way (Freedom Ain't Free)"	Impact Track	Nominated
2012	"Bitch Bad"	Impact Track	Nominated

== BET Awards ==
Year	Nominee / work	Award	Result
2007	Himself	Best New Artist	Nominated

== Grammy Awards ==
Year	Nominee / work	Award	Result
2007	"Kick, Push"	Best Rap Solo Performance	Nominated
2007	"Kick, Push"	Best Rap Song	Nominated
2007	Lupe Fiasco's Food & Liquor	Best Rap Album	Nominated
2008	"Daydreamin'" (with Jill Scott)	Best Urban/Alternative Performance	Won
2009	"Paris, Tokyo"	Best Rap Solo Performance	Nominated
2009	Lupe Fiasco's The Cool	Best Rap Album	Nominated
2009	"Superstar" (with Matthew Santos)	Best Rap/Sung Collaboration	Nominated
2009	"Superstar" (with Matthew Santos)	Best Rap Song	Nominated
2012	"The Show Goes On"	Best Rap Song	Nominated
2012	"The Show Goes On"	Best Rap Performance	Nominated
2012	Lasers	Best Rap Album	Nominated
2013	Food & Liquor II: The Great American Rap Album Pt. 1	Best Rap Album	Nominated

== MOBO Awards ==
Year	Nominee / work	Award	Result
2008	Himself	Best Hip-Hop Act	Nominated

== MTV Video Music Awards ==
Year	Nominee / work	Award	Result
2008	"Superstar"	Best Hip-Hop Video	Nominated
2011	"The Show Goes On"	Best Hip-Hop Video	Nominated

== MTV2 Awards ==
Year	Nominee / work	Award	Result
2006	Himself	Freshest MC Award	Won

== NAACP Image Awards ==
Year	Nominee / work	Award	Result
2007	Himself	Outstanding New Artist	Nominated

== Soul Train Music Awards ==
Year	Nominee / work	Award	Result
2007	"I Gotcha"	Best New R&B/Soul or Rap New Artist	Nominated

== Teen Choice Awards ==
Year	Nominee / work	Award	Result
2008	"Superstar"(with Matthew Santos)	Best Hip-Hop song	Nominated
2008	Himself	Rap Artist	Nominated
2011	Himself	R&B/Hip-Hop Artist	Nominated

== Urban Music Awards ==
Year	Nominee / work	Award	Result
2009	Himself	Urban Music Award for Best Hip-Hop Act	Nominated

== USA's Character Approved Awards ==
Year	Nominee / work	Award	Result
2009	Himself	Character Approved Award for Musician	Won
