= Soundtrakk =

American record producer

- Born: Rudolph Loyola Lopez; February 27, 1981 (age 44)
- Origin: Chicago, Illinois, U.S.
- Genres: Hip hop
- Occupations: Producer; songwriter
- Years active: 2001–present
- Labels: 1st & 15th

Rudolph Loyola Lopez (born February 27, 1981), known professionally as Soundtrakk, is an American Grammy-nominated record producer from Chicago, Illinois. He is best known as the longtime in-house producer for American rapper Lupe Fiasco, having produced singles such as "Kick, Push," "Superstar," "Hip-Hop Saved My Life," and "Dumb It Down". He fully produced two of Fiasco's albums, Drill Music in Zion (2022) and Samurai (2024). Soundtrakk has also worked with artists including Mez, CyHi the Prynce, Stalley, and Logic.

== Personal life ==
Soundtrakk is Filipino. During the COVID-19 pandemic, he nearly died.

== Discography ==
=== EPs ===
List of EPs, with year released
Title	EP details
Tape Tape (with Lupe Fiasco)	Released: October 2, 2020; Label: 1st & 15th, Thirty Tigers; Format: DL, streaming

=== Production discography ===
List of songs, showing year released, artist name, and name of the album
Year	Artist(s)	Song	Album
2006	Lupe Fiasco	03. "Mean & Vicious"	Fahrenheit 1/15 Part II: Revenge of the Nerds
2006	Lupe Fiasco	"The Commercial"	None
2006	Lupe Fiasco (featuring Sarah Green)	02. "Real"	Lupe Fiasco's Food & Liquor
2006	Lupe Fiasco	04. "Kick, Push"	Lupe Fiasco's Food & Liquor
2006	Lupe Fiasco (featuring Gemini and Sarah Green)	07. "He Say She Say"	Lupe Fiasco's Food & Liquor
2006	Lupe Fiasco	08. "Sunshine"	Lupe Fiasco's Food & Liquor
2006	Lupe Fiasco	14. "The Emperor's Soundtrack"	Lupe Fiasco's Food & Liquor
2007	Lupe Fiasco (featuring Sarah Green and GemStones)	02. "Free Chilly (Interlude)"	Lupe Fiasco's The Cool
2007	Lupe Fiasco	03. "Go Go Gadget Flow"	Lupe Fiasco's The Cool
2007	Lupe Fiasco (featuring Matthew Santos)	05. "Superstar"	Lupe Fiasco's The Cool
2007	Lupe Fiasco	06. "Paris, Tokyo"	Lupe Fiasco's The Cool
2007	Lupe Fiasco (featuring Nikki Jean)	09. "Hip-Hop Saved My Life"	Lupe Fiasco's The Cool
2007	Lupe Fiasco (featuring Sarah Green)	10. "Intruder Alert"	Lupe Fiasco's The Cool
2007	Lupe Fiasco	13. "Gotta Eat"	Lupe Fiasco's The Cool
2007	Lupe Fiasco (featuring GemStones and Graham Burris)	14. "Dumb It Down"	Lupe Fiasco's The Cool
2007	Lupe Fiasco (featuring GemStones)	16. "The Die"	Lupe Fiasco's The Cool
2007	Lupe Fiasco (featuring GemStones)	19. "Go Baby"	Lupe Fiasco's The Cool
2008	Lupe Fiasco	03. "Fah Real"	Chill's Spotlight, Vol. 2
2009	Lupe Fiasco	05. "Lasers Manifesto (Interlude)"	Enemy of the State: A Love Story
2010	GemStones	05. "All I Dream Of"	On the Road to Glory My Story
2011	Lupe Fiasco (featuring Matthew Santos)	14. "Shining Down"	Lasers
2011	Lupe Fiasco	09. "SLR (Super Lupe Rap)"	Friend of the People: I Fight Evil
2012	Lupe Fiasco	02. "Strange Fruition"	Food & Liquor II: The Great American Rap Album Pt. 1
2013	Lupe Fiasco	"SLR 3 (Round of Applause)"	None
2013	Stalley featuring Omarion and Rockie Fresh	18. "Paris"	Self Made Vol. 3
2017	Lupe Fiasco	01. "Dopamine Lit (Intro)"	Drogas Light
2017	Lupe Fiasco	03. "Promise"	Drogas Light
2017	Lupe Fiasco (featuring Gizzle)	05. "Jump"	Drogas Light
2017	Lupe Fiasco	"Running from President"	None
2018	Lupe Fiasco	"Pearl Harbor"	None
2018	Lupe Fiasco	02. "Drogas"	Drogas Wave
2018	Lupe Fiasco	06. "WAV Files"	Drogas Wave
2018	Lupe Fiasco (featuring Nikki Jean)	07. "Down"	Drogas Wave
2018	Lupe Fiasco (featuring Nikki Jean)	08. "Haile Selassie"	Drogas Wave
2018	Lupe Fiasco (featuring Nikki Jean)	11. "Stronger"	Drogas Wave
2018	Lupe Fiasco	15. "Jonylah Forever"	Drogas Wave
2018	Lupe Fiasco (featuring Elena Pinderhughes)	20. "Cripple"	Drogas Wave
2018	Lupe Fiasco	21. "King Nas"	Drogas Wave
2020	Lupe Fiasco	"BBQ Chicken Thighs"	None
2021	Lupe Fiasco	"Steve Jobs: SLR 3 1/2"	None
2022	Lupe Fiasco (Ayesha Jaco)	01. "The Lion's Deen"	Drill Music in Zion
2022	Lupe Fiasco	02. "Ghoti"	Drill Music in Zion
2022	Lupe Fiasco (featuring Nayirah)	03. "Autoboto"	Drill Music in Zion
2022	Lupe Fiasco (featuring Nayirah)	04. "Precious Things"	Drill Music in Zion
2022	Lupe Fiasco	05. "Kiosk"	Drill Music in Zion
2022	Lupe Fiasco	06. "Ms. Mural"	Drill Music in Zion
2022	Lupe Fiasco	07. "Naomi"	Drill Music in Zion
2022	Lupe Fiasco	08. "Drill Music in Zion"	Drill Music in Zion
2022	Lupe Fiasco (featuring Nayirah)	09. "Seattle"	Drill Music in Zion
2022	Lupe Fiasco	10. "On Faux Nem"	Drill Music in Zion
2023	Logic	10. "Shimmy"	College Park
2024	Lupe Fiasco	01. "Samurai"	Samurai
2024	Lupe Fiasco	02. "Mumble Rap"	Samurai
2024	Lupe Fiasco	03. "Cake"	Samurai
2024	Lupe Fiasco	04. "Palaces"	Samurai
2024	Lupe Fiasco	05. "No. 1 Headband"	Samurai
2024	Lupe Fiasco	06. "Bigfoot"	Samurai
2024	Lupe Fiasco	07. "Outside"	Samurai
2024	Lupe Fiasco	08. "Til Eternity"	Samurai
2024	Lupe Fiasco	"Pound for Pound"	None

== Awards and nominations ==
Year	Organization	Category	Work	Result	Ref.
2009	Grammy Awards	Best Rap Song	"Superstar"	Nominated	
