= Needlz =

American record producer

- Born: Khari Cain; April 19, 1978 (age 48); Lansing, Michigan, U.S.
- Genres: Hip hop
- Occupations: Record producer; songwriter
- Years active: 2001–present
- Label: Dry Rain Entertainment

Khari Cain (born April 19, 1978), known professionally as Needlz, is an American record producer and songwriter.

== Early life and career ==
Cain was born on April 19, 1978, in Lansing, Michigan. He began to DJ while an undergraduate in Florida Agricultural and Mechanical University and Florida State University. He majored in the graduate music business program at New York University's Steinhardt School and originally intended to pursue a career in artist and repertoire (A&R). After attaining an internship with Bad Boy Records, he was inspired to begin a career in record production. With the help of A&R Folayan Knight, Needlz associated with Black Entertainment Television (BET) and MTV and created theme songs for Rap City and Suckafree Sundays, respectively. Fellow record producer Swizz Beatz assisted Needlz to "exposure" by collaborating in album production, including Cassidy's I'm a Hustla and Swizz Beatz One Man Band Man.

== Production style ==
Needlz chiefly produces songs in the hip hop genre. He describes his style as "an oxymoron: clean and dirty at the same time". He uses Akai MPC2000XL and Pro Tools to produce beats and utilizes Kurzweil K2661 and the Roland MKS-80 for synthesizers. He has endorsed the Native Instruments Maschine.

== Production discography ==
Year	Title	Artist	Album
2001	"We Don't Give a Fuck" "Gonna Be Sumthin'"	Ruff Ryders	Ryde or Die Vol. 3: In the "R" We Trust
2002	"Miss You"	Afu-Ra	Life Force Radio
2003	"Gangsta Shit"	G-Unit	Beg for Mercy
2003	"Keep It Hot"	Mic Geronimo	Long Road Back
2003	"Think Y'all Know"	Fabolous	More Street Dreams, Pt. 2: The Mixtape
2003	"Good God Almighty"	Nappy Roots	Wooden Leather
2004	"Put Your Drinks Down"	Drag-On	Hell and Back
2004	"Pass Out"	Ludacris	The Red Light District
2004	"Mein Song"	Max Herre	Max Herre
2004	"Bang Bang" "Let Me In"	Young Buck	Straight Outta Cashville
2005	"No Need for Conversation"	Fabolous	Coach Carter soundtrack
2005	"Beauty Queen"	Czar*Nok	Coach Carter soundtrack
2005	"Special"	The Game	The Documentary
2005	"Piggy Bank" "God Gave Me Style"	50 Cent	The Massacre
2005	"Crack"	Cassidy	I'm a Hustla
2005	"Throw It Back"	Trina	Glamorest Life
2005	"No No No"	Kool Savas & Azad	One
2005	"Drugs, Basket Ball, & Rap"	Talib Kweli	Right About Now: The Official Sucka Free Mix CD
2005	"Put Ya Hands Up"	Norfclk	Ludacris Presents: Disturbing tha Peace
2005	"Stopp die Party" "Zähl mein Geld"	Afrob	Hammer
2006	"The Pen and the Needlz"	Lupe Fiasco	Fahrenheit 1/15, Part I (The Truth Is Among Us) (Mixtape)
2006	"Tilted"	Lupe Fiasco	Kick Push CD Single
2006	"Hurt Me Soul"	Lupe Fiasco	Lupe Fiasco's Food & Liquor
2006	"Floating"	Megan Rochell	You, Me and the Radio (Unreleased)
2006	"Serius" "Life in the City" "Ride Out"	Serius Jones	King Me (Mixtape)
2006	"Grind Mode"	Serius Jones	Non-Album Track
2006	"Get Clapped"	Lloyd Banks	Rotten Apple
2006	"Here We Go Again" "Shake the Room"	Jaley	Jaley
2006	"Born and Raised"	Dave Chappelle	Dave Chappelle's Block Party soundtrack
2006	"Hey Babe (Give Me Ya Lovin')"	Shareefa	Point of No Return
2006	"Grind Boy"	Smitty	The Voice of the Ghetto
2006	"Turnt Out"	Diego Redd	Gettin Money. Gettin Paid. a Hustler's Story (Mixtape)
2006	"Raised in the Mitten"	P.L.	Without Warning Vol.2 (Mixtape)
2007	"Get Away"	Ria	"R. Kive" 1996–2006
2007	"Gangsta (Interlude)"	Rich Boy	Rich Boy
2007	"Bust Ya Gunz"	Swizz Beatz	One Man Band Man
2007	"Slow Down"	Tage	The Jerk Vol 0 (Mixtape)
2007	"Nuttin' on Me"	Freeway	Free at Last
2007	"My Life"	Joe Budden	Mood Muzik 3.5
2009	"Diesel"	Freeway	Month of Madness (Mixtape)
2009	"One 4 the Treble" "Get Dirty"	Ralph Dogg	Reckless
2009	"How You Like Me Now" "What Money Sounds Like" "Gangsta Shit (Evasocold Mix)" "Tear It Up"	Archie Eversole	Back Like I Never Left (Mixtape)
2009	"We Miss You"	Busta Rhymes	Back on My B.S.
2009	"Intro"	Serius Jones	Why So Serius (Mixtape)
2009	"The Necessary Evils"	Skyzoo	The Salvation
2009	"Walk These Streets"	Rakim	The Seventh Seal
2009	"Help! (I Been Robbed)"	Serius Jones	Life Is Serius (TBR)
2009	"Letter to B.I.G."	Jadakiss	The Last Kiss
2009	"I'm Goin' In"	Drake	So Far Gone
2009	"Hands 2 Myself"	Russell Taylor	Confessional
2009	"Gone"	Donnis	10.Deep Presents: Diary of an ATL Brave
2009	"Baggage Claim"	88-Keys	non-album track
2010	"One 4 the Treble" "Get Dirty"	Ralph Dog	Reckless
2010	"Dome Shotz"	Minacci featuring Young Buck	5 Mics
2010	"Maybe Baby"	Donnis	The Invitation (Mixtape)
2010	"OD"	Donnis	Fashionably Late (Sampler)
2010	"Greatest Trapper Alive"	Young Jeezy	Trap or Die 2: By All Means Necessary
2010	"Yup" "Eat You Alive" "Lighting" (co-produced) "For The Kill" (co-produced)	Donnis	Fashionably Late (Mixtape)
2010	"The Overdose" "On Da Korner"	Pill	1140: The Overdose (Mixtape)
2010	"The Beginning" (co-producer)	Stat Quo	Statlanta
2010	"Just The Way You Are" (keyboard and drum programming, strings by Needlz)	Bruno Mars	Doo-Wops & Hooligans
2010	"She & H.E.R.", "Suicide ediciuS", "Stars" (co-produced)	John Regan	Sorry I'm Late
2010	"Reflections"	Pill	The Medicine
2010	"Right To Say"	Emilio Rojas	Life Without Shame (Mixtape)
2011	"Till I Get There"	Lupe Fiasco	Lasers
2011	"Oh No"	Big Perm	Reign Delay (Mixtape)
2012	"It's All On Me"	Pill	The Epidemic
2013	"YOLO"	The Lonely Island	The Wack Album
2015	"Oui" (keyboard programming)	Jeremih	Late Nights
2016	"Selfish (PnB Rock song)" (keyboard and drum programming, bass by Needlz)	PnB Rock	GTTM: Going Thru the Motions
2017	"Jussa Lil Bih"	Musiq Soulchild	Feel the Real
2018	"Ring" (featuring Kehlani)	Cardi B	Invasion of Privacy
2018	"You"	Nicole Bus	TBA
