= Prolyfic =

- Prolyfic in 2010

Background information
- Also known as: Prolyfic, Pro
- Born: David Lemar Ewing Jr. April 2, 1981 (age 45)
- Origin: Chicago, Illinois, U.S.
- Genres: Hip hop; R&B; Pop
- Occupations: Record producer; Songwriter
- Instruments: synthesizer; keyboards; drums; sampler
- Years active: 1996–present

David Lemar Ewing Jr. (born April 2, 1981), known professionally as Prolyfic, is an American Grammy-nominated hip-hop record producer, and songwriter best known for his work with hip hop artist Lupe Fiasco.

== Early life ==
David Lemar Ewing Jr. was born in Chicago, Illinois the son of Anita Logan and David Lemar Ewing Sr. As a teenager, Ewing became interested in hip hop, performing amateur raps at age fourteen under the name Prolyfic. Although a student at Simeon Career Academy on the southside, he frequently participated in freestyle battles at local parties across town, he made way to gain the approval of hip hop underground audiences, alongside fellow members of his Inner Circle/I.C.U squad.

As Ewing's reputation grew, more popular crew's sought out to acquire him as a member. In 1997 he joined the group ILL Nature, and merged a union between the groups he had already led, and the new group he was a part of, to create the "360 Click", a crew that consisted of Inner Circle, I.C.U., & ILL Nature. They then went on to win several local, as well as All City Rap Battles, including Ewing winning 2 himself, and placing runner up in his very first attendance against local legend Profound.

As Ewing started to mature, his focus leaned more in the favor of hip hop production, purchasing his first MPC2000XL by the age of 18. Fellow Chicago producer Boogz heard his material and, taken by Ewing's unique sense of sample selection, began working with him, as well as introducing him to the circle of chi-town producers Ewing would later become a part of. Including No I.D., Kanye West, Brian "Allday" Miller, & few others. Prolyfic recalls: "I started working on my craft and getting better and better and there was this cat named Boogz, who I hooked up with at the time. We used to always hang out at the Point over on 55th and Lake Shore – that was Hip Hop land..... Boogz looked at me as a smaller version of himself.... He saw that I had a good ear for samples, but he knew I needed help on certain things. He showed me how to chop the samples up.... The way Dion "(No I.D.)" and Kanye do it. He showed me that style of chopping. He introduced me to people like Icedrake, Kanye West, No I.D. and Dug Infinite. So Boogz is really the person who is responsible for bringing me into the circle."

== Career ==
In 2000, Prolyfic inked his first deal with local production company "Infared Music Group", alongside fellow producer Boogz, and other hip hop acts such as Yung Berg, & L.e.p. His first production placement was on Dame Dash Presents: Paid In Full/Dream Team Soundtrack with Oschino & Sparks on the song entitled "On and Poppin". After a brief stint at Infared, Prolyfic then became an in-house producer for Lupe Fiasco's 1st & 15th production company, but left shortly after the release of Fiasco's Grammy Award Winning debut album, Lupe Fiasco's Food & Liquor.

Citing "No I.D." as his mentor, teacher, & friend, Prolyfic learns by watching and studying under the legendary Chicago producer's wing. He is currently executive producing the release of Detroit-Chicago based recording artist Drey Skonie's debut EP entitled "One Night Stand" slated to be released March 2014.

== Discography ==
Year	Artist	Album	Song	Role	Notes
2002	Oschino & Sparks	Roc-A-Fella Records Presents Paid in Full	On & Poppin'	Producer	Produced with Boogz
2003	Foxy Brown (rapper)	Brooklyn's Don Diva	Why	Producer	Not Credited
2004	Lupe Fiasco	Fahrenheit 1/15 Part I: The Truth Is Among Us	Knockin' at the Door	Producer	
2004	Lupe Fiasco	Fahrenheit 1/15 Part I: The Truth Is Among Us	Boss Playa	Producer, Vocals	Feat. Gemini & Prolyfic
2004	Lupe Fiasco		I Know Why	Producer	Feat. Gemini
2004	Lupe Fiasco		U Don't Know	Producer	
2005	Lupe Fiasco	Fahrenheit 1/15 Part II: Revenge of the Nerd	Mean & Vicious	Producer	
2005	Lupe Fiasco	Fahrenheit 1/15 Part II: Revenge of the Nerd	Freestyle	Producer	Feat. Gemini
2006	Lupe Fiasco	Food & Liquor Advance	Dedicated	Producer	Feat. Gemini
2006	Lupe Fiasco	Food & Liquor Advance	Pimp Hand (Make Sure)	Producer	
2006	Lupe Fiasco	Food & Liquor Advance	Theme Music to a Drive By (intro)	Producer	
2006	Lupe Fiasco	Food & Liquor Advance	Real Recognize Real	Producer	
2006	Lupe Fiasco	Food & Liquor Advance	Trials & Tribulations	Producer	
2006	Lupe Fiasco	MTV Presents: My Block Chicago Soundtrack	Pills	Producer	
2006	Gemini	MTV Presents: My Block Chicago Soundtrack	Candy	Producer	
2006	Lupe Fiasco	Food & Liquor Retail	Just Might Be Okay	Producer	Feat. Gemini
2006	Lupe Fiasco	Food & Liquor Retail	Pressure	Producer	Feat. Jay-Z & Gemini
2006	Lupe Fiasco	Food & Liquor Retail	American Terrorist	Producer	Feat. Matthew Santos
2006	Lupe Fiasco	Food & Liquor Retail	Carrera Lu	Producer, Vocals	Feat. Prolyfic
2008	Gemini		Time	Producer	
2008	Gemini		G-4	Producer	
2008	Add-2	Tale Of Two's City Vol. 3: The Rise & Fall	Pride	Producer	
2010	Drake		You Know, You Know	Producer	Produced with Kanye West & No I.D.
2010	Mikkey Halsted	The Dark Room	First Class	Producer, Vocals	
2010	Mikkey Halsted	The Dark Room	Frozen	Producer, writer	Feat. Kamilah Summer
2010	Jazmine Sullivan	Love Me Back	Famous	Producer	Produced with No I.D.
2010	MC Lyte		My Story	Producer	Feat. Anthony Hamilton
2010	MC Lyte		What We Been Thru	Producer	
2012	Scotty ATL	The Jiffy Cornbread Experience	Too Cool	Producer	Produced with Soundtrakk
2012	Scotty ATL	The Jiffy Cornbread Experience	Pay Day	Producer	Produced with 1120
2012	Scotty ATL	The Jiffy Cornbread Experience	Cornbread Eatin'	Producer	Produced with The 2-3
2012	Scotty ATL	The Jiffy Cornbread Experience	No Sticks, No Seeds	Producer	
2012	King Mez	My Everlasting Zeal	Tonight	Mixer	Feat. Drey Skonie
2012	King Mez	My Everlasting Zeal	Play Skool (Shape, Number, Color)	Writer, Vocals	Performed Hook
2012	King Mez	My Everlasting Zeal	The Diadem	Producer	Feat. Drey Skonie Produced with Face of The 2-3
2012	Yung Berg	Chicago Redemption	Know Me	Producer	
2012	Jeremih	Late Nights	Skit Intro/Jeremih	Producer	
2012	Jeremih	Late Nights	All Over Me	Producer	Feat. Sir Michael Rock of The Cool Kids
2012	BJ the Chicago Kid	Pineapple Now-Laters	Sex Is The Best Breakfast	Producer	
2014	Scotty ATL		Bad Boy '97	Producer	Feat. Rich The Kid
2014	Drey Skonie	One Night Stand	One Night Only	Writer	
2014	Drey Skonie	One Night Stand	My Lady/Think About it	Producer	Produced with No Speakers
2014	Drey Skonie	One Night Stand	Busy Makin' Luv	Producer	Produced with Drey Skonie & iRock
2014	Drey Skonie	One Night Stand	The W	Producer	
2014	Drey Skonie	One Night Stand	Luv Me Best	Writer, producer	Produced with Drey Skonie
2014	Drey Skonie	One Night Stand	One Night Stand	Producer	Produced with iRock & Drey Skonie
2015	Goody	Shawty Swing	21 (ToAnyOne)	Producer	

== Grammy Awards ==
Year	Nominee / work	Award	Result
2007	Lupe Fiasco's Food & Liquor	Best Rap Album	Nominated

== BET Hip-Hop Awards ==
Year	Nominee / work	Award	Result
2006	Lupe Fiasco's Food & Liquor	Hip-Hop CD of the Year	Nominated

== Executive produced/A&R ==
Year	Artist	Project	Role
2012	Scotty ATL	The Jiffy Cornbread Experience	Executive Producer, Sequencer & Arranger
2013	Giftz	Position of Power	A&R, Sequencer
2014	Drey Skonie	One Night Stand	Executive Producer, Sequencer & Arranger
