= Japanese cartoon =

Japanese cartoon may refer to:

- Manga, Japanese comics
- Anime, Japanese animated media
- Japanese Cartoon (band), an American rock band
