= Drill Music in Zion =

Studio album by Lupe Fiasco
- Released: June 24, 2022
- Recorded: August 9–12, 2021
- Genres: Conscious hip-hop; jazz rap
- Length: 40:57
- Labels: 1st & 15th; Thirty Tigers
- Producers: Lupe Fiasco; Soundtrakk

Lupe Fiasco chronology
House (2020)	Drill Music in Zion (2022)	Samurai (2024)

Singles from Drill Music in Zion
- 1. "Autoboto" Released: May 19, 2022; 2. "Drill Music in Zion" Released: June 16, 2022

Drill Music in Zion (stylized in all caps) is the eighth studio album by American hip-hop recording artist Lupe Fiasco, released on June 24, 2022, through 1st & 15th and Thirty Tigers. The album was preceded by two singles, "Autoboto" and "Drill Music in Zion".

== Background ==
Lupe Fiasco recorded Drill Music in Zion in August 2021. He intended to record the entire album in 24 hours, but the process ended up taking three days. Lupe's decision to record the album over such a short timespan was inspired by the Japanese concept of wabi-sabi, or appreciating the beauty in imperfection. In a tweet on August 12, 2021, Lupe Fiasco described the album as "my Illmatic". He also stated that the full album would be produced by Soundtrakk, whose past collaborations with Lupe include "Kick, Push" and "Superstar".

In an interview with Okayplayer, Lupe has stated that – despite the title – Drill Music in Zion is "not meant to be a 'drill music' album. In some cases, it's not even an album about drill music." He went on to state that the album title was inspired by a scene in The Matrix Reloaded in which "robots drill down into Zion. The last place where humanity can live and survive in the Matrix world, they call it Zion". Lupe has also stated that his goal with the album was "to find a balance between the whimsy and the profound".

== Lyrics and themes ==
A HipHopDX review identified the album's principal theme as "the grim, almost macabre state of hip hop". The review goes on to identify that theme as appearing most strongly on "On Faux Nem," where Lupe "longs for the culturally destructive bars he hears ... to be lies rather than rooted in real-world beef", and on "Ms. Mural", where Lupe "describes the current state of 'art' and ethical dilemmas he faces" as an artist. The album has also been perceived as critical of capitalism, with the track "Drill Music in Zion" discussing how "mass consumerism power[s] the greed of the few" and "Kiosk" criticizing the market for diamonds.

The opening track of Drill Music in Zion, "The Lion's Deen", is a spoken word monologue by Lupe's sister, Ayesha Jaco. In that track, she introduces the themes of the record by discussing "the different facets of what drill music is[,] the different types of drilling, the different types of what 'Zion' means".

== Critical reception ==
Professional ratings
Aggregate scores
Source	Rating
Metacritic	79/100
Review scores
Source	Rating
AllMusic	4.5/5 stars
Clash	7/10
HipHopDX	4.1/5
The Observer	3/5 stars
Pitchfork	6.8/10
Sputnikmusic	3.9/5

Drill Music in Zion received generally favorable reviews from critics. At Metacritic, which assigns a normalized rating out of 100 to reviews from mainstream publications, the album received an average score of 79, based on 8 reviews.

A review from Clash characterized the album as "deliver[ing] an emotionally controlled, thought-provoking display of virtuosic lyricism" that "merges the modern with the classic". HipHopDX describes Lupe as sounding "like a wise sage, reporting from an elevated vantage point ... without brooding in old-head energy". A staff review on Sputnikmusic describes the album as sounding "unhurried and easy". Soundtrakk's production on the album has been described as "lush [and] jazz-centric", leading the album to be characterized as jazz rap.

Critics also observed the short runtime of Drill Music in Zion compared to Lupe's previous albums. HipHopDX remarked that the album contained "no filler or fluff", while a review by The Observer describes the album as "blessedly short". Reviewing the album for AllMusic, David Crone also commented on the album's runtime, noting that "at a much more succinct 40 minutes, Drill Music in Zion lacks the scope of its predecessors – yet refuses to budge on their depth." He concluded that, "On DMIZ the rapper finds a third gem in the post-T&Y crown, writing with his incisive pen into smaller frameworks with stunning consequences." Writing for Pitchfork, Peter Berry compared the album less favorably to the rest of Lupe Fiasco's oeuvre, stating: "There isn't the futuristic psychedelia of 'Just Might Be OK' or the euphoric escapism of 'Kick, Push' here, so no one song matches the widespread appeal of Lupe's best work."

== Track listing ==
All tracks written by Wasalu Jaco, except "The Lion's Deen" written by Ayesha Jaco. All tracks produced by Lupe Fiasco and Soundtrakk.

Drill Music in Zion track listing
No.	Title	Length
1.	"The Lion's Deen" (featuring Ayesha Jaco)	2:36
2.	"Ghoti"	1:52
3.	"Autoboto" (featuring Nayirah)	4:31
4.	"Precious Things" (featuring Nayirah)	4:21
5.	"Kiosk"	3:43
6.	"Ms. Mural"	5:33
7.	"Naomi"	2:48
8.	"Drill Music in Zion"	4:32
9.	"Seattle" (featuring Nayirah)	5:17
10.	"On Faux Nem"	5:39
Total length:		40:57

== Charts ==
Chart performance for Drill Music in Zion
Chart (2022)	Peak position
UK R&B Albums (Official Charts)	26
