= Japanese Cartoon (band) =

American post-punk revival band

- Origin: U.S.
- Genres: Post-punk revival; alternative rock; indie rock; electronic rock
- Years active: 2008–present
- Labels: All Sabotage; 1st & 15th
- Members: Wasalu Muhammad Jaco (vocals); Graham Burris (bass); Matt Nelson (keyboard); Le Messie (production)
- Website: allsabotage.com

Japanese Cartoon is an American rock band that was formed in 2008 by rapper Wasalu Muhammad Jaco, otherwise known by his stage name Lupe Fiasco. The band consists of Jaco (Vocals) who can be heard singing in a Mockney accent for some songs, Graham Burris (Bass), Matt Nelson (Keyboard), and Le Messie (Production). Their album In the Jaws of the Lords of Death was released July 16, 2010 as a free online download from their website.

== History ==
Wasalu Jaco (Lupe Fiasco) and Le Messie have been collaborating since 2004. Other musicians who collaborated on the album include Chris Gelbuda (Matthew Santos Band), Jonathan Marks (Hey Champ), Robert Tucker (Matthew Santos Band), Wolfie, Ian Astbury, Erik Hammer, and Bam Alexander.

== In the Jaws of the Lords of Death ==
No.	Title	Length
1.	"JAWS"	2:49
2.	"All Sabotage!!! (STSO)"	2:21
3.	"Heirplanes"	4:08
4.	"Beijing"	3:27
5.	"Crowd Participation"	3:27
6.	"Firing Squad"	3:58
7.	"You Are Here"	3:26
8.	"ARMY"	2:51
9.	"Gasp"	4:30

== Discography ==
Studio albums

- 2010: "In the Jaws of the Lords of Death"

Singles

- 2009: "ARMY"
- 2010: "Heirplanes"
