= Samurai (Lupe Fiasco album) =

Studio album by Lupe Fiasco
- Released: June 28, 2024
- Genres: Hip-hop; jazz rap
- Length: 30:53
- Labels: 1st & 15th; Thirty Tigers
- Producers: Charles "Chilly" Patton (exec.); Lupe Fiasco (exec.); Soundtrakk

Lupe Fiasco chronology
| Drill Music in Zion (2022) | Samurai (2024) | Rhymen Shop (2024) |

Singles from Samurai
- 1. "Samurai" Released: May 17, 2024; 2. "Cake" Released: June 7, 2024

Samurai is the ninth studio album by American rapper Lupe Fiasco. It was released through 1st & 15th Entertainment and Thirty Tigers on June 28, 2024, as a follow-up to his eighth studio album, Drill Music in Zion (2022). The album marks his first to contain no guest features, and is his shortest studio album to date, containing eight tracks. Production was handled solely by Soundtrakk, who previously produced the entirety of Drill Music. Samurai was supported by the two singles, "Samurai" and "Cake," with a music video issued for each.

Inspired by Amy Winehouse, who is named as one of his favorite artists, Fiasco created the concept of her becoming a battle rapper. He embarked on the promotional Samurai Tour from October to December 2024.

A deluxe edition of the album was released on August 22, 2025, in an extended play format. It included two bonus tracks, three remixes, and five instrumentals, the latter exclusive to only vinyl copies.

== Background ==
Whilst work on Samurai began proper in the midst of the COVID-19 pandemic, many of the beats for the project were authored as early as 2018. In an interview with Rolling Stone, Fiasco revealed that the album wasn't intended to be a Winehouse biography or to tell her story. He continued, "For me, it was literally just that one quote. I wouldn't dare try to rewrite or even postscript her legacy in any way other than just imagine everything like, 'Yo, what if she was a battle rapper?'" He searched through the folder of beats Soundtrakk had sent him, where the oldest beat, created in 2016, was used for "No. 1 Headband". He recorded a majority of the album on GarageBand, in his living room.

Samurai was conceived as a standalone single, unintentionally becoming an album. Fiasco noted the ambiguity and universal themes across each track, which "could have just been about anybody," focusing on the struggles artists face within the entertainment industry. The narrative on the album is actually disjointed, showing different parts of Winehouse's life as a battle rapper or a jazz singer. Fiasco told Flood Magazine, "The thing I started last may be the thing that comes out first. I wouldn't put too much weight into the chronology of the work."

In July 2023, his manager Chilly was released from prison after 20 years, and helped with the post-production for Samurai, including sequencing and label decisions.

== Release and promotion ==
At his Coachella performance in April 2024, Fiasco announced his latest album would be coming out that summer. He shared in a press release that the album's title 'Samurai' means "to serve," where he identified it as "you need to be at the service of other people, either in the overall community, or in this instance, the rap community at large that I've been a part of for years."

The same day as the release of his lead single and title track, "Samurai," he announced his album will drop on June 28. He named it to be his "most personal album to date," and was inspired by a quote from the 2015 documentary film Amy, where the film's subject Amy Winehouse told her producer Salaam Remi, "I keep coming out with battle raps and they're just pouring out of me. Like Wu-Tang stuff, but really neat, very beautifully alliterated little battle raps. So next time you wanna come for me and have a battle rap-off, I'm gonna kill you. Because I'm a samurai." Fiasco wanted to sample this recording in the title track, though they were unable to get it cleared.

The album's second single, "Cake," was released on June 7, 2024. This followed by a music video for the song, "No. 1 Headband," released the same day as the album. On October 31, 2024, the remix music video for "Palaces" premiered, featuring additional vocals from Wisconsin singer Troy Tyler.

On June 11, 2025, he announced the deluxe version of Samurai, scheduled for release on August 22, 2025. On June 27, he released the two remixes for "Samurai" and "Palaces," both featuring Tyler. On July 25, 2025, he released "SOS" as a single for the album's deluxe edition. It was accompanied the same day by its lyric video uploaded to his YouTube channel.

== Artwork ==
The album artwork was created by Chilly's son, Dakari Patton. It features a drawing of Fiasco as an afro-samurai.

== Critical reception ==
Professional ratings
Review scores
| Source | Rating |
|---|---|
| Clash | 8/10 |
| Pitchfork | 7.4/10 |
| Sputnikmusic | 4.5/5 |

Jazmin Kylene, writing for Clash, stated: "Keeping us well-fed and in constant questioning, there is no doubt Lupe Fiasco is fulfilling his purpose and artistic servitude every time he obliges to step back into the dojo." Sputnikmusic in similar praise called it "A well thought-out and carefully handled concept," adding it to be Fiasco's "best collection of work in nearly a decade, independent of its rhetorical aims."

Pitchfork editor Paul Thompson wrote, "reunites with producer Soundtrakk for a jazzy, subdued album that weighs the challenges and indignities of sustaining a career in the arts."

== Track listing ==
All tracks are written by Wasalu Jaco. All tracks produced by Soundtrakk.

Standard edition
| No. | Title | Producer(s) | Length |
|---|---|---|---|
| 1. | "Samurai" | Soundtrakk | 3:14 |
| 2. | "Mumble Rap" | Soundtrakk | 4:15 |
| 3. | "Cake" | Soundtrakk; Kush Baby^{[a]} | 3:22 |
| 4. | "Palaces" | Soundtrakk; Nicolas Isaiah^{[a]}; Trumaine Jordan^{[a]} | 3:45 |
| 5. | "No. 1 Headband" | Soundtrakk; Brian L. Brown^{[a]}; Kush Baby^{[b]} | 4:23 |
| 6. | "Bigfoot" | Soundtrakk; APB^{[a]}; Nicolas Isaiah^{[a]}; Trumaine Jordan^{[a]} | 3:45 |
| 7. | "Outside" | Soundtrakk; Kush Baby^{[a]} | 4:14 |
| 8. | "Til Eternity" | Soundtrakk | 3:55 |
| Total length: | | | 30:53 |

Deluxe edition (streaming)
| No. | Title | Producer(s) | Length |
|---|---|---|---|
| 1. | "High Note" (featuring Luv Moore) | Soundtrakk; Anthony Perkin | 3:55 |
| 2. | "Samurai (Remix)" (featuring Troy Tyler) | Soundtrakk; Anthony Perkin; Atom Grey; Isaiah | 4:33 |
| 3. | "SOS" | Lupe Fiasco; Perkins^{[b]}; Isaiah^{[b]} | 3:56 |
| 4. | "Palaces (Remix)" (featuring Troy Tyler) | Soundtrakk; Isaiah^{[a]}; Trumaine Jordan^{[a]} | 3:45 |
| 5. | "Bigfoot (Remix)" (featuring Troy Tyler) | Soundtrakk; Perkins^{[a]}; Isaiah^{[a]}; Jordan^{[a]} | 3:45 |
| Total length: | | | 19:54 |

Deluxe edition (vinyl)
| No. | Title | Length |
|---|---|---|
| 6. | "High Note" (Instrumental) |
| 7. | "Samurai (Remix)" (Instrumental) |
| 8. | "S.O.S." (Instrumental) |
| 9. | "Palaces (Remix)" (Instrumental) |
| 10. | "Bigfoot (Remix)" (Instrumental) |

Notes

- ^{^[a]} signifies a co-producer.
- ^{^[b]} signifies an additional producer.
- The album booklet erroneously credits Nicolas Isaiah as Nicolaus Isaiah.

Sample credits

- "Samurai" contains a sample of "East River Drive", written and performed by Grover Washington Jr.

== Personnel ==
Musicians

- Lupe Fiasco – vocals (all tracks); additional arrangement, trumpet (track 2)
- Rudolph "Soundtrakk" Lopez – drum programming, arrangement (all tracks); sampler (tracks 1–4, 6, 8); keyboards (tracks 6–8); flute, harp, strings (track 7); bass (tracks 2, 8)
- Crystal Torres – trumpet, flute (track 1); flugelhorn (tracks 1, 8); horns (track 8)
- Greg "Brahmulus" Brookshire – bass guitar (tracks 1, 4, 8); electric guitar (track 5)
- Jameel "JProof" Roberts – saxophone (track 1)
- Kush Baby – drum programming (tracks 3, 5, 7); synthesizers (tracks 3, 7); additional arrangement (track 3); arrangement (track 7)
- Crystal Torres – trumpet, flute (track 1); flugelhorn (tracks 1, 8); horns (track 8)
- Nicolas Isaiah – drum programming (tracks 4, 6); sampler, effects (track 4); production arrangement, synthesizer lead (track 6); drum layering (track 7)
- Trumaine Jordan – drum programming, sampler, effects (track 4)
- Brian L. Brown – electric piano (track 5)
- Luv Moore – background vocals (track 5)
- Lajé – background vocals (track 5)
- Anthony "APB" Perkin – synthesizers (track 1); keyboards (track 6); piano (track 8)

Technical

- Lupe Fiasco – executive production, engineering
- Charles "Chilly" Patton – executive production (all tracks), mixing (track 3)
- Soundtrakk – vocal engineering (track 4)
- Abel Garabaldi – mixing (tracks 1–2, 4–8)
- Yuki Tasaka – mixing (track 3)
- Maxwell Steger – mixing assistance
- Joey Fernandez – mastering (all tracks); mixing (track 3)
- Dakari Patton – artwork

== Charts ==
Chart performance for Samurai
| Chart (2024) | Peak position |
|---|---|
| UK R&B Albums (Official Charts) | 23 |
