= Matters of the Bittersweet =

Studio album by Matthew Santos
- Released: 2007
- Recorded: 2007
- Genre: Acoustic, alternative rock, folk
- Label: Candyrat

Matthew Santos chronology
As a Crow Flies (2006)	Matters of the Bittersweet (2007)

Matters of the Bittersweet is the first solo acoustic album by singer Matthew Santos. Released in November 2007 under Candy Rat Records, the album features addition of four songs where he is joined by band members Robert Tucker on 'Humming'burd' and Aviva Jaye on vocals and clarinet on three songs; 'Unnamable', 'Daughter of the Sun', and 'Drop a Coin'. The video recordings off "Matters of the Bittersweet" are among the top rated videos on YouTube.

In an interview with Billboard Magazine, Santos said about Matters of the Bittersweet, "It was all done live with one mic in my basement... nothing glamorous. I want to stay with that rootsy feel."

== Track listing ==
#	Title
1	Shadows in a Shoebox
2	Uncertainties
3	Humming'burd
4	Love Sick Fool
5	Waiting for the Day
6	Daughter of the Sun
7	My Remedy
8	Old Man Winter
9	Unnamable
10	Drop a Coin
11	Lady Luna
12	Matters of the Bittersweet
