= Hip Hop Saved My Life =

2008 single by Lupe Fiasco

"Hip-Hop Saved My Life"

Single by Lupe Fiasco featuring Nikki Jean

from the album Lupe Fiasco's The Cool
- Released: March 18, 2008
- Recorded: 2007
- Genre: Alternative hip hop
- Length: 4:03
- Label: 1st & 15th; Atlantic
- Songwriters: Wasalu Jaco; Nicholle Leary; Rudolph Lopez
- Producer: Soundtrakk

Lupe Fiasco featuring Nikki Jean singles chronology
"Superstar" (2007)	"Hip-Hop Saved My Life" (2008)	"Paris, Tokyo" (2008)

"Hip-Hop Saved My Life" is the second single from Lupe Fiasco's second album, Lupe Fiasco's The Cool. The track features vocals from Nikki Jean, the lead singer of Nouveau Riche. Its music video went viral.

== Content ==
The single is a heartfelt song that tells the story of an underground rap artist, his personal problems, and his struggle and desire to achieve success. The rapper composes a song with a doggerel structure and a hook, "Somethin', somethin', somethin' / Stack that Cheese", street slang for making money. Author Charlotte Pence argues that Fiasco achieves simple complexity in the song, rebelling against simplistic lyrics while simultaneously exploiting them.

It was revealed on MTV that the song was partially based on the life and career of Southern rapper Slim Thug and dedicated to Bun B.

== Music video ==
The music video, directed by Houston's own Dr. Teeth, was released on March 18, 2008. The video recounts the story of a young up-and-coming rapper and the obstacles he struggles to overcome. The video includes appearances by Slim Thug, Willie D, Nikki Jean, K-Rino, Paul Wall, and Bun B with Lupe Fiasco. In one scene towards the beginning of the video, a clip from the video for "Superstar" (another one of Fiasco's songs) can briefly be seen playing on a television set.

== Chart performance ==
It has first appeared on Billboard as of May 31, charting at #25 on the Bubbling Under R&B/Hip-Hop Singles chart, then peaking at #20 a week later.

== Certifications ==
Region	Certification	Certified units/sales
United States (RIAA)	Gold	500,000^{‡}
^{‡} Sales+streaming figures based on certification alone.
