= Hurt Me Soul =

Song by Lupe Fiasco

from the album Lupe Fiasco's Food & Liquor
- Released: September 19, 2006
- Recorded: 2006
- Genre: Hip hop
- Length: 4:22
- Label: 1st & 15th; Atlantic
- Composer(s): Wasalu Jaco; Khari Cain; Tony Camillo; Mary Sawyer
- Producer(s): Needlz

"Hurt Me Soul" is a song written by rapper Lupe Fiasco. The Needlz-produced track was released in September 2006 on his debut album Lupe Fiasco's Food & Liquor. Before the opening verse, you can hear Lupe say "Istaghfirallah". In the opening verse, Lupe first acknowledges his own hypocritical tendencies during his younger years, and even more so the overbearing presence of hypocrisy in the modern rap scene. Afterward, he makes reference to the fact that contemporary rap music is being flooded with the glorification or subliminal promotion of misogyny, drug-dealing, materialism and violence. However, this kind of rap music can be metaphorically viewed as the world in general, for these vices still continue to exist universally, even in societies where rap is absent. Despite his evidently strong opposition for such distasteful music, Lupe contradicts himself by questioning whether or not hip-hop should be criticized for such things. In doing so, he explains how rap legends such as 2Pac, Nas, Too Short, and Jay-Z (who are frequent sources for such glorification) rap about these subjects as they are in reality "coming true", despite the vulgarity of it all.

As the track arrives at the last verse, Lupe lists a lengthy catalog of what he believes corrupts the world. Consequently, in the three different hooks, Lupe speaks as a representative for numerous anonymous people suffering from this corruption, still bearing the general theme that virtually everyone on earth is susceptible to misfortune. He mourns for the world as a result, hence the title "Hurt Me Soul.". This title involves a slight play on words of the common phrase: it "hurts me so".
