= Lupe Fiasco's Food & Liquor =

Studio album by Lupe Fiasco
- Released: September 19, 2006
- Recorded: 2003–2006
- Studios: 1st & 15th (Chicago); Record Plant (Hollywood); Right Track (New York City)
- Genres: Hip hop; conscious hip hop
- Length: 72:13
- Labels: 1st & 15th; Atlantic
- Producers: Jay-Z (exec.); Charles "Chilly" Patton (exec.); Lupe Fiasco (exec.); The Neptunes; Kanye West; Mike Shinoda; Craig Kallman; Prolyfic; Needlz; Soundtrakk; Brandon Howard

Lupe Fiasco chronology
Lupe Fiasco's Food & Liquor (2006)	Lupe Fiasco's The Cool (2007)

Singles from Lupe Fiasco's Food & Liquor
- 1. "Kick, Push" Released: April 18, 2006; 2. "I Gotcha" Released: August 8, 2006; 3. "Daydreamin'" Released: September 11, 2006

Lupe Fiasco's Food & Liquor, commonly referred to as Food & Liquor or abbreviated to LFFL, is the debut studio album by American rapper Lupe Fiasco. It was released on September 19, 2006, through 1st & 15th Entertainment and Atlantic Records. The album features production from The Neptunes, Kanye West, Mike Shinoda, Craig Kallman, Prolyfic, Needlz, Soundtrakk, and Brandon Howard. Jay-Z, Chill, and Fiasco himself are credited as the executive producers for the album. Songs on the record discuss poverty, Islam, terrorism, racism, and individuality.

Originally, the album was reported to have debuted at number 12 on the Billboard 200; however, due to incomplete Nielsen SoundScan reports, the album actually debuted at number eight. The album received four Grammy Award nominations, including Grammy Award for Best Rap Album at the 49th Grammy Awards. "Daydreamin'", featuring Jill Scott, won Best Urban/Alternative Song at the 50th Grammy Awards. The album was digitally re-released on September 13, 2011, to mark its 5th anniversary; this version features four new tracks. On April 30, 2015, Fiasco released a music video for "Just Might Be OK", nine years after the album's original release.

== Background and conception ==
At age 19, Fiasco was signed to Epic Records as a member of a hip hop group called Da Pak. The group released one single before splitting up. He later signed a recording contract with Arista Records, but was dropped when president and chief executive officer (CEO), L. A. Reid, was fired. In 2006, fellow rapper Jay-Z was impressed by Fiasco's feature on Kanye West's "Touch the Sky" and agreed to become the executive producer of the album.

The title of the album, somewhat of a surprise for many coming from a Muslim, references the various Food and Liquor stores in Chicago neighborhoods. It also refers to the "constant tug of war between good (food) and evil (liquor)". The title is a philosophy that Fiasco believes about human nature. He went on to elaborate:

"In Chicago, instead of having bodegas like in New York, the majority of the corner stores are called 'Food and Liquors.' The store is where everything is at, whether it be the wine-o hanging by the store, or us as kids going back and forth to the store to buy something. The 'Food' is the good part and the 'Liquor' is the bad part. I try to balance out both parts of me."

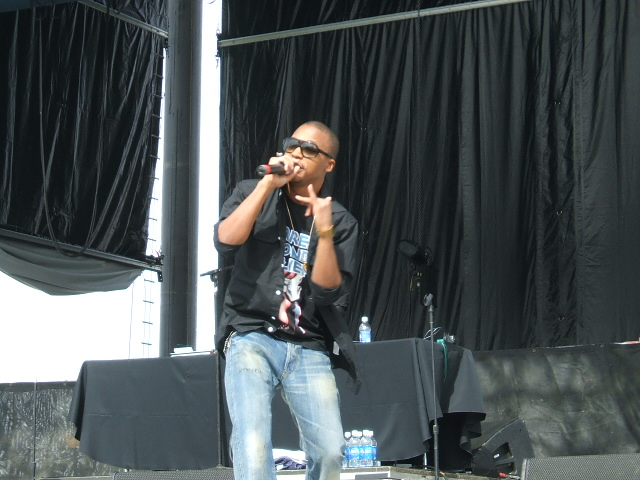
Lupe Fiasco performing

Prior to the release of Food & Liquor, Fiasco was one of Rolling Stone magazine's "List of Artists to Watch" in 2006. In April 2006, the entire album was leaked onto the Internet, which resulted in it being shelved. With the leak of the album, Fiasco was heralded as the potential "savior of hip hop" by critics, as well as fellow recording artists West and Williams. In response of the leak, Fiasco recorded additional songs for the album. Despite stating he would only work with Prolyfic and Soundtrakk, he also worked with other record producers, including Kanye West, Pharrell Williams, and Mike Shinoda. Recording sessions took place at the 1st & 15th Studios in Chicago, Illinois, the Record Plant Studios in Hollywood, California and the Right Track Studios in New York City, New York. Prior to its release, Fiasco had to make "several last-minute changes" due to "sample issues".

== Musical content ==
=== Subject matter ===
Food & Liquor contains elements of alternative hip hop. Fiasco covers a wide variety of subjects on the album. The opening track begins with Fiasco chanting the opening lines of the Qur'an in Arabic. The following track, "Real", is a reflection of "making music of which he doesn't have to be ashamed". "Kick, Push", the album's lead single, is about a young male and his love for skateboarding. The lyrics follow the skateboarder through many stages of his life such as his childhood, finding love, marriage, and adulthood. Although the literal meaning of this song is skateboarding, the actual meaning of the song is rejection, and being criticized for doing what one loves. On "The Instrumental", Fiasco addresses addiction to television. "He Say She Say" deals with the story of a single mother and a child lacking a father figure. "The Cool" follows the story of a dead gangster who rises from the grave and returns to the hood where he lived and died. With its "haunting keys and strings", "Hurt Me Soul" deals with displacement and alienation from his neighborhood. On "American Terrorist", Fiasco discusses the misconceptions of Islam in America. He also addresses the issues of racism and gun culture. The song had originally sampled a song by Chick Corea, but due to sampling issues, it was never cleared. For example, the song opens with,"We came through the storm, nooses on our necks, and a smallpox blanket to keep us warm." The album concludes with Lupe reading off an extensive appreciation list of people who helped with the album.

=== Production ===
Food & Liquor was handled by a variety of different producers; some lesser-known such as Prolyfic, Soundtrakk, Needlz and Craig Kallman, while also having tracks produced by well-known producers such as Kanye West, Mike Shinoda and The Neptunes. On "Kick, Push", Soundtrakk provided lush strings and horns as the backdrop. Strings are prominent through the album particularly on songs such as "Hurt Me Soul", "He Say She Say", and "Daydreamin'". "Daydreamin'" contains a sample of the well-known song "Daydream in Blue" as covered by I Monster as the chorus. "American Terrorist" contains a middle-eastern style beat provided by Prolyfic. The Neptunes provided a more synth and keyboard based beat on "I Gotcha". Brandon Howard provides a lush piano loop on "Kick, Push II".

== Artwork ==
The album cover of Food & Liquor was designed by Chuck Anderson and Righteous Kung Fu. It was inspired by a skateboard deck Fiasco owned. The cover shows Fiasco floating in air, surrounded by several items, including a Banksy postcard, a Nintendo DS, a sketchbook, the Qur'an, and a robot. He explained that the items were picked out carefully, as they were things he "carr[ied] around every day". In the liner notes, Fiasco parodies drug dealing by replacing liquor with milk and cookies, and drive-by shootings by replacing guns with books.

== Reception and legacy ==
=== Critical response ===
Professional ratings
Aggregate scores
Source	Rating
Metacritic	83/100
Review scores
Source	Rating
AllMusic	5/5 stars
The A.V. Club	A
Entertainment Weekly	B+
Mojo	4/5 stars
MSN Music (Consumer Guide)	A−
NME	7/10
Pitchfork	7.9/10
Rolling Stone	4/5 stars
Slant Magazine	4.5/5 stars
Uncut	4/5 stars

Food & Liquor received widespread acclaim from music critics. At Metacritic, which assigns a normalized rating out of 100 to reviews from mainstream critics, the album received an average score of 83, based on 20 reviews. Several writers lauded the lyrical content on the album. Nathan Rabin of The A.V. Club praised the album, saying that Fiasco "masterfully melds his peerless storytelling gifts with his idiosyncratic passion for skateboarding, fantasy, and incisive sociopolitical commentary". He also noted that Fiasco "boldly expand[ed] the parameters of mainstream hip-hop". Sarah Godfrey of The Washington Post hailed the album as a "masterpiece of responsible rap". Darryl Sterdan of Jam! called the album "one of the sharpest and smartest hip-hop discs" of 2006, while Andy Kellman of AllMusic argued that "Food and Liquor just might be the steadiest and most compelling rap album of 2006". Stylus Magazine's Josh Love felt that it benefits greatly from Fiasco's impressive rapping and subtlety, which he found to be characteristics that are "incredibly rare in hip-hop in 2006". Sean Fennessey of Pitchfork was less enthusiastic and said that although Fiasco's raps are abundant with "wit and double meaning", the album's biggest flaw is his inability to write memorable hooks, which are instead "blandly-sung, unmemorable couplets".

=== Commercial performance ===
Food & Liquor debuted at number eight on the Billboard 200, selling 81,000 copies in its first week. As of January 2008, it went on to sell 325,000 copies in the United States. As of September 22, 2021, the album is certified gold by the RIAA.

=== Accolades ===
The album was named best hip hop album of 2006 by several publications and was ranked within several year-end lists. It was also one of the best-reviewed albums of 2006 at Metacritic. Food & Liquor finished 34th in the voting for the Pazz & Jop, an annual critics poll run by The Village Voice. Robert Christgau, the poll's creator, named it the 19th best album of the year in his own list. The album was also included in the book 1001 Albums You Must Hear Before You Die.

The album earned Fiasco three nominations at the 2007 49th Grammy Awards: Best Rap Album, Best Rap Solo Performance and Best Rap Song for "Kick, Push". In 2008, "Daydreamin'" won the award for Best Urban/Alternative Performance at the 50th Grammy Awards.

=== Singles ===
The first international single off the album was "Kick, Push", a love story about two misfit skateboarders. The second single in Europe was "Daydreamin'" (featuring Jill Scott) which features a sample of I Monster's cover of "Daydream in Blue." The second single in the U.S. (and the third international single) was "I Gotcha" which is produced by The Neptunes. The song's video was featured on MTV's "Making the Video." Fiasco held a poll on his MySpace profile, where fans were able to vote for which song they wanted to be made into a music video.

== Track listing ==
Food & Liquor
No.	Title	Writer(s)	Producer(s)	Length
1.	"Intro"	Wasalu Jaco; Ayesha Jaco; Kanye West	Chris & Drop	3:06
2.	"Real" (featuring Sarah Green)	Jaco; Harvey Mason; Kenny Mason; Rudolph Lopez	Soundtrakk	4:02
3.	"Just Might Be OK" (featuring Gemini)	Jaco; Paul Humphrey; David Ewing Jr.	Prolyfic	4:24
4.	"Kick, Push"	Jaco; R. Lopez	Soundtrakk	4:13
5.	"I Gotcha"	Jaco; Pharrell Williams	The Neptunes	3:58
6.	"The Instrumental" (featuring Jonah Matranga)	Jaco; Chris Robyn; John Gutenberger; Jonah Matranga; Shaun Lopez; Mike Shinoda	Shinoda	3:26
7.	"He Say She Say" (featuring Gemini & Sarah Green)	Jaco; Burt Bacharach; Hal Bowen; R. Lopez	Soundtrakk	4:12
8.	"Sunshine"	Jaco; R. Lopez	Soundtrakk	3:55
9.	"Daydreamin'" (featuring Jill Scott)	Jaco; Craig Kallman; Dave Mackay; Raymond Vincent; Sylveer Van Holman	Craig Kallman	3:55
10.	"The Cool"	Jaco; Dexter Wansel; Kanye West	West	3:46
11.	"Hurt Me Soul"	Jaco; Mary Sawyer; Khari Cain; Tony Camillo	Needlz	4:22
12.	"Pressure" (featuring Jay-Z)	Jaco; Bill Schnee; Mike Melvoin; Ewing Jr.; Shawn Carter	Prolyfic	4:47
13.	"American Terrorist" (featuring Matthew Santos)	Jaco; Armando Corea; Ewing Jr.	Prolyfic	4:40
14.	"The Emperor's Soundtrack"	Jaco; Michael Schenker; R. Lopez	Soundtrakk	2:56
15.	"Kick, Push II"	Jaco; Brandon Howard	Howard	4:11
16.	"Outro"	Jaco	Chris & Drop	12:13

iTunes Deluxe edition bonus track
No.	Title	Writer(s)	Producer(s)	Length
17.	"Theme Music to a Drive-By"	Jaco; LeRoy Bell; Thom Bell; Casey James	Prolyfic	3:04

Limited edition CD bonus tracks
No.	Title	Writer(s)	Producer(s)	Length
17.	"Tilted"	Jaco; Cain	Needlz	3:33
18.	"Carrera Lu"	Jaco; Ewing Jr.; Michael Beal; Wade Flemons; Verdine White; Maurice White; Don Whitehead	Prolyfic	3:11
19.	"What It Do"	Jaco; Howard; Sidney Miller	Howard	4:07

5th Anniversary edition digital bonus tracks
No.	Title	Writer(s)	Producer(s)	Length
17.	"Theme Music to a Drive-By"	Jaco; L. Bell; T. Bell; James	Prolyfic	3:04
18.	"Tilted"	Jaco; Cain	Needlz	3:32
19.	"Carrera Lu"	Jaco; Ewing Jr.; Beal; Flemons; V. White; M. White; Whitehead	Prolyfic	3:10
20.	"What It Do"	Jaco; Howard; Miller	Howard	4:07

Notes

- "Intro" is performed with Ayesha Jaco, Fiasco's older sister. She also provides the opening poem for his sophomore album, The Cool (2007).

Sample credits

- "Real" contains a sample of "How Does It Feel", written by Kenny Mason and Harvey Mason, as performed by the latter.
- "Just Might Be O.K." contains a sample of "Humphrey's Overture", written and performed by Paul Humphrey.
- "Kick, Push" contains a sample of "Magtaksil Man Ikaw (Bolero Medley)", written by Levi Celerio and Felipe Maninang, as performed by Celeste Legaspi.
- "The Instrumental" contains a sample of "Nestle", written by Jonah Matranga, Shaun Lopez, John Gutenberger, and Chris Robyn, as performed by Far.
- "He Say, She Say" contains a sample of "The Last One to Be Loved", written by Burt Bacharach and Hal David, as performed by Bacharach; and "Mesopotamia", written by Fred Schneider, Kate Pierson, Keith Strickland, and Ricky Wilson, as performed by The B-52's.
- "Sunshine" contains a sample of "Friend to Friend", written by Nile Rodgers and Bernard Edwards, as performed by Diana Ross.
- "Daydreamin'" contains a sample of "Daydream", written by David MacKay, Raymond Vincent, and Silveer Vanholme, as performed by I Monster.
- "The Cool" contains a sample of "Life on Mars", written and performed by Dexter Wansel, and "Funky Drummer", written and performed by James Brown.
- "Hurt Me Soul" contains a sample of "Stay with Me", written by Mary Sawyer and Tony Camillo, as performed by Cecil Holmes.
- "Pressure" contains a sample of "Pressure Cooker", written by Bill Schnee and Mike Melvoin, as performed by Thelma Houston.
- "American Terrorist" contains a sample of "The Romantic Warrior", written by Chick Corea, as performed by Return to Forever.
- "The Emperor's Soundtrack" contains a sample of "Between the Walls", written by Michael Schenker and Phil Mogg, as performed by UFO.
- "Theme Music to a Drive-By" contains a sample of "(Do It, Do It) No One Does It Better", written by Casey James and LeRoy Bell, as performed by The Spinners.
- "Carrera Lu" contains a sample of "Bad Tune", written by Michael Beal, Wade Flemons, Don Whitehead, Maurice White, and Verdine White, as performed by Earth, Wind & Fire.

== Personnel ==
As listed on Allmusic.

- Mireya Acierto – photography
- Chuck Anderson – cover art
- James Auwarter – mixing, mixing assistant
- Craig Bauer – mixing
- Jeff Breakley – mixing assistant
- Chill – executive producer, management
- Andrew Coleman – engineer
- Bojan Dugich – engineer, mixing
- Lupe Fiasco – executive producer
- Patrick Fong – design
- Brian Gartner – vocal engineer
- Chris Gehringer – mastering
- Sarah Green – performer
- Brandon Howard – producer
- I Monster – producer
- Jay-Z – executive producer
- Chris Jennings – assistant engineer
- Darrale Jones – executive producer
- Craig Kallman – producer
- Greg Magers – engineer
- Jonah Matranga – performer
- The Neptunes – producer
- Ryan Neuschafer – mixing assistant
- Prolyfic – producer
- Will Quinell – mastering assistant
- Righteous Kung Fu – creative director, cover art
- Jason Salvador – management
- Matthew Santos – performer
- Mike Shinoda – producer
- Soundtrakk – producer
- Reed "Mountain Man" Taylor – assistant engineer
- Patrick Viala – mixing
- Kanye West – producer, consultant

== Charts ==
=== Weekly charts ===
Weekly chart performance for Lupe Fiasco's Food & Liquor
Chart (2006)	Peak position
Dutch Albums (Album Top 100)	74
French Albums (SNEP)	172
UK Albums (Official Charts)	31
US Billboard 200	8
US Top R&B/Hip-Hop Albums (Billboard)	2

=== Year-end charts ===
2006 year-end chart performance for Lupe Fiasco's Food & Liquor
Chart (2006)	Position
US Top R&B/Hip-Hop Albums (Billboard)	88

== Certifications ==
Certifications for Lupe Fiasco's Food & Liquor
Region	Certification	Certified units/sales
United Kingdom (BPI)	Silver	60,000^{‡}
United States (RIAA)	Gold	500,000^{‡}
^{‡} Sales+streaming figures based on certification alone.
