= I Gotcha (Lupe Fiasco song) =

Single by Lupe Fiasco

from the album Lupe Fiasco's Food & Liquor
- Released: August 8, 2006 (US); November 27, 2006 (UK)
- Recorded: 2006; The Record Plant (Hollywood, California)
- Genre: Hip-hop
- Length: 3:56
- Label: 1st & 15th; Atlantic
- Songwriter(s): Wasalu Jaco; Pharrell Williams
- Producer(s): The Neptunes

Lupe Fiasco singles chronology
"Kick Push" (2006)	"I Gotcha" (2006)	"Daydreamin'" (2006)

"I Gotcha" is the second single from Lupe Fiasco's debut album, Lupe Fiasco's Food & Liquor. The song was produced by The Neptunes. "And He Gets The Girl" is featured as a B-Side to this single.

== Composition and lyrics ==
In the call and response chorus, Fiasco self-censors to avoid profanity ("You want the real shhh? I gotcha"), in alignment with his desire to minimize swearing and promote more positive messages in his music due to his Muslim faith.

== Reception ==
Whilst criticising Lupe Fiasco's Food & Liquor for being "...just not that fun", Sean Fennessey of Pitchfork praised "I Gotcha" for demonstrating how "Fiasco's at his best when he's a bit livelier", describing it as "effervescent" and "one the best Neptunes tracks in years".

== Music video ==
The music video for "I Gotcha" was directed by Kevin Hunter and filmed in Los Angeles. It was featured on MTV's show, Making the Video and was primarily shot in before a green screen. Pharrell, Lupe's sister, and many of his friends made cameo appearances in the video.

== Track listings ==
CD single 1

1. "I Gotcha"
2. "And He Gets The Girl" (non-album track)

CD single 2

1. "I Gotcha"
2. "Pills" (non-album track)
3. "I Gotcha" (Video)

US Promo single

1. "I Gotcha" (Radio Edit) – 3:59
2. "I Gotcha" (Instrumental) – 3:58
3. "I Gotcha" (Album Version) 3:58
4. "I Gotcha" (Acapella) 3:59

UK 12" Single

1. "I Gotcha" – 3:58
2. "I Gotcha" (Instrumental) – 3:58
3. "I Gotcha" (A Capella) – 3:39
4. "And He Gets The Girl" (Non-album track)– 4:11

== Personnel ==
- Songwriters: Wasalu Muhammad Jaco, Pharrell Williams
- Producer: The Neptunes
- Recorders: Andrew Coleman, Brian Gartner
- Mixer: Pat Viala

== Chart positions ==
Chart (2007)	Peak Position
U.S. Billboard Hot R&B/Hip-Hop Songs	86
UK Singles Chart	140
