= Superstar (Lupe Fiasco song) =

Single by Lupe Fiasco featuring Matthew Santos

from the album Lupe Fiasco's The Cool
- Released: September 25, 2007
- Recorded: 2006
- Genre: Hip hop
- Length: 4:49 (album version); 3:59 (radio version)
- Label: 1st & 15th; Atlantic
- Songwriters: Wasalu Jaco; Matthew Santos; Rudolph Lopez
- Producer: Soundtrakk

Lupe Fiasco singles chronology
"The Emperor's Soundtrack" (2007)	"Superstar" (2007)	"Hip Hop Saved My Life" (2008)

Music video
- "Superstar" on YouTube

"Superstar" is a song performed by rapper Lupe Fiasco featuring Matthew Santos. It is the first single off his 2007 album Lupe Fiasco's The Cool. iTunes released "Superstar" on September 25, 2007, along with a radio version of "Dumb It Down."

On November 5, 2007, the official video was released, and it was directed by Hype Williams. It premiered on BET's 106 & Park on November 23, and on February 19, it moved up to the number one spot on the countdown. As of December 31, it appeared at number 84 on BET's Notarized: Top 100 Videos of 2007 countdown. The song is featured on the soundtracks of NFL Tour and NHL 2K10. Star baseball player Hanley Ramírez used the song as his walk-up music at Florida Marlins home games. "Superstar" peaked at number ten on the Billboard Hot 100. Outside of the United States, "Superstar" peaked within the top ten of the charts in the Republic of Ireland, Turkey, and the United Kingdom.

In the song, Lupe yells "FREE CHILLY" which is a reference to another song on his album. The song "Free Chilly" is about Lupe's business partner "Chilly", who was sentenced to 44 years in jail during the recording of "The Cool".

On August 19th, 2023, UFC Fighter Sean O'Malley debuted superstar as his walkout song during UFC 292, which then led to it being his iconic walkout song.

== Critical reception ==
Most critics were positive towards the single. Complex ranked it at 95 on their 100 best songs of the 2000s. Bill Lamb, representing the music website About.com, awarded the song four-and-a-half stars, and gave primary praise to "Lupe Fiasco's dense lyrical meditation on life in the spotlight", "Matthew Santos' haunting vocals", and the "immediate setup of the melodic hook"; however, he did emphasize Santos' vocal delivery to be similar to that of Coldplay frontman Chris Martin — of which both Fiasco and Santos are reportedly fans — citing it as both a positive and negative characteristic of the song. Pitchfork, in an otherwise positive outlook, expressed a similar sentiment: "The hooky first single [is] "Superstar", with Fiasco protégé Matthew Santos (who has probably heard a few Coldplay albums) playing Adam Levine to Fiasco's Kanye West", thus comparing the song's style to that of "Heard 'Em Say", a Kanye West song released in 2005. However, music editor Nick Levine argues that "the hazy, gospel-inflected chorus, sung by Chicago folkie Matthew Santos, is just as memorable, suggesting everyone but Kanye should be quaking in his diamond-studded Reeboks." Blues&Soul felt that the song "blended Lupe's characteristic easy vocal flow with a pleasantly lumbering piano-led beat, a soulful hook, and the odd sample and sound effect." In a review for Yahoo Music, Jaime Gill wrote: "'Superstar' is a melancholy look at celebrity, with Fiasco delivering a languid rap about the insecurities that linger behind fame's brittle armour. It's set to a low-key piano part and a piercing, haunting chorus sung by one Matthew Santos. In one brilliant line, Lupe describes the luxuries of celebrity while skewering its loneliness: "chauffeur, chauffeur, come and take me away." It may be too subtle, slow, and sad to be a hit in today's hip hop climate, which would be deeply depressing."

== Chart performance ==
"Superstar" peaked at number 13 on the Billboard Pop Charts, and number ten on the Billboard Hot 100, becoming Lupe Fiasco's first top ten song on the chart. It also surpassed the success of his first single on the Hot R&B/Hip-Hop Songs chart, peaking at number 19, and was his first song to appear on the Rhythmic Top 40, peaking at number eight.

In the United Kingdom, "Superstar" was moved to BBC Radio 1's A-List after being made Record of the Week by both Sara Cox and Jo Whiley on December 27, 2007. As a result, the song debuted at number seven on the UK Singles Chart solely on downloads on January 13, 2008, for the week ending date January 19, 2008, before climbing to its peak of number four on the chart following its physical CD release the following week. It became Lupe Fiasco's highest-charting song in Britain to date, outperforming both of his previous biggest hits, "Kick, Push" and "Daydreamin'", both of which peaked within the top 30 of the UK Singles Chart.

The song was nominated for Best Rap/Sung Collaboration at the Grammy Awards of 2009. It was also nominated for the 2008 Teen Choice Music: Rap/Hip-Hop Song award. Additionally, "Superstar" was the theme song of Fox8's Football Superstar.

== Music video ==
The video depicts a Mercedes-Benz S-Class stopping at the red carpet. Two girls leave the car. Director Hype Williams manages to slip in two characters from Lupe Fiasco's The Cool. The Cool with his characterizing skeleton hand and The Streets with her dollar signs in her eyes. The Cool apparently sold his soul to The Game for fame and fortune. In return, The Game's wife, The Streets, made him The Coolest and gave him the Mercedes as well as his bling and the gold key he has around his neck. Santos also appears in the video in a dark, smoky room with shades on. The Video itself has been nominated for an MTV VMA for Best Hip Hop Video.

== Other versions ==
There is an official remix to the song, featuring Matthew Santos, Young Jeezy & T.I.. The song was later performed on MTV accompanied by Patrick Stump of Fall Out Boy on vocals of the end of the song.

A third version of the song was performed by Fiasco and Santos on BBC Radio in the United Kingdom, and featured an entirely acoustic instrumental without any percussion accompaniment. It was unofficially released on the internet and later officially released (20 October 2008) on BBC Radio 1's Live Lounge – Volume 3.

== Charts ==
=== Weekly charts ===
Chart (2007–2008)	Peak position
Australia (ARIA)	32
Australian Urban (ARIA)	11
Austria (Ö3 Austria Top 40)	55
Belgium (Ultratip Bubbling Under Flanders)	22
Canada Hot 100 (Billboard)	46
Germany (GfK)	39
Hungary (Rádiós Top 40)	24
Ireland (IRMA)	3
Scottish Singles Sales (Official Charts)	9
Switzerland (Schweizer Hitparade)	42
Turkey (Turkiye Top 20)	4
UK Singles (Official Charts)	4
UK Hip Hop/R&B (Official Charts)	1
US Billboard Hot 100	10
US Hot R&B/Hip-Hop Songs (Billboard)	19
US Hot Rap Songs (Billboard)	3
US Pop Airplay (Billboard)	14
US Rhythmic Airplay (Billboard)	9

=== Year-end charts ===
Chart (2008)	Position
UK Singles (Official Charts Company)	67
US Billboard Hot 100	63
US Hot R&B/Hip-Hop Songs (Billboard)	78

== Certifications ==
Region	Certification	Certified units/sales
New Zealand (RMNZ)	Gold	15,000^{‡}
United Kingdom (BPI)	Gold	400,000^{‡}
United States (RIAA)	3× Platinum	3,000,000^{‡}
^{‡} Sales+streaming figures based on certification alone.
