= Lupe Fiasco's The Cool =

Studio album by Lupe Fiasco
- Released: December 18, 2007
- Recorded: 2006–2007
- Genre: Progressive hip hop
- Length: 70:56
- Labels: 1st & 15th; Atlantic
- Producers: Lupe Fiasco; Darrale Jones; Patrick Stump; Al Shux; The Buchanans; Drop; Chris Goss; Le Messie; Simonsayz; Soundtrakk; Unkle

Lupe Fiasco chronology
Lupe Fiasco's Food & Liquor (2006)	Lupe Fiasco's The Cool (2007)	Lasers (2011)

Singles from Lupe Fiasco's The Cool
- 1. "Superstar" Released: September 25, 2007; 2. "Hip Hop Saved My Life" Released: March 18, 2008; 3. "Paris, Tokyo" Released: April 21, 2008; 4. "Dumb It Down" Released: June 5, 2008

Lupe Fiasco's The Cool (commonly referred as The Cool) is the second studio album by American rapper Lupe Fiasco. It was released on December 18, 2007, by 1st & 15th Entertainment and Atlantic Records. Recording sessions took place during 2006 to 2007, with Lupe Fiasco himself, alongside Charles Patton (Chilly) serving as the records executive producers. A concept album, The Cool was based upon the song and a title character from his debut album, Food & Liquor (2006). The album features guest appearances from Gemini, Snoop Dogg and Matthew Santos, while the production was provided by Patrick Stump, Soundtrakk and Unkle, among others.

The album debuted at number 15 on the US Billboard 200, selling 143,407 copies in its first week. The album debuted as the number-one rap record and remained for 9 weeks. As of 2022 the album has been certified platinum by the Recording Industry Association of America (RIAA). At the 2009 Grammy Awards, the album was nominated for the Best Rap Album.

== Background ==
While Fiasco was recording his second album, his father died of type II diabetes, his good friend Stack Bundles died, and his business partner and mentor—Charles "Chilly" Patton—was sentenced to 44 years in prison. When asked about the album's dark side, Fiasco replied:

Oh yeah. A lot of loss. I lost my father, I lost my business partner to prison, and I lost some friends. It was a very dark period. It still is in some aspects, but you know, I'm kind of coming out of it. But especially during the time that the album was being cooked, in my head it was a very dark kind of period.

Multiple tracks on Lupe Fiasco's The Cool expand on the story Fiasco told on the track called "The Cool" from his debut album. Fiasco introduces the characters the Streets and the Game. The album tells the story of the little boy from "He Say, She Say" who grew up without a father, and the people that step in to raise him are the Streets and the Game, with The Streets playing his female love interest and The Game his father. Speaking on the concept Fiasco said:

I expand on the story, I introduce two other characters, the Game and the Streets. The Streets is a female. She's like the action personification of the streets, the street life, the call of the streets. The Game is the same way. The Game is the personification of the game. The pimp's game, the hustler's game, the con man's game, whatever. Then they've got supernatural characteristics. Like the Cool, his right hand is rotted away. The only thing that rotted away was his right hand. It represents the rotting away of his righteousness, of his good. And the Streets and the Cool kind of have a love affair going on. So she's represented by this locket. And the locket has a key and it's on fire. And as a gift to the Cool on his rise to fame, she gave him the key. And the key represents the key to the Streets. So she wears a locket around her neck at all times. And the way the story goes, she has given that key to tons of people throughout time. Al Capone, Alexander the Great, whatever. She's giving them the key to the Streets. Fame and fortune—but also the prices. The Game, he's represented by a stripped-down skull, a skull with dice in his eyes and smoke coming out of his mouth. The billowing smoke is actually crack smoke. It's not a full concept album; it's more spread over like five [tracks], really abstractly.

Fiasco also stated that there are plans to spin The Cool into a horror-themed radio program, and a comic book. The album was also personalized into a promotion in the form of a skateboard design contest, hosted by imeem, which was won by Sluglife, the show name for designer/artist Lawrence Ervin.

=== Recording ===
In an interview with MTV News, Fiasco explained how he planned to record The Cool:

The timing is gonna be pop, pop, pop. There's gonna be a lot of setup and a lot of pre-production on this album, so it's gonna be in pieces. But the pieces won't come together, seriously, until like three weeks before it comes out. We'll probably record everything in, like, a week. So we're just gonna get it all together, map it out, have it done to a T, and then go and record. Then the fresh from the studio, fresh to mastering ... so it eliminates a lot of time and error that was surrounding [my debut].

== Reception ==
=== Commercial performance ===
The album debuted at number 15 on the Billboard 200, selling 143,407 copies in its first week in the United States. In its second week, the album rose to number 14 on the US Billboard 200. In the United Kingdom, the album debuted at number 7, due to the success of his first single, "Superstar" featuring Matthew Santos. That single reached into the top five on these singles charts. The album was certified gold in April 2008 & certified platinum in October 2022 by the Recording Industry Association of America for the shipment of 1,000,000 copies in the United States.

=== Critical response ===
Professional ratings
Aggregate scores
Source	Rating
Metacritic	77/100
Review scores
Source	Rating
AllMusic	3.5/5 stars
The A.V. Club	A−
Entertainment Weekly	A−
The Guardian	4/5 stars
MSN Music (Consumer Guide)	A−
NME	9/10
Pitchfork	8.1/10
Q	4/5 stars
Rolling Stone	4/5 stars
Spin	7/10

Lupe Fiasco's The Cool received critical acclaim from music critics. At Metacritic, which assigns a normalized rating out of 100 to reviews from mainstream critics, the album received an average score of 77, based on 30 reviews. Entertainment Weekly said "Sonically, he's got the same kind of gratifying ADHD going on. Some tracks, like 'Paris, Tokyo,' contrast his Twista-style rapid-fire delivery with a lazy rhythm that's close to smooth jazz which can be compared to A Tribe Called Quest. 'Hello/Goodbye,' at the other extreme, has U.K. electro outfit Unkle providing a tense rock feel." The New York Times, hailing the album as "one of the year’s best hip-hop albums," added that "The songs only grow more urgent as Lupe Fiasco expands his sociopolitical perspective. 'Intruder Alert' starts as a wary love song and broadens its topic to immigration. 'Little Weapon,' produced by Patrick Stump of Fall Out Boy, looks at children with guns, from child soldiers in Africa to high school shooters. AllMusic said, "He is one of the most clever artists around, and as far as telling stories with rhymes goes, he's way up there, best exemplified by 'Hip-Hop Saved My Life' (a gripping story about a struggling rapper, based on the story of Slim Thug) and 'Gotta Eat' (where Lupe's inspiration for metaphors is a cheeseburger, yet it is no more corny than Main Source's classic 'Just a Friendly Game of Baseball')."

In a less enthusiastic review for The Guardian, Alexis Petridis felt that Fiasco indulges occasionally in "sanctimonious moralising" on what is an otherwise successful album. Entertainment Weekly named The Cool the 10th best album of 2007 in their year-end list.

== Track listing ==
No.	Title	Writer(s)	Producer(s)	Length
1.	"Baba Says Cool for Thought"	Wasalu Jaco		0:46
2.	"Free Chilly" (featuring Sarah Green & Gemstones)	Jaco; Sarah Green	Soundtrakk	1:02
3.	"Go Go Gadget Flow"	Jaco; Rudolph Lopez	Soundtrakk	4:10
4.	"The Coolest"	Chris Paultre; Derrick Braxton; Jaco	The Buchanans; Drop	5:12
5.	"Superstar" (featuring Matthew Santos)	Jaco; Lopez; Santos	Soundtrakk	4:48
6.	"Paris, Tokyo"	Eumir Deodato; Jaco; Lopez	Soundtrakk	4:30
7.	"Hi-Definition" (featuring Snoop Dogg & Poo Bear)	Calvin Broadus; Alexander Shuckburgh; Jason Boyd; Jaco	Al Shux	3:51
8.	"Gold Watch"	Paultre; Braxton; Jaco	The Buchanans; Drop	4:12
9.	"Hip-Hop Saved My Life" (featuring Nikki Jean)	Jaco; Nicholle Leary; Lopez	Soundtrakk	4:02
10.	"Intruder Alert" (featuring Sarah Green)	Jaco; Lopez; Green	Soundtrakk	4:00
11.	"Streets on Fire" (featuring Matthew Santos)	Paultre; Braxton; Jaco; Santos	The Buchanans; Drop	4:40
12.	"Little Weapon" (featuring Bishop G & Nikki Jean)	Jaco; Patrick Stump; Leary; Bishop G	Stump	4:06
13.	"Gotta Eat"	Jaco; Lopez	Soundtrakk	3:24
14.	"Dumb It Down" (featuring Gemstones & Graham Burris)	Jaco; Lopez; Burris	Soundtrakk	4:03
15.	"Hello / Goodbye (Uncool)" (featuring Unkle)	Richard File; Chris Goss; Josh Homme; James Lavelle; Jaco	Lupe Fiasco; Goss; Unkle	4:26
16.	"The Die" (featuring Gemstones)	Jaco; Lopez; Barbara Wyrick; Stephen Bogard	Soundtrakk	3:23
17.	"Put You on Game"	Simon Morel; Jaco	Simonsayz	3:02
18.	"Fighters" (featuring Matthew Santos)	Le Messie; Jaco; Santos	Le Messie	3:33
19.	"Go Baby" (featuring Gemstones)	Jaco; Lopez	Soundtrakk	3:36
Total length:				70:56

Sample Credits

- "Go Go Gadget Flow" interpolates a line from "Don't Get it Twisted Freestyle" by Lupe Fiasco.
- "The Coolest" samples "Let the Drums Speak" performed by The Fatback Band.
- "Paris, Tokyo" samples "San Juan Sunset" performed by Eumir Deodato; and interpolates a line from "Ain't No Fun (If the Homies Can't Have None)" performed by Snoop Dogg featuring Nate Dogg, Kurupt and Warren G.
- "Gold Watch" samples "Do Whatever Turns You on Part. II" performed by The Prepositions.
- "Streets on Fire" samples "Amen, Brother" performed by The Winstons.
- "Little Weapon" samples "De Profundis" performed by Arvo Pärt; and interpolates a line from "Heat Under The Babyseat" by Fiasco.
- "Dumb It Down" samples "Ignorant Shit" by Fiasco.
- "Hello / Goodbye (Uncool)" samples "Chemistry" performed by Unkle.
- "The Die" samples "The Cool" by Fiasco; and "Damn Your Eyes" written by Stephen Bogard and Barbara Wyrick.

== Personnel ==
Information taken from Allmusic.

- Chris Allen – programming, digital editing, mixing
- Veronica Alvericci – marketing
- Craig Bauer– mixing
- James Book – bass, programming, digital editing
- Derrick "Drop" Braxton – producer
- Chris "Cosmic" Paultre – producer
- Jeff Breakey – digital editing, assistant
- Nathan Cabrera– art direction, design
- Pablo Clements – programming, background vocals, digital editing
- Lionel Deluy – photography
- Lupe Fiasco – producer, executive producer, vocal producer
- Richard File – organ, piano, programming, digital editing, synthesizer strings
- Chris Gehringer – mastering
- Jesse Gladstone – assistant
- Chris Goss – guitar, producer
- Josh Homme – guitar
- Darrale Jones – executive producer
- James Lavelle – background vocals
- Deborah Mannis-Gardner – sample clearance
- Andrew Painter – photography
- Krish Lingala – theremin, background vocals, guitar
- Dave Pensado – enhanced recording
- Brian Ranney – package production
- John Regan – layout design
- Jason Salvador – management
- Livia Tortella – marketing
- "You Can Ask" Giz – mixing

== Charts ==
=== Weekly charts ===
Chart (2007–08)	Peak position
Australian Albums (ARIA)	42
Australian Urban Albums (ARIA)	6
French Albums (SNEP)	129
Irish Albums (IRMA)	24
Scottish Albums (Official Charts)	18
Swiss Albums (Schweizer Hitparade)	93
UK Albums (Official Charts)	7
UK R&B Albums (Official Charts)	1
US Billboard 200	14
US Top R&B/Hip-Hop Albums (Billboard)	4

=== Year-end charts ===
Chart (2008)	Position
US Billboard 200	81
US Top R&B/Hip-Hop Albums (Billboard)	18

== Release history ==
Region	Date
United States	December 18, 2007
Canada	December 18, 2007
United Kingdom	January 21, 2008
Japan	January 3, 2008

== Certifications ==
Certifications and sales for Lupe Fiasco's The Cool
Region	Certification	Certified units/sales
United Kingdom (BPI)	Silver	60,000^{*}
United States (RIAA)	Platinum	1,000,000^{‡}
^{*} Sales figures based on certification alone.^{‡} Sales+streaming figures based on certification alone.
