= Paris, Tokyo =

Single by Lupe Fiasco

from the album Lupe Fiasco's The Cool
- Released: April 21, 2008
- Recorded: 2007
- Genre: Alternative hip hop
- Length: 4:30
- Label: 1st & 15th; Atlantic
- Songwriters: Wasalu Jaco; Eumir Deodato; Rudolph Lopez
- Producer: Soundtrakk

Lupe Fiasco singles chronology
"Hip Hop Saved My Life" (2008)	"Paris, Tokyo" (2008)	"The Show Goes On" (2010)

Music video
- "Paris, Tokyo" on YouTube

"Paris, Tokyo" is a Grammy-nominated third single from Lupe Fiasco's second studio album Lupe Fiasco's The Cool. It was first presented at the 2007 Lollapalooza in Chicago. The single was officially serviced to radio stations as of April 3, 2008 according to Lupe Fiasco's MySpace blog. The official digital release of the song was on April 12, 2008. It contains a sample of Eumir Deodato's "San Juan Sunset".

The video made its TV premiere when MTV Jams made it the Jam of the Week on June 23, 2008. It also debuted on BET's 106 & Park on July 8, 2008, as the new joint of the day.

The official remix features Pharrell Williams, Q-Tip and fellow record label artist Sarah Green, the song was released September 22, 2008.

== Background ==
Speaking in March 2008 to noted UK urban writer Pete Lewis - Deputy Editor of the award-winning Blues & Soul - Fiasco explained the inspiration behind the song: "I love Paris, I love Tokyo... And what inspired me to write the song was that between 'Food And Liquor' and this album we travelled EVERYWHERE - multiple countries, multiple towns, multiple tours. So I just developed a knack and a love for touring, even if I didn't want to do it! You know, despite the lyrical wear and tear it has on your body - particularly with the different climates - just by force I had to fall in love with it! And of course another side to it all is, when you travel, you leave people behind. So I actually wrote the song for my girl. Because I'd be gone so much we'd go for two months at a time without seeing each other. So it's basically her song. Just to let her know that, wherever I go, she comes with me - even if it is just mentally or in spirit."

== Music video ==
The video (directed by Erik White) was released onto Lupe Fiasco's official YouTube channel at midnight on April 13, 2008.

== Chart positions ==
Chart (2008)	Peak Position
UK Singles Chart	152
