= Daydreamin' (Lupe Fiasco song) =

Single by Lupe Fiasco featuring Jill Scott

from the album Lupe Fiasco's Food & Liquor
- Released: September 11, 2006
- Recorded: 2006
- Genre: Hip hop
- Length: 3:55
- Label: 1st & 15th; Atlantic
- Songwriters: Wasalu Jaco; Sylveer Van Holme; Dave Mackay; Raymond Vincent; Craig Kallman
- Producer: Kallman

Lupe Fiasco singles chronology
"I Gotcha" (2006)	"Daydreamin'" (2006)	"The Emperor's Soundtrack" (2007)

Jill Scott singles chronology
"The Fact Is (I Need You)" (2006)	"Daydreamin'" (2006)	"Hate on Me" (2007)

Audio sample
- file; help

Music video
- "Darydreamin" on YouTube

"Daydreamin'" is the third single taken from Lupe Fiasco's album Lupe Fiasco's Food & Liquor (2006) and features soul singer Jill Scott. The song won Best Urban/Alternative Performance at the 50th Annual Grammy Awards, earning Fiasco his first Grammy and Scott's third.

== Background ==
The single is based on a sample of Daydream in Blue by I Monster (which itself is a cover, the original being written by The Wallace Collection). The song's lyrics depict an adventure being experienced through the eyes of a robot. The song's lyrics are also a critique of pop culture, especially of the current state of hip hop music.

The song was released in the UK and US on September 11, 2006; however, a download-only version was available one week earlier and charted at #46 (without any physical sales).

In 2008 "Daydreamin'" won the Grammy Award for Best Urban/Alternative Performance. It was ranked the best rap song of 2006 by many publications. "Daydreamin'" featured in a 2008 AT&T commercial for a Samsung phone.

In January 2022, Lupe Fiasco revealed that producer & CEO of Atlantic Records Craig Kallman forced the song onto Fiasco's Food and Liquor album "or it wasn't coming out". Fiasco also revealed that he receives no royalties or revenue from the Grammy-winning song.

== Music video ==
A music video was created for the song; it shows Lupe Fiasco at a record store, where he meets and befriends a robot. Jill Scott is shown in a video projected on the wall, singing with a flower in her hair in a manner reminiscent of Billie Holiday.

== Remixes ==
Young Buck did a freestyle remix over the instrumental to this song, and is the first track, featured on G-Unit Radio Pt. 24: The Clean Up Man.

Chamillionaire made a remix on his Mixtape Messiah 7.

== Track listings ==
- CD: 1
1. "Daydreamin'" (featuring Jill Scott)
2. "Kick, Push" (remix) (featuring Pharrell)
- CD: 2
1. "Daydreamin'" (featuring Jill Scott)
2. "Kick, Push" (remix) (featuring Pharrell)
3. "Daydreamin'" (Video)
- 12" Vinyl
1. "Daydreamin'" (radio edit) (featuring Jill Scott)
2. "Daydreamin'" (instrumental)
3. "Daydreamin'" (album version) (featuring Jill Scott)
4. "Theme Music to a Drive-By"

== Charts ==
The song was not a major success on the Billboard charts, but it did begin to pick up steam on the digital download charts, peaking at #26 on the iTunes hip-hop/rap charts and #32 on the Amazon hip-hop/rap charts as of May 1, 2008.

Chart (2006)	Peak position
Australia (ARIA)	40
Denmark Airplay (Tracklisten)	1
Ireland (IRMA)	37
UK Singles (Official Charts)	25
UK Hip Hop/R&B (Official Charts)	11
US Hot R&B/Hip-Hop Songs (Billboard)	63

== Certifications ==
Region	Certification	Certified units/sales
United States (RIAA)	Platinum	1,000,000^{‡}
^{‡} Sales+streaming figures based on certification alone.

== In popular culture ==
A further remixed version is used in the 2016 episode "eps2.0_unm4sk-pt1.tc" in Season 2 of the series Mr. Robot.
