= Kick, Push =

Single by Lupe Fiasco

from the album Lupe Fiasco's Food & Liquor
- Released: April 18, 2006
- Recorded: 2005
- Genre: Hip hop
- Length: 4:15
- Label: 1st & 15th; Atlantic
- Songwriters: Wasalu Jaco; Rudolph Lopez
- Producer: Soundtrakk

Lupe Fiasco singles chronology
"Touch the Sky" (2006)	"Kick, Push" (2006)	"I Gotcha" (2006)

Alternative cover

Music video
- "Kick, Push" on YouTube

"Kick, Push" is the first single released from Lupe Fiasco's debut album, Lupe Fiasco's Food & Liquor. It was written by Lupe Fiasco and Soundtrakk, who also produced the song. It describes a love story between a male and female pair of misfit skateboarders. It has been referred to as "a needle in hip hop's haystack of complacent songs."

Lupe Fiasco has clarified, "...I'm not a skater and I don't want to keep putting on the faces of people who've been skating for 20 years and actually lived out "Kick, Push".

The song's backing track is built around a sample of the instrumental intro of the 1982 song "Bolero Medley" by Filipina singer Celeste Legaspi.

The song appears in video games NBA Live 07, Tony Hawk's Downhill Jam, MLB The Show 25 and Tony Hawk's Pro Skater 3 + 4. Lupe performed this song (among others) live in 2025 as part of the latter game's first-ever THPS Fest in Los Angeles.

The song angered the skateboard community as they didn't like that Lupe Fiasco was portraying to be a skateboarder in the song but didn't even skateboard in the music video except for a jump at the end. Skateboarder Terry Kennedy responded with a diss track titled "Kick Push Pass".

== Awards and accolades ==
"Kick, Push" was nominated for Grammy Awards in 2007 for Best Rap Solo Performance and Best Rap Song. It lost the first to T.I.'s "What You Know", and the second to Ludacris' "Money Maker". It was listed at #15 on Pitchfork Media's "The Top 100 Tracks of 2006" list and was also voted #72 on About.com's Top 100 Rap Songs.

== Remixes and freestyles ==
The official remix of the song features Pharrell, it was included the CD single of his 3rd single, "Daydreamin'".

Drake made his own remix of the song and featured it on his 2006 mixtape Room for Improvement.

Chamillionaire also released a freestyle titled The Greatest on his Mixtape Messiah 4.

Young Buck did a short Remix of the Song on the mixtape RBK Artist Spotlight Vol. 1.

Bassnectar has also released a remix of this song.

== Track listing ==
- CD: 1
1. "Kick, Push"
2. "Tilted" (non-album track)
- CD: 2
1. "Kick, Push"
2. "Spazz Out" (non-album track)
3. "Kick, Push" (MyTone ringtone)
4. "Kick, Push" (Video)
- 12" Vinyl
1. "Kick, Push" (album version)
2. "Kick, Push" (instrumental)
3. "Kick, Push" (a cappella)
4. "Titled" (non-album track)

== Charts ==
Chart (2006)	Peak position
Australia (ARIA)	66
Australian Urban (ARIA)	16
Scotland Singles (OCC)	32
UK Singles (OCC)	27
UK Hip Hop/R&B (OCC)	5
US Billboard Hot 100	78
US Hot R&B/Hip-Hop Songs (Billboard)	56

== Certifications ==
Certification for "Kick, Push"
Region	Certification	Certified units/sales
New Zealand (RMNZ)	Gold	15,000^{‡}
United States (RIAA)	Platinum	1,000,000^{‡}
^{‡} Sales+streaming figures based on certification alone.
