= Matthew Santos =

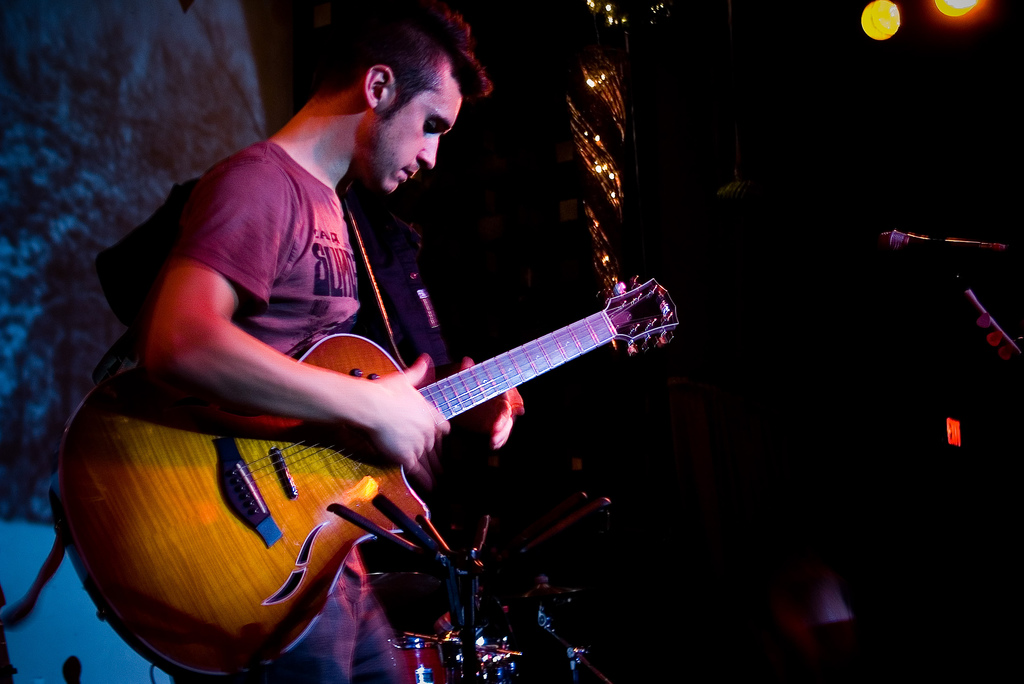
- Santos performing in 2007

Background information
- Born: Matthew Santos; December 28, 1982 (age 43)
- Origin: Minneapolis, Minnesota, U.S.
- Genres: pop; rock; folk; hip hop
- Occupations: Singer; Songwriter; Musician; Composer
- Instruments: Vocals; guitar; piano
- Years active: 2006–present
- Labels: 1st & 15th; Atlantic; CandyRat
- Member of: Monakr
- Website: matthewsantos.com

Matthew Santos is an American two-time Grammy Nominated pop and folk singer-songwriter, musician and composer. He became well known for his collaboration with Chicago rapper Lupe Fiasco on the single "Superstar". He was signed to Lupe Fiasco's 1st & 15th Entertainment record label, a subsidiary of Atlantic Records.

== Biography ==
=== Early years ===
Matthew Santos was born on December 28, 1982, in Minneapolis. He graduated from Southwest High School in Minneapolis. He moved to Chicago in 2001 to study music composition at Columbia College Chicago.

=== Music career ===
Santos released his album Matters of the Bittersweet in November 2007, under indie label Candyrat Records. Following the release of the album, he developed a following surrounding his video performances on YouTube. His five-piece band includes Aviva Jaye (vocals, keyboard), Robert Tucker (drums), Graham Burris (bass), and Matthew Nelson (keyboard).

In 2006, Santos was featured on Lupe Fiasco's Food & Liquor album on the song "American Terrorist." Santos was featured on three additional tracks on Lupe Fiasco's The Cool, released in December 2007; "Superstar", "Streets On Fire", and "Fighters". Santos joined Fiasco on his world tour in 2008, including appearances on MTV's Total Request Live and Spring Break, Jimmy Kimmel Live!, The Ellen DeGeneres Show, The Late Late Show with Craig Ferguson and a debut talk show performance on David Letterman's first live show after the 2007 Writers Guild of America Strike.

In 2007, Santos opened the mtvU Woodie Awards with Lupe Fiasco and performed at the 2008 mtv's Video Music Awards. In addition, Santos performed at Glastonbury Festival, Bonnaroo Festival, the Las Vegas Vegoose Music Festival, Lollapalooza Chicago, South by Southwest, Coachella Valley Music and Arts Festival, Summerfest, and Chicago's Around the Coyote Arts Festival.

In 2009, Santos was featured on the single "Chaconne" by Twin Cities hip hop artist Dessa, a member of Doomtree, from her album A Badly Broken Code. That summer, he was featured in Chicago magazine as one of the city's top singles.

Seeking creative autonomy, Santos stepped away from the mainstream music scene to focus on his own artistic inclinations. In 2010, Santos released the album This Burning Ship of Fools. In 2012, Santos released the album Quickly Disappearing.

He released three more studio albums and became the frontman of the electro-pop band Monakr. The band's success led to a record deal with Embassy of Music and a publishing agreement with Songs Music Publishing (KOBALT). Their music was featured in the film "Love, Simon" and the TV show "Shades of Blue."

In recent years, Santos collaborated with notable artists such as Daveed Diggs, Rafael Casal, Jasmine Cephas-Jones, NGHTMRE, Eryn Allen Kane, and Saba Pivot. He also toured extensively with fellow Minneapolis artist Dessa across Europe, China, and North America, and has begun scoring for film, TV, and movie trailers.

Santos's music has been featured in various shows and films, including "Games People Play," "Sacrifice," "LEGO Masters," "Claim to Fame," "Temptation Island," "The Chi," and "Berlin, I Love You." Additionally, he contributed songs to the Netflix series First Kill, including the singles "Lil' Drop," "Too Late, Too Little," and “Give My Life For You.”

Santos recently composed music for the trailer of the award-winning Netflix movie Rustin.

== Discography ==
=== Albums ===
- As a Crow Flies EP (2006)
- Matters of the Bittersweet (2007, CandyRat Records)
- This Burning Ship of Fools (2010, Love Sick Fool Records)
- Quickly Disappearing (2012, CandyRat Records)
- Into the Further (2015, CandyRat Records)

=== Singles ===
• Burning Up (Come Up Down) (2011)

• Under The Microscope (2015)

• Borrowed Time (2024)

==== Featured singles ====
Year	Song	Chart positions					Certifications	Album
Year	Song	U.S. Hot 100	U.S. Pop 100	U.S. R&B	UK	UK R&B	Certifications	Album
2007	"Superstar" (Lupe Fiasco featuring Matthew Santos)	10	13	19	4	1	RIAA: Platinum; BPI: Gold	Lupe Fiasco's the Cool
2009	"Shining Down" (Lupe Fiasco featuring Matthew Santos)	93	—	—	—	—		Lasers

=== Guest appearances ===
Year	Song	Artist(s)	Album
2006	"American Terrorist"	Lupe Fiasco	Lupe Fiasco's Food & Liquor
2007	"Superstar"	Lupe Fiasco	Lupe Fiasco's The Cool
2007	"Fighters"	Lupe Fiasco	Lupe Fiasco's The Cool
2007	"Streets On Fire"	Lupe Fiasco	Lupe Fiasco's The Cool
2009	"Shining Down"	Lupe Fiasco	Lasers
2010	"The Chaconne"	Dessa	A Badly Broken Code
2016	"Bucket List"	Saba	Bucket List Project
