= Lupe Fiasco =

American rapper and record producer (born 1982)

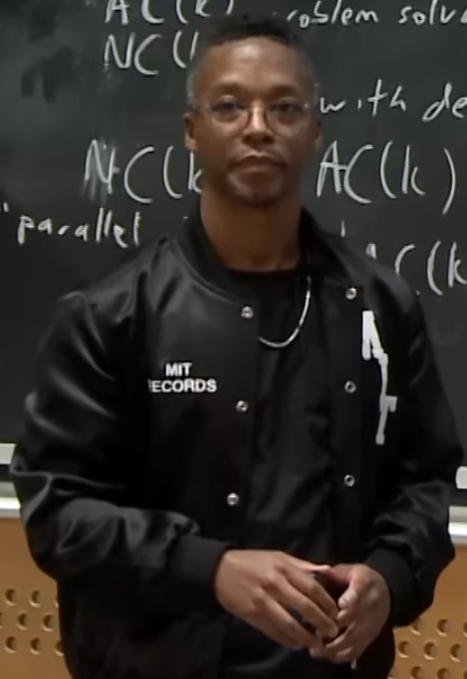
- Lupe Fiasco teaching at MIT in 2022

Background information
- Also known as: Double J
- Born: Wasalu Muhammad Jaco; February 16, 1982 (age 44); Chicago, Illinois, U.S.
- Genre: Midwestern hip-hop
- Occupations: Rapper; singer; songwriter; record producer; educator
- Works: Lupe Fiasco discography
- Years active: 2000–present
- Labels: 1st & 15th; The Orchard; Atlantic; Thirty Tigers
- Member of: Child Rebel Soldier; Japanese Cartoon
- Formerly of: All City Chess Club
- Website: lupefiasco.com

Wasalu Muhammad Jaco (born February 16, 1982), better known by his stage name Lupe Fiasco (/ˈluːpeɪ/ LOO-pay), is an American rapper, singer, record producer and music educator. Born and raised in Chicago, he gained mainstream recognition for his guest appearance on Kanye West's 2006 single "Touch the Sky," which peaked within the top 50 of the Billboard Hot 100. He also formed the rock band Japanese Cartoon in 2008, for which he serves as lead vocalist.

Fiasco developed an interest in hip-hop in his teens, after initially disliking the genre for its use of vulgarity and misogyny. 19-year-old Fiasco adopted his current stage name, began recording songs in his father's basement, and joined a short-lived hip-hop group called Da Pak. During his tenures at two major labels, Fiasco met American rapper Jay-Z, who led him to sign with Atlantic Records. The label released Fiasco's debut studio album, Lupe Fiasco's Food & Liquor (2006), which peaked within the top ten of the Billboard 200 and was nominated for four Grammy Awards. Its first single, "Kick, Push," marked his first entry on the Billboard Hot 100 as a lead artist, while its third, "Daydreamin'" (featuring Jill Scott), won Best Urban/Alternative Performance at the 50th Annual Grammy Awards.

His second album, Lupe Fiasco's The Cool (2007), was met with continued acclaim and preceded by his first Billboard Hot 100-top 40 hit, "Superstar" (featuring Matthew Santos). After a two-year delay, his third album, Lasers (2011), yielded his furthest commercial success—becoming his first to debut atop the Billboard 200—although critical reception was mixed. Its lead single, "The Show Goes On," peaked at number nine on the Billboard Hot 100 and remains his highest-charting song. His fourth album, Food & Liquor II: The Great American Rap Album Pt. 1 (2012), debuted within the top five of the Billboard 200, while his fifth, Tetsuo & Youth (2015), saw a critical rebound, and served as his final release with Atlantic. He then founded the record label 1st & 15th Entertainment to independently release his subsequent albums: Drogas Light (2017), Drogas Wave (2018), Drill Music in Zion (2022) and Samurai (2024).

In addition to music, Fiasco has pursued other business ventures, including fashion. He runs two clothing lines—Righteous Kung-Fu and Trilly & Truly—and has designed footwear for Reebok. He has been involved with charitable endeavors, including the Summit on the Summit expedition, and in 2010, he recorded a benefit single for victims of the 2010 Haiti earthquake. In 2025, he joined Johns Hopkins University as a Distinguished Visiting Professor for the school's Bachelor of Music degree program. Fiasco is also noted for his anti-establishment views, which he has expressed in both interviews and his music.

== Life and career ==
=== 1982–1999: Early life ===
I grew up in the hood around prostitutes, drug dealers, killers, and gangbangers, but I also grew up juxtaposed: On the doorknob outside of our apartment, there was blood from some guy who got shot; but inside, there was National Geographic magazines and encyclopedias and a little library bookshelf situation. And we didn't have cable, so we didn't have the luxury of having our brains washed by MTV. We watched public television – cooking shows and stuff like that.

— Fiasco, on his childhood.

Fiasco was born Wasalu Muhammad Jaco on February 16, 1982, in Chicago, Illinois. Fiasco is one of nine children of Shirley, a chef, and Gregory, a veteran of the Army Corps of Engineers. His father, a member of the Black Panther Party, was a prolific African drummer, karate teacher, operating plant engineer, and owner of karate schools and army surplus stores. Fiasco was raised Muslim on the West Side of Chicago on Madison Terrace housing project. At the age of three, he began taking martial arts classes. His parents divorced when he was five, and he went on to live with his mother, but his father still remained an important part of his life. He described his father's influence over the family by saying, "After school, my father would come and get us and take us out into the world—one day, we're listening to N.W.A, the next day we're listening to Ravi Shankar, the next day, he's teaching us how to shoot an AK-47, the next day, we're at karate class, the next day, we're in Chinatown."

In sixth grade, he went to live with his father full-time in Harvey, Illinois. His father lived next door to a crack house and taught Fiasco to use guns to defend himself from drug dealers. Despite his unstable upbringing, Fiasco states that he was well-educated as a child, asserting that his parents exposed him to a diverse array of subjects and that reading was highly encouraged in his household. As a teenager, Fiasco participated in Academic Decathlon competitions. His mother described him by saying, "He was a great spirited child. Smart, a bit complex; he kind of was a loner; he didn't hang with a lot of people...He always had the glasses. Always had a book bag over his shoulder and some type of a writing tablet." Fiasco initially disliked hip-hop for its use of vulgarity, and preferred to listen to jazz; he idolized clarinet player Benny Goodman. His struggle to learn to play an instrument led him to create poetry instead, which led to his interest in the lyrical aspects of music.

He began rapping his poems in the eighth grade, and upon hearing Nas' 1996 album, It Was Written, he began to pursue hip-hop. While attending Thornton Township High School, Fiasco met gang member Bishop G. The two became friends due to their shared interest in music. Fiasco's father allowed him and Bishop to make mixtapes in his basement, and the two gained notoriety at the school for their music. However, they were kicked off stage during their first performance because their eclectic musical style was not embraced by the hip-hop community. Early in his career, he went by stage names Little Lu and Lu tha Underdog. Growing up, Fiasco was given the nickname "Lu," the last part of his first name, by his mother. "Lupe" is an extension of this nickname, which he borrowed from a friend from high school. "Fiasco" is a reference to The Firm song "Firm Fiasco." The rapper "liked the way it looked on paper." He also said of his name, "You know how rappers always have names like MC Terrorist—like they're 'terrorizing' other rappers? I knew fiasco meant a great disaster or something like that, but I didn't realize that the person named Fiasco would be the disaster, and that you should be calling other MCs fiascos—not yourself...it kind of humbled me in a sense. It taught me like, 'Yo, stop rushing, or you're going to have some fiascos.'"

=== 2000–2005: Career beginnings ===
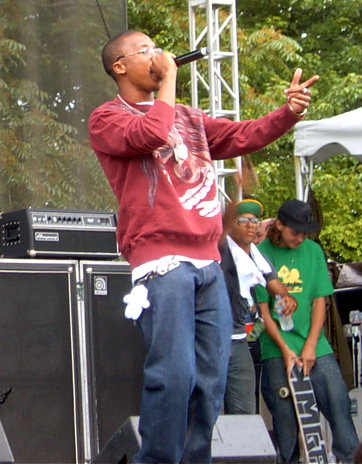
Lupe Fiasco performing at the Intonation Music Festival, 2006.

When Fiasco was 18, he began creating music as a solo artist in his father's basement, even though his parents were not keen on having their son be a rapper. He scoured flea markets and secondhand stores, where he was able to find an old mixing board and a record player, stacks of vinyl records, and mic stands. At age 19, Fiasco joined a group called Da Pak, which was influenced by other California gangsta rappers such as Spice 1 and Ice Cube. Da Pak signed to Epic Records and released one single before splitting up. Fiasco later described the experience, saying "We had a song out about cocaine, guns, and women, and I would go to a record store and look at it and think, 'What are you doing?' I felt like a hypocrite. I was acting like this rapper who would never be judged, and I had to destroy that guy. Because what Lupe Fiasco says on this microphone is going to come back to Wasalu Jaco. When the music cuts off, you have to go home and live with what you say."

After turning away from gangsta rap, he developed a greater appreciation of the lyricism of Jay Z and Nas. His mother also gave him a record of the influential group The Watts Prophets, one of the first bands to use spoken words with music. Although he was without a group for the first time, Fiasco continued to record music. One of these first self-recorded tracks was "Could Have Been", which described the career options he could have pursued had he not begun rapping. He viewed the song as a turning point in his career that marked a drastic change in the subject matter of his music. "Could Have Been" was released as a demo tape and discovered by MTV despite the fact that no video was created for the song.

Fiasco later signed a solo deal with Arista Records, but was dropped when president and CEO L.A. Reid was fired. During his short tenure at Arista, he met Jay-Z, who was the president of Def Jam Recordings at the time. Jay-Z referred to him as a "breath of fresh air", saying that he reminded him of a younger version of himself. Jay-Z later helped him get a record deal at Atlantic Records. While Fiasco was working on his debut solo album, he released his mixtape series Fahrenheit 1/15 over the internet, which gained notoriety by word-of-mouth.

He remixed Kanye West's song, "Diamonds from Sierra Leone," renaming the new version as "Conflict Diamonds". With this remix, Fiasco wished to raise awareness of the conflict diamond business. This caught West's attention, and he asked Fiasco to perform on the song "Touch the Sky" for West's album Late Registration. The song, which sampled Curtis Mayfield's "Move On Up," became a hit in the Billboard Hot 100, peaking at number forty-two. After this success, Fiasco's first single "Kick, Push" was released earlier than expected. The song was a love story about two people sharing a passion for skateboarding, a topic generally not discussed in hip-hop. Fiasco explained, "[Skateboarding culture is] just as deep as hip-hop. I'm not the greatest skateboarder, but I'm a damn good rapper, so I made a damn good skateboarding song." The single, and its accompanying music video, helped Fiasco get attention in the hip-hop community, and was later nominated for two 2007 Grammy Awards. During this time, he recorded guest performances on Tha' Rayne's "Kiss Me" and "Didn't You Know" singles, and also on K Foxx's 2004 "This Life."

=== 2006–2008: Lupe Fiasco's Food & Liquor and The Cool ===
Jay Z assisted him in the production of what would become his debut album Lupe Fiasco's Food & Liquor. The title of the album is a reference to 'Food and Liquor' stores common in Chicago. He explains, "The store is where everything is at...Food to me represents growth and progression. You eat food and you get strength. You need it to live. Liquor is not a necessity; it is a want. It destroys you. It breaks you down. I can see why it's prohibited in Islam...I've always felt like liquor represents the bad, the food represents the good, and everyone is made up of a little of both." Lupe Fiasco's Food & Liquor was officially released on September 19, 2006. The album featured production from Jay-Z, Kanye West, Mike Shinoda, The Neptunes, Prolyfic, among others. The record spawned the singles "Kick, Push", "I Gotcha" and "Daydreamin'" featuring Jill Scott. The critically lauded album was later nominated for three Grammy Awards including Best Rap Album. Fiasco won "Best Urban/Alternative Performance" for "Daydreamin'." In the same year, he was voted by GQ magazine as the "Breakout Man of the Year." He also received four BET Hip Hop Award nominations, and it made it to number eight on the Billboard 200 and number two on the Billboard Top R&B/Hip-Hop Albums chart. That same year he participated in the first Cypher at the BET Hip Hop Awards.

It was a lot of tragedy coming into this album. In the midst of a lot of success, I was so busy I didn't have time to properly mourn. Talking to yourself, having some therapy with yourself – it was the hardest record to write because of the emotions.

— Lupe Fiasco, on Lupe Fiasco's The Cool

In 2007, Fiasco announced his second album, Lupe Fiasco's The Cool, a concept album that expands on the story of the track of the same name on his first album. While recording this album, Fiasco's father died of type II diabetes and his business partner, Charles "Chilly" Patton, was convicted of attempting to supply heroin to a drug ring and was eventually sentenced to 44 years in a correctional facility. These events greatly affected Fiasco and the subsequent themes discussed on the record. The disc was released in December 2007 in United States while the first single and video from the album, "Superstar" featuring Matthew Santos was released the first week of November 2007. Lupe Fiasco's The Cool, a concept album that expanded upon recurring themes in Food & Liquor, is about "a hustler who dies and comes back to life, only to get robbed by two little kids with the same gun that killed him." Fiasco decided not to work with well-known producers for the album since he considered it to be "too expensive," noting the commercial failure of his Pharrell collaboration, "I Gotcha."

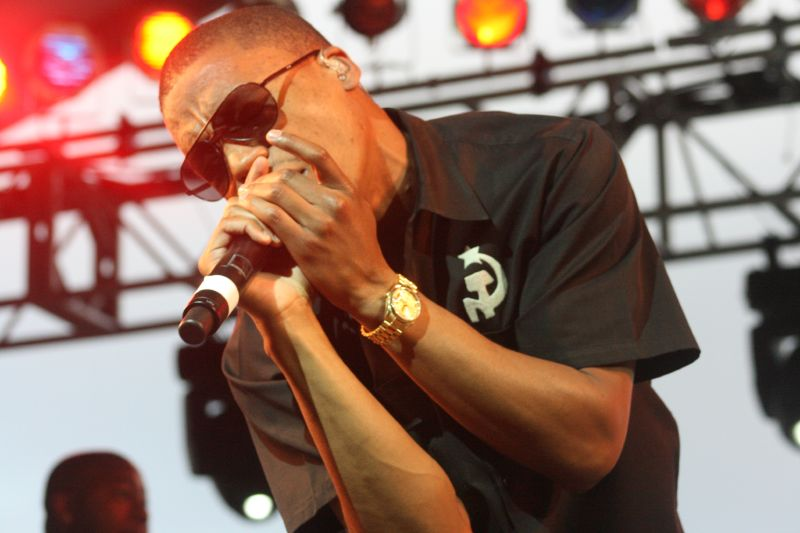
Fiasco performing in Commerce City, Colorado, on July 19, 2008.

Lupe Fiasco's The Cool was very well received by critics and was referred to as "one of the year's best hip-hop albums" by The New York Times. "Superstar," a semi-autobiographical account of his rise to fame, was released as the first single from the album, and peaked at number 10 on the Billboard Hot 100. Baseball's Hanley Ramírez, Troy Tulowitzki, Ryan Zimmerman, Gerald Laird and Ryan Braun have used "Superstar" as their at-bat song. The album's second single (released in the UK in April 2008) was "Paris, Tokyo" – a song based around Fiasco's experiences of touring the world between his first and second albums. Moreover, in 2007 it was revealed that Fiasco, Kanye West and Pharrell Williams had formed a group called Child Rebel Soldier. CRS initially released one single, entitled "US Placers" and featuring a Thom Yorke sample. In an interview with The Village Voice, Fiasco revealed that he was writing a novel about a window washer, aptly titled Reflections of a Window Washer. In 2008, Fiasco and his band 1500 or Nothin joined Kanye West's Glow in the Dark Tour which also featured Rihanna and N.E.R.D. The tour stopped in several cities, including his hometown of Chicago. In 2008, MTV named Fiasco the 7th Hottest MC in the Game and announced that he was remixing The Cool with French electro house act Justice.

=== 2009–2011: Lasers ===
All City Chess Club
- Genres: Experimental hip-hop; hipster hop
- Years active: 2010–2015
- Labels: 1st & 15th
- Past members: Asher Roth; B.o.B; Blu; Charles Hamilton; The Cool Kids; Diggy; Doseage; Jermaine Cole; Lupe Fiasco; Pharrell Williams; Wale

At a performance in New Zealand in February 2010, Fiasco performed new material from the then-titled We Are Lasers for the first time. He claimed that the album was complete and waiting for a release date from his label, Atlantic Records. However, Atlantic feared that the record lacked commercial singles, and presented Fiasco with songs the label wanted him to record. Fiasco declined, as he was told he would not have any ownership of the songs. He explained, "I don't think the label cares about an album...People just want their number-one record." For six months, the cause of the album's delay remained unclear to the public. In response, Fiasco's fans created an online petition demanding that Atlantic Records release Lasers. The petition garnered considerable attention on hip-hop blog sites as well as over 16,000 signatures. Fiasco stated that the petition "brought [him] to tears," and in response to the petition, Fiasco released a song titled "B.M.F-Building Minds Faster" to thank his fans.

While waiting for Lasers to be released, Fiasco completed another album, titled Food & Liquor II: The Great American Rap Album. He was unsure if the Food and Liquor II would ever be released, though he released the song "Go To Sleep" from the record "out of desperation" to put out new music. He also pursued numerous side projects in the midst of the delay. In April 2010, Fiasco formed the hip-hop collective All City Chess Club along with Pharrell, Asher Roth, B.o.B, The Cool Kids, Charles Hamilton, Blu, Diggy Simmons, Wale, J. Cole, & Dosage. The group has so far made one song, a remix of Fiasco's "I'm Beamin." Additionally, On July 16, 2010, Fiasco released his rock side-project Japanese Cartoon's debut EP In The Jaws of the Lords of Death. Japanese Cartoon was influenced by a variety of musical genres, with Fiasco saying, "I've always been a fan of all music...Hip hop is just something I actually know how to do but I always had aspirations to participate in other forms of music. Once I got to create some hip hop, it was like, 'Okay, what am I going to do now?' So my artistic side was like, 'Yo, let's do some rock music.'"

More than two and a half years after the album's completion, Lasers was released on March 8, 2011. The first single from the record was "The Show Goes On", which samples "Float On" by Modest Mouse. "The Show Goes On" debuted at number 57 on the Billboard Hot 100. The lead single peaked at number 9 since then. The producers involved on the album include Alex Da Kidd, King David "The Future" and Jerry "Wonda" Duplessis, while featured artists include Skylar Grey, Trey Songz, and John Legend. Upon the album's release, Lasers debuted at number one on the Billboard 200 chart, with first-week sales of 204,000 copies. Despite the album's commercial success, Lasers received mixed reviews from most music critics. Writing for AllMusic, editor Andy Kellman gave the record three out of five stars and criticized its "lumbering, overwrought choruses", writing that "If there is one MC whose rhymes should not be dulled for the sake of chasing pop trends, it's Lupe Fiasco". Lasers, however, was nominated Best Rap Album, with "The Show Goes On" nominated for Best Rap Performance, and Best Rap Song at the 2012 Grammy Awards. Lupe Fiasco later involved himself at the Occupy Wall Street movement where he donated tents and released a poem in support of the protesters. He also released his "Friend of the People: I Fight Evil" mixtape on Thanksgiving Day.

=== 2012–2013: Food & Liquor II: The Great American Rap Album ===
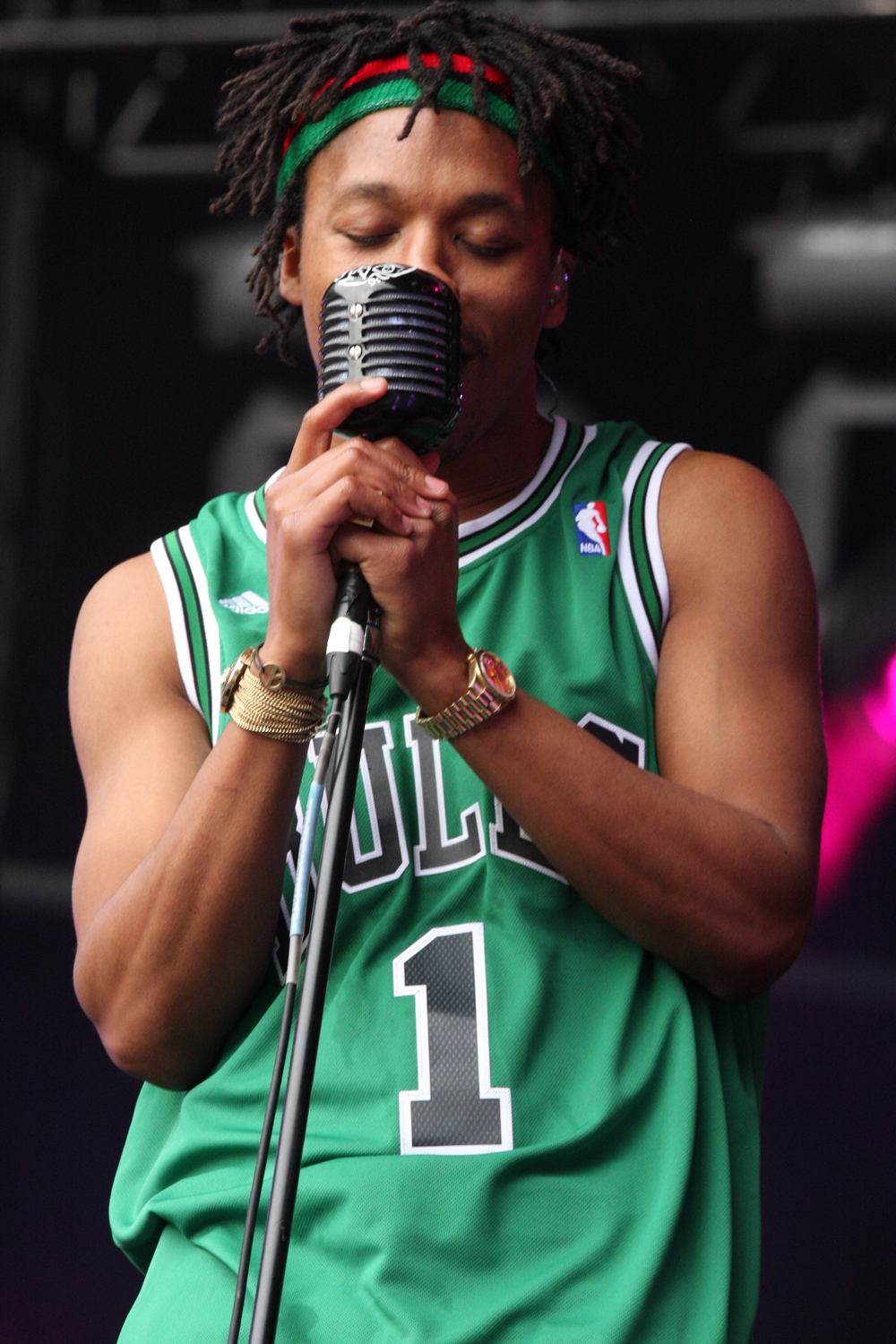
Fiasco performing at Supafest 2012

Fiasco subsequently released Food & Liquor 2, as well as put work into a joint album with fellow Child Rebel Soldier & All City Chess Club member Pharrell. Prior to the album's release, he revealed that there would be no more mixtapes after "Friend Of The People: I Fight Evil" prior to Food & Liquor II: The Great American Rap Album, which was planned to be a double-disc with Part I set to release in fall 2012. Its lead single, the Simonsayz and B-Side produced track Around My Way (Freedom Ain't Free), was released on May 21, which stirred controversy from an infuriated Pete Rock for using a sample from They Reminisce Over You (T.R.O.Y.). Rock said that he felt "so violated" by the use of the sample, although the original track itself used samples from Tom Scott and James Brown.

In 2012, Fiasco also collaborated with Australian singer Guy Sebastian on the single "Battle Scars". The single was recorded in Sebastian's Sydney studio when Fiasco was in Australia for Supafest, and is featured on Sebastian's album Armageddon. It debuted at number one in Australia in its first week, becoming Fiasco's first number one single. On 21 August it was announced "Battle Scars" would be included on Fiasco's fourth album, Food & Liquor II: The Great American Rap Album Pt. 1, and was released as the fourth single in the United States on 28 August 2012. It reached number 71 on the Billboard Hot 100 Chart, number 23 on the Billboard Digital Song Chart and number one on the R&B/Hip-Hop Digital Song Chart. The song spent 20 nonconsecutive weeks in the Billboard Hot 100, and reached platinum certification. "Battle Scars" spent six weeks at number one in Australia, and has been certified 9× platinum by ARIA. It also reached number two and double platinum in New Zealand and number two in Norway.

Food & Liquor II: The Great American Rap Album Pt. 1 was released on September 25, 2012. The songs "Go to Sleep" and "Bitch Bad" were also released as singles. The album received generally positive reviews from contemporary music critics. At Metacritic, which assigns a normalized rating out of 100 to reviews from mainstream critics, the album received an average score of 70, which indicates "generally favorable reviews", based on 18 reviews. It was also nominated for Best Rap Album at the 55th Grammy Awards. Originally, the album was set to be released as a double-disc album, but Atlantic Records did not allow this arrangement, so the album was divided into two. It was confirmed that a Part 2 will be released in Spring 2013. Lupe has said the album showcases more of his dexterity and lyrical substance. S1 has confirmed to be producing on the album. On January 17, 2013, he canceled the plan for the release of the second part of the original double disk. He then said that he would release another studio album in 2013.

=== 2013–2015: Tetsuo & Youth ===
On February 10, 2013, on the red carpet for the Grammy Awards he announced his fifth studio album would be titled Tetsuo & Youth. Since then, he has released songs that are not slated to be on Tetsuo & Youth. These songs are "Light Blue" and "Jonylah Forever." Upon hearing her name in Lupe's song Form Follows Function, Imogen Heap reached out to Lupe on Twitter to give a thank you which led to Fiasco asking her to appear on his next album making her a possible guest artist on Tetsuo and Youth. On August 4, 2013, Lupe Fiasco revealed a new song would be released on September 11, titled "Peace of Paper/Cup of Jayzus."

On August 24, 2013, Fiasco revealed the first song from Tetsuo & Youth, "Crack," featuring Chris Brown. Then on October 3, 2013, Fiasco announced the Tetsuo & Youth Preview tour to take place between November 2 and December 15, 2013. The tour featuring label-mate Stalley as a supporting act, and The Boy Illinois as an opening act. He also revealed the album Tetsuo & Youth would be released in early 2014, but was later postponed to 2015. On October 14, 2013, Fiasco released the first supposed song from the album, "Old School Love," featuring singer Ed Sheeran. Then on October 21, 2013, Fiasco revealed that Big K.R.I.T. and Rick Ross would also be featured on the album.

On May 19, 2014, Fiasco released the first promotional single before the announcement of the album's track list. "Mission" is a track to empower those facing cancer, revere cancer survivors, and remember those who have passed due to cancer-related illnesses," he explains. He has teamed up with Stand Up to Cancer as a celebrity ambassador. Together, they are planning collaborations tied to the track that will be unveiled the same year. On June 24, 2014, Fiasco released a second promotional single titled "Next to It" which features Ty Dolla Sign on the hook.

Most recently due to the Ferguson riots of 2014, Lupe Fiasco has ended up on Twitter feuds with fellow rappers Azealia Banks and Kid Cudi. The feud between Kid Cudi and Lupe Fiasco has not been resolved and has reportedly become worse, with Lupe Fiasco making threats on MTV.

On August 29, 2015, Lupe surprised fans with a new free mixtape, entitled Pharaoh Height, featuring six new tracks that carry Egyptian-themed titles with cuts like "Valleys," "Kings," and "Pyramid."

=== 2016–2018: Drogas Light and Drogas Wave ===
In April 2016, Fiasco announced that he would release a final three albums (Drogas, Skulls, and Roy), later becoming Drogas, Drogas Light, and Skulls, but in October 2016, he announced he wouldn't release those albums between October and January and past 2017 would release new music.

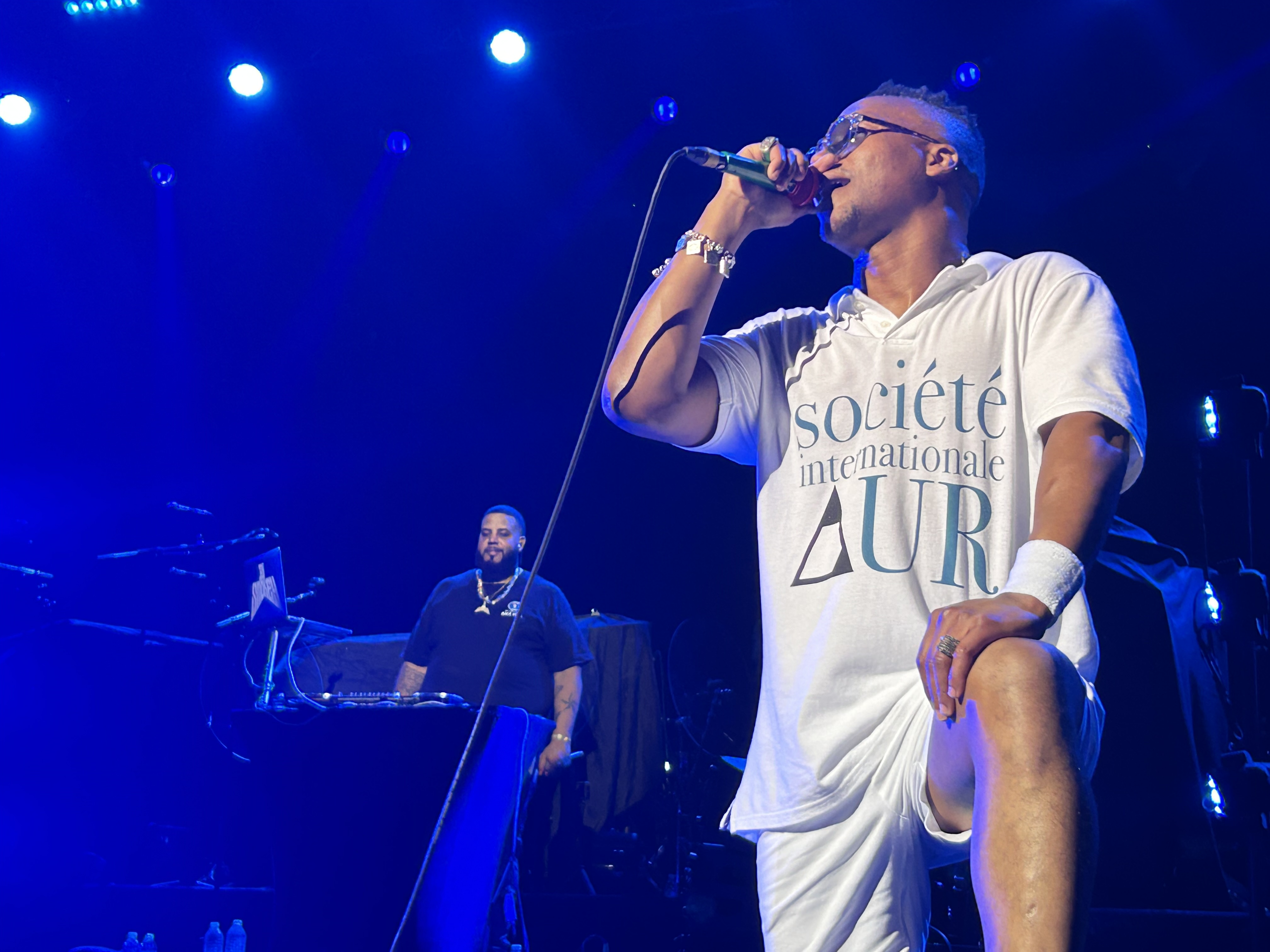
Lupe Fiasco performing at Ovation Hall in Atlantic City, July 22, 2023.

On December 12, 2016, Lupe released his "N.E.R.D" freestyle (named after the funk rock duo of that name and over the instrumental to J. Cole's "Everybody Dies"), which included the line "Artist gettin' robbed for their publishing/By dirty Jewish execs that think his alms from the covenant." Brian "DJ Z" Zisook of hip-hop website DJBooth, who is Jewish, wrote an editorial denouncing that line for its alleged anti-Semitism. After "N.E.R.D" was apparently removed by SoundCloud for "hate speech," Lupe ultimately tweeted that he saw the situation as a sign from God to retire from music for good, announcing the cancellation of Drogas, Drogas Light and Skulls. However, he announced DROGAS light would be released on 10 February 2017. The new album will be distributed through the record label Thirty Tigers.

In March 2018, Fiasco premiered a three-part television documentary called Beat N Path where he embarked on a journey around China to follow his passion for martial arts. This documentary is a tribute to his late father who was a grand master and ran a martial arts school in Chicago. His experiences will help him write his next single called "Air China". The documentary aired exclusively on KIX in Southeast Asia.

On September 13, 2018, Fiasco announced that Drogas Wave will be released on September 21, 2018. The album is the second part of a planned trilogy of albums, with Drogas Light as its predecessor followed by Skulls.

=== 2022–present: Drill Music in Zion and Samurai ===
Fiasco released Drill Music in Zion on June 24, 2022, through 1st & 15th Too and Thirty Tigers. It was preceded by two singles, "Autoboto" and "Drill Music in Zion". On 9 December 2022, Fiasco was featured on Aesop Rock's song "Pumpkin Seeds", produced by Blockhead. The song is a fundraiser for the Collaboratory, an organization promoting two local DIY skateparks in Dayton, Ohio.

On 28 April 2023, Fiasco released the song "SentRock" in collaboration with the Chicago visual artist SentRock. The song was written and produced by Fiasco, while SentRock painted a piece with references to the song's lyrics.

Fiasco released Samurai on June 28, 2024, through 1st & 15th Too and Thirty Tigers. It was preceded by two singles, "Samurai" and "Cake". Samurai is a concept album dedicated to the life and legacy of neo-soul singer Amy Winehouse.

He is scheduled to embark on the North American Back To Basics Tour with Gym Class Heroes and B.o.B in 2026.

== Artistry ==
=== Influences ===
Fiasco's influence include Nas, Jay Z, Common, AZ, De La Soul, N.W.A, Mos Def, Pharrell Williams, A Tribe Called Quest, Q-Tip, Linkin Park and Gang Starr.

=== Lyrical style ===
Fiasco, along with rappers Common, Mos Def and Talib Kweli, has been credited as a pioneer of the conscious hip-hop movement, which focuses on social issues. Subjects touched upon on Lupe Fiasco's Food & Liquor include absent parents, terrorism, Islam and religion, war, and prostitution. Fiasco attributes his interest in social issues to his highly cultured upbringing, as he describes his mother as "very intellectual" and his father as a "Renaissance man." He rejects the misogyny common in hip-hop, which he discusses in the song "Hurt Me Soul." Despite this, Fiasco is opposed to censorship in music, saying "If we're going to [censor things] that are offensive, then we are going to have to blind and deafen everyone. Come on, man. Let's focus on education and literacy and poverty."

Fiasco employs various lyrical techniques in his songwriting. The rapper views hip-hop as a medium conducive to storytelling—a primary element of his lyrics—due to his background in theater. He wrote plays as a child, which had a strong influence on his songwriting. Fiasco utilizes both metaphors and literal statements in his work, which he describes as "getting from point A to point B in as few words as possible." His use of metaphors is exemplified by the song "Gotta Eat" from Lupe Fiasco's The Cool, which is told from the perspective of a cheeseburger and addresses the poor nutrition in black communities in the United States, while using a continuous metaphor of drug dealing and hustling.

== Philanthropy and business ventures ==
In 2001, Fiasco co-founded 1st & 15th Entertainment with Charles "Chilly" Patton. 1st & 15th is an independent record label separate from Atlantic Records named after the traditional twice-monthly paycheck dates. Although his albums are released by Atlantic since he is under contract with it, most of his works are usually produced by 1st & 15th and its in-house producers. Although Fiasco was initially to serve as vice-president, he became CEO after Patton was convicted on drug charges. Fiasco and singer Matthew Santos were two of the most recognizable signed artists. In November 2009, Fiasco announced he would discontinue the 1st & 15th label: "It was just such a 'this isn't right for you right now. This isn't gonna work for you right now. You need to be focused on you. Do you really want that, do you really have the capacity to do it?'" In March 2013, Fiasco took to Twitter to announce that he had become the Creative Director at Higi, a scoring system based in the Chicago area that helps you to discover more about yourself so you can look, live and feel better.

In 2005, he founded Righteous Kung-Fu, a company that designs fashions, sneakers, toys, video games, comic books, and graphics for album covers and skateboard decks. Fiasco also runs a fashion line out of Righteous Kung-Fu called Trilly & Truly. He has sponsored a skateboard team and has endorsements from DGK Skateboards. In January 2006, Fiasco signed with major footwear and apparel corporation Reebok, becoming part of the "O.G" marketing campaign where rap artists such as Lil Wayne and Mike Jones designed their own personal colorway of the Reebok "O.G" model.

In 2009, Fiasco performed in The People Speak, a documentary feature film that employs musical performances of the letters, diaries, and speeches of everyday Americans, based on historian Howard Zinn's A People's History of the United States. On January 7, 2010, Fiasco joined musician Kenna, actress Jessica Biel, and other celebrities and activists for an expedition to the top of Mount Kilimanjaro called Summit on the Summit to raise awareness of the billions of people worldwide who lack access to sanitary drinking water. On January 20, 2010, Fiasco released a track called "Resurrection" with Kenna in response to the 2010 Haiti earthquake. The song, part of a compilation released through the charity Music for Relief, aimed to encourage donations for immediate relief and long-term recovery following the disaster.

Between 2020 and 2023, Fiasco has been a visiting scholar and artist at the Massachusetts Institute of Technology, which he taught the class "Rap Theory and Practice". He often collaborates with Professor of Digital Media Nick Montfort. In January 2025, Fiasco became a visiting scholar at Johns Hopkins University's Peabody Institute.

== Personal life ==
=== Hobbies ===
Lupe Fiasco is an avid gamer and likes to play the Street Fighter series of fighting games. Fiasco scored an upset in an exhibition match of Street Fighter V against professional player Daigo Umehara in 2016, defeating him 3–2 while using Ken.

During a 2008 interview with methodshop, Fiasco revealed that he has "a black belt in karate, two black belts in the styles of samurai sword fighting, kendo and aido" as well as "the equivalent of a black belt in Chinese wushu." He also once revealed on Facebook that his family is "three generations deep in the martial arts" and they have 5 Karate schools in Chicago.

=== Religion ===
...I'm not like the poster boy for Islam... I still got my flaws and stuff like that, so I don't really wear that on my sleeve... I don't go to clubs, I don't drink, I don't smoke, you know like my whole – the whole groupie situation is shut down.

— Fiasco, on his faith.

Lupe Fiasco has stated on MTV's Rap Fix, as well as in various other media, that he is Muslim and that Islam "plays a part in my life and everything I do, to a certain extent... I don't like putting my religion out there, I don't like wearing it like that, because I don't want people to look at me as the poster child for Islam. I'm not. I don't want them to look at my flaws and be like, 'oh, that's the flaws of Islam.'" His mixtape series Fahrenheit 1/15 featured a remix of Kanye West's "Jesus Walks" entitled "Muhammad Walks," which was popularized in the Muslim community. He can be heard using Islamic recitals in "Hurt Me Soul," "Little Weapon," "Hi-Definition," as well as the intro and outro tracks to Lupe Fiasco's Food & Liquor. Fiasco has endorsed the idea that Islam will some day "be the world's religion and conquer the world."

=== Political views ===
In an interview with Stephen Colbert on the satirical news show The Colbert Report, Fiasco described his political philosophy, saying "You should criticize power even if you agree with it." In another interview in June 2011 on the CBS program What's Trending, Fiasco discussed the political content of his music, stating:

"To me, the biggest terrorist is Obama and the United States of America. I'm trying to fight the terrorism that's actually causing the other forms of terrorism. You know, the root cause of terrorism is the stuff the U.S. government allows to happen. The foreign policies that we have in place in different countries that inspire people to become terrorists."

Fiasco additionally criticized Obama for his stance on the Israeli–Palestinian conflict. During Obama's second presidential inauguration on January 20, 2013, Fiasco was removed from the stage by security after performing a 30-minute version of "Words I Never Said," which contains anti-Obama lyrics. In June 2015, Lupe Fiasco wrote an open letter about white supremacy.

Fiasco says he did not vote in U.S. elections until 2018. He said on Twitter that he changed his stance due to the racial views of Donald Trump, and that he would vote for Democratic candidates. However, in 2023, he implied on Twitter that he still had never voted, and endorsed Cornel West's 2024 presidential campaign, saying it would be the "first and last time" he would vote. He actively supports and encourages voting and political participation for his fans across his various social media platforms.

=== Visual arts ===
Having done the artwork for Tetsuo & Youth, Drogas Wave and Drill Music in Zion, Fiasco has also spoken on his interest in visual arts via interviews and his infamous Instagram Lives, specifically in photography, acrylic painting, chiaroscuro and pencil drawing.

On October 11, 2020, via his official Instagram account, Fiasco shared that he had held his first art exhibition at SOHO House Chicago. On October 15, 2022, he shared images via his official Twitter account of an alleged soon to be released graphic novel themed around the Atlantic Slave Trade titled Longchains.

== Discography ==
- Lupe Fiasco's Food & Liquor (2006)
- Lupe Fiasco's The Cool (2007)
- Lasers (2011)
- Food & Liquor II: The Great American Rap Album Pt. 1 (2012)
- Tetsuo & Youth (2015)
- Drogas Light (2017)
- Drogas Wave (2018)
- Drill Music in Zion (2022)
- Samurai (2024)

== Filmography ==
=== Television ===
Year	Title	Role	Notes
2017	Rock 'n' Roll Guns for Hire: The Story of the Sidemen	Himself	Interviewed for documentary
2018	Beat N Path	Himself	3 episodes; also executive producer
2018	Empire	Himself	Cameo

== Awards ==
In 2006, Lupe was named one of GQ's Men of the Year along with being awarded one Grammy in 2008 along with 12 nominations. He has been nominated for numerous other awards and has also been awarded the Character Approved Award for a Musician by the USA Network in 2009.
