= Lupe Fiasco discography =

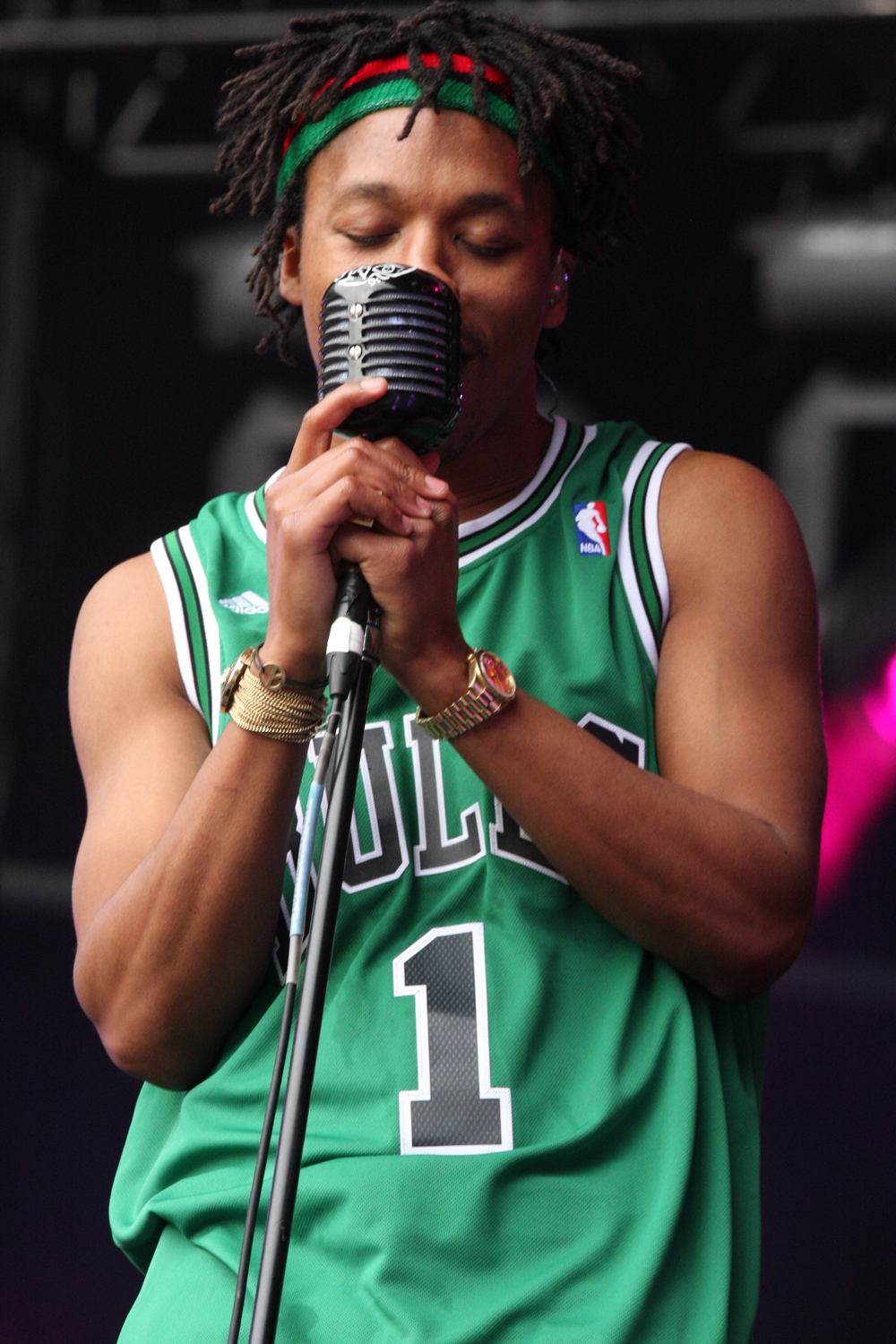
- Lupe Fiasco performing at Supafest 2012
- Studio albums: 9
- Extended plays: 3
- Singles: 38
- Music videos: 37
- Mixtapes: 5

American rapper Lupe Fiasco has released nine studio albums, three EPs, seven mixtapes, 38 singles (including 10 as a featured artist), and 37 music videos.

Fiasco has made music with a number of hip hop artists including Kanye West ("Touch the Sky"), Snoop Dogg ("Hi-Definition"), Pharrell Williams ("I Gotcha"), Jay-Z ("Pressure"), Double, Joy Denalane and Dan the Automator. He has also made music with musicians outside of the hip hop genre, such as Blake Lewis and Patrick Stump.

His debut album, Lupe Fiasco's Food & Liquor, was released in 2006. His second album, Lupe Fiasco's The Cool was his first album to be given an RIAA certification, being certified Gold in April 2008 and eventually reaching Platinum status in October 2022. Lupe Fiasco's The Cool has also spurred his first top 10 single, "Superstar". The song was also certified platinum by the RIAA. Both of his first two albums have been met with positive feedback, with several critics labeling his debut as a masterpiece. Some critics have also stated Lupe Fiasco's The Cool as an even greater followup.

His third studio album, Lasers, was released on March 8, 2011, and debuted at number one on the US Billboard 200, making it his first number one album on the chart as well as his highest debut sales, with over 200,000 albums sold the first week. Lasers has also been certified Gold. The lead single for the album, "The Show Goes On" has been his most successful single to date, reaching the top 10, and has been certified 2× Platinum by the RIAA two years after "Superstar". Despite the commercial success, Lasers was met with mixed reviews from music critics. In 2012, he released his fourth studio album Food & Liquor II: The Great American Rap Album Pt. 1 and was promoted by four singles including "Battle Scars", which went platinum by the RIAA. The album was met with positive reviews. In 2015, he released his fifth studio album Tetsuo & Youth after being delayed several times. It debuted at number 14 on the charts and was met with critical acclaim from music critics and was ranked in many year-end lists.

== Studio albums ==
List of albums, with selected chart positions, sales figures and certifications
Title	Album details	Peak chart positions										Certifications	Sales
Title	Album details	US	US R&B	US Rap	AUS	CAN	FRA	IRE	NL	SWI	UK	Certifications	Sales
Lupe Fiasco's Food & Liquor	Released: September 19, 2006; Label: 1st & 15th, Atlantic; Format: CD, LP, digital download	8	2	1	70	—	172	81	74	—	31	RIAA: Gold; BPI: Silver	US: 375,000 (as of 2021)
Lupe Fiasco's The Cool	Released: December 18, 2007; Label: 1st & 15th, Atlantic; Format: CD, LP, digital download	14	4	1	42	—	129	24	—	93	7	RIAA: Platinum; BPI: Silver	US: 549,000 (as of 2022)
Lasers	Released: March 8, 2011; Label: 1st & 15th, Atlantic; Format: CD, LP, digital download	1	1	1	4	4	145	27	52	—	25	RIAA: Platinum; RMNZ: Gold	US: 520,000 (as of 2014)
Food & Liquor II: The Great American Rap Album Pt. 1	Released: September 25, 2012; Label: 1st & 15th, Atlantic; Format: CD, digital download	5	1	1	17	13	—	—	—	—	60	RIAA: Gold	US: 188,000 (as of 2021)
Tetsuo & Youth	Released: January 20, 2015; Label: 1st & 15th, Atlantic; Format: CD, LP, digital download	14	2	2	69	15	—	—	—	—	58		US: 79,000 (as of 2015)
Drogas Light	Released: February 10, 2017; Label: 1st & 15th, Thirty Tigers, RED, Sony; Format: CD, LP, digital download	28	11	7	—	46	—	—	—	—	—		US: 14,416 (as of 2017)
Drogas Wave	Released: September 21, 2018; Label: 1st & 15th, Thirty Tigers; Format: CD, LP, digital download	60	33	—	—^{[H]}	—	—	—	—	—	—		US: 11,099 (as of 2018)
Drill Music in Zion	Released: June 24, 2022; Label: 1st & 15th, Thirty Tigers; Format: CD, LP, digital download	—	—	—	—	—	—	—	—	—	—		
Samurai	Released: June 28, 2024; Label: 1st & 15th, Thirty Tigers; Format: CD, LP, digital download	—	—	—	—	—	—	—	—	—	—		
"—" denotes a recording that did not chart or was not released in that territory.

== EPs ==
List of EPs, with year released
Title	EP details
House (with Kaelin Ellis)	Released: July 24, 2020; Label: 1st and 15th, Thirty Tigers; Format: Digital download, streaming
Tape Tape (with Soundtrakk)	Released: October 2, 2020; Label: 1st and 15th, Thirty Tigers; Format: Digital download, streaming
Ghotiing	Released: April 18, 2025; Label: Self-released; Format: Streaming

== Mixtapes ==
List of mixtapes, with year released
Title	Album details
Fahrenheit 1/15 Part I: The Truth Is Among Us	Released: 2005; Label: Self-released; Format: CD, Digital download
Fahrenheit 1/15 Part II: Revenge of the Nerds	Released: 2005; Label: Self-released; Format: CD, Digital download
Fahrenheit 1/15 Part III: A Rhyming Ape	Released: 2005; Label: Self-released; Format: CD, Digital download
Enemy of the State: A Love Story	Released: November 26, 2009; Label: Self-released; Format: Digital download
Friend of the People: I Fight Evil	Released: November 24, 2011; Label: Self-released; Format: Digital download
Lost in the Atlantic	Released: September 29, 2013; Label: Self-released; Format: Digital download
Pharaoh Height 2/30	Released: August 29, 2015; Label: Self-released; Format: Digital download
Rhymen Shop	Released: TBA; Label: Self-released; Format: Digital download

== Singles ==
=== As lead artist ===
List of singles, with selected chart positions and certifications, showing year released and album name
Title	Year	Peak chart positions										Certifications	Album
Title	Year	US	US R&B	US Rap	AUS	CAN	GER	IRE	NZ	NOR	UK	Certifications	Album
"Kick, Push"	2006	78	56	—	66	—	—	47	—	—	27	RIAA: Platinum; RMNZ: Gold	Lupe Fiasco's Food & Liquor
"I Gotcha"	2006	—	86	—	—	—	—	—	—	—	—		Lupe Fiasco's Food & Liquor
"Daydreamin'" (featuring Jill Scott)	2006	—	63	—	40	—	—	38	—	—	25	RIAA: Platinum	Lupe Fiasco's Food & Liquor
"Superstar" (featuring Matthew Santos)	2007	10	19	3	32	46	39	3	—	—	4	RIAA: 3× Platinum; BPI: Gold; RMNZ: Gold	Lupe Fiasco's The Cool
"Hip-Hop Saved My Life"^{[A]} (featuring Nikki Jean)	2008	—	120	—	—	—	—	—	—	—	—	RIAA: Gold	Lupe Fiasco's The Cool
"Paris, Tokyo"	2008	—	—	—	—	—	—	—	—	—	152		Lupe Fiasco's The Cool
"The Show Goes On"	2010	9	45	4	5	19	—	19	18	—	49	RIAA: 7× Platinum; ARIA: 2× Platinum; RMNZ: 2× Platinum	Lasers
"Words I Never Said" (featuring Skylar Grey)	2011	89	—	—	—	—	—	—	—	—	—	RIAA: Gold	Lasers
"Out of My Head" (featuring Trey Songz)	2011	40	11	4	52	—	—	—	—	—	—	RIAA: Gold	Lasers
"Around My Way (Freedom Ain't Free)"	2012	76	—	—	58	—	—	—	—	—	—		Food & Liquor II: The Great American Rap Album Pt. 1
"Bitch Bad"	2012	—^{[B]}	62	—	—	—	—	—	—	—	—		Food & Liquor II: The Great American Rap Album Pt. 1
"Lamborghini Angels"	2012	92	—	—	—	—	—	—	—	—	—		Food & Liquor II: The Great American Rap Album Pt. 1
"Battle Scars" (with Guy Sebastian)	2012	71	20	14	1	—	—	—	2	2	—	RIAA: 3× Platinum; ARIA: 13× Platinum; BPI: Silver; GLF: Gold; RMNZ: 3× Platinum	Food & Liquor II: The Great American Rap Album Pt. 1
"Old School Love" (featuring Ed Sheeran)	2013	93	31	23	23	—	—	—	17	—	—	RIAA: Gold; ARIA: Platinum; RMNZ: Gold	Non-album single
"Deliver"	2014	—	—	—	—	—	—	—	—	—	—		Tetsuo & Youth
"Madonna (And Other Mothers in the Hood)" (featuring Nikki Jean)	2014	—	—	—	—	—	—	—	—	—	—		Tetsuo & Youth
"Adoration of the Magi" (featuring Crystal Torres)	2015	—	—	—	—	—	—	—	—	—	—		Tetsuo & Youth
"Countdown" (with Consequence featuring Chris Turner)	2015	—	—	—	—	—	—	—	—	—	—		Non-album single
"Pick Up the Phone"	2016	—	—	—	—	—	—	—	—	—	—		Drogas Light
"Made in the USA" (featuring Bianca Sings)	2016	—	—	—	—	—	—	—	—	—	—		Drogas Light
"Wild Child" (featuring Jake Torrey)	2017	—	—	—	—	—	—	—	—	—	—		Drogas Light
"Jump" (featuring Gizzle)	2017	—	—	—	—	—	—	—	—	—	—		Drogas Light
"Tranquillo" (featuring Rick Ross and Big K.R.I.T.)	2017	—	—	—	—	—	—	—	—	—	—		Drogas Light
"Shoes" (with Kaelin Ellis featuring Virgil Abloh)	2020	—	—	—	—	—	—	—	—	—	—		House
"100 Chicagos"	2022	—	—	—	—	—	—	—	—	—	—		Non-album single
"Autoboto"	2022	—	—	—	—	—	—	—	—	—	—		Drill Music in Zion
"Drill Music in Zion"	2022	—	—	—	—	—	—	—	—	—	—		Drill Music in Zion
"Galveston"^{[I]}	2022	—	—	—	—	—	—	—	—	—	—		Juneteenth 2022: Freedom Songs
"SentRock"	2023	—	—	—	—	—	—	—	—	—	—		Non-album single
"Samurai"	2024	—	—	—	—	—	—	—	—	—	—		Samurai
"Cake"	2024	—	—	—	—	—	—	—	—	—	—		Samurai
"—" denotes a recording that did not chart or was not released in that territory.

=== As featured artist ===
List of singles, with selected chart positions, showing year released and album name
Title	Year	Peak chart positions								Certifications	Album
Title	Year	US	US R&B	US Rap	AUS	GER	IRE	NZ	UK	Certifications	Album
"Touch the Sky" (Kanye West featuring Lupe Fiasco)	2006	42	23	10	10	97	14	16	6	RIAA: Platinum; BPI: 2× Platinum; RMNZ: Platinum	Late Registration
"Change" (Joy Denalane featuring Lupe Fiasco)	2006	—	—	—	—	—	—	—	—		Born & Raised
"We All Want the Same Thing" (Kevin Michael featuring Lupe Fiasco)	2007	—	—	—	—	—	—	—	—		Kevin Michael
"This City" (Patrick Stump featuring Lupe Fiasco)	2011	—^{[C]}	—	—	—	—	—	—	—		Soul Punk
"I'm On" (Trae featuring Wiz Khalifa, Lupe Fiasco, Wale, Big Boi and MDMA)	2011	—	—	—	—	—	—	—	—		Street King
"Angels & Stars" (Eric Turner featuring Lupe Fiasco and Tinie Tempah)	2012	—	—	—	—	—	—	—	—		Eric Turner: The Life
"Vava Voom" (Bassnectar featuring Lupe Fiasco)	2012	—	—	—	—	—	—	—	—		Vava Voom
"Poor Decisions" (Wale featuring Lupe Fiasco and Rick Ross)	2013	—	59	—	—	—	—	—	—		Self Made Vol. 3
"Makin' Papers" (Chuckie featuring Lupe Fiasco, Too $hort and Snow tha Product)	2013	—	—	—	—	—	—	—	—		Non-album single
"Linger" (Guy Sebastian featuring Lupe Fiasco)	2014	—	—	—	17	—	—	—	—	ARIA: Gold	Madness
"Mr. Clean" (Nikki Jean featuring Lupe Fiasco)	2018	—	—	—	—	—	—	—	—		Beautiful Prison
"Rómpelo" (Cimafunk featuring Lupe Fiasco)	2021	—	—	—	—	—	—	—	—		El Alimento
"Big Blue (MURO's KG Remix Part 2)" (Shakkazombie featuring Lupe Fiasco)	2022	—	—	—	—	—	—	—	—		Non-album singles
"Pumpkin Seeds" (Aesop Rock and Blockhead featuring Lupe Fiasco)	2022	—	—	—	—	—	—	—	—		Non-album singles
"Wax On Wax Off" (Awich featuring Lupe Fiasco & FERG)	2025										Non-album single
"—" denotes a recording that did not chart or was not released in that territory.

=== Promotional singles ===
List of singles, with selected chart positions, showing year released and album name
Title	Year	Peak chart positions			Album
Title	Year	US	US R&B	AUS	Album
"The Emperor's Soundtrack"	2007	—	—	—	Lupe Fiasco's Food & Liquor
"Dumb It Down" (featuring GemStones and Graham Burris)	2007	—	—	—	Lupe Fiasco's The Cool
"Shining Down" (featuring Matthew Santos)	2009	93	—	88	Lasers
"I'm Beamin'"	2010	—^{[D]}	97	—	Lasers
"Mission"	2014	—	—	—	Non-album singles
"Next to It" (featuring Ty Dolla Sign)	2014	—	52	—	Non-album singles
"Remission" (featuring Jennifer Hudson & Common)	2014	—	—	—	Non-album singles
"Lilies" (featuring Sirah)	2014	—	—	—	Lost in the Atlantic
"Pu$$y" (featuring Billy Blue)	2014	—	—	—	Lost in the Atlantic
"Haile Selassie" (featuring Nikki Jean)	2014	—	—	—	Lost in the Atlantic
"Mazinger" (featuring PJ)	2014	—	—	—	Lost in the Atlantic
"Coulda Been"	2017	—	—	—	Non-album single
"Run Game"	2019	—	—	—	Chill's Spotlight
"Air China"	2019	—	—	—	Beat N Path
"Hey Lupe"	2019	—	—	—	Chill's Spotlight
"—" denotes a recording that did not chart or was not released in that territory.

== Other charted songs ==
List of singles, with selected chart positions, showing year released and album name
Title	Year	Peak chart positions			Album
Title	Year	US	AUS	CAN	Album
"Beautiful Lasers (2 Ways)" (featuring MDMA)	2011	70	—	—	Lasers
"Letting Go" (featuring Sarah Green)	2011	—^{[E]}	—	—	Lasers
"Till I Get There"	2011	—^{[F]}	—	—	Lasers
"I Don't Wanna Care Right Now" (featuring MDMA)	2011	—^{[G]}	71	78	Lasers
"—" denotes a recording that did not chart or was not released in that territory.

== Guest appearances ==
List of non-single guest appearances, with other performing artists, showing year released and album name
Title	Year	Other artist(s)	Album
"Kiss Me"	2002	Tha' Rayne	—N/a
"Life"	2003	K-Fox	—N/a
"Didn't You Know" (Remix)	2003	Tha' Rayne, Joe Budden	—N/a
"Spraypaint & Inkpens"	2005	Fort Minor, Ghostface	Fort Minor: We Major
"Be Somebody"	2005	Fort Minor, Holly Brook, Tak	The Rising Tied
"Catch Me"	2006	Dan the Automator, Evidence	Dan the Automator Presents 2K7
"Ain't No"	2006	Shayla G	Chevy Musick
"I Keep It Gutter Like" (Remix)	2006	Stack Bundles	—N/a
"Touch the Sky" (Live)	2006	Kanye West	Late Orchestration
"Candy"	2007	GemStones	My Block: Chicago
"Up to Me"	2007	Kev Samples	The Rush
"City Wings"	2007	Big-O, DJ Watarai	Straight to Next Door
"Run Away Love"	2007	DOUBLE	Reflex
"Can You Let Me Know"	2007	DJ Deckstream, Verbal, Sarah Green	Deckstream Soundtracks
"Sifer"	2007	Styles P, Papoose, Lupe Fiasco	Independence
"Know My Name"	2007	Blake Lewis	A.D.D. (Audio Day Dream)
"Walk in My Shoes"	2007	Emily King	East Side Story
"This Ain't a Scene, It's an Arms Race" (Remix)	2007	Fall Out Boy, Kanye West, Travis McCoy, Paul Wall, Skinhead Rob, Tyga, Lil Wayne	Infinity on High
"Say Goodbye to Love" (Remix)	2007	Kenna	Make Sure They See My Face
"B.U.D.D.Y." (Remix)	2007	Musiq Soulchild	Luvanmusiq
"We On"	2008	GemStones, Poo Bear	The Testimony of GemStones: Fahrenheit 1/15 Vol. 6
"Everyone Nose (All the Girls Standing in the Line for the Bathroom)" (Remix)	2008	N.E.R.D., Kanye West, Pusha T	Seeing Sounds
"Slow Down"	2008	Eva	In the Beginning
"Swang on Em"	2008	Bun B	II Trill
""Forever" (Remix)	2008	Chris Brown, Lil Wayne	Exclusive: The Forever Edition
"Fast Car" (Fugee Remix)	2008	Wyclef Jean	Carnival Vol. II: Memoirs of an Immigrant
"Cruisin"	2008	Ace Mac, Raheem DeVaughn	—N/a
"Mastered"	2008	A-Trak	Running Man: Nike+ Original Run
"Poppin Off"	2009	Wildstyle	Natural Disaster
"Can't Hold Me Down"	2009	Euro P, DMG	—N/a
"Girlfriend"	2009	Chris Brown	Graffiti
"Official Dope Boyz"	2009	DJ Greg Street, Wale, Kardinal Offishall	Sertified Worldwide
"Past My Shades"	2010	B.o.B	B.o.B Presents: The Adventures of Bobby Ray
"Bad Don't Seem So Wrong"	2010	Trae tha Truth	Can't Ban Tha Truth
"Oh Yeah"	2010	Diggy Simmons, Pharrell	Airborne
"Just the Way You Are" (Remix)	2010	Bruno Mars	Doo-Wops & Hooligans
"Don't Look Down"	2010	Kanye West, Mos Def, Big Sean	G.O.O.D. Fridays
"AM/FM"	2010	Young Buck	Back on My Buck Shit Vol. 2: Change of Plans
""Tightrope" (Wondamix)	2010	Janelle Monáe, B.o.B	The ArchAndroid (Suites II and III)
"Dirty Rose"	2010	Sarah Green	—N/a
"Flashback"	2010	Jack Splash	Technology and Love Might Save Us All
"The Runaway: Lupe’s Revenge"	2010	Unkle Reconstruction	The Answer EP
"Girls"	2011	The Prodigy	Always Outnumbered, Never Outgunned
"What U Want" (Chad Hugo Remix)	2011	Missile Command, Kenna	Foolcast #22
"Cupcakin"	2011	MDMA	—N/a
"If You Want To"	2011	Travis Barker, Pharrell	Give the Drummer Some
"Flying High!"	2011	Honors English, TL Cross	The Honors English Project (Chapter 1)
"Wait for Me"	2011	Big Sean	Finally Famous: The Album
"Million Star Motel"	2011	Nikki Jean, Black Thought	Pennies in a Jar
"Hold Me Down"	2011	Euro P, J. Mike, GQ	—N/a
"Say Yeah"	2011	Jay Sean	The Mistress
"My Turn"	2011	Glasses Malone, Kam, LaToiya Williams, Wyclef Jean	Beach Cruiser
"Zombie Land"	2011	L.E.P. Bogus Boys	Now or Neva
"Still Speedin' (Reloaded)"	2011	Sway	The Deliverance
"Always Shine"	2012	Robert Glasper, Bilal	Black Radio
"Had Enough"	2012	Nu-Centz	—N/a
"Gone"	2012	Mikkey Halsted, Jim Lavigne	—N/a
"Skate On"	2012	Game	California Republic
"Brief Intermission"	2012	Goon Gang Ridahz	—N/a
"Life of a Savage"	2013	RondoNumbaNine	Real Nigga 4 Life
"Driven"	2013	Trae Tha Truth, Poo Bear	I Am King
"World Runners"	2014	Ab-Soul, Nikki Jean	These Days...
"Lost Generation"	2014	Big K.R.I.T.	Cadillactica
"All Day"	2014	Tayo	Alter Ego
"Only the Bulls (Remix)"	2014	Fall Out Boy	n/a
"Say"	2015	PJ	n/a
"No Problems"	2016	J.U.S.T.I.C.E. League, Future	J.U.S.T.I.C.E for all
"Yes Indeed"	2016	Mistah F.A.B., Fashawn	Son of a Pimp Part 2
"Against Us (remix)"	2016	Dee-1, Big K.R.I.T.	Slingshot David (The Mixtape)
"OMW"	2017	Billy Blue	Revelations
"School"	2018	Forever M.C., Talib Kweli, Rozewood, Hus Kingpin	n/a
"HYPERDRIVE"	2018	vØHn	Journey to Pluto
"Dirty Nikes (Remix)"	2021	Ruth B.	Between (Deluxe Special Edition)
"Under the Stars"	2021	Sway	Stay Wild and Young
"The Singularity"	2023	The Legendary Traxster	Chicago
"Peace"	2024	Ab-Soul, Punch	Soul Burger
"Charlie Horse"	2025	Aesop Rock, Homeboy Sandman	Black Hole Superette

== Production discography ==
List of production and songwriting credits (excluding guest appearances, interpolations, and samples)
Track(s)	Year	Credit	Artist(s)	Album
15. "Hello Goodbye/Uncool"	2007	Producer	Lupe Fiasco	Lupe Fiasco's The Cool
3. "Us Placers"	2007	Producer	Child Rebel Soldier	Can't Tell Me Nothing
2. "BLKKK SKKKN HEAD"	2013	Additional producer	Kanye West	Yeezus
4. "Dots & Lines"	2015	Producer (produced with Simon Sayz & Jack LNDN)	Lupe Fiasco	Tetsuo & Youth

== Soundtrack appearances ==
=== Video games ===
Year	Title	Song	Album
2005	Need for Speed: Most Wanted	"Tilted"	Lupe Fiasco's Food & Liquor
2005	NBA Live 06	"Tilted"	Lupe Fiasco's Food & Liquor
2006	NBA Live 07	"Kick, Push"	Lupe Fiasco's Food & Liquor
2006	Tony Hawk's Downhill Jam	"Kick, Push"	Lupe Fiasco's Food & Liquor
2006	Madden NFL 07	"The Instrumental" (featuring Jonah Matranga)	Lupe Fiasco's Food & Liquor
2007	Project Gotham Racing 4	"The Instrumental" (featuring Jonah Matranga)	Lupe Fiasco's Food & Liquor
2008	Lips	"Superstar" (featuring Matthew Santos)	Lupe Fiasco's The Cool
2009	NHL 2K10	"Superstar" (featuring Matthew Santos)	Lupe Fiasco's The Cool
2010	Need for Speed: Hot Pursuit	"Shining Down"	Lasers
2024	Undisputed	"P4P"	—N/a

=== Film ===
Year	Title	Song	Album
2008	Street Kings	"Put You on Game"	Lupe Fiasco's The Cool
2008	Street Kings	"Little Weapon" (featuring Bishop G & Nikki Jean)	Lupe Fiasco's The Cool
2009	New Moon	"Solar Midnite"	The Twilight Saga: New Moon
2011	Fright Night	"Letting Go"	Lasers
2013	G.I. Joe: Retaliation	"Little Weapon" (featuring Bishop G & Nikki Jean)	Lupe Fiasco's The Cool
2015	Creed	"Prisoner 1 & 2" (featuring Ayesha Jaco)	Tetsuo & Youth

== Music videos ==
=== As lead artist ===
List of music videos, with directors, showing year released
Title	Year	Director(s)
"Failure"	2006	Christopher Adams, Hana McDowell
"Kick, Push"	2006	Christopher Adams, Hana McDowell
"I Gotcha"	2006	Kevin Hunter
"Daydreamin'" (featuring Jill Scott)	2006	Syndrome
"He Say She Say"	2007	Christopher Adams, Hana McDowell
"The Emperor's Soundtrack"	2007	Christopher Adams, Hana McDowell
"Superstar" (featuring Matthew Santos)	2007	Hype Williams
"Dumb It Down" (featuring GemStones and Graham Burris)	2007	Gil Green
"Hip Hop Saved My Life" (featuring Nikki Jean)	2008	Dr. Teeth
"Paris, Tokyo"	2008	Erik White
"Solar Midnite"	2009	Mark Staubach
"I'm Beamin"	2010	Shomi Patwary, Illusive Media Inc
"The Show Goes On"	2010	Hiro Murai
"Words I Never Said" (featuring Skylar Grey)	2011	Sanaa Hamri
"Out of My Head" (featuring Trey Songz)	2011	Gil Green
"I Don't Wanna Care Right Now" (featuring MDMA)	2011	—N/a
"Around My Way (Freedom Ain't Free)"	2012	Alex Nazari
"Bitch Bad"	2012	Gil Green
"Lamborghini Angels" / "ITAL (Roses)" / "Audubon Ballroom"	2013	Alex Nazari
"Old School Love" (featuring Ed Sheeran)	2013	Coodie & Chike
"Next to It" (featuring Ty Dolla $ign)	2014	Alex Nazari
"Deliver"	2014	Alex Nazari
"Killers"	2016	Seth Mussey
"Pick Up the Phone"	2016	—N/a
"Jump" (featuring Gizzle)	2017	Djay Brawner
"Made in the USA"	2017	YASHXANA
"Run Game"	2019	Chris & Blaq
"Cripple" (featuring Elena Pinderhughes)	2019	Vann Fulfs
"Hey Lupe"	2019	Tim Westover
"100 Chicagos"	2022	Jhatter
"Autoboto"	2022	Djay Brawner
"Precious Things"	2023	Albert Figurt
"SentRock"	2023	Enstrumental
"Outside"	2023	Milky Made It
"Checkin'"	2023	BuddaDatBoss, ShotbyFlyGuy
"Samurai"	2024	Chris & Blaq
"Cake"	2024	Chris & Blaq
"No.1 Headband"	2024	Chris & Blaq
"Palaces"	2024	Chris & Blaq

=== As featured artist ===
List of music videos, with directors, showing year released
Title	Year	Director(s)
"Change" (Joy Denalane featuring Lupe Fiasco)	2006	Masaki Ohkita
"Touch the Sky" (Kanye West featuring Lupe Fiasco)	2006	Chris Milk
"We On" (GemStones featuring Lupe Fiasco)	2007	—N/a
"Everyone Nose (All the Girls Standing in the Line for the Bathroom)" (Remix) (N.E.R.D. featuring Kanye West, Pusha T and Lupe Fiasco)	2008	Hype Williams
"Resurrection" (Kenna featuring Lupe Fiasco)	2010	Shomi Patwary, Robert Elliott Simmons, Illusive Media Inc
"Tightrope" (Wondamix) (Janelle Monáe featuring B.o.B and Lupe Fiasco)	2010	Wendy Morgan
"We Can Do It Now" (Common featuring Jennifer Hudson, No I.D. and Lupe Fiasco)	2010	—N/a
"Bad Don't Seem So Wrong" (Trae tha Truth featuring Lupe Fiasco)	2010	Jordan Tower
"Packers vs. Bears" (Nick Javas featuring Lupe Fiasco)	2011	—N/a
"This City" (Patrick Stump featuring Lupe Fiasco)	2011	Ken Koller
"Cupcakin" (MDMA featuring Lupe Fiasco)	2011	Raul Conde
"Angels and Stars" (Eric Turner feat. Tinie Tempah & Lupe Fiasco)	2012	
"I'm On" (Trae tha Truth featuring Big Boi, Wale, Wiz Khalifa, MDMA and Lupe Fiasco)	2012	Philly Fly Boy
"Makin' Papers" (Chuckie featuring Lupe Fiasco, Too Short, and Snow Tha Product)	2013	Larentz Tate
"Poor Decisions" (Wale featuring Lupe Fiasco & Rick Ross)	2013	
"Life of a Savage" (RondoNumbaNine featuring Lupe)	2013	
"Linger" (Guy Sebastian featuring Lupe Fiasco)	2015	
"Countdown" (Consequence featuring Chris Turner & Lupe Fiasco)	2015	
"Against Us (Remix)" (Dee-1 featuring Big KRIT & Lupe Fiasco)	2016	
"Wax On Wax Off" (Awich featuring Lupe Fiasco & FERG)	2025	Hideto Hotta

== Notes ==
- A "Hip-Hop Saved My Life" did not enter the Hot R&B/Hip-Hop Songs chart, but peaked at number 20 on the Bubbling Under R&B/Hip-Hop Singles chart, which acts as a 25-song extension to the Hot R&B/Hip-Hop Songs chart.
- B "Bitch Bad" did not enter the Billboard Hot 100, but peaked at number 11 on the Bubbling Under Hot 100 Singles chart, which acts as a 25-song extension to the Hot 100. It did not enter the Hot R&B/Hip-Hop Songs chart, but peaked at number 16 on the Bubbling Under R&B/Hip-Hop Singles chart, which acts as a 25-song extension to the Hot R&B/Hip-Hop Songs chart.
- C "This City" did not enter the Billboard Hot 100, but peaked at number 2 on the Bubbling Under Hot 100 Singles chart, which acts as a 25-song extension to the Hot 100.
- D "I'm Beamin'" did not enter the Billboard Hot 100, but peaked at number 18 on the Bubbling Under Hot 100 Singles chart, which acts as a 25-song extension to the Hot 100.
- E "Letting Go" did not enter the Billboard Hot 100, but peaked at number 6 on the Bubbling Under Hot 100 Singles chart, which acts as a 25-song extension to the Hot 100.
- F "Till I Get There" did not enter the Billboard Hot 100, but peaked at number 10 on the Bubbling Under Hot 100 Singles chart, which acts as a 25-song extension to the Hot 100.
- G "I Don't Wanna Care Right Now" did not enter the Billboard Hot 100, but peaked at number 12 on the Bubbling Under Hot 100 Singles chart, which acts as a 25-song extension to the Hot 100.
- H Drogas Wave did not enter the ARIA Albums Chart, but peaked at number 43 on the ARIA Digital Albums Chart.
- I "Galveston" is an Apple Music exclusive single.
