= 2011 MTV Movie Awards =

American awards show

- Date: Sunday, June 5, 2011
- Location: Gibson Amphitheatre, Universal City, California
- Country: United States
- Hosted by: Jason Sudeikis
- Website: http://www.mtv.com/ontv/movieawards/2011

Television/radio coverage
- Network: MTV, MTV2, VH1, and Logo
- Produced by: Mark Burnett
- Directed by: Joe DeMaio

The 2011 MTV Movie Awards were held on June 5, 2011 at the Gibson Amphitheatre in Universal City, California and were hosted by Jason Sudeikis.

On May 3, the nominees were announced. The Twilight Saga: Eclipse lead the nominations with eight followed by Inception and Harry Potter and the Deathly Hallows – Part 1 with six, The Social Network with five, and Black Swan with four. In addition, Emma Stone won the award for Best Comedic Performance, becoming the second female winner of the award and first one since 2001. The Show included 12 categories, including Best Line From a Movie. Also, WTF Moment was re-titled Best Jaw Dropping Moment, and the Global Superstar category was retired after debuting in the 2010 show.

== Performers ==
- Lupe Fiasco featuring Trey Songz — "Out of My Head"/"The Show Goes On"
- Foo Fighters — "Walk"

== Presenters ==
- Justin Timberlake and Mila Kunis — presented Best Male Performance
- J. J. Abrams, Joel Courtney, Elle Fanning, and Steven Spielberg — presented exclusive clip from Super 8
- Steve Carell, Ryan Gosling, and Emma Stone — presented Best Villain
- Jim Carrey — introduced Foo Fighters
- Chris Evans — presented reminder to vote for Best Movie
- Aziz Ansari, Danny McBride, and Nick Swardson — presented Best Jaw-Dropping Moment
- Shia LaBeouf, Josh Duhamel, Rosie Huntington-Whiteley, and Patrick Dempsey — presented Best Fight
- Blake Lively and Ryan Reynolds — presented Best Kiss
- Emma Watson — presented clip from Harry Potter and the Deathly Hallows: Part 2
- Patrick Dempsey, Robert Pattinson, and Chelsea Handler — presented MTV Generation Award
- Cameron Diaz and Jason Segel — presented Best Line From a Movie
- Ashton Kutcher and Nicki Minaj — presented Best Female Performance
- Selena Gomez, Katie Cassidy, and Leighton Meester — introduced Trey Songz and Lupe Fiasco
- Jason Bateman, Charlie Day, and Jason Sudeikis — presented Best Comedic Performance
- Kristen Stewart, Robert Pattinson, and Taylor Lautner — presented exclusive clip from The Twilight Saga: Breaking Dawn - Part 1
- Gary Busey — presented Best Movie

== Awards ==
Best Movie
The Twilight Saga: Eclipse; Black Swan; Inception; The Social Network; Harry Potter and the Deathly Hallows – Part 1
Best Male Performance	Best Female Performance
Robert Pattinson – The Twilight Saga: Eclipse; Jesse Eisenberg – The Social Network; Zac Efron – Charlie St. Cloud; Daniel Radcliffe – Harry Potter and the Deathly Hallows – Part 1; Taylor Lautner – The Twilight Saga: Eclipse	Kristen Stewart – The Twilight Saga: Eclipse; Emma Stone – Easy A; Emma Watson – Harry Potter and the Deathly Hallows – Part 1; Jennifer Aniston – Just Go with It; Natalie Portman – Black Swan
Best Breakout Star	Best Villain
Chloë Grace Moretz – Kick-Ass; Andrew Garfield – The Social Network; Hailee Steinfeld – True Grit; Olivia Wilde – Tron: Legacy; Xavier Samuel – The Twilight Saga: Eclipse; Jay Chou - The Green Hornet	Tom Felton – Harry Potter and the Deathly Hallows – Part 1; Val Kilmer – MacGruber; Leighton Meester – The Roommate; Mickey Rourke – Iron Man 2; Ned Beatty – Toy Story 3; Christoph Waltz – Green Hornet
Best Comedic Performance	Best Scared-as-S**t Performance
Emma Stone – Easy A; Russell Brand – Get Him To The Greek; Zach Galifianakis - Due Date; Adam Sandler – Just Go With It; Ashton Kutcher – No Strings Attached	Elliot Page (Note: Credited as Ellen Page) – Inception; Jessica Szohr – Piranha 3D; Ashley Bell – The Last Exorcism; Minka Kelly – The Roommate; Ryan Reynolds – Buried
Best Kiss	Best Fight
Robert Pattinson and Kristen Stewart – The Twilight Saga: Eclipse; Emma Watson and Daniel Radcliffe – Harry Potter and the Deathly Hallows – Part 1; Kristen Stewart and Taylor Lautner – The Twilight Saga: Eclipse; Natalie Portman and Mila Kunis – Black Swan; Joseph Gordon-Levitt and Elliot Page – Inception	Robert Pattinson vs. Bryce Dallas Howard and Xavier Samuel – The Twilight Saga: Eclipse; Amy Adams vs. The Sisters (Erica McDermott, Melissa McMeekin, Bianca Hunter, Kate B. O'Brien, Jill Quigg, Dendrie Taylor, and Jenna Lamia) – The Fighter; Chloë Grace Moretz vs. Mark Strong – Kick-Ass; Daniel Radcliffe, Emma Watson, Rupert Grint vs. Rod Hunt and Arden Bajraktaraj – Harry Potter and the Deathly Hallows – Part 1; Joseph Gordon-Levitt vs. Hallway Attacker – Inception
Best Jaw Dropping Moment	Biggest Badass Star
Performance Spectacular – Justin Bieber (from Justin Bieber: Never Say Never); Cuts Off His Own Arm – James Franco (from 127 Hours); Paris Café Explosion Scene – Leonardo DiCaprio and Elliot Page (from Inception); Mutilation: Pulls the Skin Off Her Own Finger – Natalie Portman (from Black Swan); Port-a-Potty Bungee Stunt – Steve-O (from Jackass 3D)	Chloë Grace Moretz; Alex Pettyfer; Jaden Smith; Joseph Gordon-Levitt; Robert Downey Jr.
Best Line From a Movie	Best Latino Actor
"I want to get chocolate wasted!" — Alexys Nycole Sanchez (from Grown Ups); "There's a higher power that will judge you for your indecency." "Tom Cruise?" — Amanda Bynes and Emma Stone (from Easy A); "If you guys were the inventors of Facebook, you'd have invented Facebook." — Jesse Eisenberg (from The Social Network); "...A million dollars isn't cool. You know what's cool?" "You?" "A billion dollars. And that shut everybody up." — Justin Timberlake and Andrew Garfield (from The Social Network); "You mustn't be afraid to dream a little bigger, darling." — Tom Hardy (from Inception)	Alexa Vega – From Prada to Nada; Danny Trejo – Machete; Benjamin Bratt – La Mission; Jennifer Lopez – The Back-up Plan; Zoe Saldaña – The Losers; Rosario Dawson – Unstoppable

=== MTV Generation Award ===
- Reese Witherspoon
