= Us Placers =

Song by Child Rebel Soldier

from the album Can't Tell Me Nothing
- Released: May 27, 2007
- Recorded: 2007
- Genre: Hip hop
- Length: 3:53
- Label: 1st & 15th; GOOD Music; Star Trak
- Songwriters: Wasalu Muhammad Jaco; Kanye West; Pharrell Williams; Thom Yorke
- Producer: Lupe Fiasco

"Us Placers" is the debut song by American supergroup Child Rebel Soldier, a musical collaboration consisting of American hip-hop artists Lupe Fiasco, Kanye West, and Pharrell Williams. It was released as the third song on the track-listing of West's 2007 mixtape Can't Tell Me Nothing. The song was produced by Fiasco and samples the 2006 song "The Eraser" by Thom Yorke. In "Us Placers," the trio speaks on the entrapments of fame. Having been released on a free mixtape, the song did not enter the charts but became an online hit and received strong reviews from music critics.

== Background ==
"Us Placers" was produced by Lupe Fiasco, who initially crafted the song for inclusion within his mixtape. He intended to create a mashup mixtape of the same name, a hip-hop remake of English alternative rock musician Thom Yorke's 2006 solo album The Eraser, along with a few Radiohead songs. Fiasco originally wanted Kanye West, who also deeply enjoyed Yorke's album, and English hip-hop group The Streets to appear on the track. However, the Streets failed to respond while West sent the song over to Pharrell Williams after laying down a verse. The three enjoyed the collaboration so much that they decided to form their very own group. It was Williams who came up with their name, Child Rebel Soldier. According to Fiasco, "It was Pharrell's idea one day in the studio 'cause we're all similar, same likes and same dislikes, same goals and aspirations." Early track listings for West's third studio album Graduation indicated that he intended to feature the group's song on his album, but it was subsequently not included.

== Composition ==
"Us Placers"

"Us Placers" is an up-tempo hip-hop song. It is set in the time signature of common time with a moderate tempo of 120 beats per minute. The song contains samples of Thom Yorke's 2006 song "The Eraser", incorporating its piano loops and a portion of Yorke's vocals for its chorus. It begins with a medium tempo followed by a hesitant piano melody, with Fiasco uttering, "Yeah, just a lil' bit, just a lil' bit. And it goes..." Fiasco, West and Williams, listed in order of appearance, then rap the song's three verses over a sparse, pulsating beat. Each verse is organized around a chorus that is provided by the melodic vocal sample. The chorus is coupled with a harmonic hook delivered by Fiasco, whose vocals implement overdubbing. During the chorus, the song's chord progression changes to and takes on a more moody, atmospheric sound. The song ends with an echoing reiteration of its piano keys.

Lyrically, "Us Placers" is a meditation on the perils of fame. Fiasco's verse depicts the over-indulgent lifestyles of rich and famous celebrities. In a stoic voice, he rapidly raps an extensive list of materialistic possessions, including a large mansion, a wardrobe full of exorbitant clothes, Mexican floral arrangers, a big-screen television, and a fifty-foot yacht. Fiasco brings his verse to a close by making a declaration regarding the emptiness of opulence. West uses his verse to expound the ephemerality of fame. Citing aspiring participants of reality television programs such as The Real World and American Idol and internet celebrities as examples, he implies the fate of those who become instantly famous if only for a short time, in that once their fifteen minutes of fame are over, they then fade away into obscurity, possibly never to enter the public eye ever again. Williams takes a more stream-of-consciousness approach to his verse. He swiftly touches on a series of social issues ranging from greenhouse gases, drug dealers, the will God and troubled youth. Williams concludes his verse by exposing the motive behind the Virginia Tech shooting. He states the irony of the suicidal shooter, in that he finally achieved the fame and recognition he sought in life, but is not alive to see it. After each verse, Yorke's melodious vocals sing a mournful yet defiant chorus that complements the song's concept of the sisyphean pursuit of fame: "The more you try to erase me, the more that I appear."

== Critical reception ==
"Us Placers" received overwhelmingly positive reviews from music critics and was widely regarded as the highlight of the Can't Tell Me Nothing mixtape. Rolling Stone not only cited the song as the best track on the mixtape but also placed it at number forty-three on their list of the 100 Best Songs of 2007. Complimenting the poignant use of the sample as well as the depth of the trio's individual verses, it wrote, "Each brings something wholly new to the other, trading self-effacement and self-possession back and forth until there's no difference between the two. For this 3:53, hip-hop isn't dead, and neither is rock. They're quietly invincible." Thomas Inskeep of Stylus Magazine described "Us Placers" as being both deep and intelligent and praised the dexterity of Williams' verse in particular. Toronto Star columnist John Sakamoto wrote that the recording was a "stunning collaboration." Greg Kot of Chicago Tribune stated that the song was brilliant while Entertainment Weekly called it an "instant Internet classic." Luke Lewis of Q Magazine felt it was a shame that "Us Placers" would not be featured on Fiasco's then-forthcoming sophomore album, Lupe Fiasco's The Cool, as he believed that the song's guest appearances and lyrical content "all adds up to the most atmospheric, and quietly enthralling, hip-hop track we've heard in a long time." Two years later, while reviewing his Enemy of the State: A Love Story mixtape, Allison Stewart from The Washington Post retrospectively referred to "Us Placers" as "the great '07 track" and commended Fiasco's production of the song." At About.com, "Us Placers" was placed at number thirty-two on their list of the Top 100 Rap Songs of 2007 and later at number eighty-three on their 100 Best Rap Songs of the 2000s.

== Music video ==
Though no official music video for "Us Placers" was released, a non-commissioned video was produced by music video director Va$htie. The video features then-ten-year-old child impersonators standing in for Fiasco, West, Williams and Yorke. They lip-sync to and illustrate the song's lyrics and hold up cue cards in reference to Bob Dylan's "Subterranean Homesick Blues". Despite its "zero-budget," unofficial nature, the music video was very well received, garnering well over two million views on YouTube alone. It went on to catch the attention of West, who expressed his affinity for it by posting the video up on his official blog.

== Live performances ==
Fiasco performed "Us Placers" on August 5, 2007 during his set at Lollapalooza, to the delight of the largely alternative rock audience.
