= Child Rebel Soldier =

American hip hop supergroup

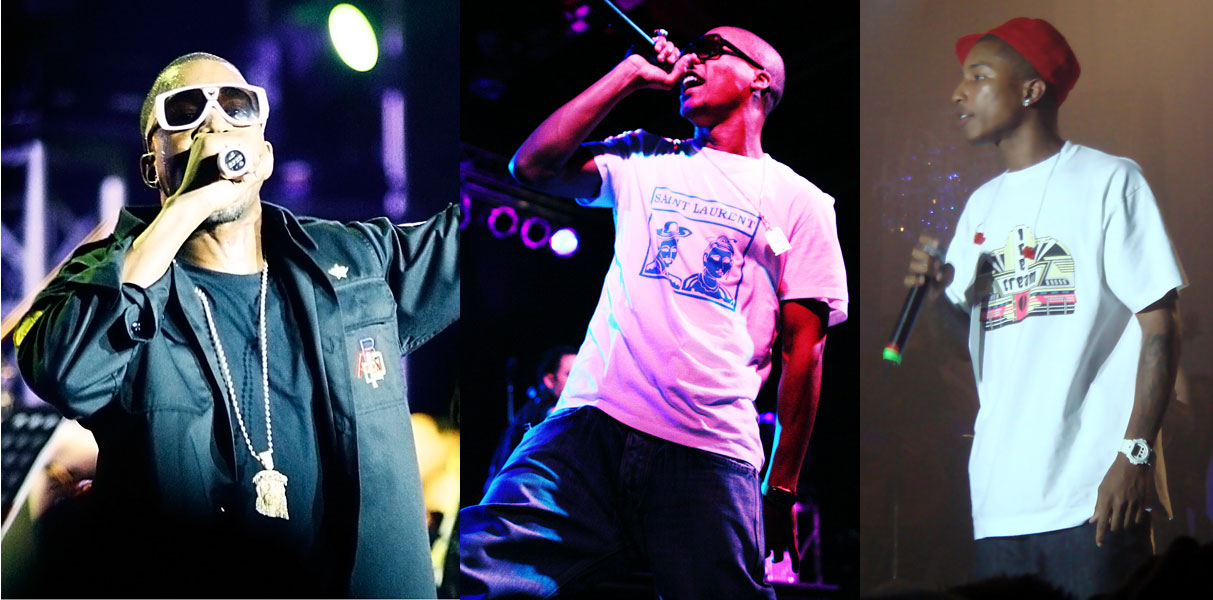
- Left to right: Kanye West, Lupe Fiasco and Pharrell Williams

Background information
- Origin: United States
- Genre: Hip-hop
- Years active: 2007–2013; 2024–present
- Labels: GOOD; 1st & 15th; Star Trak
- Members: Lupe Fiasco
- Past members: Kanye West; Pharrell Williams

Child Rebel Soldier (shortened as CRS) is a hip-hop side project of American rapper Lupe Fiasco. The project was originally a supergroup composed of Lupe (child), Kanye West (rebel), and Pharrell Williams (soldier). Formed in 2007, the trio released two collaborative singles prior to their original disbandment in 2013.

In 2024, Lupe expressed plans to revive the group as a solo side project, where he would strictly rap over Radiohead samples. He released what would be the first Child Rebel Soldier song in almost fourteen years, "Shrink!" on August 14, 2024, via his YouTube channel, sampling the Radiohead song "Optimistic".

== History ==
=== Original inception ===
Child Rebel Soldier was conceived alongside the song "Us Placers", which appears on Kanye West's Can't Tell Me Nothing (2007) mixtape, released just prior to his third studio album Graduation (2007). Lupe Fiasco produced the song in an attempt to construct a mashup mixtape containing hip hop remakes of rock singer Thom Yorke's solo album The Eraser, coupled with a few Radiohead songs. He originally wanted Kanye West and English rapper The Streets (Mike Skinner) to appear on the mixtape's first song "Us Placers", but Skinner failed to respond while West sent the song over to Pharrell Williams after laying down a verse. After finishing the collaboration, the trio decided to form a group, deemed by Pharrell as "Child Rebel Soldier". Their first song, "Us Placers", was listed at number 43 on Rolling Stone's list of the 100 Best Songs of 2007.

In a 2007 interview with Billboard, Fiasco elaborated that the three had hopes to find time to construct a full-length studio album, saying, "Now [our labels are] working it out. Whoever is going to pay is going to pay a whole hell of a lot. Everybody is excited, [but] 'Us Placers' is the only record we have".

On January 29, 2008, it was announced on Kanye West's blog that the three artists would be touring later in the year together. The Glow in the Dark Tour, as it was called, consisted of Kanye West, Rihanna, Lupe Fiasco and Pharrell's funk rock band N.E.R.D.

According to a Lupe Fiasco interview with sohh.com, there were plans for a CRS album in 2010. He said the trio of CRS would have three different elements to it: an album, music videos, and a third element he failed to elaborate on (speculation that what he was referring to at this point was the then unannounced "Glow in the Dark" Tour).

The group was featured on the remix to "Everyone Nose" by N.E.R.D. They were labeled as Child Rebel Soldier on the song instead of their separate entities. This is the second song where they use their group name. The official video for the "Everyone Nose" remix version was posted on Kanye West's blog on August 7, 2008. The video, directed by Hype Williams, features CRS and Pusha T of Clipse. Behind them is a green screen showing scenes from various retro video games, including Donkey Kong, Galaga, and Space Invaders.

With Lupe Fiasco's upcoming album completed and scheduled to be released by Atlantic Records, Kanye West remained the only member currently working on their own solo LP. Despite this, on January 26 Lupe Fiasco announced that the group had finished 4 songs.

The album, which was tentatively titled God Unwilling, had been shelved according to Lupe Fiasco in an interview with Las Vegas radio station Hot 97.5. In the interview he first spoke about his upcoming album, Lasers, and then shot down the supposedly upcoming Child Rebel Soldier with one word when he was questioned – "nope". Lupe offered no further explanation at the time as to why the album had been placed on indefinite hold.

On October 8, 2010, Kanye West released what was thought as a new Child Rebel Soldier track entitled "Don't Stop" as a part of his "GOOD Fridays" releases. However, in an interview, Lupe stated that "Don't Stop" was actually written in 2008.

On October 18, 2010, at the L.A. screening for "Runaway", which was again followed by a rather lengthy Q&A, the subject of CRS was brought up. West explained that the project is on the table and will follow after the release of My Beautiful Dark Twisted Fantasy and collaboration album Watch The Throne with Jay-Z.

On July 25, 2013, in response to an inquiry on Twitter, Lupe Fiasco announced that Child Rebel Soldier has been canceled.

=== As a solo project ===
In July 2024, in an interview with Stereogum, Lupe expressed plans to revive the group as a solo side project, where he would strictly rap over Radiohead samples. The song "Shrink!" would be released a month later on August 14, 2024, via his YouTube channel, which was the first release from the group/project in fourteen years. The song also serves as a rough demo sketch made for the group, and samples the track "Optimistic" from Radiohead's album Kid A (2000). Its title was originally revealed a year prior to the release, when he posted on X that he sent two unreleased CRS songs to Tyler, the Creator – "Shrink!" being one of them.

== Discography ==
=== Singles ===
- 2007: "Us Placers"
- 2007: "Diamonds & Dollars"
- 2010: "Don't Stop!"
- 2024: "Shrink!"

=== Guest appearances ===
- 2008: N.E.R.D. – Seeing Sounds: "Everyone Nose" (remix)
