= Drogas Light =

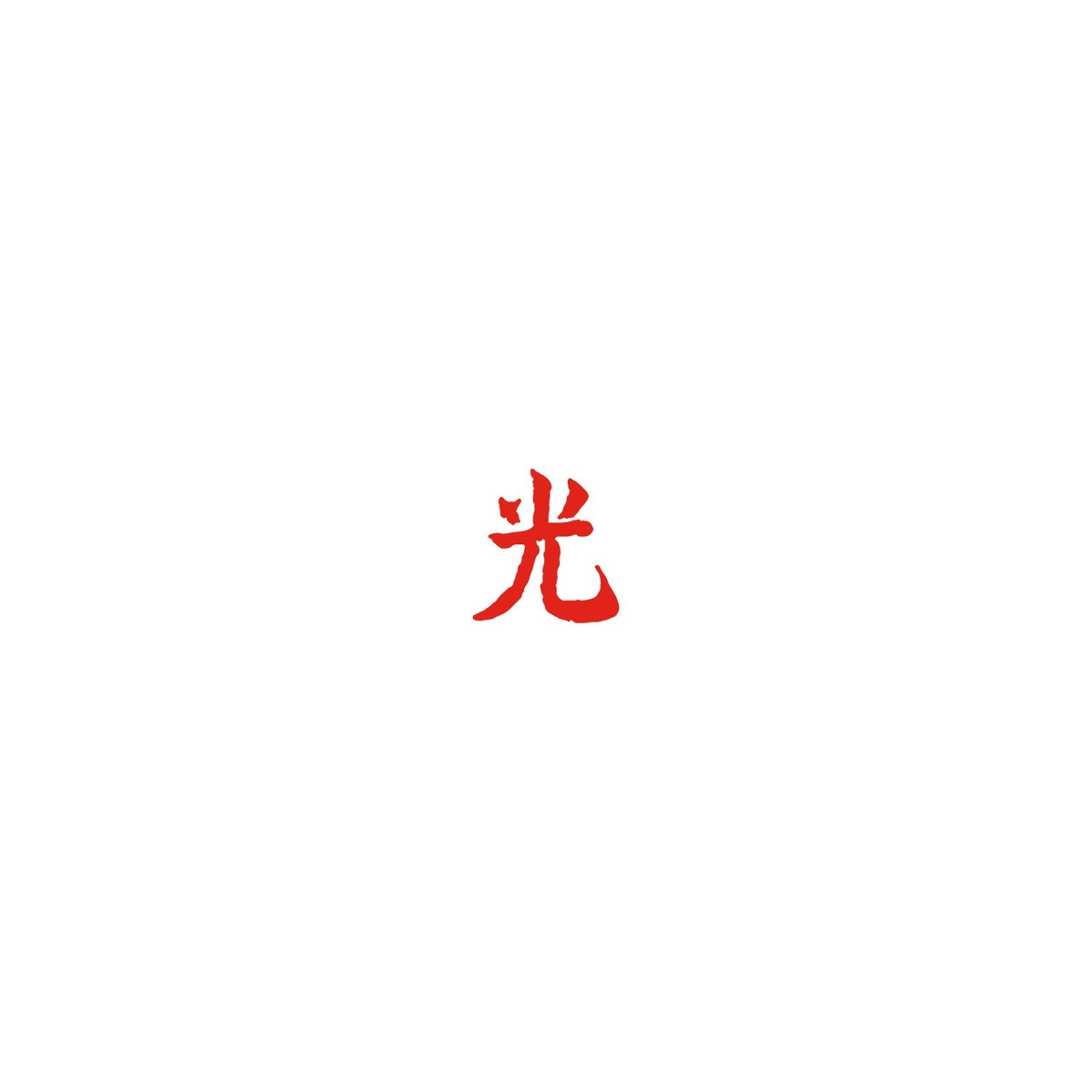

Studio album by Lupe Fiasco
- Released: February 10, 2017
- Recorded: 2014–2016
- Genres: Hip hop; trap
- Length: 60:57
- Labels: 1st & 15; Thirty Tigers
- Producers: Tarik Azzouz; B HAM; B-Sides; Cy Fyre; D'Mile; Floss & Fame; iSHi; Purps; Simonsayz; Soundtrakk; StreetRunner; S-X; Jake Torrey; Ty Dolla $ign

Lupe Fiasco chronology
Tetsuo & Youth (2015)	Drogas Light (2017)	Drogas Wave (2018)

Singles from Drogas Light
- 1. "Pick Up the Phone" Released: July 20, 2016; 2. "Made in the USA" Released: November 17, 2016; 3. "Jump" Released: January 9, 2017

Drogas Light (stylized as DROGAS Light) is the sixth studio album by American rapper Lupe Fiasco, released by 1st and 15th Productions on February 10, 2017. This is also his first album under Thirty Tigers following his departure from Atlantic Records.

== Background ==
Lupe Fiasco announced the album on December 24, 2016, revealing its release date and cover art via Twitter. He confirmed the album's track listing on December 27, which differed from the track listing shared in May 2016.

Fiasco has referred to the project as a "refinement of 'Lasers.' Period". Lupe Fiasco alludes that a lot of the material on DROGAS Light isn't exactly recent. He said it's full of songs "from the vaults" and that there are just "a few new pieces." He reiterates "DROGAS" is coming in the next few months and DROGAS Light is simply the prequel to that project.

The album is part of a planned trilogy of albums, with the following two to be titled Drogas Wave and Skulls.

The album was released February 10 worldwide via digital outlets and physical copies.

The album also marks his first under Thirty Tigers following his departure from record label Atlantic Records.

== Critical reception ==
Professional ratings
Aggregate scores
Source	Rating
AnyDecentMusic?	5.1/10
Metacritic	56/100
Review scores
Source	Rating
AllMusic	3/5 stars
Chicago Tribune	2/4 stars
Evening Standard	3/5 stars
Exclaim!	6/10
The Guardian	3/5 stars
The Observer	2/5 stars
Pitchfork	7.4/10
Rolling Stone	2.5/5 stars
The Skinny	2/5 stars
XXL	3/5

Drogas Light received mixed reviews from critics. At Metacritic, which assigns a normalized rating out of 100 to reviews from mainstream publications, the album received an average score of 56, based on 11 reviews.

== Commercial performance ==
The album debuted at number 28 on the US Billboard 200 for the chart dated March 4, 2017. selling 20,000 copies (including 14,000 in pure album sales) in its first week.

== Track listing ==
Tracklist adapted from AllMusic and iTunes.

No.	Title	Writer(s)	Producer(s)	Length
1.	"Dopamine Lit (Intro)"	Wasalu Jaco; Rudolph Lopez	Soundtrakk	2:49
2.	"NGL" (featuring Ty Dolla $ign)	Jaco; Tyrone Griffin; Sam Gumbley	S-X	4:03
3.	"Promise"	Jaco; Lopez	Soundtrakk	4:32
4.	"Made in the USA" (featuring Bianca Sings)	Jaco; Tarik Azzouz; Clemm Rishad; Nicholas Warwar	StreetRunner; Azzouz	3:30
5.	"Jump" (featuring Gizzle)	Jaco; Lopez; Glenda Proby	Soundtrakk	4:34
6.	"City of the Year" (featuring Rondo)	Jaco; Brendan Long; Clint Massey	B-Sides	3:52
7.	"High (Interlude)" (featuring Simonsayz)	Jaco; Simon Morel	Simonsayz	3:58
8.	"Tranquillo" (featuring Big K.R.I.T. and Rick Ross)	Derrick Disu; James Fatora; Jaco; Justin Scott; William Roberts II	Floss & Fame	5:10
9.	"Kill" (featuring Ty Dolla $ign and Victoria Monét)	Griffin; Dernst Emile II; Jaco; Victoria McCants	D'Mile; Ty Dolla $ign	7:10
10.	"Law" (featuring Simonsayz)	Disu; Fatora; Jaco; Morel	Floss & Fame	5:26
11.	"Pick Up the Phone"	Jaco; Sebastian Lundberg; Eshraque Mughal	iSHi	4:39
12.	"It's Not Design" (featuring Salim)	Jaco; Long; Morel	Simonsayz; B-Sides	3:50
13.	"Wild Child" (featuring Jake Torrey)	Jaco; Morel; Jacob Torrey; Tara Colleen Vachon	Torrey; Simonsayz	3:28
14.	"More Than My Heart" (featuring Rxmn and Salim)	Jaco; Cyshae Strachan; Brandon Hamlin; Nathaniel Caserta	Purps; Cy Fyre; B HAM	3:56
Total length:				60:57

Notes

- "Pick Up the Phone" features uncredited vocals by Sebastian Lundberg.
- "Jump" contains samples of Bla Bla Bla by Gigi D'Agostino

== Charts ==
Chart (2017)	Peak position
Canadian Albums (Billboard)	46
New Zealand Heatseekers Albums (RMNZ)	5
US Billboard 200	28
US Top R&B/Hip-Hop Albums (Billboard)	11
