= The Show Goes On (song) =

2010 single by Lupe Fiasco

Single by Lupe Fiasco

from the album Lasers
- Released: October 26, 2010
- Recorded: 2010
- Genre: Pop rap
- Length: 3:56
- Label: 1st & 15th; Atlantic
- Songwriters: Wasalu Jaco; Daniel Johnson; Dustin Brower; Jonethon Keith Brown; Isaac Brock; Dann Gallucci; Eric Judy
- Producer: Kane Beatz

Lupe Fiasco singles chronology
"I'm Beamin'" (2010)	"The Show Goes On" (2010)	"Words I Never Said" (2011)

Music video
- "Show Goes On" on YouTube

"The Show Goes On" is a song by American rapper Lupe Fiasco, released by Atlantic Records on October 26, 2010, as the lead single from his third studio album Lasers. The song was produced by Kane Beatz and features an uncredited guest appearance from JR Get Money, who performs the hook — which is melodically interpolative of the 2004 song "Float On" by indie rock band Modest Mouse; as a result, band members Isaac Brock, Eric Judy and Benjamin Weikel are credited as co-writers, alongside Dustin Brower, as well as Lupe Fiasco, Kane Beatz and JR Get Money themselves.

"The Show Goes On" debuted at number 57 on the Billboard Hot 100, and peaked at number nine - it remains Fiasco's highest-charting song. It was released on iTunes on November 9, 2010, and in the UK on February 20, 2011. The song was a major point of contention for the artist and a reason for the lengthy delay of the album, making the title fitting; as Lupe was told unequivocally by record producers: "If you don't do 'The Show Goes On', your album's not coming out." However, XXL named it 14th Best Song of 2011. The song was nominated for Best Rap Performance and Best Rap Song at the 54th Grammy Awards.

== Background ==
Lupe Fiasco announced the name of the single at the Fiasco Friday protest on October 15, 2010. On that day, Lyor Cohen came down to play the single for the protest turned celebrating fan base situated outside Atlantic Records. In a NovaFM interview, he gave an analysis of the first verse. He went on to say, "For them it was 'why is he talking about the record label, but it's still a great song. For me, I was like 'No, that's my therapy... To give you this song... Now you have to make it a worldwide smash. You have to play it on the radio... So every time you hear it, you're going to hear me talking about your ass."

On February 28, 2011, what the Complex magazine published an interview with Lupe that detailed the background behind the single.

There's nothing really to tell about that record, to be honest. I didn't have nothing to do with that record. That was the label's record. That wasn't like I knew the producer or knew the writer or anything like that. That was one of those records the record company gave me, [they even gave me] stuff they wanted me to rap about. It wasn't like, 'Hey I did this and I went to a mountain and found inspiration and it was this'. [...] I had to do "The Show Goes On", that was like the big chip on the table. I had to do it and it had to be the first single if the record was going to come out.

In an interview with The Adelaide Tribune, Lupe expanded further on his feelings toward the record.

I was literally told for "The Show Goes On" that I shouldn't rap too deep. I shouldn't be too lyrical. It just needs to be something easy on the eyes. Like a record company telling Picasso that we don't need these abstract interpretations of life, where people have to sit down and look at it and break it down. It was better to paint the Upper West Side lady and her poodle so everyone could look at it right away and understand what was going on. I felt like I was painting poodles. It's why in the first line of "The Show Goes On" I paraphrase Johnny Rotten at the Sex Pistols' final show: "Have you ever had the feeling that you were being cheated".

Writing credits are given to Lupe Fiasco, Isaac Brock, Dustin Brower, Jonathon Brown, Dann Gallucci, Eric Judy and to producer Kane Beatz.

The song was released on Lupe Fiasco's website on October 26 for download. This marked the first officially planned released single from Lasers ("Shining Down" and "I'm Beamin" were leaks re-released as street singles). "The Show Goes On" appeared on the iTunes Music Store on November 9.

== Music video ==
The music video for "The Show Goes On" was released on December 25, 2010. It was directed by Hiro Murai and shows Lupe backstage preparing for a performance. Contrary to popular belief, the skull and crossbones glove is actually associated with Mastermind Japan the and not Lupe Fiasco's post-punk band, Japanese Cartoon. It was MTV's last Jam Of The Week of 2010. The video itself was nominated for MTV's Video Music Award for Best Hip Hop Video in 2011.

== Chart performance ==
"The Show Goes On" peaked at No. 9 on the Billboard Hot 100, making this song Lupe's second top ten hit and biggest hit to date. "The Show Goes On" is Lupe Fiasco's best-selling and highest-charting song to date. As of June 2011, the single has sold more than 3,000,000 digital units in the US.

== Charts ==
=== Charts ===
Chart (2011)	Peak position
Australia (ARIA)	5
Belgium (Ultratip Bubbling Under Flanders)	50
Canada Hot 100 (Billboard)	19
Canada CHR/Top 40 (Billboard)	12
Canada Hot AC (Billboard)	46
Ireland (IRMA)	19
New Zealand (Recorded Music NZ)	18
UK Singles (Official Charts)	49
US Billboard Hot 100	9
US Hot R&B/Hip-Hop Songs (Billboard)	45
US Hot Rap Songs (Billboard)	4
US Pop Airplay (Billboard)	6
US Rhythmic Airplay (Billboard)	1

=== Year-end charts ===
Chart (2011)	Position
Australia (ARIA)	51
Canada (Canadian Hot 100)	87
US Billboard Hot 100	28
US Mainstream Top 40 (Billboard)	39
US Rhythmic (Billboard)	7

== Certifications ==
Region	Certification	Certified units/sales
Australia (ARIA)	2× Platinum	140,000^{^}
New Zealand (RMNZ)	2× Platinum	60,000^{‡}
United Kingdom (BPI)	Silver	200,000^{‡}
United States (RIAA)	7× Platinum	7,000,000^{‡}
^{^} Shipments figures based on certification alone.^{‡} Sales+streaming figures based on certification alone.
