= Out of My Head (Lupe Fiasco song) =

Single by Lupe Fiasco featuring Trey Songz

from the album Lasers
- Released: May 22, 2011
- Recorded: 2010
- Genre: Hip hop; R&B
- Length: 3:24
- Label: 1st & 15th; Atlantic
- Songwriters: Wasalu Jaco; Arden Altino; Jerry Duplessis; Ronnie Jackson; Jesse Wilson; Miykal Snoddy
- Producers: Miykal Snoddy; Altino

Lupe Fiasco singles chronology
"Words I Never Said" (2011)	"Out of My Head" (2011)	"I Don't Wanna Care Right Now" (2011)

Trey Songz singles chronology
"Unusual" (2011)	"Out of My Head" (2011)	"Take Off" (2011)

"Out of My Head" is a song by American rapper Lupe Fiasco, released as the third single from his third studio album, Lasers. The single features vocals from American R&B singer Trey Songz, and features production from record producer Miykal Snoddy, with co-production from fellow producers Jerry Wonda and Arden Altino. The song was released as a digital download on May 22, 2011, along with the rest of Lasers. Fiasco performed this single with Trey Songz at the 2011 MTV Movie Awards. Lyrically, the song likens a love interest to that of a catchy song.

The song was Fiasco's third and to date, last top-40 hit in the U.S., reaching number 40 on the Billboard Hot 100. Critical reception was mixed, and it was named the 34th best song of 2011 by XXL.

== Background ==
Lupe Fiasco says that the song "doesn't have any deep meaning behind it, and is for the chicks." Trey Songz has praised the song, saying that it was one of his favorite collaborations he ever did.

== Music video ==
A behind-the-scenes video was released on June 19, 2011. The director of the video is Gil Green. The music video debuted on MTV and YouTube on June 29, 2011. Model Tracey Thomas played the girl throughout the video. Oklahoma City Thunder's Serge Ibaka made a cameo appearance in the video.

== Critical reception ==
Critics had a wide range of views about "Out of My Head". Brad Wete of Entertainment Weekly called the song "spacey" and an example of "love and joy" on Lasers. For Spin, Brandon Soderberg was complimentary of the songwriting for "skip[ping] icky lover-man clichés and employ[ing] an extended music-industry-as-romance metaphor instead". Matthew Cole of Slant Magazine called the song a "solid banger" but added that the chorus by Trey Songz "seems to incarnate Lupe's thesis that hip-hop radio provides materialistic escapism at the price of the listener's political consciousness."

However, other critics were more negative, for instance USA Today critic Steve Jones considering the song an attempt at pandering to mainstream audiences. For HipHopDX, Edwin Ortiz called the lyrics "predictable" and the song's placement "a disconcerting lapse in execution" on the album. In a 2012 commentary on HipHopDX, Omar Burgess regarded "Out of My Head" as "visibly forced" but an example of a commercially successful hip-hop ballad. Todd Martens of the Los Angeles Times regarded the song as "loaded with trendy synths and a pin-the-sympathy-on-the-song chorus". XXL ranked "Out of My Head" no. 34 in its "Top 100 Songs of 2011" list.

== Chart performance ==
=== Weekly charts ===
Chart (2011)	Peak position
Australia (ARIA)	52
US Billboard Hot 100	40
US Hot R&B/Hip-Hop Songs (Billboard)	11
US Rap Songs (Billboard)	5
US Rhythmic Airplay (Billboard)	8

=== Year-end charts ===
Chart (2011)	Position
US Hot R&B/Hip-Hop Songs (Billboard)	39
US Rhythmic (Billboard)	35

== Certifications ==
Region	Certification	Certified units/sales
United States (RIAA)	Gold	500,000^{‡}
^{‡} Sales+streaming figures based on certification alone.
