= Food & Liquor II: The Great American Rap Album Pt. 1 =

Studio album by Lupe Fiasco
- Released: September 25, 2012
- Recorded: 2009–2012
- Genre: Conscious hip hop
- Length: 68:47
- Labels: 1st & 15th; Atlantic
- Producers: Lupe Fiasco (exec.); Charles "Chilly" Patton (exec.); Darrale Jones (co-exec.); 1500 or Nothin'; The Audibles; B-Sides; Julian Bunetta; Simonsayz; Soundtrakk; Mr. Inkredible; Infamous; King David; Klypso; Mike & Keys; Jason "Poo Bear" Boyd; Famties & Bullit; Pro-Jay; The Runners; Severe

Lupe Fiasco chronology
Lasers (2011)	Food & Liquor II: The Great American Rap Album Pt. 1 (2012)	Tetsuo & Youth (2015)

Singles from Food & Liquor II: The Great American Rap Album Pt. 1
- 1. "Around My Way (Freedom Ain't Free)" Released: May 21, 2012; 2. "Bitch Bad" Released: June 26, 2012; 3. "Go to Sleep" Released: July 2, 2012; 4. "Lamborghini Angels" Released: August 14, 2012; 5. "Battle Scars" Released: August 28, 2012

Food & Liquor II: The Great American Rap Album Pt. 1 is the fourth studio album by American rapper Lupe Fiasco, released on September 25, 2012. Production for the album took place between 2009 and 2012. The album was intended to be released in June 2009, but was postponed due to the Lasers album. Food & Liquor II: The Great American Rap Album Pt. 1 features production by The Audibles, 1500 or Nothin', B-Sides, Simonsayz, The Runners, and long-time collaborator Soundtrakk among others. Bilal, Poo Bear, Guy Sebastian, Casey Benjamin, Jason Evigan, and Jane $$$ contribute vocals to the album.

The album is one of many albums released by Fiasco that fall under the subgenre conscious rap. Songs on the album cover a wide variety of topics such as misogyny in rap, the struggles of being an African American, and the wide success that African Americans have experienced in society. Food & Liquor II: The Great American Rap Album Pt. 1 was preceded by the lead single "Around My Way (Freedom Ain't Free)" and its follow-up "Bitch Bad". The third single was "Lamborghini Angels" followed by "Battle Scars". Food & Liquor II: The Great American Rap Album Pt. 1 debuted at number 5 on the US Billboard 200 chart, selling 89,778 copies in its first week. It was nominated for Best Rap Album at the 55th Grammy Awards.

== Background ==
Lupe Fiasco, first revealed the title of the album on his blog on February 4, 2009. In November 2010, Lupe Fiasco rapped the second verse of "Strange Fruition", the second song on the album, at Marquette University. While waiting for the release of his 2011 album Lasers — which experienced a much-publicized delay in the wake of artistic conflicts between Fiasco and Atlantic Records — Fiasco began to work on another album titled Food & Liquor II: The Great American Rap Album. During this same Lasers delay, Fiasco released the song "Go to Sleep" from the album's recording sessions, "out of desperation" to put out new music. The record ended up being very well received by both fans and critics from the blogosphere. Fiasco announced his intention to include the street single "Go To Sleep" as the introductory track to the finished product. Ultimately, "Go to Sleep" ended up being a bonus track to the album. Originally, the album was set to be released as a double-disc album, but Atlantic Records did not allow this arrangement, so the album was divided into two. It was confirmed that Part 2 would be released in Spring 2013. On January 17, 2013, Lupe announced Food & Liquor II: The Great American Rap Album Pt. 2 would be cancelled and a new album would be announced later that year.

== Artwork ==
The album cover of Food & Liquor II: The Great American Rap Album Pt. I is entirely black (color code: 0b0708), continuing the dark minimalist motif of the album's previous single artworks, which all have the same background color, as well as the mixtapes Enemy of the State: A Love Story and Friend of the People. He said in an interview that he wanted to see if he could get Atlantic Records to do it, as a challenge. In a more recent interview, Lupe explained how Johnny Cash's "Man in Black" was an inspiration to create the all-black album art. The artwork also goes along with the theme of "All Black Everything", a track from his album Lasers. The song was originally going to be featured on this album, before Fiasco decided to feature it on his third album.

== Singles ==
The album's first single, "Around My Way (Freedom Ain't Free)", was released on May 21, 2012, resulted in a fury of debate over the song's production. "Around My Way" is based around a sample that was also utilized in the Pete Rock & CL Smooth song "They Reminisce Over You (T.R.O.Y.)", a track that has evolved into a hip-hop staple since its 1992 release. Pete Rock himself, via his Twitter account, expressed intense displeasure at the song's producers for choosing "T.R.O.Y." as the backing sample, but soon afterward apologized for the outburst. According to an exasperated Lupe Fiasco, he and the label had reached out to Rock several months beforehand for his approval on using the original instrumental, which eventually had to be intricately replicated by B-Side and DJ Simonsayz; the "T.R.O.Y." song itself sampled work from Tom Scott as well, which further complicated the legalities behind sample clearances. In another statement from Pete Rock, he admitted the truth behind what Lupe had revealed, but also reiterated his interest in having been more directly involved with the production of "Around My Way". The situation between Fiasco and Pete Rock is still reportedly rocky, and the two have yet to come to terms.

The album's second single, "Bitch Bad", was released on June 26, 2012. The song discusses the misuse of the word "bitch" in hip-hop songs and the negative effects it has in shaping the mindsets of children.

The album's third single, "Go to Sleep", the initial track was released back in 2010 and the track was formally released as the third single on July 2, 2012.

The album's fourth single, "Lamborghini Angels", was released on August 14, 2012. He issued a warning to the fans due to the religious content of the song.

The album's fifth single, "Battle Scars" with Australian singer-songwriter Guy Sebastian, originally on Sebastian's seventh album Armageddon, but Fiasco announced that the track would also serve as a single for his own album, but not on the Australian version of the album.

== Reception ==
=== Critical response ===
Professional ratings
Review scores
Source	Rating
AllMusic	3.5/5 stars
The A.V. Club	B
Entertainment Weekly	B
The Guardian	2/5 stars
The Observer	3/5 stars
Pitchfork	6.8/10
PopMatters	7/10
Rolling Stone	3/5 stars
Spin	6/10
XXL	4/5 (XL)

Food & Liquor II received generally positive reviews from contemporary music critics. At Metacritic, which assigns a normalized rating out of 100 to reviews from mainstream critics, the album received an average score of 70, based on 18 reviews. Allmusic editor Andy Kellman commended Fiasco for "delivering a message and provoking debate" and stated, "As with many of his songs, the lyrical value (clever, cerebral) is far greater than the musical value (sluggish, meandering)." Although he found its music less "ambitious" than Fiasco's lyrics, Ken Capobianco of The Boston Globe called the album "a challenging set that refuses to settle for easy rhymes or facile ideas." Kitty Empire of The Observer characterized its music as "pugnaciously mass-market", but complimented Fiasco's "righteous fury and weary humour." Luke Winkie of Paste viewed that the album "feels good" and stated, "Fiasco is focused, and results may vary. We’re glad to have him back." Adam Fleischer of XXL commented that "the lyricism is impeccable throughout" and viewed the album as an "achievement" for "the pinnacle of lyricism that Lupe continues to reach". David Bennun of The Quietus called it "an exhilarating, uneven, thought-provoking, over-egged, over-long, lucid, barnstorming, soul-infused hip-hop album of a type that ... you just don't get any more."

In a mixed review, Paul MacInnes of The Guardian criticized Fiasco for "stand[ing] out from many of his hip-hop peers ... in such portentous fashion" and stated, "Fiasco is not without skills or beliefs, but neither are as refined as his self-regard." Jody Rosen of Rolling Stone felt that Fiasco is "better when he relaxes a little" and observed "the usual Lupe deficiencies: a hectoring tone ('Bitch Bad') and bombastic beats that pile-drive messages home." Although he found it to be Fiasco's most "rewarding effort in a while", Pitchfork Media's Jayson Greene criticized "his touch" as "so shallow that it ends up feeling crass" and stated, "At its worst, [the album]'s plagued by the same empty cleverness and strident moralizing that has always dragged down Lupe's music." Colin McGuire of PopMatters also felt that Fiasco exhibits "heavy-headedness" and ultimately called the album "better-than-average introspective and culturally conscious hip-hop". Mosi Reeves of Spin wrote that the album is "fine and good. It's just not The Great American Rap Album." MSN Music's Robert Christgau gave the album a two-star honorable mention, indicating a "likable effort consumers attuned to its overriding aesthetic or individual vision may well enjoy." He cited "Bitch Bad" and "Hood Now (Outro)" as highlights and quipped, "Veteran wannabe avers amid thousands of words that if he were a Buddhist he'd be reborn as himself".

=== Commercial performance ===
The album debuted at number five on the US Billboard 200 chart, selling 89,778 copies in its first week. It debuted number one on both R&B/Hip-Hop and Rap Albums. As of October 21, 2012 it has sold 128,000 copies.

== Track listing ==
No.	Title	Writer(s)	Producer(s)	Length
1.	"Ayesha (Intro)"	Ayesha Jaco		1:56
2.	"Strange Fruition" (featuring Casey Benjamin)	Wasalu Jaco; Albert Francis; Carl Sigman; Rudolph Lopez	Soundtrakk	3:41
3.	"ITAL (Roses)"	W. Jaco; Larrance Dopson; Kenneth Alexander; Brody Brown; Charles Hamilton; Lamar Edwards; Alexandria Dopson; Carlos McSlain	1500 or Nothin'	4:24
4.	"Around My Way (Freedom Ain't Free)"	W. Jaco; Martyn Buchwald; Paul Kantner; Peter Phillips; Corey Penn	Simonsayz; B-Sides	4:15
5.	"Audubon Ballroom"	W. Jaco; Thomas Mueller; Marcello Pagin; Christian Büttner	Famties & Bullit	4:40
6.	"Bitch Bad"	W. Jaco; Dominic Jordan; Jimmy Giannos; Jason Boyd	The Audibles; Jason Boyd	4:49
7.	"Lamborghini Angels"	W. Jaco; Brian Tistog	Mr. Inkredible	3:16
8.	"Put 'Em Up"	W. Jaco; Hamilton; Dopson; Brown; Edwards; Alexander; Dopson; McSlain; Julian Bunetta	1500 or Nothin'; Julian Bunetta	3:56
9.	"Heart Donor" (featuring Poo Bear)	W. Jaco; Boyd; Jermaine Jackson; Andrew Harr	The Runners; Boyd	4:00
10.	"How Dare You" (featuring Bilal)	W. Jaco; Boyd; Andre Samuel; Joseph Mourad	Klypso; Severe	4:09
11.	"Battle Scars" (featuring Guy Sebastian)	W. Jaco; Guy Sebastian; David Harris	Pro-Jay	4:10
12.	"Brave Heart" (featuring Poo Bear)	W. Jaco; Boyd; Jackson; Harr	The Runners; Boyd	3:25
13.	"Form Follows Function"	W. Jaco; Marco Rodriguez-Diaz	Infamous	4:22
14.	"Cold War" (featuring Jane $$$)	W. Jaco; Brown; Dopson; Hamilton; Edwards; Alexander; Dopson; McSlain	1500 or Nothin'	6:27
15.	"Unforgivable Youth" (featuring Jason Evigan)	W. Jaco; Mourad	King David	4:55
16.	"Hood Now (Outro)"	W. Jaco; Alexander; Dopson; Brown; Edwards; Hamilton; Boyd; McSlain; Michael Ray Cox Jr.; John Groover	1500 or Nothin'; Mike & Keys	6:21
Total length:				64:15

iTunes bonus tracks
No.	Title	Writer(s)	Producer(s)	Length
17.	"Go to Sleep"	W. Jaco; Edwards	1500 or Nothin'	4:32
Total length:				68:47

The CD version ends with a track called "Things We Must Do for Others", a 12-second recording of Fiasco telling listeners that the credit information for the album can be found underneath the CD tray.

Sample credits

- "Strange Fruition" samples "Where Do I Begin (Love Story)" by Percy Faith & His Orchestra.
- "Around My Way (Freedom Ain't Free)" samples "Today" by Jefferson Airplane and "They Reminisce Over You (T.R.O.Y.)" by Pete Rock & CL Smooth.
- "Lamborghini Angels" interpolates "Angels (Remix)" by Lupe Fiasco.

== Personnel ==
Credits for Food & Liquor II adapted from All Music.

- Andre Samuel – composer
- The Audibles – producer
- The B-Sides – producer
- Bilal – featured artist, producer
- Christian Buettner – composer
- Julian Bunetta – composer, producer
- Graham Burris – engineer
- Larrance Dopson – composer, producer
- Lupe Fiasco – additional production, art direction, composer, design, executive producer, primary artist
- Albert Lai Francis – composer
- 'Free Chilly' – executive producer
- The Futuristiks – producer
- Jimmy Giannos – composer
- Andrew Harr – composer
- David Ryan Harris – composer
- Infamous – producer
- Jermaine Jackson – composer
- Ayesha Jaco – primary artist
- Darrale Jones – executive producer
- Dominic Jordan – composer
- King David – producer
- Klypso – producer
- Mr. Inkredible – producer
- Jason "Poo Bear" Boyd – composer, producer
- Joseph Mourad – composer
- Thomas Mueller – composer
- Mark Obriski – art direction, design
- Marcello Pagin – composer
- P. Phillips – composer
- Poo Bear – composer, featured artist, producer
- Pro-Jay – producer
- Jamal "Mally Mall" Rashid – producer
- Marco "Infamous" Rodriquez – composer
- The Runners – producer
- Guy Sebastian – composer, featured artist
- Severe – producer
- Carl Sigman – composer
- Simonsayz – producer
- Soundtrakk – composer, producer
- Marsha St. Hubert – marketing
- Brian Tistog – composer
- Richard Conti – saxophone
- Alejandro Elizondo – keyboards
- Jason Evigian – vocals
- Ava Johnson – vocals
- Ralfy "FAFA" Valencia – bass
- Ted Zimmerman – trumpet

== Charts ==
=== Weekly charts ===
Chart (2012)	Peak position
Canadian Albums Chart	13
UK Albums Chart	60
UK R&B Album Chart	3
US Billboard 200	5
US Billboard R&B/Hip-Hop Albums	1
US Billboard Rap Albums	1

=== Year-end charts ===
Chart (2012)	Position
US Billboard 200	190
US Top R&B/Hip-Hop Albums (Billboard)	43

Chart (2013)	Position
US Top R&B/Hip-Hop Albums (Billboard)	91

== Certifications ==
Certifications for Food & Liquor 2: The Great American Rap Album, Pt. 1
Region	Certification	Certified units/sales
United States (RIAA)	Gold	500,000^{‡}
^{‡} Sales+streaming figures based on certification alone.
