= Lamborghini Angels =

Single by Lupe Fiasco

from the album Food & Liquor II: The Great American Rap Album Pt. 1
- Released: August 14, 2012
- Recorded: 2012
- Genre: Hip hop; alternative hip hop
- Label: 1st & 15th; Atlantic
- Songwriters: Wasalu Jaco; Brian Tistog
- Producer: Mr. Inkredible

Lupe Fiasco singles chronology
"Bitch Bad" (2012)	"Lamborghini Angels" (2012)	"Battle Scars" (2012)

"Lamborghini Angels" is a song performed by rapper Lupe Fiasco. It was released on August 14, 2012 as the third single from his album Food & Liquor II: The Great American Rap Album Pt. 1. The song contains lyrics that may offend people because of its religious content.

== Music video ==
On June 11, 2013, Lupe Fiasco tweeted "Lamborghini Angels, ITAL, & Audubon Ballroom. 3 Videos. 1 Day. Coming Soon. #FL2". The video was released on July 4, 2013, entitled "#1234". In the video, Lupe tackles social, political, and racial issues. Children are seen watching television as images of guns, drugs, and fast food flash across the screen. The video is almost 13 minutes in length.

In one scene, a conservative, executive, grandmother, priest, and KKK member sit down at a conference table to meet, but it quickly turns ugly. And in the shocking conclusion, Lupe pulls up a white hood to reveal himself.

== Chart performance ==
"Lamborghini Angels" debuted and peaked at No. 92 on the Billboard Hot 100 in September 2012.

Chart (2012)	Peak position
US Billboard Hot 100	92
