= Bitch Bad =

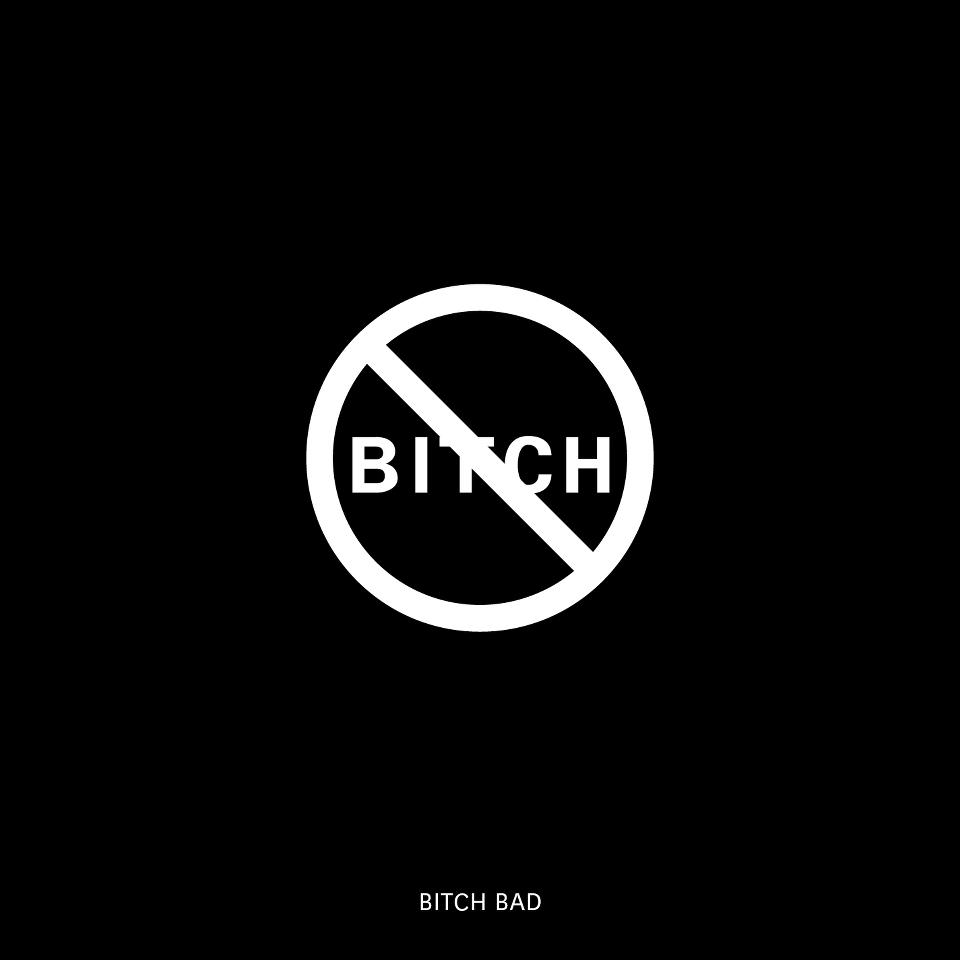

Single by Lupe Fiasco

from the album Food & Liquor II: The Great American Rap Album Pt. 1
- Released: June 25, 2012
- Recorded: 2012
- Genre: Hip hop; conscious hip hop
- Length: 4:51
- Label: 1st & 15th; Atlantic
- Songwriters: Wasalu Jaco; Dominic Jordan; Jimmy Giannos; Jason Boyd
- Producers: The Audibles; Jason Boyd

Lupe Fiasco singles chronology
"Around My Way (Freedom Ain't Free)" (2012)	"Bitch Bad" (2012)	"Lamborghini Angels" (2012)

"Bitch Bad" is a song by American rapper Lupe Fiasco. It is the second single off his album Food & Liquor II: The Great American Rap Album Pt. 1. It was released on June 25, 2012. "Bitch Bad" addresses misogyny in hip hop culture, the use of the word "bitch" in rap music, the effects of these things on society and children, and the Madonna–whore complex.

== Music video ==
The music video was released on August 22, 2012 on MTV's RapFix Live and premiered on YouTube the same day. The video was directed by Gil Green. He dedicates the video to Paul Robeson and the "many black actors who endured the humiliating process of blackface in America". MDMA made a cameo appearance singing his lines in the end of the video.

== Critical reception ==
The song has garnered praise from artists such as Janelle Monáe, Talib Kweli, Jill Scott, and Kanye West, who even posted the video on his Twitter. The song, however, was not well received by Spin Magazine, who wrote that the song and the video were "mansplaining...half-baked conscious hip-pop...muddled, measly-mouthed missive...reckless social commentary...poorly thought-out grab for attention", and claimed that Lupe has a "moronic lyrics-over-everything attitude". In response Lupe encouraged fans to boycott the magazine.

== Charts ==
Chart (2012)	Peak position
US Billboard Bubbling Under Hot 100 Singles	11
US Hot R&B/Hip-Hop Songs (Billboard)	62
