= Around My Way (Freedom Ain't Free) =

Single by Lupe Fiasco

from the album Food & Liquor II: The Great American Rap Album Pt. 1
- Released: May 21, 2012
- Recorded: 2012
- Genre: Hip hop; alternative hip hop; political hip hop
- Length: 4:19
- Label: 1st & 15th; Atlantic
- Songwriters: Wasalu Jaco; Martyn Buchwald; Paul Kantner; Peter Phillips; Corey Penn
- Producers: Simonsayz; B-Sides

Lupe Fiasco singles chronology
"Angels & Stars" (2012)	"Around My Way (Freedom Ain't Free)" (2012)	"Bitch Bad" (2012)

"Around My Way (Freedom Ain't Free)" is a song performed by rapper Lupe Fiasco. The song is based on a sample of Pete Rock & CL Smooth's 1992 release "They Reminisce Over You (T.R.O.Y.)". It was the first single off his album Food & Liquor II: The Great American Rap Album Pt. 1. It was released as a single on May 21, 2012.

== Music video ==
The music video was released on June 27, 2012, on 106 & Park and premiered on YouTube the same day. The video was directed by Alex Nazari and was filmed in Lupe's hometown of Chicago. In the video, Lupe's sporting glowing, demon-like eyes and has a "crew" in 2D Animation, along with what would be a rented car, all three used as a satire for the problems within the American social, economic and political project. Rapper Trae tha Truth makes a cameo appearance in the video.

== Controversy ==
"Around My Way" is based around a sample that was also utilized in the Pete Rock & CL Smooth song "They Reminisce Over You (T.R.O.Y.)", a track that has evolved into a hip-hop staple since its 1992 release. Pete Rock himself, via his Twitter account, expressed intense displeasure at the song's producers for choosing "T.R.O.Y." as the backing sample, but soon afterward apologized for the outburst. According to an exasperated Lupe Fiasco, he and the label had reached out to Rock several months beforehand for his approval on using the original instrumental, which eventually had to be intricately replicated by B-Side and DJ Simonsayz; the "T.R.O.Y." song itself sampled work from Tom Scott as well, which further complicated the legalities behind sample clearances.

== Chart performance ==
"Around My Way (Freedom Ain't Free)" debuted at #76 on the Billboard Hot 100.

Chart (2012)	Peak position
US Billboard Hot 100	76
