= Words I Never Said =

2011 song by Lupe Fiasco

Single by Lupe Fiasco featuring Skylar Grey

from the album Lasers
- Released: February 8, 2011
- Recorded: 2010
- Genre: Political hip hop; conscious hip hop
- Length: 4:21
- Label: 1st & 15th; Atlantic
- Songwriter(s): Wasalu Jaco; Holly Hafermann; Alexander Grant
- Producer(s): Alex da Kid

Lupe Fiasco singles chronology
"The Show Goes On" (2010)	"Words I Never Said" (2011)	"Out of My Head" (2011)

Skylar Grey singles chronology
"I Need a Doctor" (2011)	"Words I Never Said" (2011)	"Dance Without You" (2011)

"Words I Never Said" is a song by American hip hop recording artist Lupe Fiasco, released February 8, 2011, as the second single from his third studio album Lasers. The song was produced by British music producer Alex da Kid and features vocals from American singer-songwriter Skylar Grey. The song contains references to controversial political and socioeconomic topics, including the September 11 attacks, government fiscal policy, and the Gaza War. The song's message of standing up for the people and being against the government has been used as a theme song for Internet group Anonymous. It was named the 41st best song of 2011 by XXL magazine.

== Background ==
A teaser video was uploaded on YouTube on January 18, 2011, featuring only samples of lyrics and audio from the song. 'Words I Never Said' officially premiered on Lupe Fiasco's website on February 1, 2011, along with its single cover. When the full audio was released, #wordsineversaid was a trending topic on Twitter. It became available to stores and iTunes on February 8, 2011.

On February 18, 2011, in an interview with DJ Semtex on BBC 1Xtra, Lupe revealed that the record was given to him by Atlantic, but he cut out a bridge sung by Skylar Grey, who meant for it to be a song about relationships. This is the second time Fiasco and Grey have been featured on a track together, the first being "Be Somebody" from Fort Minor's album The Rising Tied, with Grey performing under the name Holly Brook.

The song, which was one of the last written for the album, can also be interpreted as a thinly disguised message aimed at Atlantic Records producer, who in Fiasco's opinion forced a lot of material on the album that did not sit right with him.

== Music video ==
On April 29, 2011, the official music video for "Words I Never Said" was premiered by MTV and later onto YouTube. It was directed by Sanaa Hamri, who was previously directing Nicki Minaj's "Super Bass".

== Use in popular media ==
British rapper Lowkey sampled the lyric "Limbaugh is a racist, Glenn Beck is a racist, Gaza Strip was getting bombed, Obama didn’t say shit" from the first verse of "Words I Never Said", for the chorus in his song "Obama Nation (Pt. 2)", featuring M-1 and Black the Ripper, from Lowkey's second studio album Soundtrack to the Struggle (2011).

== Charts ==
Chart (2011)	Peak position
US Billboard Hot 100	89
US R&B/Hip-Hop Digital Songs (Billboard)	26

== Skylar Grey version ==
"Words"

Single by Skylar Grey

from the album The Buried Sessions of Skylar Grey
- Released: March 10, 2015
- Recorded: 2010
- Genre: Synthpop
- Length: 5:06
- Label: Interscope; KIDinaKORNER
- Songwriter(s): Wasalu Jaco; Holly Hafermann; Alexander Grant

Skylar Grey singles chronology
"I Know You" (2015)	"Words" (2015)	"Addicted to Love" (2015)

Grey's solo record of Words I Never Said under the title of Words was first released in 2012, and included on her extended play The Buried Sessions of Skylar Grey, released on January 17, 2012. After that, the song was also included on the Step Up Revolution film soundtrack, along with another track by the singer, called "Dance Without You" and songs by other artists like Fergie, Jennifer Lopez, Yelawolf, and many more. On March 10, 2015, Skylar Grey officially released the song on iTunes.

=== Background ===
This song was dedicated to her grandfather who has died. She never really spent time with her grandfather because of her music career.
