= Can't Tell Me Nothing (mixtape) =

Can't Tell Me Nothing: The Official Mixtape

Mixtape by Kanye West
- Released: May 27, 2007
- Recorded: 2006–2007
- Genre: Hip-hop
- Length: 64:25
- Labels: GOOD; Roc-A-Fella; Def Jam
- Producers: Kanye West (exec.); Lupe Fiasco; 88-Keys; A-Trak; WrighTrax; Sa-Ra; StarGate; T-Pain; Polow da Don

Kanye West chronology
| Welcome to Kanye's Soul Mix Show (2006) | Can't Tell Me Nothing: The Official Mixtape (2007) | Graduation (2007) |

Can't Tell Me Nothing: The Official Mixtape is the fifth mixtape by American rapper Kanye West. It was made freely available over the internet on May 27, 2007, in anticipation of the release of his third studio album, Graduation, of which it is named after the lead single, which is included as the first track of the mixtape.

== Background ==
The official mixtape was hosted by West alongside his A&R, Plain Pat. Overall, it is compiled of songs made by various artists signed onto West's G.O.O.D. Music label, collaborations with other unaffiliated musicians, and preview versions of certain songs that would later appear on Graduation. The mixtape was very well received and gave off several tracks that later became successful singles.

== Reception ==
Professional ratings
Review scores
| Source | Rating |
|---|---|
| MSN Music (Consumer Guide) | (3-star Honorable Mention) |
| Rolling Stone | 4/5 stars |
| Stylus Magazine | A− |
| URB | 4/5 stars |

Stylus Magazine awarded Can't Tell Me Nothing an A− rating and complimented it for expressing a high quality in comparison to most promotional mixtapes, claiming, "Even with a few duds, this might be the album of the year." On its general review of the mixtape, Stylus wrote, "Can't Tell Me Nothing is one mixtape that should be legendary on its own, rather than piggybacking off its 'parent' album. It's as diverse as anything I've heard this year, both as intelligent and as stoopid as it wants to be (cf. "Us Placers" vs. "Throw Some D's (Remix)"), and gloriously so." Rock critic Robert Christgau dictated, "Get this while you can from the mixtape man no matter how much of it is destined for the real album." URB wrote, "Although the scatterbrained way Kanye chooses to present himself will continue to face scrutiny and divide opinion, any critic would be hard pressed to deny his talent. Whatever persona he adopts, whether relatively restrained or unsurprisingly in your face, the artist rarely fails to engage." Can't Tell Me Nothing won "Mixtape of the Year" at the 2007 Vibe Awards.

== Track listing ==
| No. | Title | Producer | Length |
|---|---|---|---|
| 1. | "Friday Morning, May 25th, 2007" (intro performed by Kanye West, Tony Williams and DeRay Davis) | Kanye West | 2:17 |
| 2. | "Stronger" (snippet performed by Kanye West) | Kanye West | 1:23 |
| 3. | "Us Placers" (performed by Child Rebel Soldier) | Lupe Fiasco | 3:54 |
| 4. | "I Ain't Even on Yet" (performed by GLC) | Xcel | 2:36 |
| 5. | "Can't Tell Me Nothing" (performed by Kanye West) | Kanye West | 4:08 |
| 6. | "Southside" (snippet performed by Common featuring Kanye West) | Kanye West | 2:22 |
| 7. | "The Game" (performed by Common) | Kanye West | 2:30 |
| 8. | "Porno" (interlude performed by Kanye West) | Kanye West | 1:15 |
| 9. | "Stay Up" (snippet performed by 88-Keys featuring Kanye West and Malik Yusef) | 88-Keys | 1:50 |
| 10. | "In the Mood" (performed by Talib Kweli featuring Kanye West) | Kanye West | 2:32 |
| 11. | "C.O.L.O.U.R.S." (performed by Fonzworth Bentley featuring Pimp C and Lil Wayne) | | 4:45 |
| 12. | "Pro Nails" (performed by Kid Sister featuring Kanye West) | A-Trak | 2:37 |
| 13. | "Young Folks" (performed by Kanye West) | Kanye West | 1:47 |
| 14. | "Interviews" (interlude performed by Kanye West and Tony Williams) | Kanye West | 3:31 |
| 15. | "The People" (performed by Common) | Kanye West | 3:25 |
| 16. | "Get'cha Some" (performed by Big Sean) | WrighTrax | 2:57 |
| 17. | "Don't Forget Em" (performed by Consequence) | Kanye West | 2:55 |
| 18. | "White (On the Floor)" (performed by Sa-Ra) | Sa-Ra | 3:00 |
| 19. | "Because of You" (remix performed by Ne-Yo featuring Kanye West) | Stargate | 1:35 |
| 20. | "Buy You a Drank" (remix performed by T-Pain featuring Kanye West) | T-Pain | 2:01 |
| 21. | "Throw Some D's" (interlude performed by Kanye West) | Polow da Don | 0:36 |
| 22. | "Throw Some D's" (remix performed by Kanye West) | Polow da Don | 2:36 |
| 23. | "Dreaming of Your Love" (performed by The World Famous Tony Williams) | Kanye West | 2:52 |
| 24. | "Magnetic Power" (performed by Really Doe featuring Jennifer Hudson) | Beaman | 1:47 |
| 25. | "Hater Family" (performed by P.M.) | | 3:36 |
| Total length: | | | 64:25 |

== See also ==
- Kanye West albums discography
- Kanye West production discography
