= Drogas Wave =

Studio album by Lupe Fiasco
- Released: September 21, 2018
- Recorded: 2013–2016
- Studios: FNF Studios in Chicago; Echo Bar Studios in North Hollywood (track 16); NightBird Recording Studios in West Hollywood (track 16)
- Genres: Hip-hop; conscious hip hop
- Length: 98:25
- Labels: 1st & 15; Thirty Tigers; The Orchard
- Producers: Lupe Fiasco (also exec.); Charles "Chilly" Patton (exec.); Abel Garibaldi; Cardiak; Christian Sager; ChristopherKillumbus; DJ Dahi; Dylan James; Floss & Fame; Freeway Tjay; Ian Valentine; Johnny "JT" Thomas, Jr.; shndō; Oren Yoel; Simonsayz; Soundtrakk; S1; T3K; Vohn Beatz

Lupe Fiasco chronology
Drogas Light (2017)	Drogas Wave (2018)	House (2020)

Drogas Wave (stylized as DROGAS WAVE) is the seventh studio album by American hip hop recording artist Lupe Fiasco, released by 1st and 15th Productions and Thirty Tigers on September 21, 2018. This album is a follow-up to his 2017 album, Drogas Light.

== Background ==
Lupe Fiasco announced the album on September 13, 2018, revealing its release date, cover art and track listing via Twitter.

The album is the second part of a planned trilogy of albums, with Drogas Light as its predecessor followed by Skulls, and was slated for a 2016 release with the two albums.

In a 2018 Billboard interview, Fiasco revealed the main idea of the project:

It’s about a group of slaves on a slave ship on their way to Africa to the West Indies and they are thrown off the boat. But they didn’t die. They stayed alive and they lived under the sea. And they dedicated their lives to sinking slave ships -- so they became this super, underwater force against slavery. It’s like a super-deep story that I am building on different fronts. But that’s the main idea and the source material for the album.

In a 2018 Complex interview, Fiasco said:

Drogas Wave is based on a story about a group of slaves that jumped off a slave ship transporting them from Africa. The slaves did not drown, and instead somehow managed to live under the sea. They spent the rest of their underwater existence sinking slave ships. ‘Drogas’ is the Spanish word for drugs. I made it an acronym which stands for ‘Don’t Ruin Us God Said’.

Because of reported leaks, the album release date was released a week early on September 21, 2018, instead of the initial release date, September 28, 2018.

== Songs ==
On March 15, 2013, Fiasco released a song called "Jonylah Forever" on his SoundCloud page in honor of the 6-month-old infant Jonylah Watkins, who was shot five times while her father was changing her diaper in a minivan and imagines what the infant's life could have been had she survived the March 11 shooting.

On October 24, 2014, Fiasco released a song called "Haile Selassie" featuring longtime contributor Nikki Jean in which he stands up for equality and justice. The title is inspired by the late Ethiopian emperor of the same name.

On December 20, 2015, Fiasco teased a song called "Mural Jr." as a sequel to his song "Mural" from Tetsuo and Youth. The song was originally intended to be included on the previous album, Drogas Light.

"Alan Forever" centers around the death of Alan Kurdi in September 2015 during the European migrant crisis. The song tells of an alternate reality where Alan Kurdi does not drown, but instead becomes an Olympic swimmer and later saves a similar boy from drowning. The song is thematically linked to "Jonylah Forever", which also explored an alternative reality of a young child who was killed.

"WAV Files" details the core concept of the album, the Myth of the Long Chains.

== Critical reception ==
Professional ratings
Aggregate scores
Source	Rating
Metacritic	73/100
Review scores
Source	Rating
HipHopDX	3.8/5
HotNewHipHop	85%
Pitchfork	6.2/10
PopMatters	7/10
Tom Hull – on the Web	A−
Vice (Expert Witness)	A−
XXL	3/5

Drogas Wave received generally favorable reviews from critics. At Metacritic, which assigns a normalized rating out of 100 to reviews from mainstream publications, the album received an average score of 73, based on 5 reviews.

== Commercial performance ==
Drogas Wave debuted at number 60 on the US Billboard 200, with first-week sales of 11,099 copies in the United States.

== Track listing ==
Tracklist adapted from iTunes, Qobuz and the album digital booklet.

Part 1: Wave
No.	Title	Writer(s)	Producer(s)	Length
1.	"In the Event of Typhoon"	Wasalu Jaco; Simon Morel	Abel Garibaldi; Simon Sayz	0:18
2.	"Drogas"	Jaco; Davin Boykin; Rudolph Lopez	Lupe Fiasco; Soundtrakk; Dylan James; ChristopherKillumbus	2:16
3.	"Manilla"	Jaco; TJay Walker	Freeway Tjay	5:27
4.	"Gold vs. the Right Things to Do"	Jaco; Larry Griffin, Jr.; Luis Manuel Martinez Jr.	Lupe Fiasco; S1; Shndō	3:42
5.	"Slave Ship" (interlude)	Jaco	Lupe Fiasco	3:31
6.	"WAV Files"	Jaco; Lopez	Lupe Fiasco; Soundtrakk	6:38
7.	"Down" (featuring Nikki Jean)	Jaco; Lopez; Jake West Tayor	Lupe Fiasco; Soundtrakk; Jake West^{[a]}	6:17
8.	"Haile Selassie" (featuring Nikki Jean)	Jaco; Lopez	Lupe Fiasco; Soundtrakk	4:49
9.	"Alan Forever" (featuring Crystal "Røvél" Torres)	Jaco; Boykin	Lupe Fiasco; ChristopherKillumbus	4:44
Total length:				37:42

Part 2: Drogas
No.	Title	Writer(s)	Producer(s)	Length
10.	"Helter Skelter" (interlude)	Jaco	Lupe Fiasco	0:16
11.	"Stronger" (featuring Nikki Jean)	Jaco; Dylan James; Nicholle Leary; Lopez	Lupe Fiasco; T3K; Soundtrakk^{[a]}; James^{[a]}	4:05
12.	"Sun God Sam & the California Drug Deals" (featuring Nikki Jean)	Jaco; Javohn Griffin; Leary; Carl McCormick; Christian Sager	Lupe Fiasco; Christian Sager; Vohn Beatz; Cardiak^{[a]}	4:44
13.	"XO" (featuring Troi Irons)	Jaco; Troi Irons; Morel; Ian Valentine	Lupe Fiasco; Simon Sayz; IValentine	4:31
14.	"Don't Mess Up the Children" (interlude)	Jaco	Lupe Fiasco	0:45
15.	"Jonylah Forever"	Jaco; Lopez	Lupe Fiasco; Soundtrakk	3:45
16.	"Kingdom" (featuring Damian Marley)	Jaco; Damian Marley; Dacoury Natche; Oren Yoel	Lupe Fiasco; DJ Dahi; Yoel	4:45
17.	"Baba Kwesi" (interlude)	Jaco	Lupe Fiasco	0:35
18.	"Imagine" (featuring Simon Sayz and Crystal "Røvél" Torres)	Jaco; Morel; Valentine	Lupe Fiasco; Simon Sayz; Valentine	4:07
19.	"Stack That Cheese" (featuring Nikki Jean)	Jaco; Derrick Disu; James Fatora	Lupe Fiasco; Floss & Fame	4:13
20.	"Cripple" (featuring Elena Pinderhughes)	Jaco; Lopez	Lupe Fiasco; Soundtrakk	4:51
21.	"King Nas"	Jaco; Lopez	Lupe Fiasco; Soundtrakk; Jon Content^{[a]}	5:57
22.	"Quotations from Chairman Fred" (featuring Nikki Jean and Bishop Edgar Jackson)	Jaco; Leary; Griffin	Lupe Fiasco; Vohn Beatz	7:09
23.	"Happy Timbuck2 Day"	Jaco; Morel	Lupe Fiasco; Simon Sayz; Valentine	5:48
24.	"Mural Jr."	Jaco; Johnny "JT" Thomas Jr.	Lupe Fiasco; Thomas	5:12
Total length:				60:43

Notes

- ^{^[a]} signifies an additional producer(s)
- "Drogas" features additional vocals by Letty Martinez.
- "Manilla" features additional vocals by Reginald "Lil Reggie" Strong.
- "Slave Ship (Interlude)" features violin played by American violinist Rosy Timms.
- "Haile Selassie" features additional vocals by Kwayland Smith.
- "Alan Forever" features additional vocals by Dylan James.
- "Stronger" features additional vocals by Dylan Jones.

== Charts ==
Chart (2018)	Peak position
Australian Digital Albums (ARIA)	43
US Billboard 200	60
US Top R&B/Hip-Hop Albums (Billboard)	33
