= Lasers (album) =

Studio album by Lupe Fiasco
- Released: March 7, 2011
- Recorded: 2008–2010
- Genre: Hip-hop
- Length: 57:03
- Labels: 1st & 15th; Atlantic
- Producers: Lupe Fiasco (exec.); Charles "Chilly" Patton (exec.); Darrale Jones (co-exec.); The Audibles; Alex da Kid; iSHi; The Buchanans; Kane Beatz; King David; Needlz; The Neptunes; Soundtrakk; Jerry Duplessis; Syience; Arden Altino; Miykal Snoddy

Lupe Fiasco chronology
Lupe Fiasco's The Cool (2007)	Lasers (2011)	Food & Liquor II: The Great American Rap Album Pt. 1 (2012)

Singles from Lasers
- 1. "The Show Goes On" Released: October 26, 2010; 2. "Words I Never Said" Released: February 8, 2011; 3. "Out of My Head" Released: May 22, 2011; 4. "I Don't Wanna Care Right Now" Released: December 2, 2011

Lasers is the third studio album by American rapper Lupe Fiasco, released on March 7, 2011, by 1st & 15th Entertainment and Atlantic Records. Production for the album took place between 2008 and 2010. Lasers features production by The Audibles, The Neptunes, Needlz, Alex da Kid, Syience, and long-time collaborator Soundtrakk, among others. Trey Songz, John Legend, Skylar Grey, Sway, Matt Mahaffey, MDMA, Eric Turner and Sarah Green contribute vocals to the album.

Lasers was preceded by the lead single "The Show Goes On" and its follow-up "Words I Never Said" featuring Skylar Grey. The former became Fiasco's highest charting song on the Billboard Hot 100 and has been certified double Platinum in the US. The latter, however, only achieved moderate success on the Hot 100.

The album has received mixed reviews from most major music critics, having a score of 57 out of 100 at the review aggregator Metacritic. It fared well commercially however, debuting at number one on the US Billboard 200 with first-week sales of over 200,000 copies sold, making the album Fiasco's second top ten album as well as his highest entry on the chart.

== Background ==
Lupe Fiasco was supposedly going to release a triple album, titled LupE.N.D. as his third and final record, but his contract with Atlantic Records prevented him from doing so. From then he postponed LupE.N.D. indefinitely and intended on releasing an album tentatively titled The Great American Rap Album in June 2009. Instead, the album was also postponed and he announced that a new album was in the works, originally titled We Are Lasers and then changed to Lasers. "Lasers" is a backronym for "Love Always Shines Everytime, Remember 2 Smile". Referring to the title of the album, Fiasco has stated: "I've always had that word in my head, I'm a word guy. And I thought 'lasers' would be a dope name for an album, so when I came up with it I just put it in my 'think-tank' and let it evolve and came up with different meanings for it. That's why I made it an acronym [sic] to give it a new mould, a new understanding, but still playing off the idea that it's bringing light to different circumstances which is what I try and do – bringing understanding and light and awareness to different projects that are going on in the world, and 'L.A.S.E.R.S' is no different.

In 2010, to promote the message of the album, Fiasco released a viral video onto the internet titled "The L.A.S.E.R.S. Manifesto", which can be found on both YouTube and the official website. The manifesto reads:

To every man, woman & child... We want an end to the glamorization of negativity in the media. We want an end to status symbols dictating our worth as individuals. We want a meaningful and universal education system. We want substance in the place of popularity. We will not compromise who we are to be accepted by the crowd. We want the invisible walls that separate by wealth, race & class to be torn down. We want to think our own thoughts. We will be responsible for our environment. We want clarity & truth from our elected officials or they should move aside. We want love not lies. We want an end to all wars foreign & domestic violence. We want an end to the processed culture of exploitation, over-consumption & waste. We want knowledge, understanding & peace. We will not lose because we are not losers, we are lasers! Lasers are revolutionary. Lasers are the future.

On January 4, 2011, Billboard revealed two guest appearances on Fiasco's album Lasers. The guests confirmed were Trey Songz and British rapper Sway. In the interview with Billboard, Fiasco expressed his thoughts on music piracy and fighting track leaks on various blogs. Speaking about the problems with his record label, Fiasco has stated: "I think I set the precedent for record labels — showed everyone that you can have rappers that don't fit the format and still have a presence [...] You look at a person like me, or Kanye [West], and it was sort of a shock to the system. I definitely think I was part of changing that, and an influence to a lot dudes that are coming out today."

In a 2011 interview with MTV UK, Fiasco said that the album "doesn't have a storyline, whereas The Cool was a concept album and this is more just a collection of songs that share some of the same tones, which is basically just positivity and consciousness. Some of the records are controversial, but it's less cohesive than The Cool." Talking about the album with Details, Fiasco has stated that he wanted to make "a popular record [...] but by my definition of popular [...] an uprising of the people". He has also stated that the creation of the album was "a very painful, dark, fucked-up process."

In a February 2011 interview with Complex, Fiasco has stated:

One thing I try to stress about this project is, I love and hate this album. I listen to it and I'll like some of the songs. But when I think about what it took to actually get the record together and everything that I went through on this record – which is something I can't separate – I hate this album. A lot of the songs that are on the album, I'm kinda neutral to. Not that I don't like them, or that I hate them, it's just I know the process that went behind it. I know the sneaky business deal that went down behind this song, or the artist or singer or songwriter who wrote this hook and didn't want to give me this song in the first place. So when I have that kind of knowledge behind it, I'm just kind of neutral to it like, "Another day, another dollar". As opposed something like The Cool, which is more of my own blood, sweat, and tears, and my own control. With this record, I'm little bit more neutral as to the love for the record. I don't like the process behind Lasers. The music is dope but I just don't like the process. We were literally at the point where all this music was done except for a couple songs that we did after the protest. So the bulk of the album was done. And we were talking about shelving the album and going to another label, that's where we were like, "If you put the record out, put it out. Either move on to another album or can it and we'll do other records at another label." The business of it got solved. I'm happy for the fans, this is their album. This is the album that they fought for and that's what made me do songs like "Words I Never Said" and "All Black Everything".

Speaking about the album with the Chicago Sun-Times, Fiasco has stated: "Lasers is a great album. I'm actually happy with the record. I feel I got to say what I wanted even with – It doesn't make up for what it took to get through it. It's still being argued and debated upon. ... The climate of this record was very weird, in some instances surreal. I became very abstract. I had to create this commercial art that appeases the corporate side. I had to acquiesce to certain forces. Hopefully within that I snuck in some things I actually wanted to say any way I can." In an interview with The Guardian, Fiasco has expressed that during the recording process of the album he has dealt with depression and suicidal thoughts: "It was mentally destructive. I say it with a certain laissez-faire now because I'm past it [...]. I was super-depressed, lightly suicidal, at moments medium suicidal – and if not suicidal, willing to just walk away from it all completely." A remix of the song "All Black Everything" featuring Chamillionaire was released in April 2011 for free download.

== Release conflict and petition ==
Lupe Fiasco had announced on Twitter that the album was complete and was waiting for Atlantic Records to release it. A fan awaiting the release of the album, put together an online petition with the help of Rhymestyle from the "LupEND Blog" fan site, demanding that Atlantic Records release Lasers, due to the fact that the album was announced for a 2010 release and at the time still did not have a release date. The petition garnered considerable attention on hip hop blog sites and attained over 5,000 signatures on its first day. In response to the petition, Lupe Fiasco released a song titled "B.M.F. (Building Minds Faster)" (a remix of "B.M.F. (Blowin' Money Fast)" by Rick Ross) as a gift for his fans. The story was featured on many websites, including CNN and MTV. On October 7, 2010, Lupe Fiasco posted a picture of himself with Atlantic president, Julie Greenwald. On October 8, Atlantic Records revealed that the release date for Lasers would be March 8, 2011. Even though the release date of the album had been confirmed prior, a number of fans protested outside Atlantic Records' offices in New York City on October 15, 2010. Protest co-organizer Matthew La Corte has told The Village Voice that it should be considered as a "celebration of the release and everyone's hard work". Lupe Fiasco also attended, and gave a speech.

Speaking in a March 2011 interview with New York about the support that his fans have given him to release the album, Fiasco has said: "It was amazing, humbling, and inspiring, to the point where I went back in the studio and did more records … it made everything real, that your music is actually something that people want. And it's something that is successful, not in selling records, but the way it moves people and inspires them to do better for themselves."

== Singles and leaked material ==
During a concert at Boston College, Fiasco played the chorus of a song called "Shining Down", which eventually led to a snippet being leaked onto the internet. On May 17, 2009, a low quality version of the single leaked onto the internet, possibly stemming from a rip from the "FNF TV Stream". "Shining Down" was intended to be the first single from Everywhere, the first of the three CDs that LupE.N.D. would have been composed of. But because its release was withheld, there was speculation circulating that it may be the first single from Lasers. Fiasco later confirmed that it is in fact the first single from the album. The song was produced by Soundtrakk and featured Matthew Santos, in the same collaborative manner that Fiasco featured Santos on his hit lead single, "Superstar" from his second album, Lupe Fiasco's The Cool. It was released on July 7, 2009. The song had received mixed reviews, with Pitchfork Media giving it a 5/10 rating, calling it a "bland refix of The Cool's first single". "Shining Down" did not do as well as Fiasco had hoped for, charting only at number 93 on the Billboard Hot 100 during its initial run.

In a February 2010 interview with Australian radio station Triple J, Fiasco revealed that although the album had been submitted to his label, they still had no solid release date for it. He stated: "It's one of the sadder parts of being on a major record label. At a certain point it's out of your hands. About a date for Lasers, it's truly on them. I have no idea what they're going to do." It has also been reported that Fiasco had initially recorded B.o.B's "Nothin' on You" as well as "Airplanes" featuring Hayley Williams, but both songs had been rejected by Fiasco's label. Another unreleased song from Lasers was "Who Are You Now" featuring B.o.B, which has leaked onto the internet in March 2011.

=== Singles ===
On October 26, 2010, the official lead single from Lasers, "The Show Goes On", premiered on Fiasco's official website after the initial debut single "I'm Beaming" was removed from the iTunes store and demoted to a deluxe edition bonus track. It was produced by Kane Beatz and interpolates Modest Mouse's "Float On" as part of the chorus. The music video for the single was directed by Hiro Murai and premiered on Fiasco's official website on Christmas day, December 25, 2010. As of June 2011, the song has been certified double Platinum in the United States by the RIAA for selling over two million copies, thus making it his second single to go Platinum and first to go double Platinum. "The Show Goes On" has peaked at number nine on the Billboard Hot 100, becoming his highest-charting song on the Hot 100. On other Billboard charts, "The Show Goes On" has peaked at number 45 on the Hot R&B/Hip-Hop Songs chart, 14 on the Pop Songs chart and five on the Hot Rap Songs chart. In Australia, it peaked at number five on the Australian Singles Chart and has since been certified Gold for selling over 35,000 units. In Europe, the single has charted on the Irish Singles Chart where it peaked at number 19, as well as on the UK Singles Chart peaking at number 49.

On January 11, 2011, Fiasco revealed during an interview with Providence's Hot 106 that the follow-up single to "The Show Goes On" is titled "Words I Never Said", he said about the song that "It's gonna be really big. It's a big, controversial record". The song was produced by Alex da Kid and features American singer-songwriter Skylar Grey. "Words I Never Said" was released as a digital download on February 8, 2011. It has since peaked at number 89 on the US Billboard Hot 100. A teaser trailer for the Sanaa Hamri-directed music video was released in January 2011, while the full clip premiered on April 28, 2011.

"Out of My Head" featuring American R&B singer Trey Songz was confirmed as the album's third single. The song was released on May 10, 2011 and has since peaked at number 40 on the US Billboard Hot 100, 11 on the Hot R&B/Hip-Hop Songs chart and four on the Hot Rap Songs chart. The official single cover was revealed on May 23, 2011. Fiasco and Songz performed "Out of My Head" live for the first time at the 2011 MTV Movie Awards on June 5, 2011. The music video for the single, directed by Gil Green, was released on June 29, 2011.

"I Don't Wanna Care Right Now", featuring MDMA, was confirmed to be the album's fourth single. The single's official music video was released on December 2, 2011 on YouTube. The video was filmed during a concert at Iowa State University.

== Critical reception ==
Professional ratings
Aggregate scores
Source	Rating
AnyDecentMusic?	5.3/10
Metacritic	57/100
Review scores
Source	Rating
AllMusic	3/5 stars
Chicago Tribune	2.5/4 stars
Entertainment Weekly	A−
The Guardian	2/5 stars
The Independent	2/5 stars
Los Angeles Times	2.5/4 stars
Pitchfork	3.0/10
Rolling Stone	3.5/5 stars
Slant Magazine	2.5/5 stars
Spin	6/10

Lasers received mixed reviews from most music critics. At Metacritic, which assigns a normalized rating out of 100 to reviews from mainstream critics, the album received an average score of 57, based on 27 reviews, which indicates "mixed or average reviews". AllMusic editor Andy Kellman gave it three out of five stars and criticized its "lumbering, overwrought choruses", writing that "If there is one MC whose rhymes should not be dulled for the sake of chasing pop trends, it's Lupe Fiasco". Jeff Leven of Paste gave Lasers a six out of 10 rating and found its musical arrangements polished and "radio-friendly". The Guardian's Alex Macpherson viewed its content as a concession to pop music trends, panning its "synthy choruses" and "trite empowerment anthems". Andy Gill of The Independent gave the album two out of five stars and criticized Fiasco's lyrics, stating "while his flow has a nice bounce and monotonal glide, too many tracks end with one wondering what exactly he's said, if anything at all". David Amidon of PopMatters panned the album as "a disgustingly awkward effort from everyone involved [...] Listenability? Credibility? These, Lasers is lacking in seismic qualities". Brandon Soderberg of Spin found it to be affected by crossover tendencies and wrote that "Lasers works best, however, when the grabby hooks, electro beats, and conscious rap rants are all turned down a notch". Los Angeles Times writer Todd Martens shared a similar sentiment and commented that the album "feels more like a compromise than a cohesive album". Pitchfork's Ian Cohen criticized the album for "surveying the current pop-rap landscape and retaining nothing worthwhile", commenting that "Lasers simply sounds bad, playing against every single one of Lupe Fiasco's strengths and creating new weaknesses".

However, Entertainment Weekly's Brad Wete complimented its themes and stated "Simply put, Lasers beams". Rolling Stone writer Jon Dolan noted Fiasco's "athletic, whiplash flow and rich imagination" and found the album "shorter, brighter and – most admirably – more optimistic" than his previous album The Cool. Despite writing that "RnB syrup starts to swamp the lyrical invention", BBC Music's Johnny Sharp noted "several inspired moments" and commented that "Lupe remains a singular hip hop voice, and Lasers is still worth a listen". Carrie Battan of The Boston Globe viewed that "the album's real sweet spots lie somewhere in the brief, breezy middle ground" between "angsty rap-metal crossover tracks" and "clubby, bass-thumping radio-rap jams". The A.V. Club's Kyle Ryan gave the album a B− and commented that its synthesizers "[give] it an au courant hip-hop sound", but criticized its lyrics and called it "schizophrenic". Steve Jones of USA Today gave the album three out of four stars and wrote that it "has several shining moments but falls short of the overall excellence" of his previous albums. Chicago Tribune writer Greg Kot gave the album two-and-half out of four stars and stated "Its best music shows what it might have been. The rest feels more like an obligation reluctantly met, a difficult bridge to the next phase of Lupe Fiasco's career". Jon Caramanica of The New York Times expressed a mixed response towards its music and called Lasers "a chaotic album full of gummy rhymes that look better on the page than they sound to the ear, delivered with a tone of tragic bombast". Slant Magazine's Matthew Cole perceived "no bridging the gap between Lasers's radical message and its utterly conventional sound", commenting that "In moments of dazzling clarity, Lupe spits hip-hop prophecy, but too much of Lasers is given over to self-serious jeremiads on race, rap, and politics, or pop-rap pandering".

== Commercial performance ==
The album debuted at number one on the US Billboard 200 chart, with first-week sales of 204,000 copies. Lasers marks Fiasco's first number one album on the chart as well as his best selling first-week sales. The album is Fiasco's second top ten album on the chart with his first album, Food & Liquor, debuting at number eight in 2006, and The Cool debuting at number 15 in 2007. In its second week on the chart, it fell to number three selling 47,000 units, while in its third week, it fell to number ten selling an additional 29,000 copies. As of August 10, 2011, Lasers has sold approximately 452,000 copies in the United States. Internationally, Lasers has debuted within the top ten on the Australian and Canadian album charts, while also peaking at number 11 in New Zealand and number 25 in the United Kingdom. On March 23, 2014, the album was certified Gold by the Recording Industry Association of America for shipments of 500,000 copies. On February 27, 2025, it became certified Platinum.

== Track listing ==
No.	Title	Writer(s)	Producer(s)	Length
1.	"Letting Go" (featuring Sarah Green)	Wasalu Jaco; David "King David" Manzoor	King David	4:26
2.	"Words I Never Said" (featuring Skylar Grey)	Jaco; Holly Hafermann; Alexander Grant	Alex da Kid	4:16
3.	"Till I Get There"	Jaco; Khari Cain; Ricky Rutland; Khalil Walton	Needlz	3:23
4.	"I Don't Wanna Care Right Now" (featuring MDMA)	Jaco; Jason "Poo Bear" Boyd; Jimmy Gannos; Dominic Jordan	The Audibles	4:15
5.	"Out of My Head" (featuring Trey Songz)	Jaco; Arden Altino; Jerry Duplessis; Ronnie Jackson; Jesse Wilson; Miykal Snoddy	Miykal Snoddy	3:24
6.	"The Show Goes On"	Jaco; Isaac Brock; Dustin Brower; Jonathon Brown; Dann Gallucci; Daniel Johnson; Eric Judy	Kane Beatz	3:56
7.	"Beautiful Lasers (2 Ways)" (featuring MDMA)	Jaco; Boyd; Manzoor	King David	4:01
8.	"Coming Up" (featuring MDMA)	Jaco; Boyd; Manzoor	King David	3:58
9.	"State Run Radio" (featuring Matt Mahaffey as sElf)	Jaco; Manzoor	King David	3:57
10.	"Break the Chain" (featuring Eric Turner and Sway)	Jaco; Eric Turner; Eshraque Mughal; Derek Safo	iSHi	4:21
11.	"All Black Everything"	Jaco; Wizzo Buchanan; Sammy Fain; Irving Kahal	The Buchanans	3:40
12.	"Never Forget You" (featuring John Legend)	Jaco; Altino; Duplessis; John Stephens; Reginald Perry	Jerry Duplessis; Syience; Arden Altino	4:04

Deluxe bonus tracks
No.	Title	Writer(s)	Producer(s)	Length
13.	"I'm Beamin'"	Jaco; Pharrell Williams; Chad Hugo	The Neptunes	4:48
14.	"Shining Down" (featuring Matthew Santos)	Jaco; Matthew Santos; Rudolph Lopez	Soundtrakk	4:34

== Personnel ==
Credits for Lasers adapted from Tidal, AllMusic, and Genius.com.

Musicians

- Wasalu "Lupe Fiasco" Jaco – vocals (all tracks)
- Sarah Green – featured artist (track 1)
- Holly "Skylar Grey" Hafermann – featured artist (track 2)
- Bradley Bowden – drum programmer (track 3)
- Ricky Rutland – keyboards (track 3)
- Jason "MDMA" Boyd – featured artist (tracks 4, 7–8)
- Jerry "Wonda" Duplessis – bass guitar (track 5)
- Tremaine "Trey Songz" Neverson – featured artist (track 5)
- Daniel "Kane Beatz" Johnson – additional vocals (track 6)
- JR Get Money – additional vocals (track 6)
- Dan Manzoor – bass (tracks 7–8); guitar (track 7)
- David "King David" Manzoor – drums & keyboards (tracks 7–9)
- Trevor Astey – guitar (track 8)
- Matt "sELF" Mahaffey – featured artist (track 9)
- Michael Herring – bass & guitar (track 9)
- Prescott Ellison – drums (track 9)
- Eric Turner – featured artist (track 10)
- Derek "Sway" Safo – featured artist (track 10)
- John "John Legend" Stephens – featured artist (track 12)
- Matthew Santos – featured artist (track 14)

Production

- Lupe Fiasco – songwriting (all tracks)
- Brian "Big Bass" Gardner – mastering (all tracks)
- Joe Peluso – additional engineering (tracks 1–4, 10, 12); recording (tracks 1, 3, 9); mixing (tracks 1, 3–4, 7–8)
- King David – songwriting, production (tracks 1, 7–9)
- Josh Berg – mixing assistance (tracks 1, 7)
- Tucker Robinson – (tracks 1, 3)
- Skylar Grey – songwriting, vocal engineering, vocal production (track 2)
- Alexander "Alex da Kid" Grant – songwriting, production (track 2)
- Manny Marroquinn – mixing (track 2)
- Erik Madrid – mixing assistance (track 2)
- Blast Off Productions – recording (track 2)
- Khari "Needlz" Cain – songwriting, production (track 3)
- Ricky Rutland – songwriting (track 3)
- Khalil "Saint Cassius" Walton – songwriting (track 3)
- MDMA – songwriting (tracks 4, 7–8); production (track 7)
- Jimmy "Jimmy G" Giannos – songwriting (track 4)
- Dominic "DJ Mecca" Jordan – songwriting (track 4)
- The Audibles – production (track 4)
- Greg "G-Ball" Magers – recording (tracks 4, 10–11)
- Angelo Caputo – additional recording (track 4)
- Jerry "Wonda" Duplessis – songwriting (track 5); production (tracks 4, 12)
- Arden "Keyz" Altino – songwriting (tracks 5, 12); co-production (track 5); production (track 12)
- Ronnie Jackson – songwriting (track 5)
- Jesse Wilson – songwriting (track 5)
- Michael "Miykal" Snoddy – songwriting, production (track 5)
- Serge Tsai – recording (tracks 5, 12); mixing (track 12)
- Koby Hass – recording (track 5)
- Nathaniel "You Can Ask Giz" Robinson – mixing (track 5)
- Kane Beatz – songwriting, production (track 6)
- Isaac Brock – songwriting (track 6)
- Dustin Brower – songwriting (track 6)
- Jonathon Brown – songwriting (track 6)
- Dann Gallucci – songwriting (track 6)
- Eric Judy – songwriting (track 6)
- Dave Pensado – mixing (track 6)
- Jaycen-Joshua Fowler – mixing (track 6)
- Trevor Astey – additional engineering (track 7); recording (track 9)
- Claudio Cuenti – recording (track 7)
- Ghazi Hourani – engineering assistance (track 9)
- Matt Mahaffey – vocal engineering, vocal production (track 9)
- Eshraque "iSHi" Mughal – songwriting, production (track 10)
- Eric Turner – songwriting (track 10)
- Sway – songwriting (track 10)
- The Buchanans – production (track 11)
- Wizzo Buchanan – songwriting, production (track 11)
- Cory Buchanan – co-production (track 11)
- Sammy Fain – songwriting (track 11)
- Irving Kahal – songwriting (track 11)
- John Legend – songwriting (track 12)
- Reginald "Syience" Perry – production (track 12)
- Gabe Robles – mixing assistance (track 12)
- Warren Babson – mixing assistance (track 12); recording (track 12)
- Pharrell Williams – songwriting (track 13)
- Chad Hugo – songwriting (track 13)
- The Neptunes – production (track 13)
- Ramon Rivas – engineering assistance (track 13)
- Andrew Coleman – digital editing, recording (track 13)
- Fabian Marasciullo – mixing (track 13)
- Rudolph "Soundtrakk" Lopez – songwriting, production (track 14)

Visuals and design

- Rob Gold – art manager
- OAK – art direction, design
- Janice Kinjo – grooming
- Andrew Zaeh – photography
- Brian Ranney – package production

Managerial

- Lupe Fiasco – executive production
- Charles "Chilly" Patton – executive production, management
- Darrale Jones – co-executive production
- Deborah Mannis-Gardner – sample clearance
- Marsha St. Hubert – marketer
- Cara Donatto – publicity

== Charts ==
=== Weekly charts ===
Chart (2011)	Peak position
Australian Albums (ARIA)	4
Australian Urban Albums (ARIA)	2
Canadian Albums (Billboard)	4
Dutch Albums (Album Top 100)	52
French Albums (SNEP)	145
Irish Albums (IRMA)	27
New Zealand Albums (RMNZ)	11
Scottish Albums (Official Charts)	39
UK Albums (Official Charts)	25
UK R&B Albums (Official Charts)	4
US Billboard 200	1
US Top R&B/Hip-Hop Albums (Billboard)	1

=== Year-end charts ===
Chart (2011)	Position
US Billboard 200	59
US Top R&B/Hip-Hop Albums (Billboard)	15

== Certifications ==
Certifications for Lasers
Region	Certification	Certified units/sales
United States (RIAA)	Platinum	1,000,000^{‡}
^{‡} Sales+streaming figures based on certification alone.

== Release history ==
Region	Date	Label	Format
Australia	March 4, 2011	Warner Music Group	CD, digital download
United Kingdom	March 7, 2011	Atlantic Records	CD, digital download
France	March 7, 2011	Atlantic Records	CD, digital download
United States	March 8, 2011	Atlantic Records	CD, digital download
Canada	March 8, 2011	Warner Music Group	CD, digital download
Japan	March 23, 2011		CD, digital download
Germany	April 29, 2011	Atlantic Records	CD, digital download
Austria	April 29, 2011	Atlantic Records	CD, digital download
Switzerland	April 29, 2011	Atlantic Records	CD, digital download
