= I'm Beamin' =

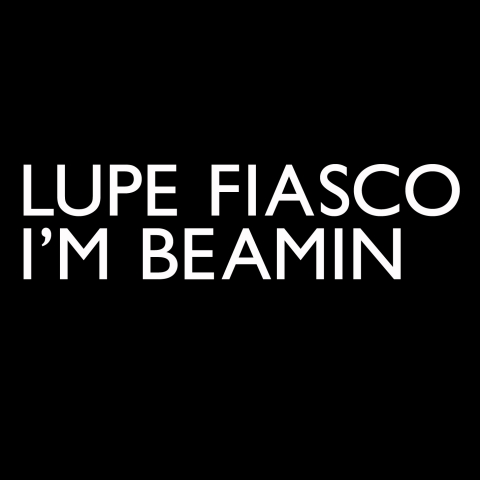

Single by Lupe Fiasco
- Released: January 13, 2010
- Recorded: 2009
- Genre: Hip hop
- Length: 4:41
- Label: 1st & 15th; Atlantic
- Songwriters: Wasalu Muhammad Jaco; Pharrell Williams; Chad Hugo
- Producer: The Neptunes

"I'm Beamin'" is a song written by rapper Lupe Fiasco. The Neptunes-produced track was released in January 2010. The song is included on the bonus track version of Lupe Fiasco's third studio album Lasers, which was released on March 8, 2011.

== Music video ==
The video was released on April 26, 2010, on Lupe's YouTube channel.

== Remix ==
A remix of the song was released on October 13, 2010, entitled "We Beamin'" featuring members of the supergroup All City Chess Club (excluding J. Cole, Wale), and Pharrell. The song is 8 minutes long with every members having verses. The song was included on All City Chess Club member B.o.B's 2010 mixtape No Genre.
