= I Don't Wanna Care Right Now =

Single by Lupe Fiasco featuring MDMA

from the album Lasers
- Released: December 2, 2011
- Recorded: 2010
- Genre: Hip hop
- Length: 4:15
- Label: 1st & 15th; Atlantic
- Songwriters: Wasalu Jaco; Jason Boyd; Jimmy Giannos; Dominic Jordan
- Producer: The Audibles

"I Don't Wanna Care Right Now" is a song by American rapper Lupe Fiasco, featuring MDMA. It was released as the fourth and final single from Fiasco's third studio album Lasers.

== Music video ==
The song's official music video was released on December 2, 2011, on YouTube. The video was filmed during a concert at Iowa State University.

== Chart performance ==
"I Don't Wanna Care Right Now" debuted at No. 12 on the Bubbling Under Hot 100 Singles chart.

Chart (2011)	Peak position
Australia (ARIA)	71
Canada Hot 100 (Billboard)	78
US Bubbling Under Hot 100 (Billboard)	12
