= Shining Down =

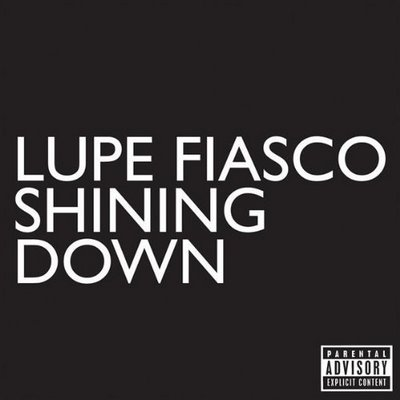

Promotional single by Lupe Fiasco featuring Matthew Santos

from the album Lasers
- Released: July 7, 2009
- Recorded: 2009
- Length: 4:34
- Label: 1st & 15th; Atlantic
- Songwriter(s): Wasalu Jaco; Rudolph Lopez
- Producer(s): Soundtrakk

"Shining Down" is a song by Lupe Fiasco. It was intended to be the first single of Everywhere, the first of three CDs of Lupe Fiasco's triple album, Lupe Fiasco's LupE.N.D., but because of its release being withheld, there was speculation circulating that it may be the first single of his third album, Lasers. The song, however, was only included in the iTunes deluxe version of the album and was considered a promotional single. The song is produced by Soundtrakk and features Matthew Santos, in the same collaborative manner in which the lead single "Superstar" was composed for Lupe's critically acclaimed second album Lupe Fiasco's The Cool.

This song appears in the video game Need for Speed: Hot Pursuit.

== Releases ==
On May 17, 2009, a low quality version of the single leaked onto the internet, possibly stemming from a rip of the "FNF TV Stream". On June 16, the unmastered version of the song leaked. Fiasco stated that he was angry at the leak, and Matthew Santos further elaborated that the leaked track was not the final, mastered mix. The final, official version of the song was released to iTunes on July 7, 2009. Its peak position on the Billboard Hot 100 was no. 93.

== Charts ==
Chart (2009)	Peak position
US Billboard Hot 100	93
