= Glorious Game =

Studio album by El Michels Affair and Black Thought
- Released: April 14, 2023
- Genre: Hip-hop
- Length: 31:00
- Label: Big Crown
- Producer: El Michels Affair

El Michels Affair chronology
Ekundayo Inversions (2021)	Glorious Game (2023)

Black Thought chronology
Cheat Codes (2022)	Glorious Game (2023)

Singles from Glorious Game
- 1. "Grateful" Released: Jan 11, 2023; 2. "That Girl" Released: Feb 14, 2023; 3. "Glorious Game (feat. KIRBY)" Released: Mar 6, 2023; 4. "I'm Still Somehow" Released: Mar 29, 2023

Glorious Game is a collaborative studio album by American soul group El Michels Affair and American emcee Black Thought, released on April 14, 2023, by Big Crown Records.

== Background ==
On January 11, 2023, Black Thought announced that a collaborative album with El Michels Affair titled Glorious Game would be releasing on April 14, 2023, and released the first single for the album "Grateful". Black Thought and El Michels Affiar began working on the album in 2020, during the COVID-19 pandemic. The album features Michels' close collaborators and artists from his record label Big Crown, including Lady Wray, Brainstory, and Paul Spring.

On February 14, the second single for the album, "That Girl", was released. On March 6, the third single for the album, "Glorious Game", was released, featuring singer Kirby. On March 29, the fourth single for the album, "I'm Still Somehow", was released. The album was released on April 14.

== Content ==
Black Thought has described Glorious Game as "one of my most personal projects to date", and has stated that his goal for the album was to have every song tell a story from or about his life. Bandcamp Daily characterizes Black Thought as "in an introspective mood" on the album. The title Glorious Game is a term for "information passed down from... an elder statesman with a cautionary tale here and there". The decision to include a reprise of the title track was inspired by musical theater.

In producing the album, Leon Michels wrote several original songs and then, rather than using those songs directly, created hip-hop beats that sampled them.

== Critical reception ==
Professional ratings
Aggregate scores
Source	Rating
Metacritic	81/100
Review scores
Source	Rating
AllMusic	4/5 stars
Clash	8/10
HipHopDX	4.6/5
Loud and Quiet	6/10
PopMatters	7/10
Under the Radar	7.5/10

Upon release, Glorious Game was met with critical acclaim. At Metacritic, which assigns a normalized rating out of 100 to reviews from professional publications, the album received an average score of 81, based on seven reviews.

Writing for Under the Radar, Chris Thiessen writes "Glorious Game pays homage to hip-hop's lineage of soul, funk, and boom-bap," and praises Black Thought's lyricism, saying "In both the familiar and the unexpected, Black Thought is perfectly at ease. He finds ample room and inspiration in Michels' thoughtful production to reflect on his life." Robin Murray at Clash praised El Michels Affair's production, writing, "A word, too, for the ever-resistant consistency that cinematic soul outfit El Michels Affair apply to their art – the group's third album in three years, they never once let standards slip." Riley Wallace of HipHopDX commended Black Thought's storytelling, writing, "Playing out as a stage-worthy one-person show, Thought remains endearingly personal throughout the tightly curated 31-minute project, walking us through the sights, sounds, smells and sensibilities instilled coming up in the Point Breeze neighborhood of South Philadelphia." AllMusic's Andy Kellman praised Black Thought's writing on the album, stating: "While Thought remains unrelentingly stern in his delivery, his rhymes remain packed with comic references and imagery contradicting his improper classification as one of hip-hop's most sullen and humorless MCs." Writing for PopMatters, Chris Conaton concludes his review stating "This project is worth checking out, with excellent production and even better verses." KCRW's Jeremy Sole writes of the album "Together, these master craftsmen bring a depth and introspection so needed in this world today. The album not only transmutes pain and struggle into beauty and wisdom, but does so in a way that we can ride to it, slow and low, calm and collected."

=== Year-end lists ===
Critics' rankings for Glorious Game
Publication	Accolade	Rank	Ref.
KCRW	The 23 Best Albums of 2023	14	
The Philadelphia Inquirer	Best Albums of 2023	2	
Under the Radar	Top 100 Albums of 2023	67	
Uproxx	The Best Albums Of 2023	—N/a	

== Track listing ==
All tracks are written by Tariq Trotter, except where noted, and produced by Leon Michels.

Glorious Game track listing
No.	Title	Writer(s)	Length
1.	"Grateful"	Cleveland Browne; Greville Gordon; Homer Steinweiss; Leon Michels; Nick Movshon; Rexton Gordon; Tariq Trotter; Wycliff Johnson	2:51
2.	"Glorious Game" (featuring Kirby)	Eric Hagstorm; Kevin Martin; Kirby Lauryen Dockery; Michels; Trotter; Tony Martin	3:53
3.	"I'm Still Somehow"	Joni Mitchell; Michels; Trotter	2:04
4.	"Hollow Way"	Eddie Holloway; Erkin Koray; Jake Graffagnino; Michels; Trotter	2:24
5.	"Protocol" (featuring Son Little)	Paul Spring; Son Little; Steinweiss; Movshon; Michels; Trotter	2:56
6.	"The Weather"	Paul Casteluzzo; Movshon; Michels; Trotter	2:59
7.	"That Girl"	Steinweiss; K. Martin; Michels; Movshon; Spring; Trotter	2:10
8.	"I Would Never"	Steinweiss; K. Martin; Michels; Movshon; Spring; Trotter	2:43
9.	"Alone"	Dave Guy; K. Martin; Michels; Movshon; Trotter	2:06
10.	"Miracle"	Michels; Movshon; Trotter	2:32
11.	"Glorious Game (Reprise)"	Guy; Hagstorm; K. Martin; T. Martin; Michels; Dockery	1:23
12.	"Alter Ego" (featuring Brainstory)	Hagstorm; K. Martin; T. Martin; Michels; Trotter	3:10
Total length:			31:16

- Additional production on "Glorious Game" by Brainstory
- Additional production on "The Weather" by Paul Castelluzzo

=== Samples ===
- "Grateful" contains samples from "Ting-A-Ling", by Shabba Ranks.

== Personnel ==
Musicians

- Leon Michels – drums, bass, guitar, keys, flute, sax, percussion, vocals
- Nick Movshon – drums, bass
- Homer Steinweiss – drums
- Paul Spring – guitar
- Kevin Martin – vocals
- Tony Martin – bass
- Eric Hagstrom – drums
- Paul Castelluzzo – guitar, keys
- Lady Wray – vocals
- Big Tony Martin – vocals

Technical

- Jens Jungkurth – mixer, engineer
- Leon Michels – engineer
- Alex Deturk – mastering

== Charts ==
Chart performance for Glorious Game
Chart (2023)	Peak position
German Albums (Offizielle Top 100)	44
US Top Album Sales (Billboard)	24
US Vinyl Albums (Billboard)	15
