= Urban Punk =

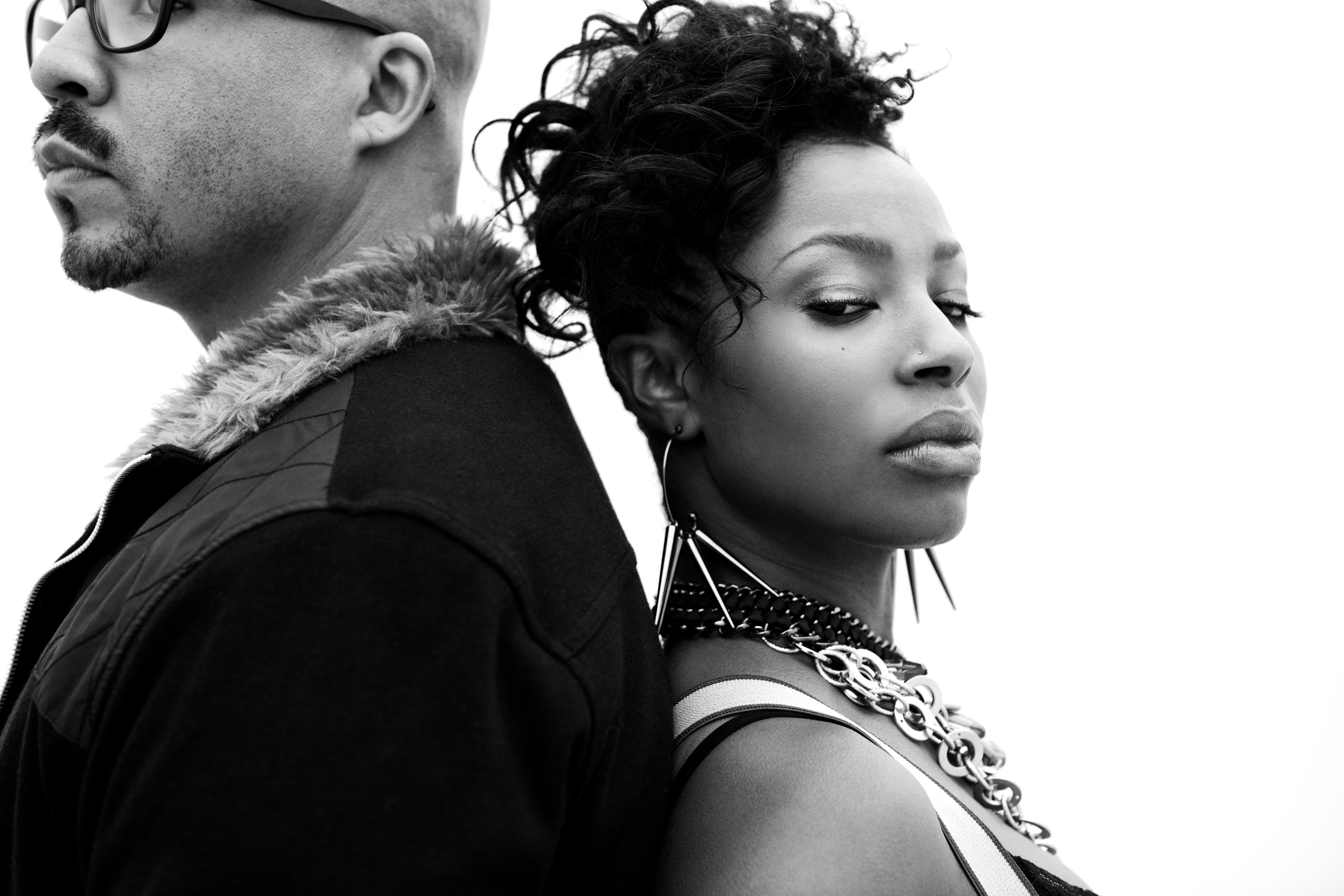

Background information
- Origin: Los Angeles, California, United States
- Genres: Hip hop, alternative hip hop, R&B, pop
- Years active: 2010–present
- Labels: Independent
- Members: Harrell Harris Jr. & La Toya Renee London
- Website: www.urbanpunkmusic.com

Harrell Harris Jr.
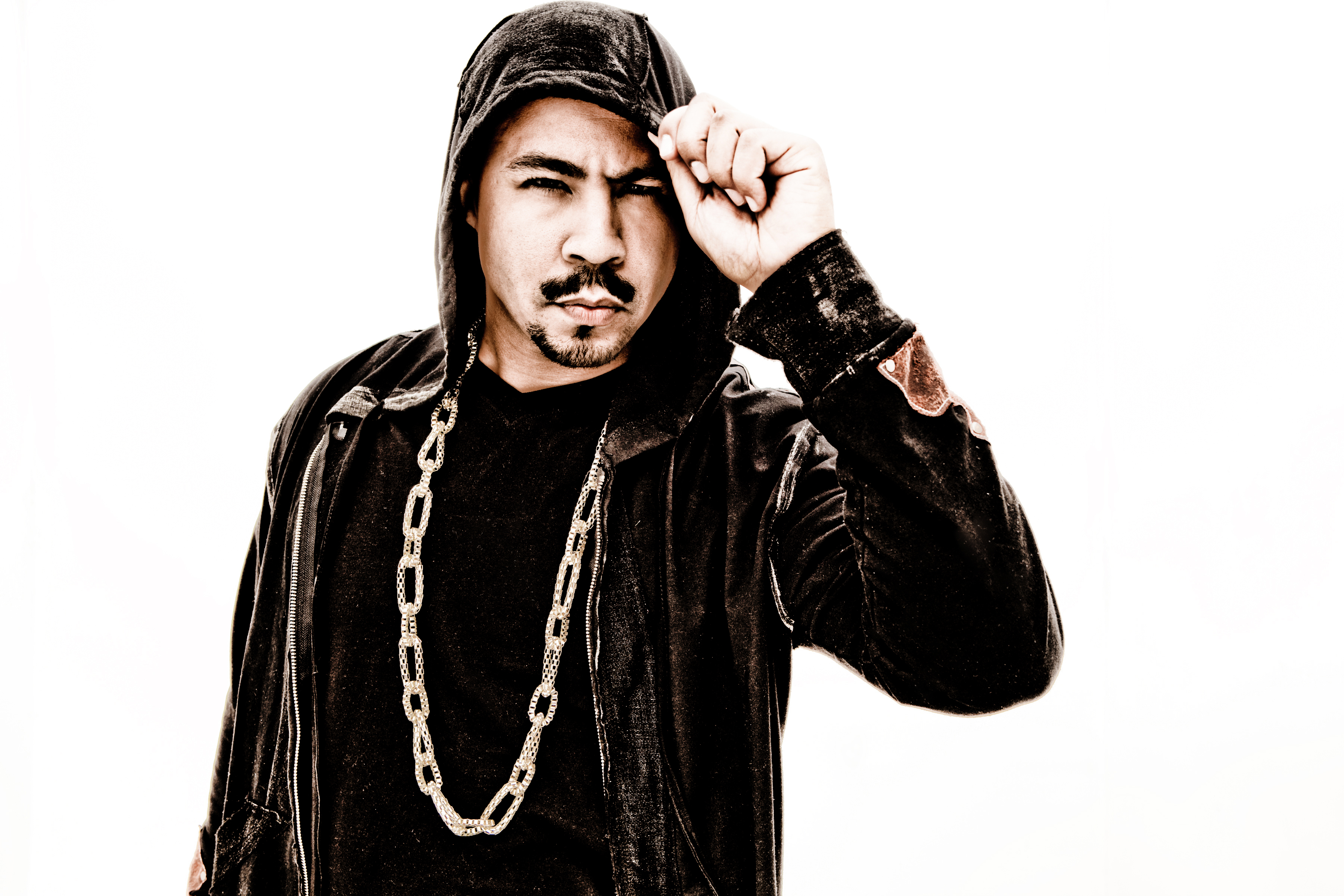

Background information
- Born: Harrell Harris Jr. San Francisco, California, United States
- Genres: Hip hop, alternative hip hop, R&B, pop
- Occupations: Rapper, musician, songwriter
- Instrument: Rapping
- Years active: 2007–present
- Labels: Independent
- Website: www.urbanpunkmusic.com

La Toya Renee London
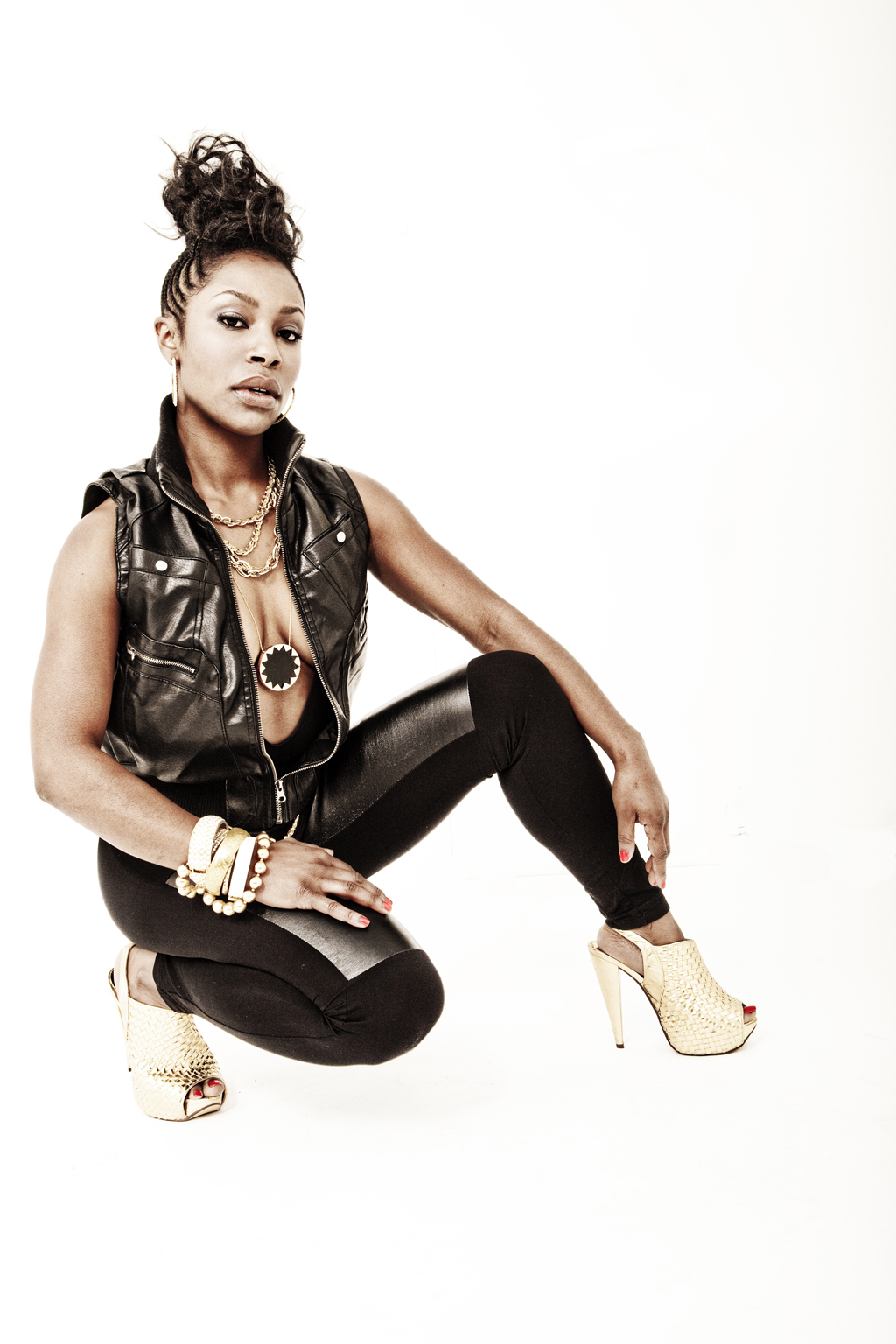

Background information
- Born: LaToya Renee London; December 28, 1978 (age 47); San Francisco, California, United States
- Genres: Hip hop, alternative hip hop, R&B, pop
- Occupations: Singer, musician, songwriter
- Instrument: Vocals
- Years active: 2004–present
- Labels: Independent
- Website: www.urbanpunkmusic.com

Urban Punk was formed October, 2010, in San Francisco, California, and is composed of hip-hop veteran, H2O (Harrell Harris), and 3rd season American Idol finalist LaToya London. They fuse their musical influences, combining Europop melodies with edgy hip-hop rhythms and R&B hooks. H2O has worked with everyone from Mix Master Mike and Bruno Mars to Fergie.

H began his career as a solo artist but soon joined forces with DJ Q Bert, MixMaster Mike, DJ Apollo and FMD to form FM20, a super group that blended alternative rock with hip hop. He then released two solo albums, Temporary Insanity (2007) and Therapy in 2008. In 2007, H recorded a track featuring Fergie of Black Eyed Peas, entitled "Just Leave". In 2009, H2O formed the group Prototype, produced by Keith Harris, producer and drummer for the Black Eye Peas. Prototype went on tour with the Black Eyed Peas. In 2010, after the Black Eyed Peas tour, H2O completed one of many successful tours with Sergio Mendes. In 2010, H2O collaborated with Bruno Mars on a track entitled "Turn Me On".

In 2004, La Toya London was a finalist in the 3rd season of American Idol, and was named one of the "Three Divas" along with Fantasia Barrino and Jennifer Hudson. On May 12, 2004, in a result that came as a surprise to many, including the judges, London became the ninth of the twelve finalists to be eliminated, finishing in fourth place, with Barrino also landing in the bottom two. Paula Abdul was in tears when LaToya sang her farewell song, "Don't Rain on My Parade" and the other two judges gave her a standing ovation.

In the summer of 2004, London performed with the other top 10 finalists in American Idol season three international tour, which crossed the United States and also visited China and Singapore. London has also performed the national anthem for numerous National Football League games, including the 2005 Super Bowl NFL Commissioner pre-game party. She has shared the stage with such icons and superstars as Elton John, Whoopi Goldberg, Barry Manilow, Gladys Knight, Nancy Wilson, Chaka Khan, Rachelle Ferrell, and Burt Bacharach.

In November 2004, it was announced that London had been signed to jazz recording label Peak Records, an imprint of Concord Records, the final label of jazz legend Ray Charles before his death. Her first single, "Appreciate" which featured a guest rap from Black Thought of the hip-hop group the Roots, hit the airwaves in July, and a music video of that song followed. The CD single, "Appreciate/Every Part of Me/All By Myself" reached #8 on the Billboard Singles Sales Chart.

Urban Punk was founded at an exciting point in the performers' lives. While H was re-forming his group, London was in development of a new vocal style and second album that would push her soulful sound beyond the boundaries of genre. Having known and worked with each other for years, H suggested London join forces.

H2O named the fusion Urban Punk. He challenges the group to push the envelope beyond the style and genre of modern music. Their witty and unpredictable lyrics, textured vocal melodies, and infectious beats and rhythms make Urban Punk a group that is simultaneously hard to classify and uniquely addictive.
