= Phillip Lehman =

French-American graffiti artist and cave diver

- Born: Philip Lehman; 1965 (age 60–61); London, England
- Other names: Bando; Phillippe Lehman
- Occupations: Graffiti artist; record producer; music executive; cave diver
- Years active: 1980–present
- Style: Graffiti (tagging)
- Movement: Street art
- Parents: Robin Lehman; Aki Lehman
- Family: Lehman family
- Musical career
- Genres: Funk; deep funk; afrobeat
- Occupations: Record executive; record producer; musician
- Years active: 1991–2004
- Labels: Pure Records; Desco; Soul Fire; Truth & Soul

Phillip Lehman (born Philip, alternatively spelled Philipp, born 1965) is a Franco-American artist, music producer, and cave diver best known as Bando, the graffiti pioneer of France who helped popularize the medium in Europe throughout the 1980s. Following this period, Lehman co-founded a string of funk labels in Paris and New York including Desco Records, the precursor to Daptone Records and his Truth & Soul Records. Since the 2000s, he has worked as a cave diver and speleologist in the Dominican Republic.

== Background ==
Born in 1965 to artistic parents Aki and Robin Lehman, Lehman was raised between New York City and Paris. He is the grandson of American investment banker Robert Lehman and the great-great-grandson of Emanuel Lehman, an investment banker and a co-founder of Lehman Brothers.

As a teenager, Lehman took part in New York graffiti culture under the name Bando, later bringing its ethos over to Europe. He is credited as bringing graffiti, particularly tagging, to France in the early 1980s and as a pioneer throughout Europe; an early and prolific participant in Europe's nascent graffiti culture, his style had particular influence into the 1990s. He was also instrumental in bringing prominent American artists like SEEN and JonOne to Europe. Among other crews, he founded Europe's first graffiti crew, Crime Time Kings, with Mode2 and Niels "Shoe" Meulman in 1985, representing the scenes of Paris, London, and Amsterdam, respectively; they reunited in 2013–2014. He is a noted personality in the history of European graffiti and has been a subject of exhibitions like the 2010 Pinacothèque de Paris exhibit Pressionism: Masterpieces of Graffiti on Canvas, from Basquiat to Bando. Since the 2010s, he has worked with and has been represented by Unruly Gallery in Amsterdam. He continues to produce tag art and paintings from the Dominican Republic.

== Career ==
An avid record collector, Lehman and a friend began compiling obscure funk 45s in the late 1980s and soon began issuing compilation LPs as Pure Records. Pure released classic and rare reissues and continued to put out compilations. They later shifted to Music Production under the Pure Productions banner. In 1995, Lehman moved back to New York City where he connected with musician Gabriel Roth, a former Pure Records customer. They soon began producing funk tracks together with other musicians. In 1997, he formed Desco Records with Roth. Located in Manhattan, Desco produced limited pressings of Lee Fields, The Sugarman 3, and the earliest Sharon Jones recordings.

In 1999–2000, Lehman and Roth decided to part ways, ending Desco after laying down the foundation to the New York afrobeat, funk and soul revival scenes. Roth would go on to co-found the seminal Daptone Records. Meanwhile, Lehman had started the gritty funk label Soul Fire Records. He put out records by Lee Fields, The Whitefield Brothers, and the like, with many backed by his house band The Mighty Imperials, a precursor to groups like El Michels Affair and Menahan Street Band.

Wanting to pursue interests outside of music, he phased out Soul Fire so to help found Truth & Soul Records with DJ Jeff Dynamite and Leon Michels, a member of The Mighty Imperials. Following the transition to the new label in 2004, he moved to the Dominican Republic.

=== The Mighty Imperials ===
The Mighty Imperials were an ensemble that were influenced by the Meters. According to RX Music, they had their own brand of Funk. The ensemble consisted of Leon Michels, Homer Steinweiss, Nick Movshon, and Sean Solomon They only had one album credited to them which was Thunder Chicken which was recorded at the Desco studio. The track "Soul Buster" from the album featured Joseph Henry, a former gospel singer with a shouting style who had at one stage been with The Coasters. According to sound engineer Bosco Mann, Henry who had cut the 45 "Who’s the King?" with the studio the previous year was able to energize the band members. He walked into the studio while the band members were messing around and he went directly to the microphone and commanded them to "Keep it just where it is". He had already begun singing when Bosco made it to the control room to start recording. Some horns were later added and that's how the song "Soul Buster" came about.

The studio closed down and the record never saw the light of day until 2001 when it was illegally released in the UK. In 2004, Daptone Records managed to secure the record for official release.

=== Further activities ===
Since the 2010s, Lehman has had a career in cave diving and exploration. He is a founding member of the Dominican Republic Speleology Society and the Madagascar Cave Diving Association, and has contributed to scientific research on aquatic life as well as underwater photography. He continues to work as an artist.
