= Carl Jenkins =

Carl or Karl Jenkins is the name of:

== Real people ==
- Karl Jenkins (born 1944), Welsh musician and composer
- Karl Jenkins, American rapper, known professionally as Dice Raw

== Characters ==
- Carl Jenkins, General/Doctor, Minister of Paranormal Warfare in Starship Troopers film
- Carl Jenkins, TV series character, see list of Oz (TV series) characters
