= Streams of Thought, Vol. 3: Cane & Able =

Studio album by Black Thought
- Released: October 16, 2020
- Genre: Hip hop
- Length: 34:19
- Label: Passyunk; Republic
- Producer: Sean C (also exec.); LV; Marvino Beats; Sal Dali

Black Thought chronology
Streams of Thought, Vol. 2 (2018)	Streams of Thought, Vol. 3: Cane & Able (2020)	Cheat Codes (2022)

Streams of Thought, Vol. 3: Cane & Able is the debut studio album by American emcee Black Thought. It was released on October 16, 2020, by Passyunk Productions and Republic Records. Primarily produced by Sean C, the album is the sequel to his second EP, Streams of Thought, Vol. 2, released in 2018. It features guest appearances by Pusha T, Swizz Beatz, Killer Mike, Portugal. The Man, The Last Artful, Dodgr and Schoolboy Q, among others.

== Background ==
Black Thought explained the origin of the album's subtitle: "The producer, Sean C, his last name is Cane ... He's quite literally Sean Cane. And me being one of the most able MCs, it's a play on words as a nod to my ability and to him actually being Cane. And then also too, just a sign of the times, so to speak, and the original sin, I guess. It spoke to all those different things, so it made perfect sense to subtitle the album."

== Critical reception ==
Professional ratings
Aggregate scores
Source	Rating
Metacritic	74/100
Review scores
Source	Rating
AllMusic	4/5 stars
And It Don't Stop	A−
The Guardian	4/5 stars
The Philadelphia Inquirer	3/4 stars
Pitchfork	6.9/10
Tom Hull – on the Web	A−

Streams of Thought, Vol. 3: Cane & Able was met with generally favorable reviews from critics. At Metacritic, which assigns a normalized rating out of 100 to reviews from mainstream publications, the album received an average score of 74, based on five reviews. Kitty Empire of The Guardian commended Black Thought's lyricism, writing that "this veteran polemicist is on fire, his learned invective weaponised to meet the present moment." Veteran critic Tom Hull described the album as "conscious and hard", noting that Sean C's production is "not as supple as [the Roots'], but more to the point." Stephen Kearse of Pitchfork praised Black Thought for his "ability to use words as textures as much as tools", and concluded, "it's that ingrained instinct that saves Vol 3. from falling prey to the same monotony and excess as an Eminem or Royce album."

== Track listing ==
No.	Title	Writer(s)	Producer(s)	Length
1.	"I'm Not Crazy (First Contact)"	Tarik Trotter; Deleno Matthews; Andy Attanasio; John Trudell	Sean C	1:47
2.	"State Prisoner"	Trotter; Matthews	Sean C	2:58
3.	"Good Morning" (featuring Pusha T, Swizz Beatz & Killer Mike)	Trotter; Matthews; Kasseem Dean; Levar Coppin; Michael Render; Saliou Diagne; Terrence Thornton	Sean C; LV; Sal Dali	3:20
4.	"Magnificent"	Trotter; Matthews	Sean C	2:41
5.	"Experience"	Trotter; Matthews; Coppin; Diagne	Sean C	0:28
6.	"Quiet Trip" (featuring Portugal. The Man & The Last Artful, Dodgr)	Trotter; Matthews; John Gourley; Diagne	Sean C; Sal Dali	3:36
7.	"Nature of the Beast" (featuring Portugal. The Man & The Last Artful, Dodgr)	Trotter; Matthews; Alana Chenevert; Marvin Donnel McCray	Sean C; Marvino Beats	3:01
8.	"We Could Be Good (United)" (featuring C.S. Armstrong & OSHUN)	Trotter; Matthews; Chauncy Sherod; McCray; Robert Ward	Sean C; Marvino Beats	3:27
9.	"Steak Um" (featuring Schoolboy Q)	Matthews; Blair Wells; Quincy Hanley; Diagne	Sean C	3:28
10.	"Thought vs Everybody"	Trotter; Matthews; Curtis Brown; Ishmael Muhommad	Sean C	3:07
11.	"Ghetto Boys and Girls (Fuel Interlude)"	Trotter; Matthews; Sherod	Sean C	1:29
12.	"Fuel" (featuring Portugal. The Man & The Last Artful, Dodgr)	Trotter; Matthews; Chenevert; Gourley; Coppin	Sean C	4:14
13.	"I'm Not Crazy (Outro)"	Trotter; Matthews; Attanasio; Trudell	Sean C	1:16
Total length:				34:19

== Charts ==
Chart (2020)	Peak position
US Current Album Sales (Billboard)	35
