= Nikki Jean =

American singer-songwriter (born 1983)

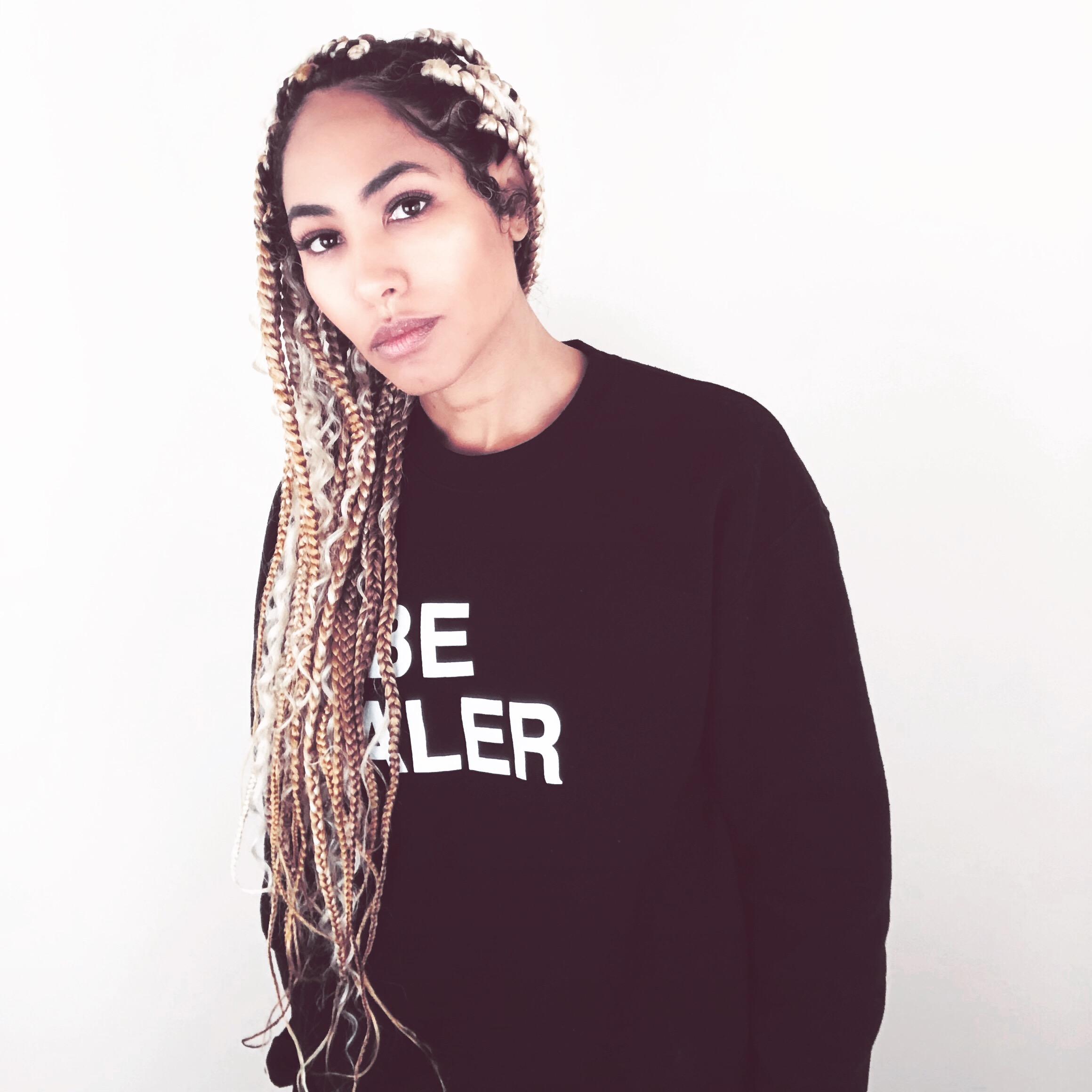
- Jean in 2019

Background information
- Born: Nicolle Jean Leary; August 25, 1983 (age 43); Saint Paul, Minnesota, U.S.
- Genres: Soul; hip-hop; pop
- Occupations: Singer; songwriter
- Years active: 2005–present
- Labels: Rhymesayers; Columbia; S-Curve
- Formerly of: Nouveau Riche

Nicolle Jean Leary (born August 25, 1983), better known as Nikki Jean, is an American singer-songwriter. Born in Saint Paul, Minnesota, Jean started out as a lead singer of a short-lived Philadelphia band called Nouveau Riche. She was introduced to rapper Lupe Fiasco when he was working on his 2007 album Lupe Fiasco's The Cool and achieved initial success as the featuring artist on his single "Hip Hop Saved My Life". She continues to collaborate frequently with him.

After two years of co-writing songs with many different songwriters for her debut album, including Bob Dylan and Carole King, Jean released Pennies in a Jar in 2011. The album received positive reviews but commercially underperformed. Her solo career continued with three extended plays: the X-Mas EP (2013), the Champagne Water EP (2014), and Beautiful Prison (2019).

== Early life ==
Nicolle Jean Leary was born in Saint Paul, Minnesota on August 25, 1983. (Note: The Wall Street Journal spells her first name Nicolle. The Philadelphia Inquirer stated that she was born Nicholle Jean Harvey, while an article from KYW-TV, a CBS television station in Philadelphia, says that she was born "Nicole Jean Leary in St. Paul, Minnesota. Jean tweeted thanking her fans "for the birthday wishes" on August 25, 2011. She was interviewed by Jim Fusilli of The Wall Street Journal in June 2011, who said she was then twenty-seven years old. This places her birthdate on August 25, 1983.) Her father was a government aid agency worker and her mother was a labor lawyer. Jean developed an early interest in songwriting after watching Irving Berlin's 100th birthday in 1983, and started learning the piano aged eight. Her mother's interest in folk music led her to learn the importance of writing lyrics that are easy to sing along to. Jean was also influenced by her mother's taste in Paul Simon and Stevie Wonder, and grew up watching old musicals. She took the name "Nikki Jean" while in high school to distinguish herself from other people who shared her name.

While attending Howard University, Jean met singer Nona Hendryx. Hendryx recommended she listen to Joni Mitchell and Laura Nyro, which opened her up to chord structure. She also studied acting.

== Career ==
=== 2005–2008: Nouveau Riche and Lupe Fiasco's The Cool ===
After graduating in 2005, Jean was invited to perform at a Labor Day barbecue in Philadelphia by The Roots. Their member Dice Raw asked Jean to join his new band called the Disease (renamed Nouveau Riche two weeks later) after hearing her play piano in a studio. Jean accepted the offer and moved to the city, where she lived in the neighborhood of Manayunk. The five-member Nouveau Riche released two extended plays (EPs) when it was active from 2005–2008. As the lead singer, Jean co-wrote many of the band's songs. She uploaded videos on her YouTube channel "nikkijeanproject".

Jean was working with producers Chris & Drop, who played one of Jean's songs to rapper Lupe Fiasco. Fiasco invited her to collaborate with him. She featured on two tracks on his album Lupe Fiasco's The Cool (2007): "Little Weapon" and the single "Hip Hop Saved My Life", which she co-wrote. She later went on the tour for the album. Jean's collaborations with Fiasco helped her gain wider recognition: a Billboard journalist wrote in 2011 that she was "previously best-known for her singing/writing stints on [The Cool]." Jean and Fiasco performed as one of the opening acts in Kanye West's 2008 Glow in the Dark Tour.

=== 2008–2011: Pennies in a Jar ===
In 2008, Jean sought out producer Sam Hollander for his work on Carole King's 2001 album Love Makes the World to discuss a direction for a future solo career. For her debut album, Hollander suggested that she travel around the United States to co-write songs with "the greatest songwriters" for her debut album.

For two years, Jean wrote songs with writers such as King, Burt Bacharach and Bob Dylan, many of which were popular during the 1970s and 1980s. She believed her lack of mainstream success helped her secure collaborations, which allowed her to approach each writer as a fan. Dylan permitted her to complete "Steel and Feathers (Don't Ever)", a song of his that had been unfinished for over thirty years. She was originally signed to Columbia Records but was let go in late 2010 as her music seemed "more mature" than they anticipated; the album was instead released on July 12, 2011 by indie label S-Curve Records, titled Pennies in a Jar. She appeared on the Late Show with David Letterman, Tavis Smiley, Weekend Edition Saturday and Live from Daryl's House to promote it.

While the album received positive reviews from music journalists, its songs failed to chart — except in Japan, where it reached the Top 10 singles. Hollander would later write in his autobiography, "In my mind, I'd totally failed Nikki. [...] I'd under-thought the greatest idea ever and hung her out to dry in the process. She deserved better. This was easily the biggest miss of my career, and man, it stung."

=== 2011–present: Extended plays and further collaborations ===
Jean later moved to Los Angeles. She released the X-Mas EP in 2013, and was a featuring artist on Ab-Soul's 2014 song "World Runners". On October 22, 2014, Jean released the first single from her second solo EP, "Champagne Water", featuring Ab-Soul. Vibe premiered the extended play of the same name on November 19, 2014, containing six songs which concern topics such as police shootings, heartbreak and religion. Jake One, Like, Double-O, Donnie Trumpet and Nate Fox serve as producers.

She featured on several songs on Lupe Fiasco's 2015 album Tetsuo & Youth. Jean, Fiasco and The Roots performed "Little Death" on The Tonight Show Starring Jimmy Fallon in February 2015. She and Fiasco also appeared for the first season of Why? with Hannibal Buress (2015). Jean later featured on songs from Fiasco's 2018 album Drogas Wave. In 2019, Jean released the seven-track EP Beautiful Prison through Rhymesayers Entertainment, with Fiasco featuring on the Jake One-produced single "Mr. Clean". She also released a short film called Get Free.

== Musical style and influences ==
A soul and pop artist and songwriter who often features on hip-hop songs, Alison Stewart of The Washington Post described Jean as a "parallel universe's offspring of Carole King and Janelle Monae". Pennies in a Jar featured pop and soul music reminiscent of the 1960s–80s era in which many of her co-writers flourished. AllMusic's Andy Kellman said that the songs contained, perhaps, "a modernized hip-hop spin". He added that Jean had "a lithe, quietly potent voice", which other critics characterized as sincere. Her 2014 EP Champagne Water touched on contemporary societal issues, including police shootings and religion. Jean said that since childhood she listened to songwriters rather than singers: "Songwriters were my rock stars."

== Discography ==
=== Albums ===
- Pennies in a Jar (2011)

=== EPs ===
- X-Mas EP (2013)
- Champagne Water EP (2014)
- Beautiful Prison (2019)
