= Black Thought =

American rapper (born 1973)

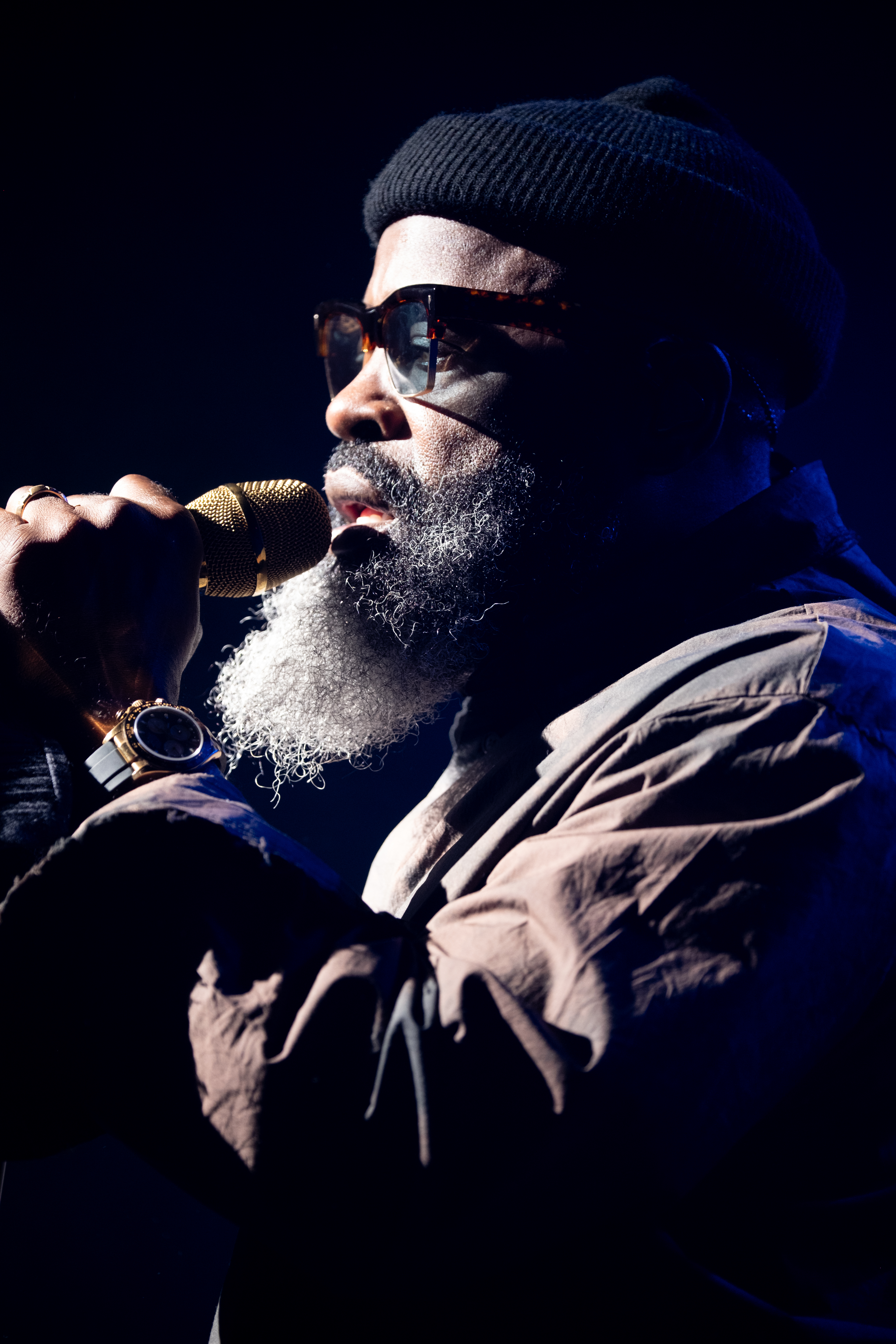
- Black Thought performing in 2026

Background information
- Also known as: Tarik Collins; Reek Ruffin; Riq Geez; The Bad Lieutenant; Hawk Smooth
- Born: Tariq Luqmaan Trotter; October 3, 1973 (age 53); Philadelphia, Pennsylvania, U.S.
- Genre: East Coast hip hop
- Occupations: Rapper; singer; songwriter; actor; author; television host
- Years active: 1987–present
- Labels: Okayplayer; Def Jam; Republic; Geffen
- Member of: The Roots; The Tonight Show Band

Tariq Luqmaan Trotter (born October 3, 1973), better known by his stage name Black Thought, is an American rapper, singer, actor, television host, and the lead MC of the hip hop group The Roots, which he co-founded with drummer Questlove in Philadelphia. Regarded as "one of the most skilled, incisive, and prolific rappers of his time", he is widely lauded for his live performance skills, continuous multisyllabic rhyme schemes, complex lyricism, double entendres, and politically aware lyrics. He and The Roots perform as the house band for The Tonight Show Starring Jimmy Fallon, frequently playing games with Fallon and his guests.

== Early life ==
Black Thought was born Tarik Luqmaan Trotter, to Thomas and Cassandra Trotter, both members of the Nation of Islam. His father was murdered when Trotter was one year old, and his mother was murdered when he was in high school. He spent time tagging "DT" or "Double T" with graffiti around Philadelphia. He sold crack cocaine briefly, and was sent to live with family in Detroit for a few months in high school. Trotter attended the Philadelphia High School for Creative and Performing Arts and Millersville University, studying journalism. In 1987, he became friends with drummer Ahmir "Questlove" Thompson and formed a drummer/MC duo, performing on the streets of Philadelphia and at talent shows. Trotter subsequently spent some time as one of two MCs in the group the Square Roots; the other was Malik B., whom Tariq met in college. In high school, Black Thought became interested in the lessons of the Nation of Gods and Earths.

== The Roots ==
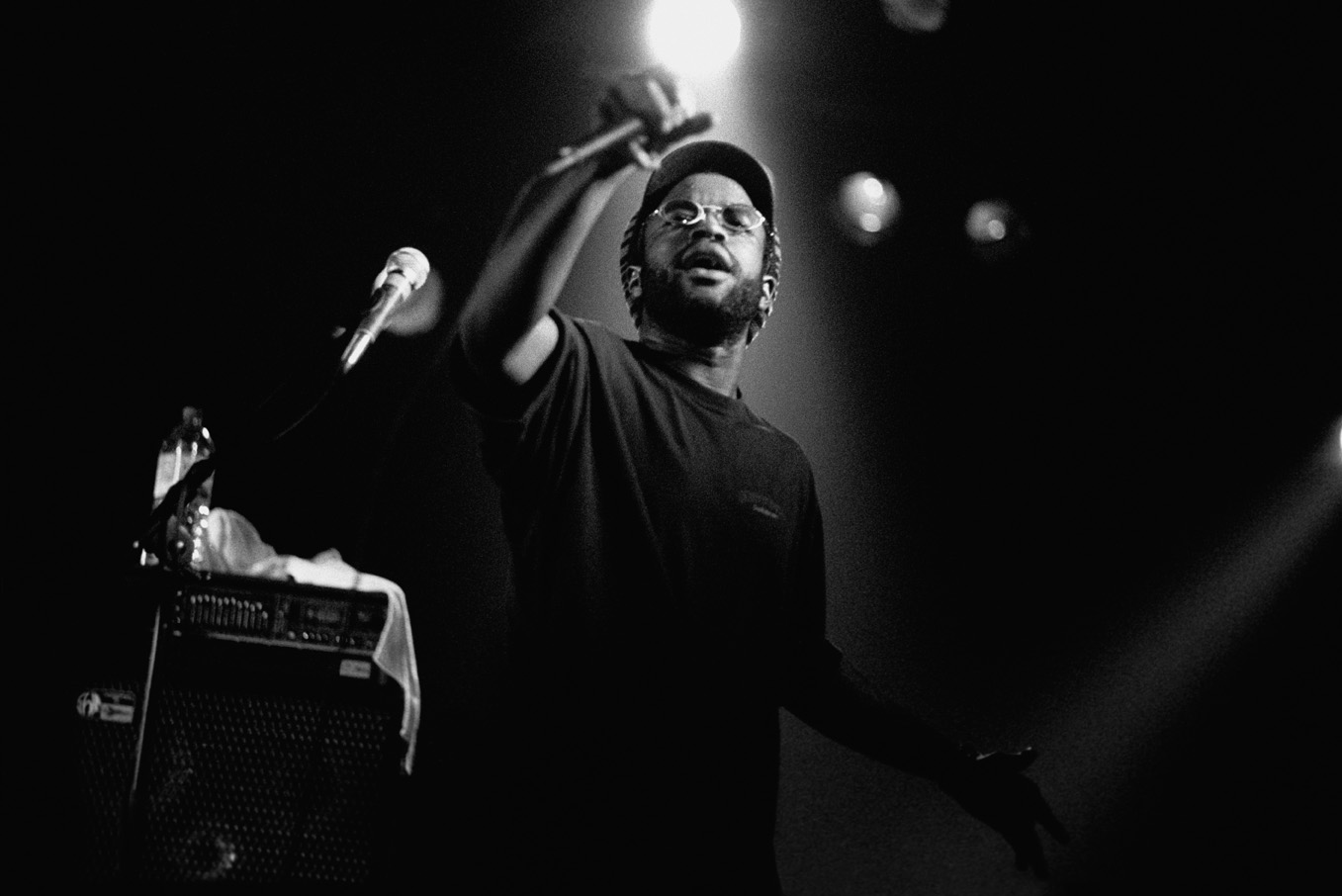
Black Thought with the Roots in Hamburg, Germany, in 1999

The Square Roots renamed themselves the Roots and released their debut album Organix in 1993. The Roots signed to DGC and followed up with Do You Want More?!!!??! in 1995. Recorded without any sampling, the album was more popular among alternative music fans than those of hip hop. Around the release of the album, the Roots performed at the Lollapalooza alternative music festival and Montreux Jazz Festival. Illadelph Halflife, the band's 1996 album, became its first to chart within the top 40 spots on the Billboard 200 because of the successful single "What They Do". Things Fall Apart followed in 1999, the year the band played at the Woodstock 99 concert.

In 2000, the Roots won the Grammy Award for Best Rap Performance by a Duo or Group for "You Got Me", with guest performances by Erykah Badu and Eve. Things Fall Apart was nominated for Best Rap Album. For Jay-Z's acoustic concert for the television program MTV Unplugged, the Roots provided instrumentals. Succeeding albums were Phrenology (2002), The Tipping Point (2004), Game Theory (2006), Rising Down (2008), How I Got Over (2010), Undun (2011), and …And Then You Shoot Your Cousin (2014).

== Solo music career ==
Black Thought recorded a solo album, titled Masterpiece Theatre and intended for a 2001 release, but the project was scrapped after he learned that the album would not count toward the Roots' contractual commitments. Most of the songs from the project ultimately appeared on Phrenology. In a June 2008 interview with Brian Kayser of the website HipHopGame, Black Thought spoke of another solo project that was scheduled for release on the Razor and Tie music corporation. He said that Questlove might work on production. However, by September 2014, Black Thought and the solo album were not referenced on the Razor & Tie website.

Black Thought's first release outside of The Roots was the 2011 mixtape The Prestige, which he released alongside 10.Deep and the Money Making Jam Collective, the latter of which included longtime Roots collaborators such as Dice Raw, S.T.S., P.O.R.N., and Truck North. In 2013, he stated his intention to follow the mixtape with an album titled Talented Mr. Trotter. However, Black Thought's next release would instead be the EP Streams of Thought, Vol. 1, a June 2018 collaboration with producer 9th Wonder. That November, Black Thought and Salaam Remi released a follow-up EP, Streams of Thought, Vol. 2. The third installment in the "Streams of Thought" series, Streams of Thought, Vol. 3: Cane & Able, was a full studio album released in 2020. The album was preceded by the single "Good Morning", which featured Pusha T, Killer Mike, and Swizz Beatz; other featured artists on the album include Portugal. The Man, Schoolboy Q and the Last Artful, Dodgr.

Black Thought and Danger Mouse had begun work on a collaborative album, originally titled Dangerous Thoughts, in 2006. There was no further news about this album for years, until the artists announced in May 2022 that they would be releasing their collaboration that August. The album, retitled Cheat Codes, was released on August 10, 2022. Cheat Codes included a posthumous appearance from MF Doom; other featured artists included Raekwon, Kid Sister, Joey Badass, Russ, Dylan Cartlidge, Michael Kiwanuka, ASAP Rocky, Run the Jewels, and Conway the Machine.

In February 2016, Black Thought joined forces with Fashawn, Murs, and Del the Funky Homosapien to record a new track called "Rise Up" for the video game Street Fighter V. Capcom released a music video for the song that included appearances by Black Thought and his fellow collaborators.

In December 2017, Black Thought appeared on HOT 97 with Funkmaster Flex and performed a 10-minute freestyle over "The Learning (Burn)" instrumental by Mobb Deep. This freestyle went widely viral, trending on Twitter for the next days and hitting millions of views on YouTube.

== Other work ==
Black Thought starred in films such as Bamboozled (2000), and the 2001 films Perfume, Love Rome, and Brooklyn Babylon. He made his stage debut in January 2022, playing Dr. Junius Crookman in the musical Black No More; he also wrote the lyrics and co-wrote the music for the production.

In 2013, Black Thought began work on a memoir with journalist and music critic Jeff Chang and filmmaker Maori Karmael Holmes. An autobiography entitled The Upcycled Self was released on November 14, 2023.

Black Thought was also an executive producer for the short film Ash Land, which is featured in the 2023 Oregon Shakespeare Festival's Cyberland Short Films collection, and it's about a woman who loses and then finds herself again while living in the mountains of Ashland, a small town in Oregon during the COVID pandemic, where the festival takes place. Ash Land was an official selection in 2021 for the Academy Award–qualifying Pan African Film Festival, the Brooklyn Film Festival, Bronzelens Film Festival, and Martha Vineyard's African American Film Festival. The film is directed by South African native Shariffa Ali and written by Banna Desta. The film ends with a closing fade to black and voice over of Black Thought addressing the “Black Experience” in Oregon with a powerful and final affirmation: “We Black. We in Oregon. Look at us.”

== Legacy ==
Black Thought is "widely recognized as one of the most skilled, incisive, and prolific rappers of his time", according to AllMusic critic Andy Kellman. He is highly regarded for his multisyllabic rhymes, internal rhymes, flow, breath control, socially conscious lyrics, and live performances. Questlove stated that Black Thought's clarity and logic also distinguishes him from other emcees, and Stephen Kearse of Pitchfork notes that his "ability to use words as textures as much as tools has always been a hallmark of his style". In the book How to Rap, emcee Kool G Rap described seeing the Roots perform his song "Men at Work" at a show; "I never really liked to perform it that much—because your breath control gotta be crazy. But somebody sent me a clip of the Roots ... and [Black Thought] did all three fucking verses and I couldn't believe it—he killed that shit". Black Thought has influenced several hip hop artists, including Logic, Joey Badass, Rapsody, k-os, and Shad.

== Personal life ==
Black Thought and his wife Michelle were married in 2010. He has four sons and a daughter.

== Discography ==
=== Studio albums ===
| Title | Album details | Peak chart positions | | | | | | |
| Title | Album details | US | US R&B/HH | US Rap | GER | NZ | SCO | UK |
|---|---|---|---|---|---|---|---|---|
| Streams of Thought, Vol. 3: Cane & Able | Released: October 16, 2020; Label: Passyunk, Republic; Format: LP, digital download, streaming | — | — | — | — | — | — | — |
| Cheat Codes (with Danger Mouse) | Released: August 12, 2022; Label: BMG; Format: LP, digital download, streaming | 43 | 26 | 17 | 8 | 33 | 8 | 28 |
| Glorious Game (with El Michels Affair) | Released: April 14, 2023; Label: Big Crown; Format: LP, digital download, streaming | — | — | — | 44 | — | — | — |

=== Extended plays ===
| Title | EP details | Peak chart positions | | |
| Title | EP details | US | US R&B/HH | US Ind. |
|---|---|---|---|---|
| Streams of Thought, Vol. 1 | Released: June 1, 2018; Label: Human Re Sources; Format: Digital download, streaming | 62 | 33 | 7 |
| Streams of Thought, Vol. 2 (with Salaam Remi) | Released: November 26, 2018; Label: Human Re Sources, Passyunk; Format: Digital download, streaming | — | — | 18 |
| African Dreams (with Seun Kuti) | Released: December 9, 2022; Label: Ske80; Format: Digital download, streaming | — | — | — |

=== With The Roots ===
- Organix (1993)
- Do You Want More?!!!??! (1995)
- Illadelph Halflife (1996)
- Things Fall Apart (1999)
- Phrenology (2002)
- The Tipping Point (2004)
- Game Theory (2006)
- Rising Down (2008)
- How I Got Over (2010)
- Undun (2011)
- ...And Then You Shoot Your Cousin (2014)

=== Guest appearances ===
| Title | Year | Other artist(s) | Album |
|---|---|---|---|
| "Slow Burn" | 1994 | Steve Coleman and Metrics, Najma Akhtar | A Tale of 3 Cities |
| "Pffat Time" | 1994 | Steve Williamson | Journey To Truth |
| "Blakk Planets" | 1994 | Steve Williamson | Journey To Truth |
| "Meiso" | 1995 | DJ Krush, Malik B. | Meiso |
| "My Generation" | 1996 | Teodross Avery | My Generation |
| "The Agenda" | 1997 | Inoran | Sou (CDS) |
| "Listen to This" | 1997 | Walkin' Large | Listen to This |
| "Stolen Moments, Pt. 2" | 1997 | Common | One Day It'll All Make Sense |
| "Get This Low" | 1997 | Jedi Mind Tricks, Jus Allah | The Psycho-Social |
| "Super Lyrical" | 1998 | Big Pun | Capital Punishment |
| "Live from the Stretch Armstrong Show with Your Host Bobbito "The Barber"" | 1998 | Common, Pharoahe Monch, Absolute | Lyricist Lounge, Volume One |
| "It's About That Time" | 1998 | Pete Rock, Rob-O | Soul Survivor |
| "Relax" | 1998 | Jamaaladeen Tacuma | Groove 2000 |
| "The Hollers of the Horn" | 1998 | Jamaaladeen Tacuma | Groove 2000 |
| "Respiration (Flying High Mix)" | 1999 | Black Star | Respiration (VLS) |
| "1.9.8.6. Remix" | 1999 | Sway & King Tech, Malik B., Rasheed, Ill Advised | This or That |
| "Get Up (Livin' Proof Remix)" | 1999 | Amel Larrieux | Get Up (VLS) |
| "I Own This Microphone" | 1999 | Fong-Sai-U | Own (VLS) |
| "Mumia 911" | 1999 | Unbound Allstars | Mumia 911 (VLS) |
| "Countdown" | 2000 | Spacek, Slum Village, Bahamadia | Countdown (VLS) |
| "Thin Line (Between Raw and Jiggy)" | 2000 | Dice Raw, Malik B. | Reclaiming the Dead |
| "Lockdown" | 2000 | Dice Raw, Steve | Reclaiming the Dead |
| "Ghost Weed 3 (skit)" | 2000 | De La Soul | Art Official Intelligence: Mosaic Thump |
| "Kickin' Wicked Rhymes" | 2000 | DJ Hurricane, Ad-Rock | Don't Sleep |
| "Network" | 2000 | The Pharcyde | Plain Rap |
| "Nothing Ventured" | 2001 | Ed O.G. | The Truth Hurts |
| "In the Sun" {unreleased} | 2001 | Shaquille O'Neal, Common, Joi | Shaquille O'Neal Presents His Superfriends, Vol. 1 (unreleased) |
| "Hard Hitters" | 2001 | Dilated Peoples | Expansion Team |
| "Zen Approach" | 2001 | DJ Krush | Zen |
| "Ain't Nobody Playin'" | 2002 | Jaguar Wright | Denials Delusions and Decisions |
| "I Don't Know" | 2002 | Jaguar Wright | Denials Delusions and Decisions |
| "Clap!" | 2002 | Soulive | Next |
| "X-Ecutioner Style" | 2002 | Linkin Park, Sean C, Roc Raida | Reanimation |
| "U Know the Rulez" | 2002 | Scratch, M.A.R.S, Malik B., Co-Op | The Embodiment of Instrumentation |
| "Guerrilla Monsoon Rap" | 2002 | Talib Kweli, Pharoahe Monch | Quality |
| "The Bullshit" | 2003 | Jane Doe, Talib Kweli | The Introduction |
| "You Got 2" | 2003 | Triple Threat, Main Flow | Many Styles |
| "Ain't No Stopping Us Now" | 2003 | Larry Gold, McFadden, Whitehead | —N/a |
| "Don't Bring Your Bitch" | 2003 | Planet Asia | Collabo's and Bullets |
| "Live from the PJs" | 2004 | The X-Ecutioners, Ghostface Killah, Trife | Revolutions |
| "Away from Here" | 2004 | Philly's Most Wanted | Ring the Alarm |
| "Subzero" | 2004 | Sly and Robbie | Version Born |
| "Appreciate" | 2005 | LaToya London | Love & Life |
| "Mad Nice" {unreleased} | 2005 | Danger Doom | The Mouse and the Mask |
| "Right Now" | 2005 | Fort Minor, Styles of Beyond | The Rising Tied |
| "Pimpa's Paradise" | 2005 | Damian Marley | Welcome to Jamrock |
| "Flutlicht" | 2005 | Curse | Sinnflut |
| "Come Together" | 2006 | J. Period, Zion | Science of Breath, Volume 3 |
| "Yes, Yes Y'all" | 2006 | Sérgio Mendes, Chali 2na, Debi Nova, will.i.am | Timeless |
| "My Favorite Mutiny" | 2006 | The Coup, Talib Kweli | Pick a Bigger Weapon |
| "Over Your Head" | 2006 | Planet Asia | The Mutiny |
| "Love Movin'" | 2006 | J Dilla | The Shining |
| "Clean Up" | 2007 | Strong Arm Steady, Saukrates | Deep Hearted |
| "Cause I'm Black" | 2007 | Styles P | Super Gangster (Extraordinary Gentleman) |
| "Give It Up" | 2008 | Muja Messiah | Thee Adventures of a B-Boy D-Boy |
| "Hold Tight" | 2008 | Skillz | The Million Dollar Backpack |
| "Hot Shyt" | 2009 | Wale | Back to the Feature |
| "Live Forever" | 2009 | Cradle Orchestra | Velvet Ballads |
| "Philly Boy" | 2009 | BK-One | Rádio do Canibal |
| "Reality TV" | 2009 | J Dilla | Jay Stay Paid |
| "Slow Down" | 2009 | Chiddy Bang, eLDee the Don | The Swelly Express |
| "Philadelphia Born and Raised" | 2010 | Meek Mill, Freeway, Young Chris | Flamers 3: The Wait Is Over |
| "Philly Shit (Remix)" | 2010 | Young Chris, Meek Mill, Eve | —N/a |
| "Ill Street Blues" | 2010 | STS | More Demand 2 |
| "In tha Park" | 2010 | Ghostface Killah | Apollo Kids |
| "Let Freedom Reign" | 2010 | Chrisette Michele, Talib Kweli | Let Freedom Reign |
| "The Masters of Our Fate" | 2011 | Raekwon | Shaolin vs. Wu-Tang |
| "Too Long" | 2011 | Saigon | The Greatest Story Never Told |
| "Million Star Motel" | 2011 | Nikki Jean, Lupe Fiasco | Pennies in a Jar |
| "Riot" | 2011 | Thurz | L.A. Riot |
| "God Knows Why" | 2011 | Nneka | Soul Is Heavy |
| "Mathematics" | 2011 | OCD: Moosh & Twist | The Welcome Mat |
| "Living in Bunkers" | 2012 | Hilltop Hoods, Lotek | Drinking from the Sun |
| "TNT (Remix)" | 2012 | ¡Mayday!, DJ Khaled, Stevie Stone, Jon Connor, Jay Rock | —N/a |
| "Congregation" | 2012 | Talib Kweli, Ab-Soul | Attack the Block |
| "Rap Politicians" | 2013 | La the Darkman | Paid in Full |
| "Bird's Eye View" | 2013 | Statik Selektah, Raekwon, Joey Badass | Extended Play |
| "Try Again" | 2013 | k-os | Black on Blonde |
| "Codes & Cab Fare" | 2013 | Black Milk | No Poison No Paradise |
| "Thought Process" | 2013 | Tony Touch | The Piece Maker 3: Return of the 50 MC's |
| "Art Imitates Life" | 2013 | Talib Kweli, Rah Digga, ALBe. Back | Gravitas |
| "Rapid Eye Movement" | 2014 | Pharoahe Monch | PTSD |
| "The Imperial" | 2014 | Statik Selektah, Action Bronson, Royce da 5'9" | What Goes Around |
| "Thorn or a Rose" | 2014 | Stephen Marley | Revelation Pt. 2 – The Fruit of Life |
| "Money Makes Us Happy" | 2015 | Skyzoo | Music for My Friends |
| "Immortals (Remix)" | 2015 | Fall Out Boy | Make America Psycho Again |
| "Send Me a Sign" | 2015 | Black Violin, Melanie Fiona | Stereotypes |
| "Extradite" | 2015 | Freddie Gibbs | Shadow of a Doubt |
| "Wishin' II" | 2015 | PRhyme | PRhyme (Deluxe Version) |
| "Rap on Steroids" | 2016 | Royce da 5'9" | Trust the Shooter |
| "Wrote My Way Out (Remix)" | 2016 | Royce da 5'9", Aloe Blacc, Joyner Lucas | The Hamilton Mixtape |
| "Nobody But Me" | 2016 | Michael Bublé | Nobody but Me |
| "Who Shot Ya (Andre Betts Remix)" | 2016 | Living Colour, Chuck D, Pharoahe Monch, Prodigal Sunn | —N/a |
| "Rise Up" | 2016 | Del the Funky Homosapien, Murs, Fashawn, Questlove, Domino | Street Fighter V (soundtrack) |
| "America" | 2017 | Logic, Chuck D, Big Lenbo, No I.D. | Everybody |
| "Who Want It" | 2017 | David Banner, Watch the Duck | The God Box |
| "Ng'yekeleni" | 2017 | Cassper Nyovest | Thuto |
| "Nobody" | 2017 | Rapsody, Anderson .Paak, Moonchild | Laila's Wisdom |
| "Rest in Power" | 2018 | —N/a | Rest in Power: The Trayvon Martin Story (soundtrack) |
| "Roman Candles" | 2018 | The Alchemist, Roc Marciano | Bread |
| "Diamond Cutters" | 2018 | Roc Marciano | Behold a Dark Horse |
| "Cojiba" | 2018 | —N/a | Jamla Is the Squad II |
| "Bad to the Bone" | 2019 | Salaam Remi, Reek Muffin | Grass Is Greener (soundtrack) |
| "Make Noise" | 2019 | Rhymefest, Raheem Devaughn | The Public (soundtrack) |
| "Crowns for Kings" | 2019 | Benny the Butcher | The Plugs I Met |
| "Education" | 2019 | Freddie Gibbs, Yasiin Bey | Bandana |
| "Noir" | 2019 | Adrian Younge | Produced By: Adrian Younge |
| "Yah Yah" | 2020 | Eminem, Royce da 5'9", Q-Tip, Denaun | Music to Be Murdered By |
| "Hustle Don't Give" | 2020 | Apollo Brown, Che Noir | As God Intended |
| "Fight the Power: Remix 2020" | 2020 | Public Enemy, Nas, Rapsody, YG, Jahi, Questlove | What You Gonna Do When the Grid Goes Down? |
| "The Black Renaissance" | 2020 | Sa-Roc | The Sharecropper's Daughter |
| "O.G. Philosophy" | 2020 | Rhymefest, Raheem Devaughn | —N/a |
| "American Heartbreak" | 2020 | Ledisi | Between Me and the World (HBO Original Soundtrack) |
| "Say Peace" | 2020 | Common | A Beautiful Revolution Pt. 1 |
| "Is It Because I'm Black?" | 2020 | Salaam Remi, Syleena Johnson, Anthony Hamilton, Stephen Marley, Cee-Lo Green, Sandra Bland | Black on Purpose |
| "Father Figure" | 2020 | Tobe Nwigwe, Royce da 5'9" | Cincoriginals |
| "Ishkabibble's" | 2020 | Westside Gunn | Who Made the Sunshine |
| "Champion" (Remix) | 2020 | Liam Bailey | —N/a |
| "Pravda" | 2020 | Your Old Droog, Mach-Hommy, El-P, Tha God Fahim | Dump Yod |
| "The Healing" | 2020 | Statik Selektah | The Balancing Act |
| "Momentum" | 2020 | Russ, Benny the Butcher | Chomp |
| "Freedom Over Everything" | 2021 | Vince Mendoza | Freedom Over Everything |
| "#Toyland" | 2021 | Ray Angry | —N/a |
| "Welcome to America" | 2021 | C.S. Armstrong, Angela Hunte | Judas and the Black Messiah (soundtrack) |
| "When We Move" | 2021 | Common, Seun Kuti | A Beautiful Revolution, Part 2 |
| "Conquer & Divide" | 2021 | El Michels Affair, Liam Bailey | Ekundayo Inversions |
| "Rolling 110 Deep" | 2021 | DJ Kay Slay | Accolades |
| "Few Good Things" | 2022 | Saba, Eryn Allen Kane | Few Good Things |
| "Right Hand Man" | 2022 | Royce da 5'9" | The Heaven Experience Vol. 1 |
| "Freequency" | 2022 | Black Star | No Fear of Time |
| "The MoMa" | 2022 | Meechy Darko | Gothic Luxury |
| "Disgusting" | 2022 | Apathy | King of Gods. No Second |
| "Thunderdome [W.T.A.]" | 2023 | Portugal. The Man | Chris Black Changed My Life |
| "Workin (Timbaland Remix)" | 2023 | Corey Hawkins, Timbaland | The Color Purple (soundtrack) |
| "Drug Trade" | 2023 | Smoke DZA & Flying Lotus | Flying Objects |
| "Black (Know Matter What)" | 2023 | Black Rob | Life Story 2 |
| "Love Letter" | 2023 | —N/a | BET 50th Anniversary of Hip Hop Special |
| "Copy Cold" | 2024 | Mach-Hommy | #Richaxxhaitian |
| "REEKYOD" | 2024 | Madlib, Your Old Droog | —N/a |
| "Keep Winning" | 2024 | Freeway, Jake One | Stimulus Package 2 |
| "Still Here" | 2024 | Jay Electronica, Benny the Butcher, Freeway | Vote or Die |
| "Used to Love You (9th Wonder Playmates Imagining Remix)" | 2024 | John Legend | Get Lifted (20th anniversary Edition) |
| "Native Sons Part 2" | 2025 | Talib Kweli, J. Rawls & Javotti Media, Maseo, Posdnuos, Mike Gee, Afrika Baby Bam, Busta Rhymes | Javotti Media: Notes from the Underground |
| "The Revolution Will Not be Televised" | 2025 | Brian Jackson, Masters at Work | The Revolution Will Not be Televised |
| "Please, Stop the Violence in Hip-Hop" | 2025 | Juicy J | Caught Up In This Illusion |
| "Rudy Ray Moore" | 2025 | Errol Holden | —N/a |
| "En Eff" | 2025 | De La Soul | Cabin in the Sky |
| "The Moon Cave" | 2026 | Gorillaz, Asha Puthli, Bobby Womack, Dave Jolicoeur, Jalen Ngonda | The Mountain |
| "The Empty Dream Machine" | 2026 | Gorillaz, Johnny Marr, Anoushka Shankar | The Mountain |
| "The Sad God" | 2026 | Gorillaz, Ajay Prasanna, Johnny Marr, Anoushka Shankar | The Mountain |
| "TSOD" | 2026 | Blu & Exile, Mach-Hommy | Time Heals Everything |
| "P.O" | 2026 | IDK | e.t.d.s. A Mixtape by .idk. |
| "I Won't Be Afraid" | 2026 | The Game, Cool & Dre | The Documentary III |
| "40 Acres and a Ferrari" | 2026 | Kardinal Offishall, Stove God Cooks | Firestarter Vol 2: Everyday, Sometimes… |
| "Fame & Fiction" | Che Noir | It Takes A Village | |

== Music videos ==
Main

| Song | Artists | Album | Year |
|---|---|---|---|
| Rest in Power | —N/a | Rest in Power: The Trayvon Martin Story (soundtrack) | 2018 |
| Conception | —N/a | Streams of Thought Volume 2 | |
| Thought Vs. Everybody | —N/a | Streams of Thought Vol. 3 | 2020 |
| No Gold Teeth | Danger Mouse | Cheat Codes | 2022 |
| Aquamarine | Danger Mouse, Michael Kiwanuka | Cheat Codes | 2022 |
| Because | Danger Mouse, Russ, Joey Badass, Dylan Cartlidge | Cheat Codes | 2022 |
| Strangers | Danger Mouse, RTJ, ASAP Rocky | Cheat Codes | 2022 |
| Belize | Danger Mouse, MF Doom | Cheat Codes | 2022 |
| Glorious Game | El Michels Affair | Glorious Game | 2023 |
| Love Letter | —N/a | BET 50th Anniversary of Hip Hop Special | 2023 |
| UP | Danger Mouse | TBA | 2025 |

Featured
| Song | Artists | Album | Year |
|---|---|---|---|
| Appreciate | LaToya London | Love & Life | 2005 |
| Nobody But Me | Michael Buble | Nobody But Me | 2016 |
| Rise Up | Del the Funky Homosapian, Murs, Fashawn | Street Fighter (soundtrack) | 2016 |
| Noir | Adrian Younge | Produced by Adrian Younge | 2019 |
| Fight the Power: Remix 2020 | Public Enemy, Rapsody, YG, Nas, Questlove, Jahi | What You Gonna Do When the Grid Goes Down? | 2020 |
| Father Figure | Tobe Nwigwe, Royce da 5'9" | Cincoriginals | 2020 |
| Is It Because I'm Black? | Salaam Remi, Anthony Hamilton, CeeLo Green, Syleena Johnson, Stephen Marley | Black on Purpose | 2020 |
| Say Peace | Common | A Beautiful Revolution Pt. 1 | 2020 |
| #Toyland | Ray Angry | single | 2021 |
| When We Move | Common, Seun Kuti | A Beautiful Revolution Pt. 2 | 2021 |

== Filmography ==
- Bamboozled (2000)
- Brooklyn Babylon (2001)
- Perfume (2001)
- Brown Sugar (2002)
- Love Rome (2004)
- Explicit IIIs (2008)
- Night Catches Us (2010)
- On the Inside (2011)
- Yelling to the Sky (2011)
- Get On Up (2014)
- Stealing Cars (2015)
- The Deuce (2017)
- Unbreakable Kimmy Schmidt (2018)
- Don't Go Tellin' Your Momma (2021)
- Tick, Tick... Boom! (2021)
- Angry Birds Mystery Island (2024)
