= Love & Life (LaToya London album) =

Studio album by La Toya London
- Released: September 20, 2005
- Length: 58:03
- Label: Peak
- Producers: 3; B-RAD; John Burk; Barry J. Eastmond; Rex Rideout; Bradley Spalter; Stereo; Reed Vertenley; Narada Michael Walden

Love & Life is the debut studio album by LaToya London. It was released on September 20, 2005 through the record label Peak Records and distributed through Concord Records. The album features a mix of R&B, soul, jazz and hip-hop, and has sold approximately 73,000 copies since its release.

== Critical reception ==
Professional ratings
Review scores
Source	Rating
AllMusic	3/5 stars
WonderingSound.com	favorable

A reviewer from the San Francisco Chronicle called her "impassioned and polished" with "sumptuous, wondrously elastic mezzo pipes". A reviewer from People magazine called it one of the best post-American Idol albums, and a reviewer from iTunes named it one of the best albums of 2005, and her song "Non A What'cha Do" as one of the best individual recordings of the year.

== Commercial performance ==
Love & Life sold 12,546 albums in its first week, landing at number 82 on Billboard Top 200 Albums chart and at number 27 on Billboard Top R&B/Hip-Hop Albums. To date, it has sold approximately 58,000 copies, including 15,000 digital downloads.

== Singles ==
Love & Life spawned three singles: "Appreciate", "Every Part of Me", and "State of My Heart". "State of My Heart" reached number 40 on the US Billboard Adult Contemporary chart and number five on the radio industry periodical Friday Morning Quarterback's Adult Contemporary spin chart.

== Track listing ==
Love & Life track listing
No.	Title	Writer(s)	Producer(s)	Length
1.	"Scandalous"	Bradley Spalter; Lambert Waldrip II; Philip White	B-RAD; Stereo	4:18
2.	"Every Part of Me"	Michèle Vice-Maslin; Matthew Gerrard	Narada Michael Walden; Michael "Fish" Herring^{[a]}	3:27
3.	"Learn to Breathe"	Peer Åström	Walden; Sir Philippe Saisse^{[a]}	4:21
4.	"Appreciate" (featuring Black Thought)	LaToya London; Phil Scott; Aleese Simmons; Spalter; Nodesha Felix; Tariq Trotter	Spalter; 3	3:41
5.	"State of My Heart"	Carol Bayer Sager; David Foster; Linda Thompson	Walden; John Burk	4:42
6.	"Practice Makes Perfect"	Robbie Nevil; Reed Vertelney	Vertelney	3:35
7.	"Meet Me Halfway"	Barry J. Eastmond; Tiffany Palmer; Carlos Ricketts	Eastmond	4:02
8.	"Waiting for You"	Eastmond; London	Eastmond	4:55
9.	"Anything"	Omar Edwards; London	Edwards	5:19
10.	"Non a Whatcha Do"	London; Simmons; Andre Morton; Antwan "Amadeus" Thompson; Spalter; David Cochrane; Deborah Thomas	Spalter	4:15
11.	"I Can't Hide (What's in My Heart)"	Steve "Hollywood" Gaspár	Rex Rideout	4:07
12.	"More"	London; Rideout	Rideout	4:14
13.	"How I Love the Rain"	Ken Hirsch; Rosie Casey	Eastmond	5:10
14.	"All by Myself"	Eric Carmen	Eastmond	4:06

Notes

- ^{^[a]} denotes an associate producer

== Charts ==
Weekly chart performance for Love & Life
Chart (2005)	Peak position
US Billboard 200	82
US Top R&B/Hip-Hop Albums (Billboard)	27
