= Cheat Codes (album) =

Studio album by Danger Mouse and Black Thought
- Released: August 12, 2022
- Genre: Hip-hop
- Length: 38:19
- Label: BMG
- Producer: Danger Mouse

Black Thought chronology
Streams of Thought, Vol. 3: Cane & Able (2020)	Cheat Codes (2022)	Glorious Game (2023)

Danger Mouse chronology
Lux Prima (2019)	Cheat Codes (2022)	Into the Blue (2022)

Singles from Cheat Codes
- 1. "No Gold Teeth" Released: May 11, 2022; 2. "Because" Released: June 8, 2022; 3. "Aquamarine" Released: July 13, 2022; 4. "Strangers" Released: August 9, 2022

Cheat Codes is a collaborative studio album by American songwriter/producer Danger Mouse and American rapper Black Thought, released on August 12, 2022, by BMG. It followed three albums of solo work for Black Thought, but was Danger Mouse's first hip-hop album since The Mouse and the Mask in 2005.

Dates for the start of the album's production differ, including 2005 when the pair worked on their first tracks together, 2017 when they first had the idea for an album, and 2018 when the bulk of the work was started. After delays due to the COVID-19 pandemic and tracklist changes, it was first announced in a 2020 radio interview with Black Thought where he mentioned its draft title Dangerous Thoughts.

== Promotional campaign ==
The first single from the album, "No Gold Teeth", was issued on May 11, 2022. It was accompanied by a promotional video in which Black Thought raps while his head is permanently obscured by changing images.

The second single to be released was "Because" on June 8. This was promoted by another UNCANNY directed video, released nearly a month later on July 7.

A third single and accompanying video, "Aquamarine", followed on July 13. The final pre-LP single, "Strangers", emerged on August 9, three days before the album's release. A promotional video for the song followed on August 12 to coincide with the release of the album.

After the album's release, a video for the MF Doom collaboration, "Belize", was released on October 18.

== Critical reception ==
Professional ratings
Aggregate scores
Source	Rating
AnyDecentMusic?	8.1/10
Metacritic	83/100
Review scores
Source	Rating
AllMusic	4.5/5 stars
Beats per Minute	78%
Clash	8/10
DIY	4/5 stars
The Guardian	4/5 stars
HipHopDX	4.6/5
NME	4/5 stars
The Observer	5/5 stars
Pitchfork	7.2/10
Rolling Stone	3.5/5 stars

Upon release, Cheat Codes was met with critical acclaim. At Metacritic, which assigns a normalized rating out of 100 to reviews from professional publications, the album received an average score of 83, based on 17 reviews.

Reviewing the album for AllMusic, Andy Kellman described it as a combination of "'60s and '70s psych, prog, and soul recordings that are moody, trippy, and sometimes eerie. The crisp if soot-coated drums, smeared strings, moaning organs, and gnarled guitars are all very compatible with Thought, who scythes through it all with unparalleled wordplay delivered with surgical precision."

Former US President Barack Obama listed "Belize" as one of his favourite tracks of 2022.

=== Accolades ===
Year-end lists for Cheat Codes
Publication	List	Rank	Ref.
Albumism	The 100 Best Albums of 2022	12	
Clash	Albums of the Year 2022	18	
Consequence	Top 50 Albums of 2022	32	
The Guardian	The 50 Best Albums of 2022	46	
The Line of Best Fit	The Best Albums of 2022	7	
Loud and Quiet	Albums of the Year 2022	17	
Mojo	The 50 Best Albums of 2022	3	
NME	The 50 Best Albums of 2022	34	
PopMatters	The 80 Best Albums of 2022	63	
Under the Radar	Top 100 Albums of 2022	82	

== Track listing ==
No.	Title	Writer(s)	Length
1.	"Sometimes"	Brian Joseph Burton; Clarence Reid; Tarik Trotter	2:10
2.	"Cheat Codes"	B. Burton; Lester Johnson; Matthew Watson; Michael Liggins; Robert Townsend; Trotter	2:14
3.	"The Darkest Part" (featuring Raekwon and Kid Sister)	B. Burton; Corey Woods; Dean Josiah Cover; Pauline Matthews; Samuel Benjamin Cohen; Trotter	3:44
4.	"No Gold Teeth"	B. Burton; Jerry Ragovoy; Mort Shuman; Trotter	2:33
5.	"Because" (featuring Joey Bada$$, Russ, and Dylan Cartlidge)	Dorian Burton; Dylan Cartlidge; Herman Kelly; Jo-Vaughn Virginie Scott; Russell James Vitale; Trotter	4:41
6.	"Belize" (featuring MF Doom)	D. Burton; Daniel Thompson Dumile; George Stavis; Trotter	3:54
7.	"Aquamarine" (featuring Michael Kiwanuka)	Barry Stoller; Berrie Wilson; B. Burton; Cover; Jean-Pierre Alarcen; Michael Kiwanuka; Trotter	3:58
8.	"Identical Deaths"	B. Burton; Colin Catt; Phil Gunn; Trotter	2:41
9.	"Strangers" (featuring A$AP Rocky and Run the Jewels)	B. Burton; Dylan Cartlidge; Jaime Meline; Mark Wirtz; Michael Santiago Render; Rakim Athelston Mayers; Trotter	4:08
10.	"Close to Famous"	B. Burton; Trotter	2:28
11.	"Saltwater" (featuring Conway the Machine)	B. Burton; Claudio Canali; Demond Price; Guiseppe Cossa; Trotter	3:22
12.	"Violas and Lupitas"	B. Burton; Trotter; Tom Joe White	2:21
Total length:			38:19

=== Samples ===
- "Sometimes" contains samples from Gwen McCrae's "Love Without Sex".
- "The Darkest Part" contains samples from Kiki Dee's "Rest My Head".
- "No Gold Teeth" contains samples from Hugh Masekela's "Stop".
- "Because" contains samples from "You Don't Have to Worry" by Doris & Kelly.
- "Belize" contains samples from Federal Duck's "Peace in My Mind".
- "Identical Deaths" contains samples from "Future Recollections" by Raw Material.
- "Strangers" contains samples from Philwit & Pegasus.
- "Saltwater" contains samples from "L'Amico Suicida" by Biglietto Per L'Inferno.
- "Violas & Lupitas" contains samples from the film Harlem Nights.

== Personnel ==
- Black Thought – vocals, engineering
- Danger Mouse – production, engineering
- Kennie Takahashi – mixing, engineering
- Bob Weston – mastering
- Jacob Escobedo – cover art
- Samantha Meadows – layout

== Charts ==
Chart performance for Cheat Codes
Chart (2022)	Peak position
Australian Digital Albums (ARIA)	14
Australian Hitseekers Albums (ARIA)	1
Australian Physical Albums (ARIA)	25
Belgian Albums (Ultratop Flanders)	76
Belgian Albums (Ultratop Wallonia)	106
Dutch Albums (Album Top 100)	38
German Albums (Offizielle Top 100)	8
New Zealand Albums (RMNZ)	33
Scottish Albums (Official Charts)	8
Swiss Albums (Schweizer Hitparade)	12
UK Albums (Official Charts)	28
UK Independent Albums (Official Charts)	4
UK R&B Albums (Official Charts)	1
US Billboard 200	43
