= Streams of Thought, Vol. 1 =

EP by Black Thought
- Released: June 1, 2018
- Genre: Hip-hop
- Length: 17:15
- Label: Human Re Sources
- Producers: 9th Wonder; Khrysis

Black Thought chronology
...And Then You Shoot Your Cousin (with The Roots) (2014)	Streams of Thought, Vol. 1 (2018)	Streams of Thought, Vol. 2 (2018)

Streams of Thought, Vol. 1 is the debut EP by American emcee Black Thought. It was released on June 1, 2018, by the independent distributor Human Re Sources. Primarily produced by 9th Wonder, with one contribution from Khrysis of The Soul Council, it marks Black Thought's first solo release, having previously released 11 albums with his band The Roots. The EP features guest appearances by Rapsody, Styles P, and KIRBY.

== Background ==
Black Thought originally planned to release his debut solo album, Masterpiece Theater, in 2000. However, the album was shelved and most of its songs ended up on The Roots' Phrenology album in 2002. Another album, Dangerous Thoughts, with producer Danger Mouse was also shelved. On December 14, 2017, Black Thought performed a ten-minute freestyle on Hot 97, which quickly went viral and created a buzz for a potential solo project. The following month, he revealed that he was working on an EP with the producer 9th Wonder. On May 25, 2018, the title of the EP and its release date were revealed. The song "Making a Murderer", featuring Styles P, was previously released in 2016.

== Critical reception ==
Professional ratings
Aggregate scores
Source	Rating
Metacritic	81/100
Review scores
Source	Rating
And It Don't Stop	A−
HipHopDX	4.5/5
Pitchfork	7.5/10
Rolling Stone	3.5/5 stars
Tom Hull – on the Web	B+

Streams of Thought, Vol. 1 was met with widespread critical acclaim. At Metacritic, which assigns a normalized rating out of 100 to reviews from mainstream publications, the EP received an average score of 81, based on four reviews.

Reviewing for HipHopDX in June 2018, Riley Wallace hailed Streams of Thought as "one of the most exciting things to happen to Hip Hop in a long time", also stating, "With 9th's soulful production taking the place of The Roots, and features that complement without under-performing or overtaking, the project delivers a healthy dose of social consciousness, braggadocios fare, and even a little subtle shade." Pitchfork's Brian Josephs called it "a small testament to his sustained excellence", while praising Black Thought's ability to thrill listeners "with internal rhymes and flow swaps that manage to fold years of experience and culture references into crisp narratives." Mosi Reeves of Rolling Stone stated, "True to the title, he doesn't offer any choruses, just streams of verses that cover his own lyrical prowess, history and politics, and whatever else comes to mind", also noting the "spare and subtle" production, which "leaves the focus on Black Thought's words." In his "Consumer Guide" column, Robert Christgau said the EP "never bogs down" and features "9th Wonder soul samples" that could be mistaken for Questlove's drumming, while citing the first track "Twofifteen" as its most "exciting" point. Fellow critic Tom Hull said it "sounds like half of a pretty good Roots album".

== Commercial performance ==
Streams of Thought, Vol. 1 debuted at number 62 on the Billboard 200, with 9,864 album-equivalent units, which includes 7,978 in pure album sales.

== Track listing ==
No.	Title	Writer(s)	Producer(s)	Length
1.	"Twofifteen"	Tariq Trotter; Patrick Douthit	9th Wonder	3:45
2.	"9th vs. Thought"	Trotter; Douthit	9th Wonder	2:47
3.	"Dostoyevsky" (featuring Rapsody)	Trotter; Douthit; Marlanna Evans	9th Wonder	3:53
4.	"Making a Murderer" (featuring Styles P)	Trotter; Douthit; David Styles	9th Wonder	4:32
5.	"Thank You" (featuring KIRBY)	Trotter; Douthit; Kirby Dockery	Khrysis	2:18
Total length:				17:15

== Charts ==
Chart (2018)	Peak position
US Billboard 200	62
US Top R&B/Hip-Hop Albums (Billboard)	33
US Independent Albums (Billboard)	7
