= Kirby Lauryen =

American singer and songwriter

- Born: Kirby Lauryen Dockery; Memphis, Tennessee, U.S.
- Genres: R&B, neo soul
- Occupations: Singer, songwriter
- Years active: 2012–present
- Website: singkirbysing.com

Kirby Lauryen Dockery, also known mononymously as Kirby (stylized as KIRBY), is an American singer and songwriter. She has written pop songs for artists such as Rihanna, Kanye West, and Paul McCartney's 2015 single "FourFiveSeconds". As a recording artist herself, she released her first album, Sis, in 2020.

== Life and career ==
Dockery was born in Memphis, Tennessee and raised in Southaven, Mississippi. She studied music at Stax Music Academy, and enrolled at Berklee College of Music after high school but left in 2009 to pursue music full-time. She was influenced by Kanye West's The College Dropout.

She began a YouTube challenge where she posted videos of herself singing a new original song for 275 days. She was contacted by Joy Brown of Roc Nation on day 302 of the challenge and signed to the label.

She has worked with artists such as Christina Aguilera, Jennifer Lopez, Brandy, and Timbaland. Kirby co-wrote the track "FourFiveSeconds", which went through several rounds of edits as directed by Kanye West. She also wrote the song "Die with You" performed by Beyoncé and "Break Your Heart Right Back" by Ariana Grande.

She released her first album, Sis, in February 2020. Robyn Mowatt of Okayplayer referred to it as "a mashup of refreshing deep cuts." Two singles from the album were featured on the soundtrack for the fourth season of Insecure.

In June 2020, Kirby posted a viral TikTok video about the racist origins of the pancake brand Aunt Jemima, and amid other online critiques taking place, the brand announced that they would retire the racist imagery.

Her second album, Miss Black America, was released in August 2025. The album is deeply influenced by Kirby's enslaved ancestors and their collective roots in Mississippi.

On November 26, 2025, Kirby appeared on the Tamron Hall show on ABC, as part of their Friendsgiving episode, discussing her ‘A Song A Day’ challenge, and her first album, Sis, from 2020. She also performed on the show, live in the studio.

In May 2026, she debuted the music video for her song "Saving Grace", as a promotional tie-in with the Amazon Prime Video series Spider-Noir.

== Discography ==
=== Studio albums ===
- Sis. He Wasn't the One (2021)
- Miss Black America (2025)

=== Extended plays ===
- Sis. (2020)
- I Told You I Would (2022)

=== Soundtrack albums ===
- Swarm (with Childish Gambino) (2023)

=== Singles ===
Title	Year	Album
"Loved by You"	2016	Non-album single
"Vain"	2017	Non-album single
"Kool Aid"	2019	Sis.
"Don't Leave Your Girl"	2019	Sis.
"We Don't Funk"	2020	Sis.
"Velvet (Remix)" (featuring Lucky Daye) (from Insecure)	2020	Non-album single
"Black Leaves"	2022	Non-album single
"Saving Grace"	2026	Non-album single

== Songwriting credits ==
indicates a credited vocal/featured artist contribution

Title	Year	Artist(s)	Album	Credits	Written with
"J'irai te chercher"	2014	Amel Bent	Instinct	Co-writer	Amel Bent, Simon Cohen, Aymeric Mazaudier, and Kore
"The Game"	2014	Kelly Rowland	Pepsi Beats of the Beautiful Game	Co-writer	Jake Troth, and Sia Furler
"Let It Be Me"	2014	Jennifer Lopez	A.K.A.	Co-writer	Harmony Samuels and Jennifer Lopez
"She"	2014	Keyshia Cole	Point of No Return	Co-writer	Keyshia Cole, Sean Fenton, Dijon McFarlane, and Priese Board
"Hustle Harder" (featuring Snoh Aalegra and Dreezy)	2014	Common	Nobody's Smiling	Co-writer	Lonnie Lynn, Ernest Wilson, Snoh Nowrozi, Seandrea Sledge, Alexander Izquierdo, and Leon Michels
"Break Your Heart Right Back" (featuring Childish Gambino)	2014	Ariana Grande	My Everything	Co-writer	Andrew "Pop" Wansel, Warren "Oak" Felder, Donald Glover, Bernard Edwards, Nile Rodgers, Steven Jordan, Christopher Wallace, Sean Combs, and Mason Betha
"Only One" (featuring Paul McCartney)	2014	Kanye West	Non-album single	Co-writer	Kanye West, Paul McCartney, Mike Dean, and Noah Goldstein
"Crazy"	2015	Kat Dahlia	My Garden	Co-writer	Glass John
"FourFiveSeconds"	2015	Rihanna, Kanye West, and Paul McCartney	Non-album single	Co-writer	Kanye West, Paul McCartney, Mike Dean, Tyrone Griffin, Jr., David Longstreth, Robyn Fenty, Dallas Austin, Elon Rutberg, and Noah Goldstein
"Die with You"	2015	Beyoncé	Non-album single	Co-writer	Beyoncé
"If I Have To"	2015	Avery Wilson	Non-album single	Co-writer	Avery Wilson, Rodney Jerkins, and Sean Garrett
"The Otherside"	2015	Elijah Blake	Shadows & Diamonds	Co-writer	Sean Fenton and Carlo Montagnese
"Rockabye"	2015	Elijah Blake	Shadows & Diamonds	Co-writer	Sean Fenton, Christopher Crowhurst, and Anthony Charles Williams II
"Aquaria" (featuring Deradoorian)	2015	Boots	Aquaria	Co-writer	Jordan Asher and Angel Deradoorian
"Over Getting Over"	2015	Fleur East	Love, Sax and Flashbacks	Co-writer	Andrew "Pop" Wansel, Warren "Oak" Felder, and Trevor "Trevorious" Brown
"Never Say When"	2015	Fleur East	Love, Sax and Flashbacks	Co-writer	Fleur East, Andrew "Pop" Wansel, and Warren "Oak" Felder
"Love Just Ain't Enough" (featuring Timbaland)	2015	Monica	Code Red	Co-writer	Monica Brown, Nick Brongers, Jocelyn Donald, Timothy Mosley, and Jonathan Solone-Myvett
"Call My Name"	2015	Monica	Code Red	Co-writer	Monica Brown, Jocelyn Donald, Daniel Jones, Jamal Jones, Timothy Mosley, and Jonathan Solone-Myvett
"All Men Lie" (featuring Timbaland)	2015	Monica	Code Red	Co-writer	Monica Brown, Nick Brongers, and Timothy Mosley
"Beggin & Pleadin"	2016	Brandy	Non-album single	Co-writer	Ronald Colson, Andrew "Pop" Wansel, Warren "Oak" Felder, John Lee Hooker, Steve Mostyn, and Brandy Norwood
"Wolves"	2016	Kanye West	The Life of Pablo	Co-writer	Kanye West, Sia Furler, Victor Mensah, Magnus August Høiberg, Alan Stanley Soucy Brinsmead, Noah Goldstein, Elon Rutberg, Cydel Young, Ryan McDermott, Mike Dean, Caroline Shaw, and Pat Reynolds
"Nothing Even Matters" (featuring KIRBY)	2016	Kevin Ross	Non-album single	Co-writer/Featured artist	Kevin Ross
"Will You Fight"	2017	La'Porsha Renae	Already All Ready	Co-writer	La'Porsha Renae, Edgar "Johnny Velvet" Etienne, and Harmony Samuels
"Tell Me You Love Me"	2017	Demi Lovato	Tell Me You Love Me	Co-writer	Ajay Bhattacharyya and John Hill
"Twice"	2018	Christina Aguilera	Liberation	Writer/Producer	None
"Accelerate" (featuring Ty Dolla Sign and 2 Chainz)	2018	Christina Aguilera	Liberation	Co-writer	Christina Aguilera, Kanye West, Mike Dean, Che Pope, Ernest Brown, Carlton Davis Mays, Jr., Bibi Bourelly, Ilsey Juber, Tayla Parx, Tyrone Griffin, Jr., Tauheed Epps, and Ronald Brown
"Thank You" (featuring KIRBY)	2018	Black Thought	Streams of Thought, Vol. 1	Co-writer/Featured artist	Tariq Trotter and Patrick Douthit
"Don't Walk Away"	2020	John Legend	Bigger Love	Co-writer	John Stephens, Stephen McGregor, and Mikyala Simpson
