= Die with You =

Promotional single by Beyoncé
- Released: April 4, 2017
- Genre: R&B
- Length: 3:39
- Label: Parkwood; Columbia
- Songwriter: Kirby Lauryen Dockery Beyoncé Knowles

"Die with You" is a song by American recording artist Beyoncé. She originally released the song in 2015, for her seventh wedding anniversary, along with a music video of her performing at a piano and wearing a baseball cap. On April 4, 2017, she released another video for the song to commemorate her and Jay-Z's nine-year anniversary. The second one, available only on Tidal, features home footage.

== Composition ==
An R&B ballad, "Die with You" is written in the key of A♭ major with a tempo of 106 beats per minute in 3/4 time. Beyoncé's vocals span from D♭_{3} to E♭_{5} in the song.

== Critical reception ==
Entertainment Weekly described the song as a "soft, simple ballad" praising "when [Beyoncé] belts the bridge, her powerhouse voice is on full display".

Raisa Bruner of Time reflected about the lyrics, which "seems like a fair statement on their current status" after their studio albums Lemonade and 4:44, stressing that "2017 promises to be especially fruitful for the couple, given that they’re expecting twins this summer".

Alex Hudson of Exclaim! wrote that even if the quality of the audio and video "isn't greateve" Beyoncè's voice "sounds great as usual, and the shaky handheld camerawork adds to the intimacy".

== Charts ==
Weekly chart performance for "Die with You"
| Chart (2017) | Peak position |
|---|---|
| Australia (ARIA) | 61 |
| France (SNEP) | 51 |
| Italy (Musica e dischi) | 30 |
| New Zealand Heatseekers (RMNZ) | 9 |
| Scotland Singles (OCC) | 15 |
| Spain (PROMUSICAE) | 44 |
| UK Singles (OCC) | 62 |
| US Bubbling Under Hot 100 (Billboard) | 21 |

== Release history ==
Release dates for "Die with You"
| Region | Date | Format | Ref. |
|---|---|---|---|
| United States | April 4, 2017 | Digital download | |
