= Streams of Thought, Vol. 2 =

EP by Black Thought
- Released: November 26, 2018
- Genre: Hip-hop
- Length: 23:28
- Labels: Human Re Sources; Passyunk
- Producer: Salaam Remi

Black Thought chronology
Streams of Thought, Vol. 1 (2018)	Streams of Thought, Vol. 2 (2018)	Streams of Thought, Vol. 3: Cane & Able (2020)

Streams of Thought, Vol. 2 (also known as Streams of Thought, Vol. 2: Traxploitation) is the second extended play by American emcee Black Thought. It was released on November 26, 2018, by independent distributors Human Re Sources and Passyunk Productions. Produced entirely by Salaam Remi, the EP is the sequel to Streams of Thought, Vol. 1, released five months earlier.

== Critical reception ==
Professional ratings
Review scores
Source	Rating
And It Don't Stop	A
HipHopDX	4.5/5
Tom Hull – on the Web	A−

Streams of Thought, Vol. 2 was met with positive reviews. Writing for HipHopDX in December 2018, Riley Wallace praised Remi's production, calling it "reminiscent of classic Motown sessions", and concluded, "Though Salaam does little to push Black Thought outside of his comfort zone, it does little to distract from how solid this project is, and the lyrical depth and complexity of all nine tracks." In his "Consumer Guide" column, Robert Christgau applauded the rapper for showing "how conscious a romantic lead's conscience can be" and wrote in summary that, "no longer hemmed in by album concepts or fusion-band masquerade, here’s where Tariq Trotter is freed to turn out kick-ass rap mixtapes and show off how much reading he does." Fellow critic Tom Hull, who had deemed the first volume as "half of a pretty good Roots album", said Vol. 2 is the "second half of that Roots album even stronger, with no reason to miss the live band".

== Track listing ==
- All tracks written by Tariq Trotter and Salaam Remi; all tracks produced by Salaam Remi.

No.	Title	Length
1.	"Fentanyl"	1:57
2.	"Soundtrack to Confusion"	3:11
3.	"Get Outlined"	3:29
4.	"History Unfolds"	1:21
5.	"How to Hold a Choppa"	1:31
6.	"The New Grit"	1:49
7.	"Long Liveth"	2:38
8.	"Streets" (featuring Tish Hyman)	3:15
9.	"Conception" (featuring Reek Ruffin)	4:14
Total length:		23:28

Notes

- Reek Ruffin is Black Thought's alias as a singer.

== Charts ==
Chart (2018)	Peak position
US Independent Albums (Billboard)	18
