= El Michels Affair =

- Origin: Brooklyn, New York, U.S.
- Genres: Funk; soul; hip hop; jazz
- Years active: 2000–present
- Labels: Big Crown, Truth & Soul, Fat Beats
- Website: elmichelsaffair.com

El Michels Affair is an American cinematic soul group led by musician and producer Leon Michels. Based in New York, the group is noted for its wide-ranging influences, analog production approach, and hip hop collaborations. The group released its first single in August 2002, and its debut album Sounding Out the City in 2005. After touring behind Raekwon and other Wu-Tang Clan members, the group recorded the popular cover album Enter the 37th Chamber in 2009. After releasing other tribute albums in the following decade, El Michels Affair returned with the original albums Adult Themes in 2020 and Yeti Season in 2021. Since then, the group has released collaborative projects with Freddie Gibbs & Madlib, Liam Bailey, and Black Thought, including 2023's Glorious Game.

== History ==
Michels played with Soul Fire Records house band The Mighty Imperials before forming his own ensemble in 2002. This group released singles for Soul Fire and for Misty, a sublabel of Daptone Records, as well as a full-length album which was released on the Michels-cofounded label Truth & Soul Records in 2005. Titled Sounding Out the City, the album drew from library music and afrobeat influences. After performing with Raekwon at a concert, the group began working with other members of the Wu-Tang Clan and covered several of their songs for vinyl single releases. By 2009, this had yielded an album's worth of material, which was released in 2009 as Enter the 37th Chamber, the name is a play on the album Enter the Wu-Tang (36 Chambers). El Michels Affair followed this with a second album of arrangements of songs by Wu-Tang Clan and from its members' solo releases, titled Return to the 37th Chamber.

In 2019, they accompanied Freddie Gibbs and Madlib at their popular NPR Tiny Desk performance and later recorded The Diamond Mine Sessions with them.

El Michels Affair began the 2020s with new original material; they released their album Adult Themes in 2020 and followed it less than a year later with the Turkish pop and prog-inspired Yeti Season in March 2021; the album features vocals from Hindi language singer Piya Malik and The Shacks.

On September 5th, 2025, El Michels Affair released 24 Hr Sports. The album features collaborations with Dave Guy, Clairo, and Norah Jones, and was inspired by fashion and graphic design of the 1980s and 90s, Sports Illustrated magazines and certain works by MF Doom.

== Personnel ==
- Leon Michels – bandleader and producer, tenor saxophone, flute, keyboards, guitar, bass, percussion, engineering

Other contributors include:

- Homer Steinweiss – drums
- Nick Movshon – bass, drums, guitar
- Thomas Brenneck – guitar, bass
- Michael Leonhart – trumpet, brass
- Toby Pazner – keyboards
- Aaron Johnson – trombone
- Sean Solomon – guitar
- Dave Guy – trumpet
- Marco Benevento – keyboards

== Discography ==
=== Studio albums ===
Title	Details
Sounding Out the City	Released: August 23, 2005; Label: Truth & Soul; Format: LP, CD, digital
Adult Themes	Released: May 8, 2020; Label: Big Crown; Format: LP, CD, digital
Yeti Season	Released: March 26, 2021; Label: Big Crown; Format: LP, CD, digital
Glorious Game (with Black Thought)	Released: April 14, 2023; Label: Big Crown; Format: LP, CD, digital
24 Hr Sports	Released: September 5, 2025; Label: Big Crown; Format: LP, CD, cassette, digital

=== Tribute & remix albums ===
Title	Details
Enter the 37th Chamber	Released: April 21, 2009; Label: Fat Beats; Format: LP, CD, cassette, digital; Wu-Tang Clan cover album
Walk on By (A Tribute to Isaac Hayes) EP	Released: 2009 (12") / November 12, 2010 (CD); Label: Truth & Soul; Format: 12", CD; Isaac Hayes cover album
Return to the 37th Chamber	Released: April 14, 2017; Label: Big Crown; Format: LP, CD, cassette, digital; Wu-Tang Clan cover album
Ekundayo Inversions (with Liam Bailey)	Released: August 13, 2021; Label: Big Crown; Format: LP, CD, digital; Collaborative remix album of Ekundayo

=== EPs ===
Title	Details
PJs... from Afar (with Raekwon)	Released: March 1, 2007; Label: Truth & Soul; Format: 12", CD, digital
Loose Change	Released: 2014; Label: Truth & Soul; Format: 12", CD, digital; Outtakes from Sounding Out the City
The Diamond Mine Sessions (with Freddie Gibbs & Madlib)	Released: May 7, 2020; Label: Madlib Invazion/ESGN/Keep Cool/RCA; Format: digital; Reinterpretation of tracks from Bandana

=== Singles ===
Title (A-side/B-side)	Year	Album	Label	Format
"Detroit Twice" / "Too Late to Turn Back"	2003	Sounding Out the City	Misty	7"
"Creation" / "Behind the Blue Curtains"	2005	Sounding Out the City	Truth & Soul	7"
"C.R.E.A.M" / "Glaciers of Ice" (Wu-Tang Clan cover)	2006	Enter the 37th Chamber	Truth & Soul	7"
"Duel of the Iron Mic" / "Bring da Ruckus" (Wu-Tang cover)	2006	Enter the 37th Chamber	Truth & Soul	7"
"Musings to Myself" / "Spread Your Soul"	2008		Truth & Soul	7"
"4th Chamber" / "Snakes" (Wu-Tang cover)	2016	Return to the 37th Chamber	Big Crown	7"
"Tearz" / "Verbal Intercourse"	2016	Return to the 37th Chamber	Big Crown	7"
"Strange Boy" / "No Surprise" (feat. The Shacks)	2016	Non-album single	Big Crown	7", digital
"Shadow Boxin" / "Iron Maiden" (Wu-Tang cover)	2017	Return to the 37th Chamber	Big Crown	7"
"Never Be Another You"	2018	Non-album single	Big Crown	7"
"Unathi" / "Zaharilia" (feat. Piya Malik)	2018	Yeti Season	Big Crown	7", digital
"12345678910"	2019	Non-album singles	Big Crown	digital
"Reasons" (feat. Bobby Oroza) / "Hipps"	2020	Non-album singles	Big Crown	7", digital
"Dhuaa" (feat. Piya Malik)	2020	Yeti Season	Big Crown	digital
"Sha Na Na" (feat. The Shacks)	2020	Yeti Season	Big Crown	digital
"Murkit Gem" (feat. Piya Malik)	2021	Yeti Season	Big Crown	7", digital
"Ala Vida"	2021	Yeti Season	Big Crown	digital
"Fazed Out"	2021	Yeti Season	Big Crown	digital
"Awkward (Take 2)" (with Liam Bailey)	2021	Ekundayo Inversions (with Liam Bailey)	Big Crown	digital
"Anticipate" (feat. Clairo)	2025	24 Hr Sports	Big Crown	digital

== See also ==
- Menahan Street Band
