= Pennies in a Jar =

Studio album by Nikki Jean
- Released: July 12, 2011
- Recorded: 2009–2011
- Genre: Pop; soul
- Length: 41:46
- Label: S-Curve Records
- Producer: Sam Hollander, Dave Katz

Pennies in a Jar is the debut album by American singer-songwriter Nikki Jean. It was released on July 12, 2011, by indie label S-Curve Records. The album contains twelve soul and pop songs reminiscent of 1970s and 1980s music.

Jean, who was best known for her feature appearances with rapper Lupe Fiasco, contacted producer Sam Hollander in 2008 to discuss a solo career. Jean had a passion for songwriting, and Hollander came up with the concept for the album: she would travel the United States and co-write each song with one iconic songwriter, including Carole King, Burt Bacharach and Bob Dylan. Pennies in a Jar was produced by Hollander and Dave Katz.

Jean spent two years writing the songs. The album was originally to be released by Columbia Records, but they dropped the project in October 2011 after finding the music was more mature than they anticipated, and S-Curve later picked it up. Despite receiving positive reviews, the songs failed to chart except in Japan, where the single "My Love" reached No. 8. In his autobiography, Hollander wrote that he had "under-thought the greatest idea ever and hung [Jean] out to dry in the process. [...] This was easily the biggest miss of my career".

== Background ==
American singer-songwriter Nikki Jean was best known as a featuring artist on the 2007 album Lupe Fiasco's The Cool and its single "Hip Hop Saved My Life". However, despite her success, Jean did not want to be a hip-hop artist and wanted to make a "conceptually unified" singer-songwriter album in the vein of Carole King's Tapestry (1971). She had harbored an interest in songwriting since she was five, when she watched Irving Berlin's 100th birthday.

In 2008, Jean visited producer Sam Hollander to discuss her ambitions for a solo career. She sought him out for his work on Carole King's 2001 album Love Makes the World, which surprised Hollander, who assumed that she wanted to make a hip-hop album due to his previous work. He contacted her again and proposed an idea for her debut album: Jean would travel the United States and co-write each song with an iconic pop songwriter. She described herself to journalist Jim Fusilli as an "unlikely candidate" to carry out the concept but believed that her lack of success allowed her to approach each writer as a fan who wanted to learn from them.

== Recording ==
For over two years, Jean embarked on a journey to collaborate with songwriters all across the United States, visiting them at their homes and studios. Production was helmed by Hollander and Dave Katz. Hollander contacted Paul Williams and Carole King, while Jody Gerson reached out to songwriters such as Burt Bacharach and Lamont Dozier. However, when he received the demos, Hollander felt that some of their co-writers were attempting to emulate "current rhythmic shit without having much, if any, understanding of the Black Eyed Peas and T Pain [sic] ruling radio at the time." He and Katz had to "do a lot of doctoring to make it cohesive".

Columbia Records originally agreed to market the album in 2008 and funded the project with a budget of $200,000 but dropped it in October 2010. Hollander wrote that Columbia found the music "a bit 'more mature'" than they anticipated, while Jean said she was told that "nobody cares about these writers". She sold homemade cookies online to pay for her rent.

Hollander had introduced Bob Dylan to Jean's work. After she was dropped from Columbia, his manager Jeff Rosen explained that while Dylan did not write with others directly, he did occasionally allow them to complete unfinished songs. Dylan sent her two songs which already had melodies and lyrics and suggested that she complete them by writing a verse and a bridge. This resulted in "Steel and Feathers (Don't Ever)"—the song was originally written for Shot of Love (1981) but had been left unfinished until Jean worked on it, quickly earning Dylan's approval.

In January 2011, the album was picked up by S-Curve Records. Jean signed with the label in March. The album, titled Pennies in a Jar, was released on July 12, 2011.

== Composition ==
Pennies in a Jar contains twelve songs. The music was described by journalists as Jean's original take on the style of pop music of the '60s, '70s and '80s. Each of the songs were co-written by a well-known songwriter who flourished during this period.

Pennies in a Jar opens with the Philadelphia soul of "How to Unring a Bell", co-written with Thom Bell, with a backdrop of pedal steel and strings. "Steel and Feathers (Don't Ever)" is a gospel and country devotional based on one of Dylan's previously unfinished songs. The album continues with the Luigi Creatore collaboration "La Di Da Di Da", "My Love", whose sound is alike to Lamont Dozier's work at Motown, and the "slow-motion dream world sound" of the Bacharach-co-penned title track.

"What's a Girl Supposed to Do" was co-written with Jeff Barry and inspired by girl groups' music, and "Rockaway" with Carole King. The rappers Lupe Fiasco and Black Thought feature on "Million Star Motel", which was co-written with Bobby Braddock. "Patty Crash" and "China" were co-written with Paul Williams and Jimmy Webb, respectively. "Mercy of Love" was written by Jean and the songwriting couple Barry Mann and Cynthia Weil; it is a ballad which combines '60s girl-group music and modern pop. "Sex, Lies & Sunshine" was a collaboration with Carly Simon.

== Reception ==
=== Promotion and performance ===
Jean promoted Pennies in a Jar through appearances on the Late Show with David Letterman, Tavis Smiley, Weekend Edition Saturday and Live from Daryl's House. "La Di Da Di Da" featured in a Best Buy advertising campaign for HTC Status. The album debuted at No. 16 on the Billboard Heatseekers Albums charts, and "My Love" reached the Top 10 singles in Japan. However, Pennies in a Jar otherwise failed to reach the charts. Hollander reflected in his autobiography that ultimately "none of it amounted to anything of significance" for those involved.

In my mind, I'd totally failed Nikki. She'd come to me so wide-eyed and excited, and I had led her down a road that, though life altering in theory, put so much undue pressure on her to deliver the next to impossible. I'd underthought the greatest idea ever and hung her out to dry in the process. She deserved better. This was easily the biggest miss of my career, and man, it stung.

— Sam Hollander, 21-Hit Wonder: Flopping My Way to the Top of the Charts (2022)

=== Critical reception ===
Despite its poor commercial performance, Pennies in a Jar received positive reviews from music journalists. AllMusic's Andy Kellman said that the album was "very easy to enjoy, voiced by a remarkably refined artist who is neither squarely R&B nor pop", considering Jean a worthy songwriter and the songs' composition "appropriately classicist". Jim Fusilli of The Wall Street Journal wrote that she "sings with warmth and sincerity, and while many of the compositions bring to mind the work of her famous counterparts, she's in there too." Billboard's review opined that Jean "[excelled] when she plays into her collaborators’ strengths", praising the production and arrangements as "sounding breezy and simple, yet [it was] far more accomplished than most modern R&B".

== Track listing ==
No.	Title	Writer(s)	Producer(s)	Length
1.	"How to Unring a Bell"	Nikki Jean; Thom Bell	Sam Hollander	3:00
2.	"Steel and Feathers (Don't Ever)"	Jean; Bob Dylan	Hollander	3:45
3.	"La Di Da Di Da"	Jean; Luigi Creatore; Dave Katz; Hollander	Hollander	3:11
4.	"My Love"	Jean; Lamont Dozier; Hollander; Katz	Hollander	3:30
5.	"Pennies in a Jar"	Jean; Burt Bacharach	Hollander	3:44
6.	"What's a Girl Supposed to Do"	Jean; Jeff Barry	Hollander	2:57
7.	"Rockaway"	Jean; Carole King; Jill Conniff; Hollander; David Schommer	Hollander	3:41
8.	"Million Star Motel" (featuring Lupe Fiasco and Black Thought)	Jean; Wasalu Jaco; Tariq Trotter; Bobby Braddock	Hollander	3:06
9.	"Patty Crash"	Jean; Paul Williams; Hollander; Katz	Hollander	3:03
10.	"China"	Jean; Jimmy Webb	Hollander	4:23
11.	"Mercy of Love"	Jean; Barry Mann; Cynthia Weil	Hollander	3:27
12.	"Sex, Lies & Sunshine"	Jean; Carly Simon; Hollander; Katz	Hollander	3:59
