= LaToya London =

American musical artist (born 1978)

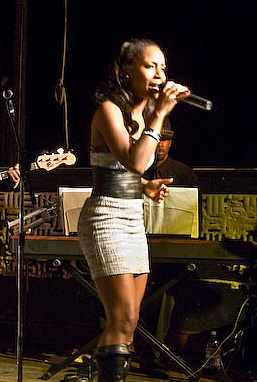

Background information
- Born: LaToya Renee London; December 29, 1978 (age 47); San Francisco, California, United States
- Genres: R&B, soul, jazz
- Occupations: Singer, actress
- Years active: 2004–present
- Label: Peak Records (2005-2006)
- Member of: Urban Punk
- Website: The Official Homepage of LaToya London

LaToya Renee London (born December 29, 1978) is an American R&B and soul singer and stage actress who was fourth-place finalist on the third season of American Idol. Her debut album, Love & Life, was released in September 2005 and spawned a number of moderate R&B chart hits. She has concentrated on stage work, including originating and performing the role of Nettie in the national tour of the Broadway musical The Color Purple from 2007 to 2010, for which she won an Ovation Award. She was the lead in the U.S. regional debut of The Bodyguard, a musical based on the 1992 film.

== Early life ==
London was born in San Francisco, California and raised in Oakland, California, where she had her first public musical performance when, at the age of 7, she sang in her mother's wedding. Her interest in singing began when she was just 4 years old, when she frequently sang when attending Allen Temple Baptist church. As a teenager, she sang with the Oakland Youth Chorus from 1993 to 1996. In 1996, she graduated from Skyline High School (the same school actor Tom Hanks and basketball player Gary Payton attended). She also worked as a waitress and a bartender and sang in a Christian rock group. She was also a backup vocalist and did frequent guest vocals for several Bay Area artists. When she began American Idol, she was the lead vocalist in a band, All-Star Jukebox, which usually performed at weddings.

== American Idol ==
London auditioned for the third season of American Idol in Los Angeles, California. Although she moved on through each round, she had not been featured prominently in any aired footage and was written off by many fans before the first studio performances. However, as a member of the third group of eight semifinalists, she sang Eric Carmen's "All by Myself," and received a standing ovation from celebrity judges Donna Summer, Randy Jackson and Paula Abdul. Jackson labeled her performance as "brilliant" and "what the search for a superstar is all about," Abdul called her "unbelievable" and praised her "quiet confidence," and Simon Cowell said she was "the best of the group" and that it was a "superb, outstanding performance." She was voted through to the final 12 contestants with 32.3 percent of audience votes, the largest percentage for every week of the semifinals.

In the following nine weeks, London had several high points on American Idol. Cowell called her performance of Chaka Khan's "Ain't Nobody" "amazing" and "awesome." Abdul said that she reminded her of "a young Gladys Knight" after she performed the Garth Brooks song "Ain't Goin' Down ('Til the Sun Comes Up)," Nickolas Ashford of famed soul duo Ashford & Simpson called her performance of "Ooo Baby Baby" by Smokey Robinson as "beautiful" and full of "sex appeal," Film director Quentin Tarantino called her a "powerhouse" after her performance of "Somewhere" from the musical West Side Story, and Cowell announced her as "the best singer in the competition" after she sang "All the Time" by Barry Manilow and gave her "a ten out of ten" for her performance of "Don't Rain on My Parade," which also garnered standing ovations from Abdul and Jackson.

London was central to one of the first controversies of the show. On April 21, 2004, the night after the final seven contestants performed Barry Manilow songs, London, Jennifer Hudson, and eventual winner Fantasia Barrino ended up in the bottom three with the least viewer votes. Together, these three had been dubbed "The Three Divas" for their critically acclaimed performances. London had the highest vote totals out of the three, and Hudson was ultimately eliminated. Because all three of the singers were African American and the frontrunners of the competition, music icon Elton John deemed the voting as "racist," igniting a flurry of news and speculation over the validity of the voting system. John complained at a promotional news conference that, "The three people I was really impressed with, and they just happened to be black, young female singers, and they all seem to be landing in the bottom three."

London's second controversy occurred on May 11, 2004, when the final four contestants each performed two disco songs. Simon Cowell, who previously endorsed her as the best singer in the competition, suggested that his only complaint with London was that after ten weeks he still did not know anything at all about her. Cowell also suggested that contestant Jasmine Trias would almost certainly be voted off the next day. However, on May 12, London became the ninth of the 12 finalists to be eliminated, finishing in fourth place, with Barrino also landing in the bottom two. London's farewell song was "Don't Rain on My Parade."

=== Performances ===
The songs London sang on the show follow:

Week #	Song Choice	Original Artist	Result
Top 32	"All by Myself"	Eric Carmen	Advanced
Top 12	"Ain't Nobody"	Chaka Khan	Safe
Top 11	"Ain't Goin' Down ('Til the Sun Comes Up)"	Garth Brooks	Safe
Top 10	"Ooo Baby Baby"	The Miracles	Bottom 3
Top 9	"Someone Saved My Life Tonight"	Elton John	Safe
Top 8	"Somewhere"	West Side Story	Safe
Top 7	"All the Time"	Barry Manilow	Bottom 3
Top 6	"Rhythm Is Gonna Get You"	Gloria Estefan	Safe
Top 5	"Too Close for Comfort" "Don't Rain on My Parade"	Natalie Cole; Barbra Streisand	Safe
Top 4	"Love You Inside Out" "Don't Leave Me This Way"	Bee Gees; Harold Melvin & the Blue Notes	Eliminated

== Post-Idol ==
Immediately after being eliminated from the series, London was featured in the Norman Lear-helmed Declare Yourself voting campaign by photographer David LaChapelle, alongside music stars like Christina Aguilera and André 3000. Her appearance on Idol host Ryan Seacrest's daily television talk show was one of its highest-rated episodes, and Oakland Mayor Jerry Brown officially declared May 4 to be LaToya London Day; one month later, she officially received the key to the city. Her rendition of Harold Melvin & the Blue Notes "If You Don't Know Me by Now" on the top-selling compilation disc, American Idol Season 3: Greatest Soul Classics, was praised as one of the album's best. She was also heavily featured on the group track, "Ain't No Mountain High Enough."

In the summer of 2004, London performed with the other top 10 finalists in the American Idols Live! Tour 2004. She had a guest co-hosting gig on the national entertainment news show, Access Hollywood, and she has performed for such events and galas as the Richmond/Ermet AIDS Foundation, 100 Black Men of America, and the Clear Channel holiday party. London has also performed the national anthem for numerous National Football League games, including the 2005 Super Bowl NFL Commissioner pre-game party. She has shared the stage with such icons and superstars as Elton John, Whoopi Goldberg, Barry Manilow, Gladys Knight, Nancy Wilson, Chaka Khan, Rachelle Ferrell, Goapele, and Burt Bacharach.

In November 2004, it was announced that London had been signed to jazz recording label Peak Records, an imprint of Concord Records. Her first single, "Appreciate," which featured a guest rap from Black Thought of the Hip-Hop group The Roots, hit the airwaves in July, and a music video of that song followed. The CD single, "Appreciate/Every Part of Me/All By Myself" reached number eight on the Billboard Singles Sales Chart. The single sold 8,500 units.

=== 2005–2006: Love & Life ===
Her debut studio album, Love & Life, was released on September 20, 2005. A mix of R&B, soul, jazz, and hip-hop, Love & Life featured songwriting by London, along with songs by well-known producers such as David Foster and Narada Michael Walden. The San Francisco Chronicle called her "impassioned and polished" with "sumptuous, wondrously elastic mezzo pipes," People magazine called it one of the best post-American Idol albums, and Apple Computer's iTunes named it one of the best albums of 2005, and her song "Non A What'cha Do" as one of the best individual recordings of the year. Love & Life sold 12,546 albums in its first week, landing at number 82 on Billboard Top 200 Albums chart and at number 27 on Billboard Top R&B/Hip-Hop Albums. To date, it has sold approximately 58,000 copies. Additionally, London has sold over 15,000 digital downloads.

London released two follow-up singles, "Every Part of Me" and "State of My Heart" in 2006, the latter of which hit number 40 on the Billboard Adult Contemporary Tracks chart and number five on the radio industry periodical Friday Morning Quarterback's Adult Contemporary spin chart.

London was also nominated for an award in the R&B category of the 2006 Bay Area Rap Scene (BARS) Awards; however, violence and disruption ended the show early before the award winners were announced. Latoya was competing against R&B star Goapele, among others.

London announced that despite having an initial three-album deal, she had parted ways from Peak Records and Concord Records.

In February 2006, she landed a lead role in Laterras R. Whitfield's touring dramatic comedy play Issues: We All Have 'Em. She sang a jazz-tinged version of "Hark! Hear the Bells" on the VH1 Soul Train Christmas television special, and sang the same song on a special edition of the 40th Anniversary A Charlie Brown Christmas album.

In late summer 2006, London made her Los Angeles professional stage debut with a starring role in the retro musical, Beehive, at the El Portal Theater in North Hollywood. London and the show earned rave reviews. That same year, the cast was nominated by the Los Angeles Drama Critics Circle for Best Ensemble Performance in their annual awards.

London was featured as a guest vocalist on Paul Taylor's new album, Ladies' Choice, released in May 2007.

London played Nettie in The Color Purple, which debuted at the Cadillac Palace Theatre for an extended run in Chicago, Illinois. London ended her run in 2010 and received a nomination for an NAACP Theatre Award in 2008 in the best supporting actress in an equity production category.

=== 2010–present: Urban Punk ===
London joined with hip-hop artist H2O in 2010 to form the group Urban Punk, producing music that combines Europop melodies with hip-hop rhythms. They released two tracks, "Around the World" and "Twisted".

In June 2013, London joined the cast of the Carolina Opry in Myrtle Beach, South Carolina.

London has starred in a number of national tours, including Redemption of a Dogg, and Tyler Perry's Madea on the Run, as well as regional productions, including Silence! The Musical and as Shug Avery in Celebration Theatre's production of The Color Purple. She was the lead in the U.S. regional debut of The Bodyguard, a musical based on the 1992 film.

== Personal life ==
London suffered a setback when she had to pull out of the VH1 Soul Tour with Jaguar Wright and Kindred due to a "family emergency." Additionally, when Ebony magazine named her one of the hottest African American bachelorettes in America in its July 2005 issue, speculation about the state of her marriage sparked off. While she was on American Idol, she proudly stated that she was married and had stepchildren. She later confirmed that she and her husband had divorced.

== Politics and endorsements ==
London posed for a political print advertising campaign by Declare Yourself, encouraging voter registration among youth for the 2008 United States presidential election. In the ads by photographer David LaChapelle, London has a nail through her upper and lower lips, pinning her mouth shut in a symbolic function. The ads drew national attention.

London also performed "Ain't Nobody" in Oakland on Election Day 2008 celebrating Barack Obama's historic victory.

== Discography ==
=== Albums ===
Year	Album details	Peak positions		Certifications (sales threshold)
Year	Album details	US	US R&B	Certifications (sales threshold)
2005	Love & Life: Released: September 20, 2005; Label: Peak Records	82	27	US sales: 58,000

=== Singles ===
- Appreciate/Every Part of Me/All By Myself (August 2005)
- Every Part of Me
- State Of My Heart Number 40 Hot AC Tracks

=== Guest contributions ===
- "If U Buyin'" (with C-Bo) (1999)
- "I Know You Want Me" (with H2O from "The Mixtape Vol. 1") (2004)
- "I Want to Show You" (with H2O from "The Mixtape Vol. 1") (2004)
- "Konfessions" (with H2O from "The Mixtape Vol. 1") (2004)
- With Okolo on "The "Real" Diamond N Tha Rough") (2005)
- "Keeps Me Movin'" (with Golden Sol), from The Golden Sol EP) (August 2005)
- "Keeps Me Movin'" (with Golden Sol from Keeps Me Movin' (Featuring Latoya London) EP) (August 2006)
- "Keeps Me Movin' (DJ Solomon's Baltimore House Mix)" (with Golden Sol from Keeps Me Movin' (Featuring Latoya London) EP) (August 2006)
- "Keeps Me Movin' (Ean's Disco Re-Rub)" (with Golden Sol from Keeps Me Movin' (Featuring Latoya London) EP) (August 2006)
- "Hold Up (Wait a Minute)" (with John Payne from The Journey) (October 2006)
- "Send My Baby Back" (with Donnie Williams and Park Place from [[Just Like Magic (Donnie Williams album}|Just Like Magic]]) (March 2007)
- "Funky Times" (with Donnie Williams and Park Place from [[Just Like Magic (Donnie Williams album}|Just Like Magic]]) (March 2007)
- "Just Like Magic" (with Donnie Williams and Park Place from [[Just Like Magic (Donnie Williams album}|Just Like Magic]]) (March 2007)
- "I Want To Be Loved (By You)" (with Paul Taylor from "Ladies' Choice (Paul Taylor album)") (March 2007)
- "ahh means ahh" (with aj from Worldwide) (March 2007)

== Awards and nominations ==
Ovation Awards

- 2012: Won the award for Featured Actress in a Musical for her role as Shug Avery in the Celebration Theatre production of "The Color Purple: The Musical"
