= Nouveau Riche (Philadelphia band) =

- Origin: United States
- Genres: Other
- Years active: 2005–2008
- Labels: None
- Past members: Nikki Jean; Dice Raw; John McGlinchey; Khari Mateen; Joe Baldacci; Dominic Angelella

Nouveau Riche was a short-lived band based in Philadelphia that featured Dice Raw. He founded the band, initially named the Disease, in 2005. Nouveau Riche opened for the Roots at the Kimmel Center. It released two extended plays (EPs), Nouveau Riche Longtail and Free Money, before disbanding in 2008. The band was also nominated for the 2007 Okayplayer Music Awards in the Rookie of the Year category, but lost to Gym Class Heroes. A full-length release called Bankrupt was planned but never released.

Chase Hoffberger of The Austin Chronicle said their music "melds hip-hop and tripped-out rock music, yet this isn't trip-hop. More like interstellar pop on a positive tip." In a review for the Chronicle, he wrote that "Nikki Jean surely owns any stage she steps on. With bass amps on rattle and hum and a frantic Dominic Angelella nearly playing his guitar out of commission, Jean danced, jived, confessed, and belted all the energy a Midwest girl could bring to a troupe from Philly."

== Discography ==
- Nouveau Riche Longtail EP
- Free Money EP
