= The Whitefield Brothers =

- Origin: Munich, Germany
- Genres: Funk
- Years active: 1991–present
- Labels: Soul Fire Records, Now-Again Records/Stones Throw Records

The Whitefield Brothers are a German funk band. The band, which consists of brothers Jan and Max Weissenfeldt, was previously known as the "'Poets of Rhythm"' beginning in 1991. Under this name, they were signed to the Quannum Projects label after they were discovered by Lyrics Born. As the Whitefield Brothers, they released their debut album In the Raw in 2001 and their second album, Earthology, in 2010. The making of Earthology took 15 years, and the album received generally favorable reviews from music critics.
