= Truth and Soul Records =

American record label

Truth & Soul
- Founded: 2004
- Founder: Leon Michels; Jeff Silverman
- Defunct: 2016
- Distributors: The Orchard (catalog); Independent (former)
- Genre: Funk; soul
- Country of origin: United States
- Location: Williamsburg, Brooklyn, New York
- Official website: truthandsoulrecords.com

Truth & Soul was a record label and production team based in Williamsburg, Brooklyn. It was formed in 2004 by Leon Michels and Jeff Silverman with Philippe Lehman. The label was best known for their releases with Lee Fields & The Expressions and other New York retro-soul / funk groups. As a production house and recording studio, Truth & Soul worked with artists like Aloe Blacc ("I Need a Dollar") and Adele ("Right as Rain"). In 2016, Truth & Soul's catalog was acquired by The Orchard, and was succeeded by Big Crown Records and Mighty Eye Records.

== History ==
=== Soul Fire Records ===
Truth & Soul was born out of Soul Fire Records, a label run by musician Phillip Lehman. Lehman had previously run soul revival pioneer Desco Records with Bosco Mann, and founded Soul Fire in 1999 as a funk label; Mann would later open the soulful Daptone Records. Between 1999 and 2003, Soul Fire put out numerous records by artists including Lee Fields and The Whitefield Brothers. In 2003, Lehman retired from the music business, leaving his studio to young musicians Jeff "Dynamite" Silverman and Leon Michels, both former Soul Fire artists.

=== Formation and releases of Truth & Soul ===
Silverman and Michels founded Truth & Soul with help from Lehman in 2004. Silverman and Michels ran the label with label manager Danny Akalepse, and were the in-house production team. The label has recorded and released the music of El Michels Affair, Bronx River Parkway, Quincy Bright, The Evil D's, Lee Fields and The Expressions, The Fabulous Three, Cosmic Force, The Olympians, Tyrone Ashley's Funky Music Machine, Ghetto Brothers, The Phenomenal Handclap Band, and Bama & The Family.

In 2008, Truth & Soul produced and released the Lee Fields & The Expressions album My World to critical acclaim. The same year they produced Aloe Blacc's sophomore record, Good Things, which was released on Stones Throw records on September 28, 2010. A new studio, The Diamond Mine, was built in Long Island City 2014 by Michels and his frequent collaborators Thomas Brenneck, Nick Movshon, and Homer Steinweiss.

Truth & Soul has remixed "Love Is a Losing Game" by Amy Winehouse, the Gabriella Cilmi single "Sweet About Me", Dinah Washington's "Cry Me A River" for Verve Remixed 4, and Truth & Soul are credited as writers on Adele's grammy nominated album, 19. Their records have been sampled by Ghostface Killah, Just Blaze, Jay-Z, Young Jeezy. Other venture included curating the in-game radio station of the same name in the 2009 video game GTA: Chinatown Wars.

=== Legacy: Big Crown Records and Mighty Eye Records ===
Big Crown Records
- Founded: 2016
- Founder: Leon Michels; Danny Akalepse
- Distributor: Secretly Distribution
- Genre: Soul; retro-soul; folk; world music
- Location: Brooklyn, New York
- Official website: bigcrownrecords.com

Mighty Eye Records
- Founded: 2022
- Distributor: Fat Beats
- Genre: Funk; soul; disco
- Location: Brooklyn, New York
- Official website: mightyeyerecords.com

Michels and Silverman dissolved Truth & Soul in July 2016 with The Orchard acquiring the label and the distribution rights to its catalog. Soon after, Michels co-founded Big Crown Records with Truth & Soul manager Danny Akalepse. Some artists on the Truth & Soul roster moved to Big Crown at this time. In 2022, Mighty Eye Records began in collaboration with Silverman.

== Artists ==
Noted 'featured artists' included:

- Bronx River Parkway †
- Cosmic Force
- El Michels Affair †‡
- Fabulous Three (Leon Michel & Jeff Silverman) †
- Jr Thomas & The Volcanos
- Lady Wray †‡
- Lee Fields & The Expressions †‡
- Liam Bailey ‡
- Michael Leonhart and Avramina 7
- Shirley Nanette
- Tyrone Ashley & Funky Music Machine (reissue)
- Ghetto Brothers (reissue)
- Bobby Oroza ‡

† denotes artist on Soul Fire Records
‡ denotes artists on Big Crown Records

== Discography ==
Artist	Title	Catalog Number	Release date
El Michels Affair	Sounding Out The City	TSCD-001	2004
Various Artists	Fallin Off The Reel	TSCD-002	2005
Tyrone Ashley & Funky Music Machine	Let Me Be Your Man	TSCD-003	2007 Reissue
Various Artists	Fallin Off The Reel vol.2	TSCD-004	2008
Bronx River Parkway	San Sebastian 152	TSCD-006	2008
Lee Fields & The Expressions	My World	TSCD-007	2009
El Michels Affair	Enter The 37th Chamber	to be released in conjunction with fat beats records	2009
Michael Leonhart & Avramina 7	Seahorse & The Storyteller	TSCD-009	2010
Bama & The Family	Feeling Good b/w Drums of Asiko	TS001	2004
Bronx River Parkway feat. Analu	Deixa Pra La b/w Mas y Mas	TS002	2004
Timothy McNealy	K.C Stomp b/w Easy, Easy, Easy	TS003	2004
Lee Fields & The Expressions	Do You Love Me b/w Honey Dove	TS004	2004
El Michels Affair	Creation b/w Behind The Blue Curtains	TS005	2005
The Expressions	Money Is King b/w These Moments	TS006	2005
Quincy Bright	My Ghetto Looks Like This	TS007	2006
El Michels Affair	C.R.E.A.M b/w Glaciers of Ice	TS008	2006
Funky Music Machine	Gotta clean Up The World	TS009	2006 Reissue
Bronx River Parkway	La Valla b/w Nora Se Va	TS010	2007
Tyrone Ashley & Funky Music Machine	Can't Help Myself b/w Love Me A Little While Longer	TS011	2007 Reissue
El Michels Affair	Bring Da Ruckus b/w Duel Of The Iron Mic	TS012	2007
Black Velvet	Is It Me You Really Love b/w Earthquake's Coming	TS014	2007 Reissue
El Michels Affair w/ Raekwon	The PJ's...from afar	TS015	2007
Lee Fields & The Expressions	My World b/w Love Comes and Goes	TS016	2007
Bronx River Parkway	Agua con Sel b/w Me Toca	TS017	2008
Timothy McNealy	What's Going On b/w I'm So glad You're Mine	TS018	2008 Reissue
Quincy Bright	My Ghetto Looks Like This Vol. 2	TS020	2009
The Olympians	How Can I Love b/w Stand Tall	TS025	2009
Lady	Lady		2013

== See also ==
- List of record labels
