= Dice Raw =

American rapper

- Born: Karl Jenkins; 1 January 1980 (age 46)
- Origin: Philadelphia, Pennsylvania, U.S.
- Genres: Hip hop
- Occupation: Rapper
- Years active: 1990s–present
- Label: Def Jam
- Formerly of: Nouveau Riche; The Roots
- Website: diceraw.net

Karl Jenkins (born January 1, 1980), known professionally as Dice Raw, is an American rapper from Philadelphia. He best known for his associations with The Roots and the now defunct musical group Nouveau Riche.

== Career ==
He hooked up with the band while still in high school after Kelo, a member of the group's production team, spotted him in a local talent show. The group quickly took the young rapper under their collective wings and decided to bring his talent along slowly. He made his debut in "The Lesson, Pt. 1." Soon after, he made a name for himself with cameos on "Episodes" and "Adrenaline", where his hard-hitting style complemented the heady rhymes of Roots leader Black Thought. Dice Raw has made several guest appearances on several mixtapes. He made an appearance in fellow band member and beatboxer Scratch's first solo album Embodiment of Instrumentation.

In 2000, Dice Raw released his solo debut album, Reclaiming the Dead on MCA Records.

Jenkins recorded vocals for the entrance theme of WWE wrestler Kung Fu Naki. titled "Kung Fu San", which samples Carl Douglas's "Kung Fu Fighting", and is available on Voices: WWE The Music, Vol. 9.

Additionally Jenkins has been in the studio functioning as co writer and producer for The Roots, in addition to working on his own material. In May 2010, Dice released his first solo single in ten years entitled "100" off of his upcoming solo project The Greatest Rapper Never. The single is a digital release and was made available on iTunes.

Jenkins has turned his interest to the performing arts world and has written and produced a multitude of musicals including The Last Jimmy, the story of mass incarceration inspired by of escaped slave Henry Box Brown.

Karl "Dice Raw" Jenkins is now board-chair of The New Freedom Theaters of Philadelphia, as well as being the producing director of the Devon Theater of Mayfair. He runs indie label Raw Life Records, from where he released his solo project "The Greatest Rapper Never". He also signed prominent battle rapper Rone, who released an album under Raw Life Records titled "The First Story". The song "Against The Wall" features Dice Raw.

== Discography ==
=== Albums ===
- 2000: Reclaiming The Dead
- 2013: Jimmy's Back
- 2018: The Narrative
- 2026: The Insanity Project

=== Appearances on The Roots albums ===
- "The Lesson, Pt. 1" on Do You Want More?!!!??!
- "Clones" and "Episodes" Illadelph Halflife
- "Adrenaline!", "Diedre vs. Dice", "Ain't Sayin' Nothin' New" and "Don't See Us" on Things Fall Apart
- "Rhymes & Ammo" on Phrenology
- "BOOM!" on The Tipping Point
- "The Lesson, Pt. 3" on Home Grown! The Beginner's Guide To Understanding The Roots, Vol. 2
- "Here I Come" on Game Theory
- "Get Busy", "I Can't Help It", "I Will Not Apologize" and "The Grand Return" on Rising Down
- "How I Got Over", "Walk Alone", "Radio Daze" and "Now or Never" on How I Got Over
- "Make My", "One Time", "Lighthouse", and "Tip The Scale" on Undun
- "Black Rock," "Understand", and "The Dark (Trinity)" on And Then You Shoot Your Cousin

=== Unreleased songs ===
- "Workinonit", "Take It There (Remix)" and "The Good, The Bad & The Desolate"

=== Features ===
- "Just Leave (Remix)", "Richard Osborne feat Dice Raw."
